= Leica X =

Leica X (Typ 113)
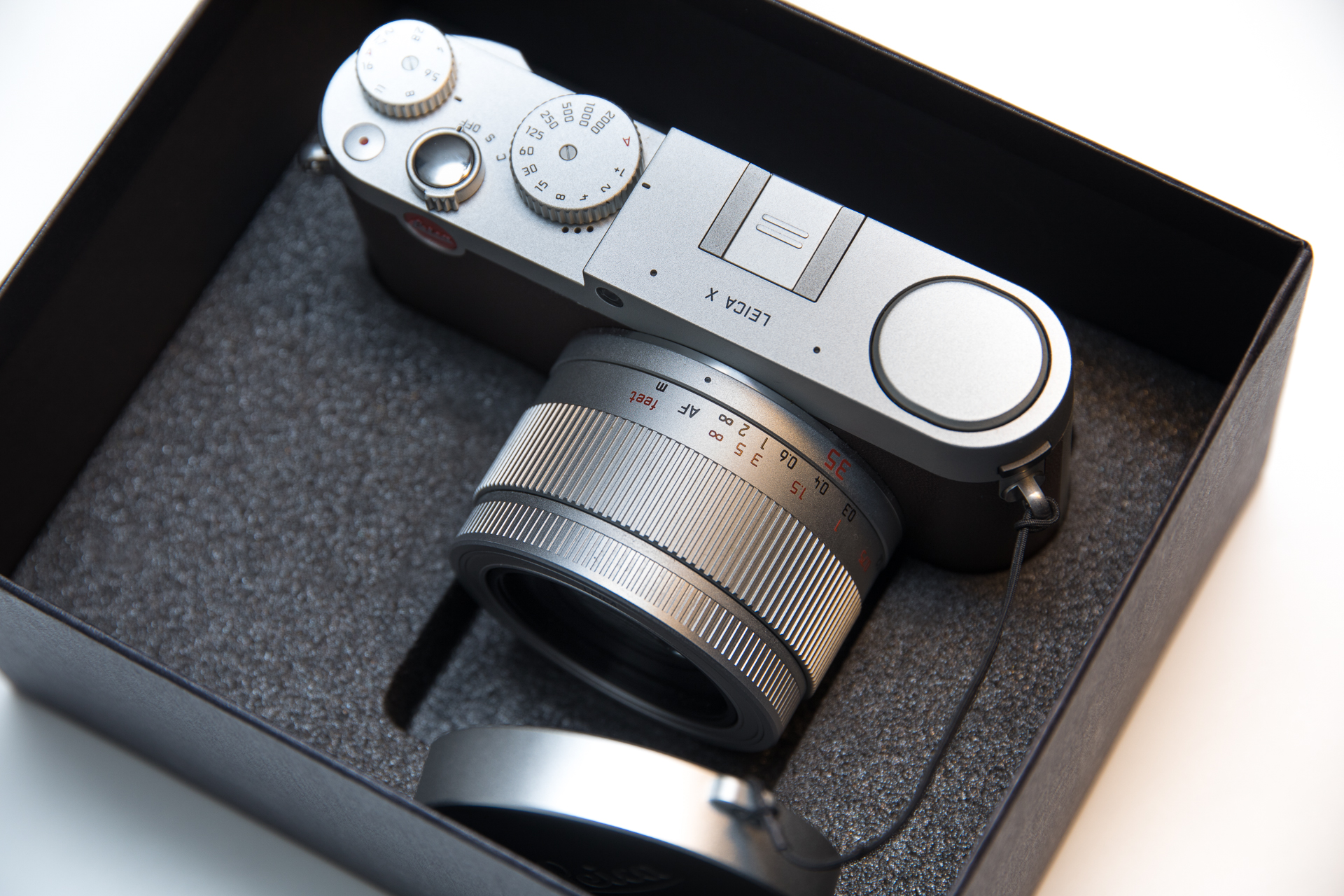
- Leica X (Typ 113), silver version

Overview
- Maker: Leica
- Type: Large sensor fixed-lens camera

Lens
- Lens: 35mm equivalent
- F-numbers: f/1.7 to f/16

Sensor/medium
- Sensor type: CMOS
- Sensor size: 23 x 15.5mm (APS-C type)
- Maximum resolution: 4928 x 3264 (16 megapixels)
- Film speed: 100-12,500
- Recording medium: SD, SDHC, or SDXC memory cards

Focusing
- Focus areas: 11 focus points

Shutter
- Shutter speeds: 1/2000s to 30s
- Continuous shooting: 5 frames per second

Image processing
- White balance: Yes

General
- LCD screen: 3 inches with 920,000 dots
- Body features: Magnesium and aluminium with leather trim
- Dimensions: 133 x 73 x 78mm (5.24 x 2.87 x 3.07 inches)
- Weight: 486 g (17 oz) including battery

The Leica X (Typ 113) is a large sensor digital compact camera announced by Leica Camera on September 16, 2014. It improves on its predecessor, the Leica X2, with a higher resolution rear display and brighter 23mm f/1.7 lens that allows a shallower depth of field.

== See also ==
- List of large sensor fixed-lens cameras
- List of retro-style digital cameras
