= Panasonic Lumix DMC-LX10 =

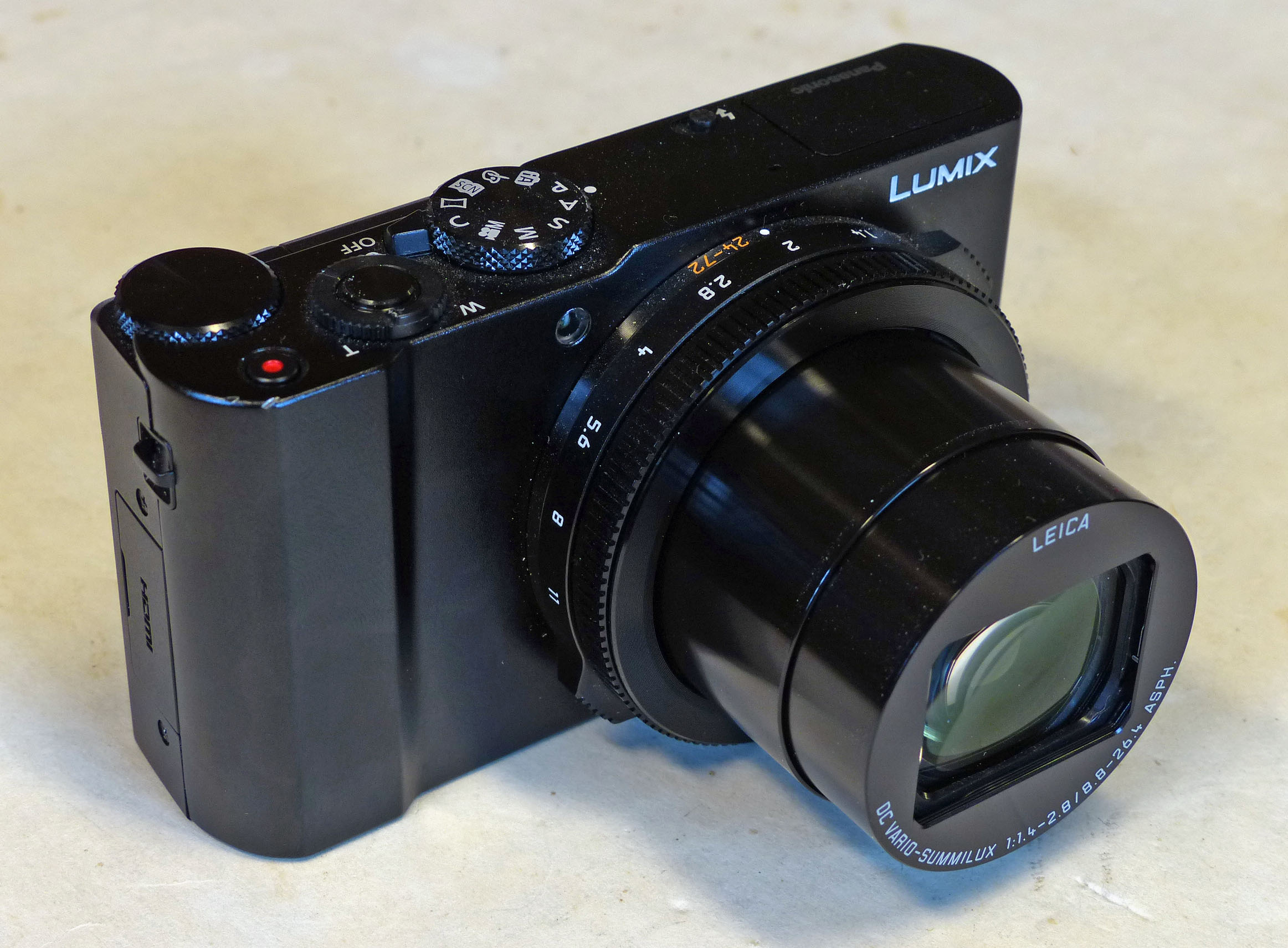

Overview
- Maker: Panasonic
- Type: Large sensor fixed-lens camera
- Released: September 19, 2016
- Intro price: 699$

Lens
- Lens: 24-72mm equivalent
- F-numbers: f/1.4-f/2.8 at the widest

Sensor/medium
- Sensor type: BSI-CMOS
- Sensor size: 13.2 x 8.8mm
- Maximum resolution: 5472 x 3648 (20 megapixels)
- Film speed: 200-25600 (and 80-100 in expanded ISO)
- Recording medium: SD, SDHC, or SDXC (UHS-I supported, UHS Speed Class 3 required for 4k)

Focusing
- Focus areas: 49 focus points

Shutter
- Frame rate: 24p, 25p (PAL); 24p, 25p, 30p (NTSC), 60p
- Shutter speeds: 1/4000s to 60s
- Continuous shooting: 2-10 frames per second, 50 frames per second with electronic shutter only

Image processing
- Image processor: Venus Engine
- White balance: Yes

General
- LCD screen: 3 inches with 1040k dots
- Battery: 7.2V, 680 mAh, 4.9 Wh
- Dimensions: 105.5 x 60 x 42mm (4.15 x 2.36 x 1.65 inches)
- Weight: 310 g (11 oz) including battery and SD Card

The Panasonic Lumix DMC-LX10 (also DMC-LX15 in some markets and DMC-LX9 in Japan) is a 20 MP 1" sensor compact camera in the Lumix range, announced by Panasonic on September 19, 2016. LX10 features an F1.4–2.8 equivalent Leica-branded zoom lens, 3" 1040k dot LCD, built-in flash, built-in wireless, and it can record 4K (Ultra HD) video at 30p or Full HD at 60p. The LX10 is more compact than the Panasonic LX100 or GX8 series by not having an electronic viewfinder, interchangeable lenses, or hot shoe. The camera is typically compared to the Sony RX100 series.

== Video capture quality ==
The DMC-LX10 (PAL version) provides the following video capture quality

- H.264 - 3840 x 2160 p - 30p - 100 Mbps
- H.264 - 3840 x 2160 p - 25p - 100 Mbps
- H.264 - 3840 x 2160 p - 24p - 100 Mbps
- H.264 - 1920 x 1080 p - 60p - 28 Mbps
- H.264 - 1920 x 1080 p - 50p - 28 Mbps
- H.264 - 1920 x 1080 p - 30p - 20 Mbps
- H.264 - 1920 x 1080 p - 25p - 20 Mbps
- H.264 - 1280 x 720 p - 30p - 28 Mbps
- H.264 - 1280 x 720 p - 25p - 28 Mbps
- AVCHD - 1920 x 1080 p - 50p - 28 Mbps
- AVCHD - 1920 x 1080 i - 50i (sensor output 25p) - 17 Mbps
- AVCHD - 1920 x 1080 p - 24p - 24 Mbps

(These video capture qualities are different from the LX15 NTSC version.)

The LX10 (PAL version) has Slow Motion video capability in FHD (1080p) captured at 100 fps MP4 providing a 25 fps output.

== See also ==
- List of large sensor fixed-lens cameras
