= Leica X Vario =

Overview
- Maker: Leica
- Type: Large sensor fixed-lens camera

Lens
- Lens: 28-70mm equivalent
- F-numbers: f/3.5-f/6.4 at the widest

Sensor/medium
- Sensor type: CMOS
- Sensor size: 23.6 x 15.8mm (APS-C type)
- Maximum resolution: 4928 x 3272 (16 megapixels)
- Film speed: 100-12500
- Recording medium: SD, SDHC, SDXC

Focusing
- Focus areas: 11 focus points

Shutter
- Shutter speeds: 1/2000s to 30s
- Continuous shooting: 5 frames per second

Viewfinder
- Optional viewfinders: Electronic viewfinder Leica EVF 2 Viso-Flex (1.4 megapixels) with "90° swivel function" available as an accessory

Image processing
- White balance: Yes

General
- LCD screen: 3 inches with 920,000 dots
- Body features: Metal (incl. aluminium top-plate) and leather
- Dimensions: 133 x 73 x 95mm (5.24 x 2.87 x 3.74 inches)
- Weight: 680 g (24 oz) including battery

The Leica X Vario is a digital large sensor compact camera announced by Leica Camera on June 11, 2013.

Its specifications are largely identical to the earlier Leica X2, with the exception of the 18-46 mm zoom lens (28-70 mm equivalent angle of view in 35 mm full frame format), whereas the X2 has a fixed focal length (prime) lens.

== See also ==
- List of large sensor fixed-lens cameras
- List of retro-style digital cameras
