= RX1 =

RX1 may refer to:

- Sony Cyber-shot DSC-RX1 digital compact camera
- RX1, FIA rallycross racing category
