= Panasonic Lumix DMC-FZ2500 =

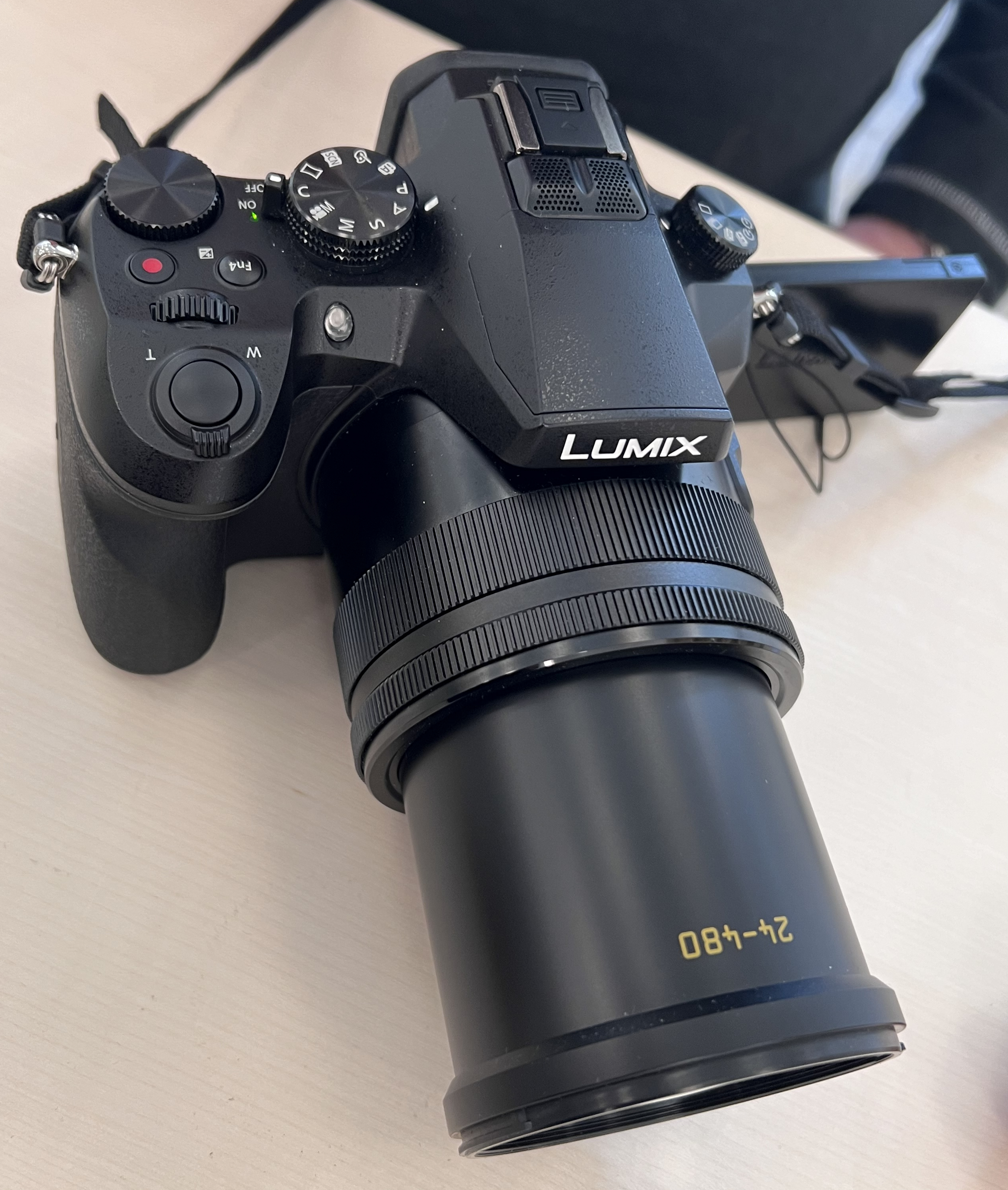
- The Lumix DMC-FZ2500/FZ2000

Overview
- Maker: Panasonic Lumix
- Type: Digital bridge camera

Lens
- Lens mount: fixed lens
- Lens: Leica DC Vario Elmarit f/2.8 - 4.5 8.8-176 mm Asph. (24 - 480 mm equivalent)
- F-numbers: f/2.8-4.5 at the widest - 11 (f/7.6-12.2 equivalent)

Sensor/medium
- Sensor type: CMOS 20.1 MP
- Sensor size: 13.2 × 8.8 mm (1 inch type, 2.7X crop factor)
- Maximum resolution: 5472 × 3648 (20.1 megapixels, 3:2 RAW)
- Film speed: 125-12800 (80-25600 expanded)
- Recording medium: SD/SDXC/SDHC, single slot
- Storage media: SD, SDHC, SDXC

Focusing
- Focus modes: Normal/AF macro/MF/Quick AF On/off, Continuous AF
- Focus areas: Normal: wide 30 cm - infinity/tele 100 cm - infinity, Macro: 3 cm - infinity

Flash
- Flash: Built-in

Shutter
- Frame rate: Up to 50 fps at 20 MP
- Shutter speeds: minimum: 1/16 000 s (electronic), 1/4000 s (mechanical) maximum: 60 s

Viewfinder
- Viewfinder: Electronic, OLED, 2.36M dots

General
- LCD screen: 3.0" free-angle TFT screen LCD
- Battery: Li-ion battery pack (7.2V, minimum: 1200mAh)
- Dimensions: 137.6×101.9×134.7 mm (5.42×4.01×5.30 in)
- Weight: 966 g (34 oz) with battery and SD memory card

The Panasonic Lumix DMC-FZ2500 (also known as the Panasonic Lumix DMC-FZ2000) is a 1" sensor DSLR-styled digital bridge camera released by Panasonic on November 28, 2016. It succeeded the Panasonic Lumix DMC-FZ1000, however the FZ1000 II was released in March, 2019 also. Its main competing model is the Sony RX10 III.

The FZ2500 offers several improvements over its predecessor, including a touch screen, headphone jack, Cinema 4K (24 fps only), a longer zoom, internal ND filters, unlimited 4K Recording, 4K image stabilization, a side loaded SD Card slot, and a Pull Focus function. Regarding its lens, compared to that of the FZ1000 it has 9 blades instead of 7, as well as an additional element. However, its first release was $400 more expensive than that of the FZ1000.

In their review of the FZ2500, DPReview wrote, "The Panasonic DMC-FZ2500/FZ2000 is a well-designed, full-featured enthusiast bridge camera that's hard to ignore. While it's clearly targeted toward video shooting, at which it's excellent, it is also a very good (but not best-in-class) stills camera.", and gave it its Silver Award.

== See also ==
- List of large sensor fixed-lens cameras
- List of bridge cameras
