= Leica X-U =

Compact underwater camera

Leica X-U (Typ 113)
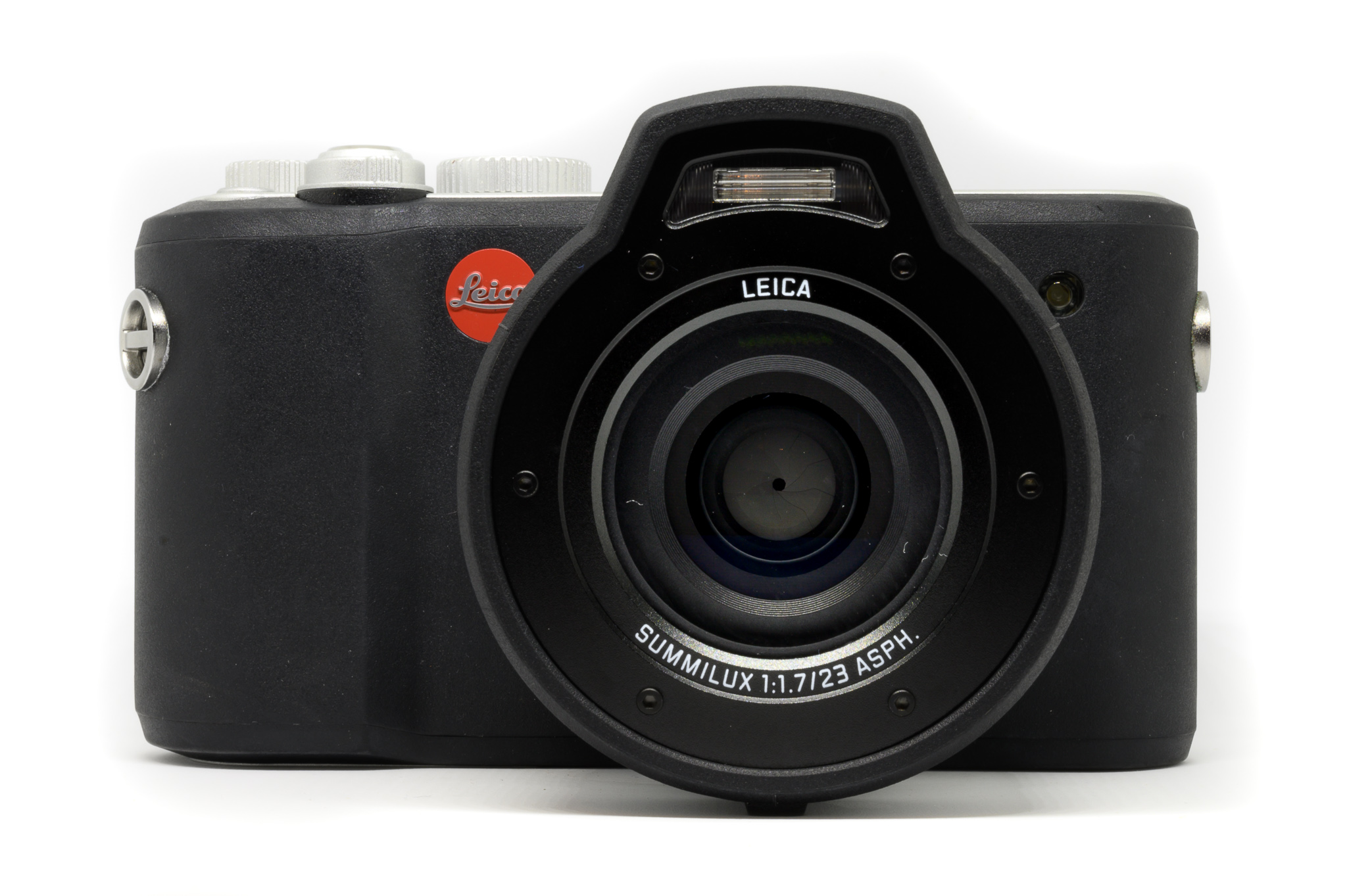

Overview
- Maker: Leica Camera
- Type: Large sensor fixed-lens camera
- Released: 20 January 2016
- Intro price: US$2,950

Lens
- Lens mount: fixed lens
- Lens: 23mm (equivalent to 35mm on full-frame)
- F-numbers: f/1.7–f/16

Sensor/medium
- Sensor type: CMOS
- Sensor size: 23.6 mm × 15.7 mm (0.93 in × 0.62 in) APS-C
- Maximum resolution: 4928×3264 (16 megapixels)
- Film speed: 100-12500
- Recording medium: SD/SDHC/SDXC memory card

Focusing
- Focus: Autofocus

Flash
- Flash: Built-in flash, 2.00m range at ISO 100

Shutter
- Shutter speeds: 1/2000s to 30s
- Continuous shooting: 5.0 frames per second

Image processing
- White balance: Yes

General
- Video recording: 1920×1080p30, 1280×720p30
- LCD screen: 3 inches with 920,000 dots
- Battery: BP-DC8
- Dimensions: 140 mm × 88 mm × 79 mm (5.5 in × 3.5 in × 3.1 in)
- Weight: 635 g (22.4 oz)
- Made in: Germany

The Leica X-U (Typ 113) is a compact underwater camera by Leica Camera, released on 20 January 2016. The Leica X-U combines the APS-C format CMOS sensor of 16.2 megapixels with the Leica Summilux 23 mm (equals 35 mm field of view in 35 mm-format) f/1.7 ASPH lens. The camera records video in 1920 x 1080 or 1280 x 720 pixel resolution at 30 frames per second in MP4 video format. Made in Germany in collaboration with Audi Design, the Leica X-U has an aluminium top plate and an anti-slip TPE protective armor. The camera is fully waterproof at depths of up to 15 m or 49 feet.

== Gallery ==
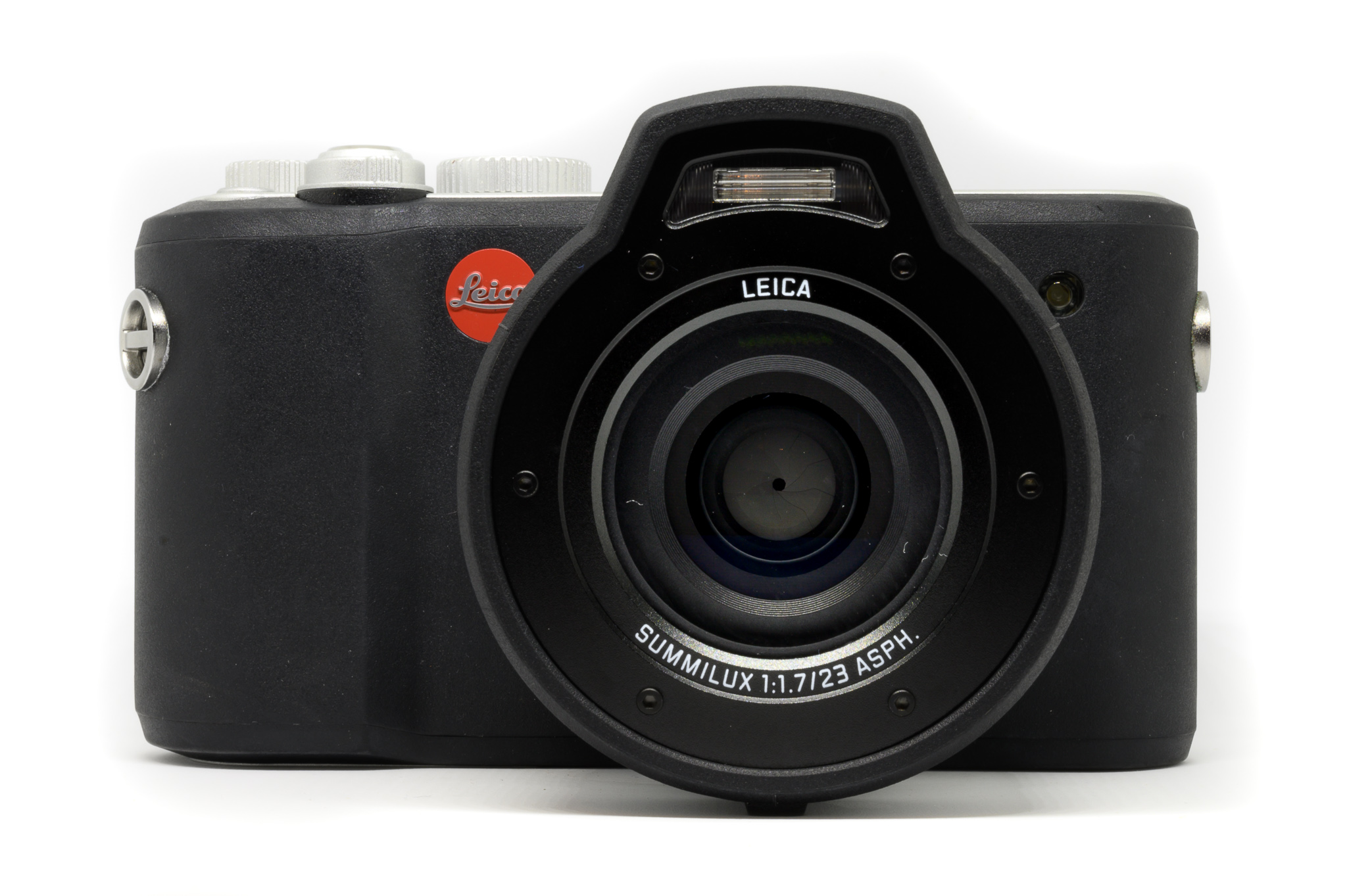
Leica X-U front

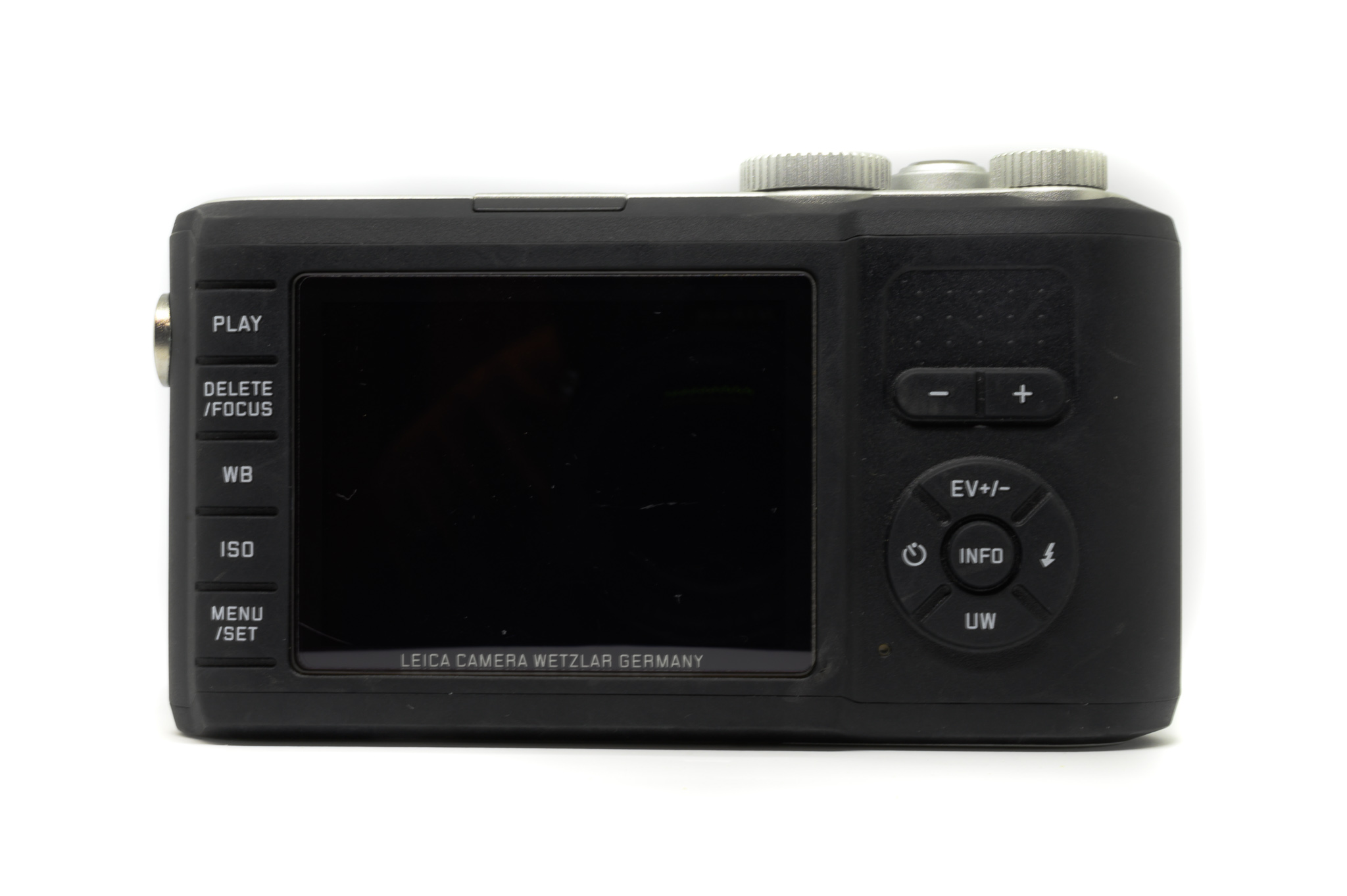
Leica X-U back

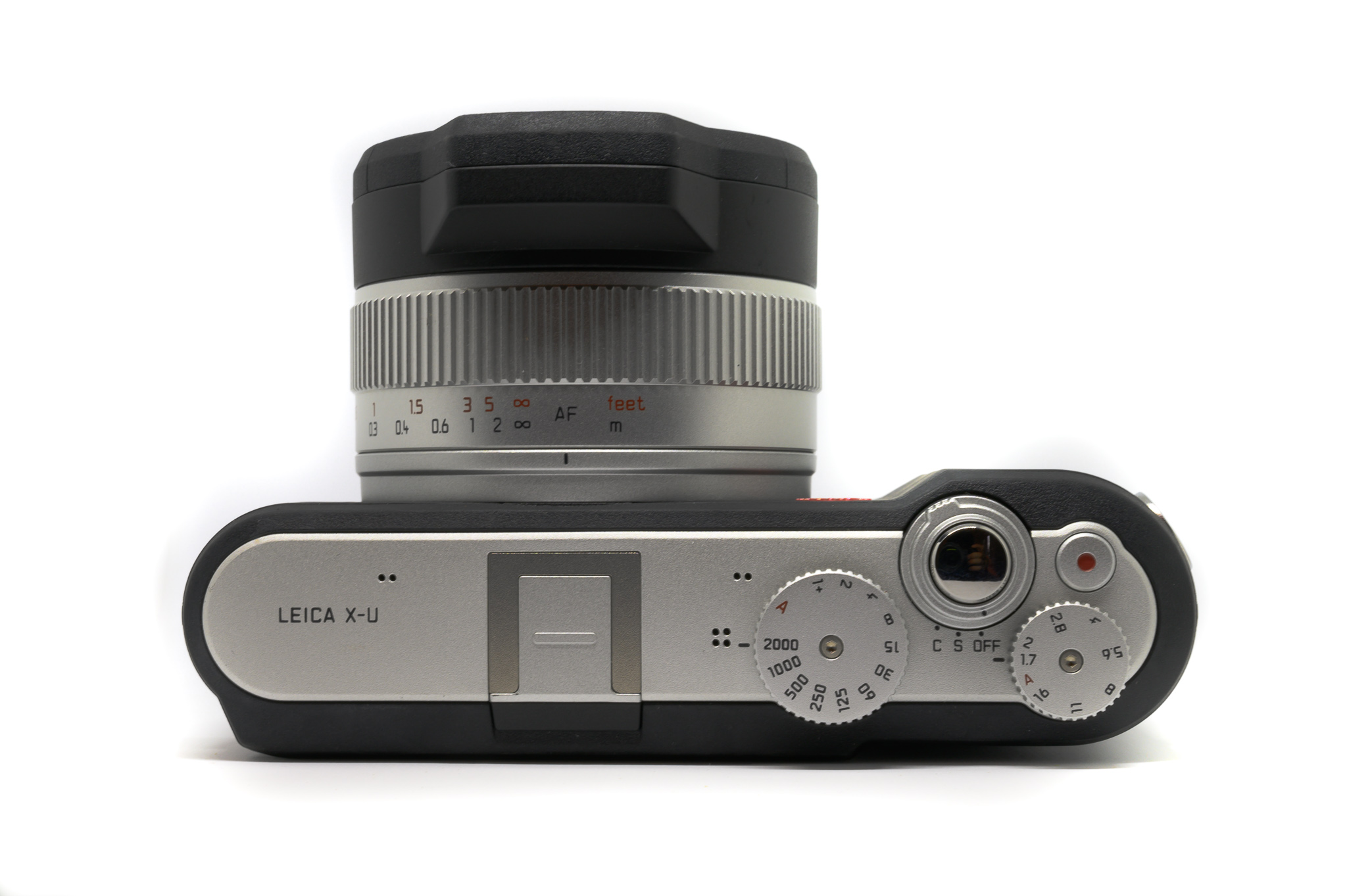
Leica X-U top plate

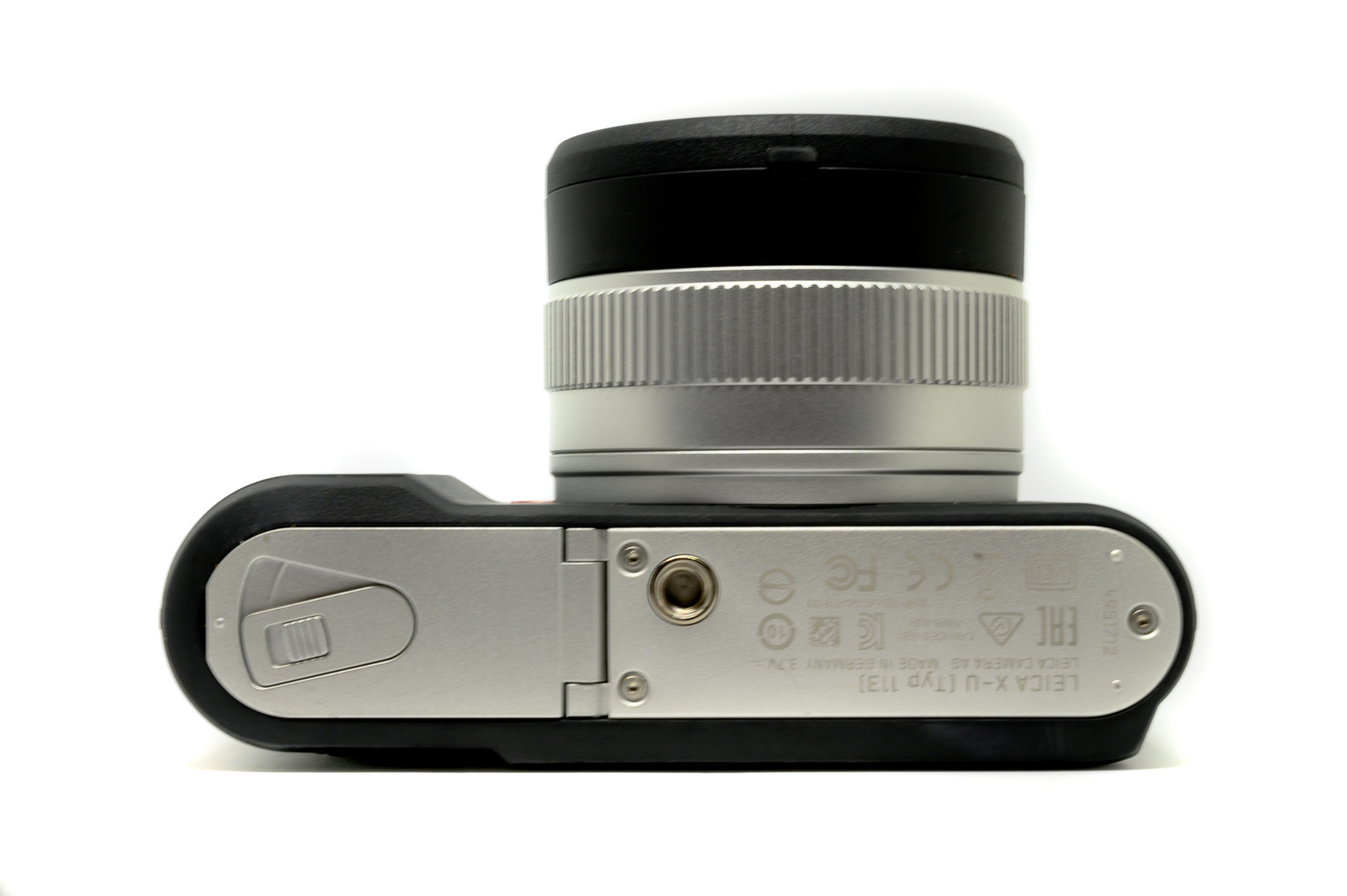
Leica X-U bottom plate

== See also ==
- List of large sensor fixed-lens cameras
