= Sigma dp2 Quattro =

Sigma DP2 Quattro
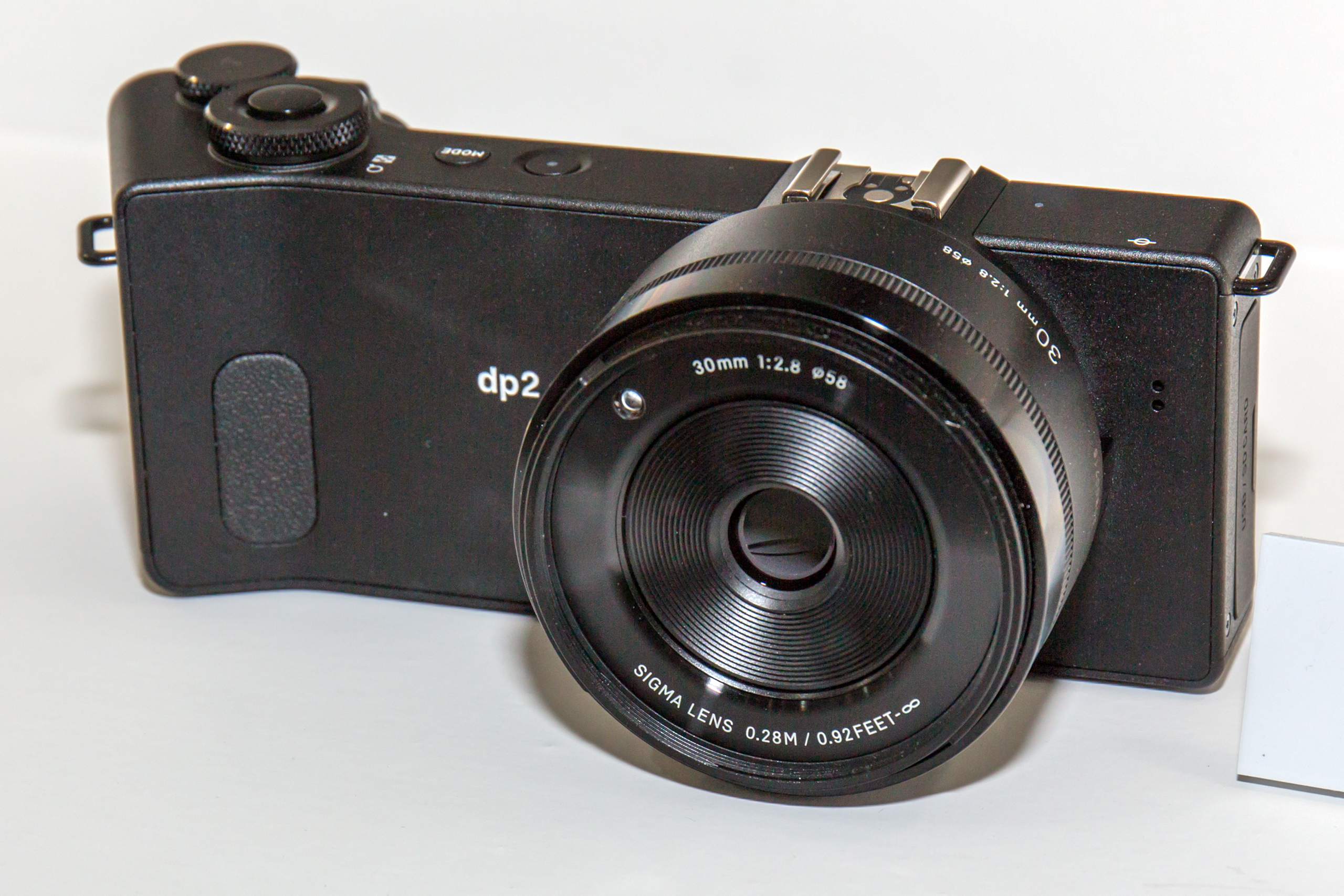

Overview
- Maker: Sigma
- Type: Large sensor fixed-lens camera

Lens
- Lens: 45mm equivalent
- F-numbers: f/2.8 at the widest

Sensor/medium
- Sensor size: 23.5 x 15.7mm (APS-C type)
- Maximum resolution: 5424 x 3616 (19.6 megapixels - 39.226.368 photosites)
- Film speed: 100-6400

Focusing
- Focus areas: 9 focus points

Shutter
- Shutter speeds: 1/2000s to 30s

Image processing
- Image processor: TRUE III engine
- White balance: Yes

General
- LCD screen: 3 inches with 920,000 dots
- Dimensions: 161 x 67 x 82mm (6.34 x 2.64 x 3.23 inches)
- Weight: 395 g (14 oz) including battery

The Sigma DP2 Quattro is a large sensor digital compact camera announced by Sigma Corporation on February 13, 2014. It is the first Sigma camera to feature a new "Quattro" branded sensor.

== See also ==
- List of large sensor fixed-lens cameras

Type	Lens	2002	2003	2004	2005	2006	2007	2008	2009	2010	2011	2012	2013	2014	2015	2016	2017	2018	2019	2020	2021	2022	2023	2024	2025	2026
MILC	Full frame																									
MILC	Full frame																									BF
MILC	Full frame																					fp L				
MILC	Full frame																		fp							FP2
MILC	APS-H															SD Quattro H										
MILC	APS-C															SD Quattro										
Compact (Prime lens)	Wide														dp0 Quattro											
Compact (Prime lens)	Wide							DP1		DP1s	DP1x		DP1 Merrill		dp1 Quattro											
Compact (Prime lens)	Normal								DP2	DP2s	DP2x		DP2 Merrill	dp2 Quattro												
Compact (Prime lens)	Tele												DP3 Merrill	dp3 Quattro												
DSLR	APS-C	SD9		SD10				SD14		SD15		SD1	SD1 Merrill													
