= Sigma DP2x =

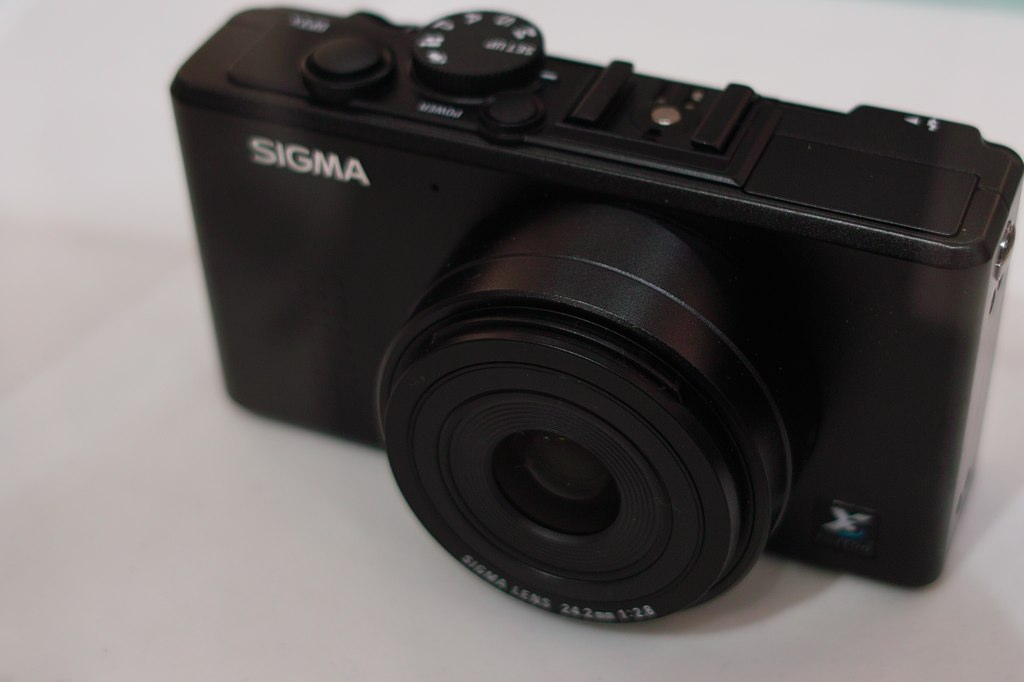

Overview
- Maker: Sigma
- Type: Large sensor fixed-lens camera

Lens
- Lens: 41mm equivalent

Sensor/medium
- Sensor type: Foveon X3 (CMOS)
- Sensor size: 20.7 × 13.8mm (APS-C type)
- Maximum resolution: 2652 × 1768 × 3 (14.1 million effective pixels, 4.69 megapixel output image size)
- Film speed: 100-3200
- Recording medium: SD/SDHC/MMC

Shutter
- Shutter speeds: 1/2000s to 15s
- Continuous shooting: 3 frames per second

Image processing
- Image processor: True II
- White balance: Yes

General
- LCD screen: 2.5 inches with 230,000 dots
- Dimensions: 113 x 60 x 56mm (4.45 x 2.36 x 2.2 inches)
- Weight: 280 g (10 oz) including battery

The Sigma DP2x is a large-sensor digital compact camera announced by Sigma Corporation on February 8, 2011. It features a Foveon X3 sensor.

== See also ==
- List of large sensor fixed-lens cameras

Type	Lens	2002	2003	2004	2005	2006	2007	2008	2009	2010	2011	2012	2013	2014	2015	2016	2017	2018	2019	2020	2021	2022	2023	2024	2025
MILC	Full frame																								
MILC	Full frame																	BF							
MILC	Full frame																	fp L							
MILC	Full frame																	fp							
MILC	APS-H															SD Quattro H									
MILC	APS-C															SD Quattro									
Compact (Prime lens)	Wide														dp0 Quattro										
Compact (Prime lens)	Wide							DP1		DP1s	DP1x		DP1 Merrill		dp1 Quattro										
Compact (Prime lens)	Normal								DP2	DP2s	DP2x		DP2 Merrill	dp2 Quattro											
Compact (Prime lens)	Tele												DP3 Merrill	dp3 Quattro											
DSLR	APS-C	SD9		SD10				SD14		SD15		SD1	SD1 Merrill												
