= Sony RX =

Digital camera range

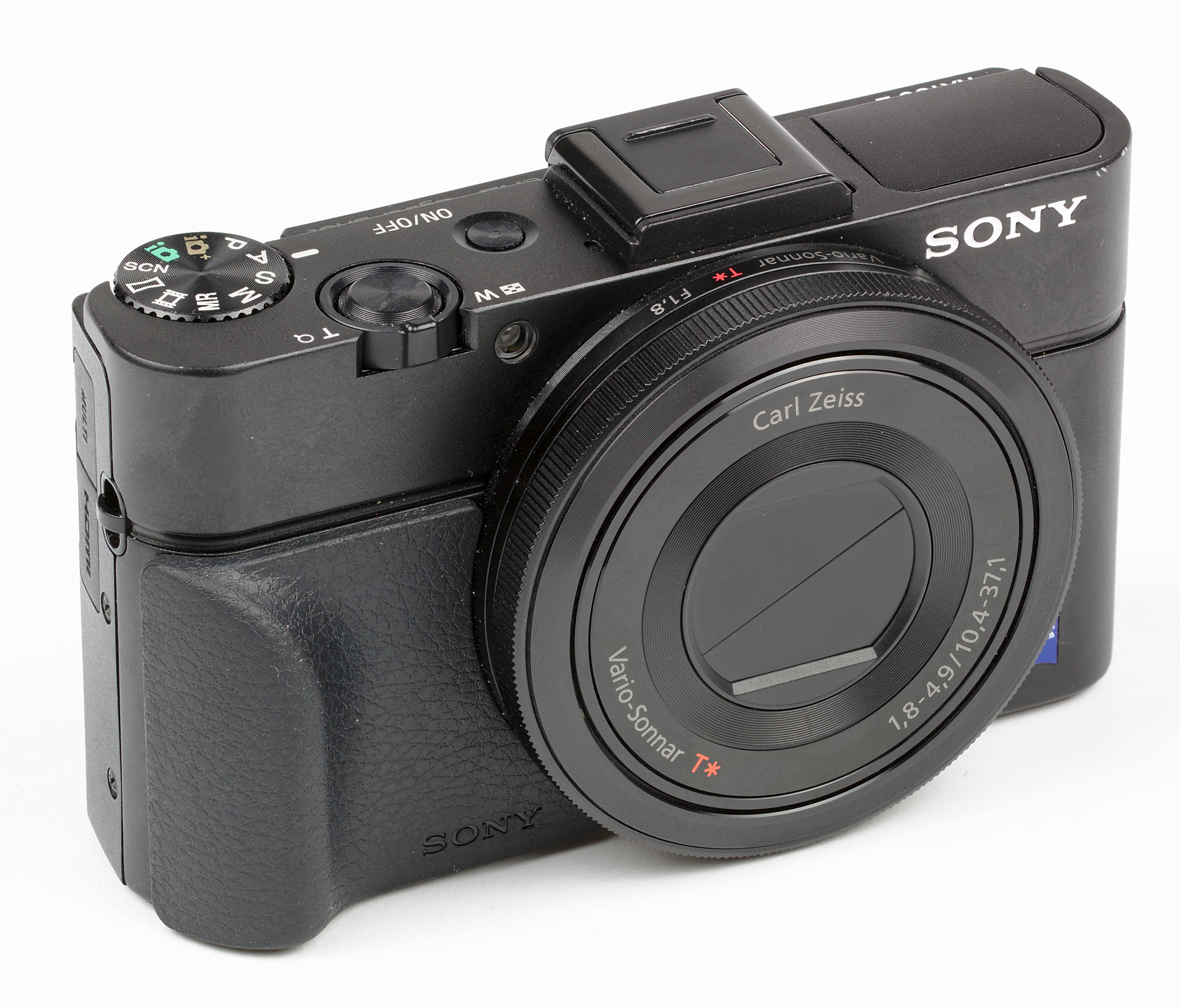
Sony Cybershot DSC-RX100 II Front

Sony RX is a range of fixed lens compact point-and-shoot digital cameras created by Sony. All cameras are equipped with Carl Zeiss lenses.

== 0 Series ==
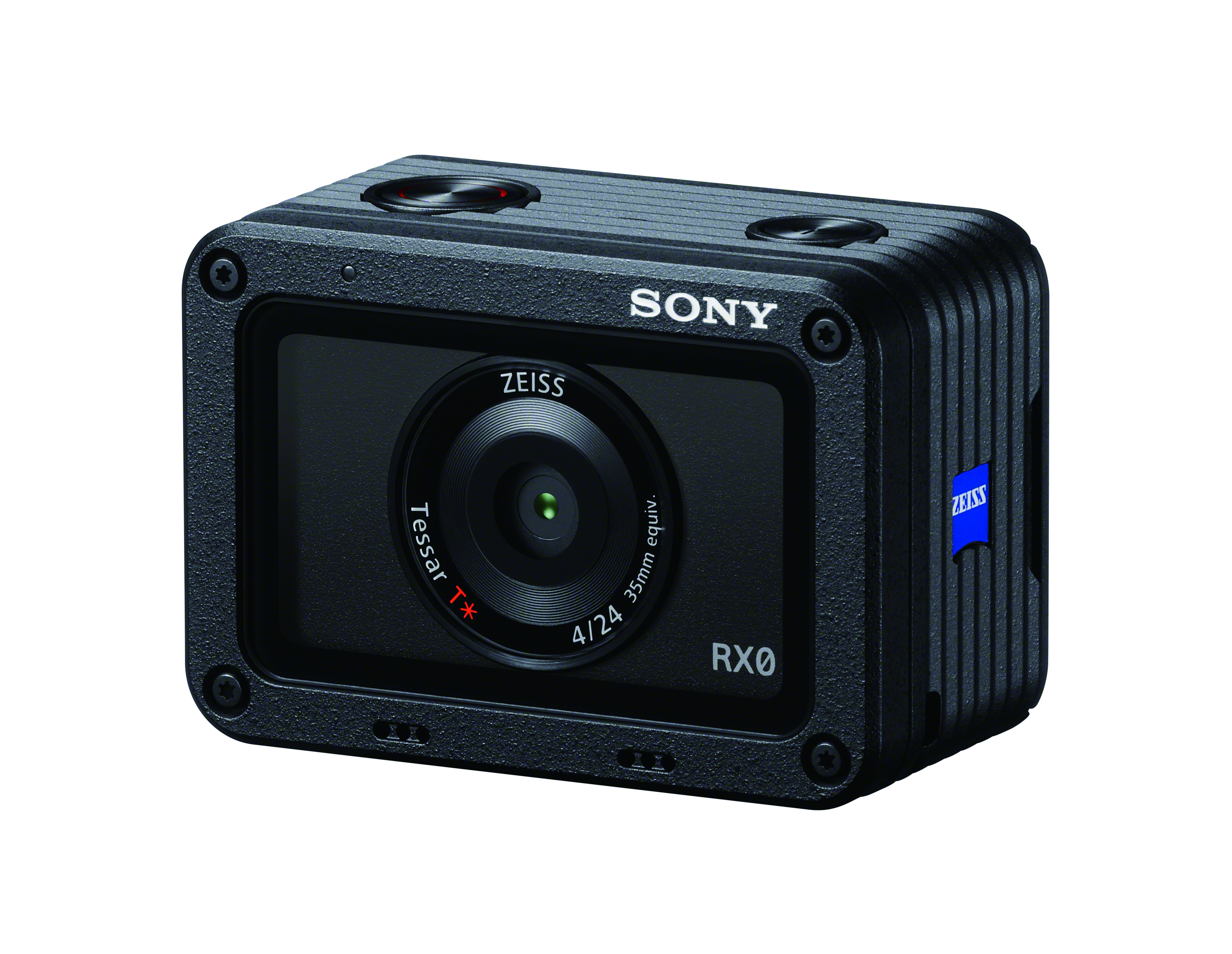
Sony RX0

=== RX0 ===
The RX0 was released in 2017. It is a small, tough waterproof camera, with a 1" sensor. It has a 24mm f4 equivalent Zeiss Tessar T* wide angle lens.

=== RX0 II ===
Released in 2019, the RX0 II has a tilt screen and built in 4K video recording technology.

== 1 Series ==
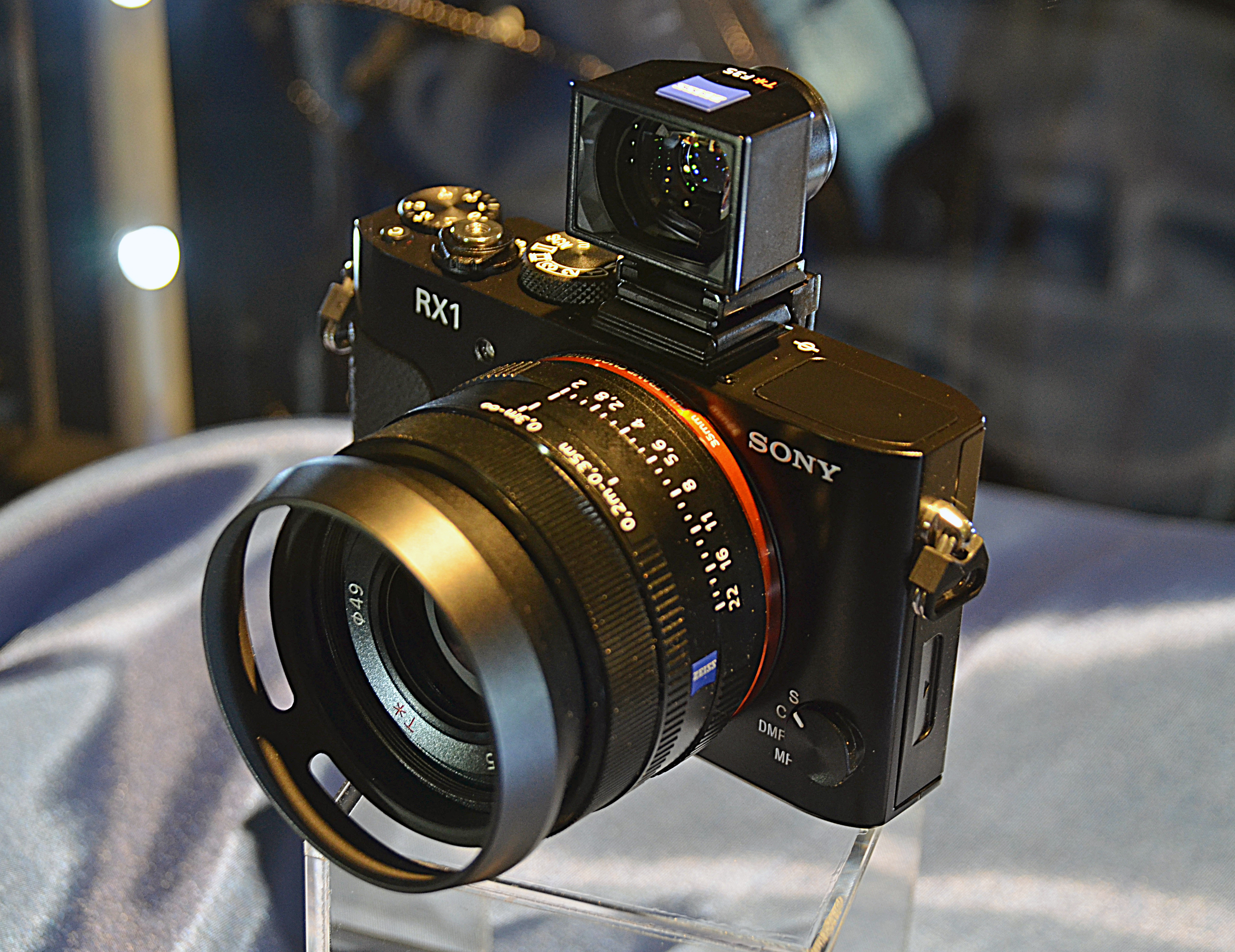
The RX1

=== RX1 ===
The DSC-RX1 was released in late 2012. It is an expert-level compact with a 24 megapixel full size sensor (notably used by the Sony α99). The sensitivity ranges from 100 to 25600 ISO. The lens has a focal length of 35 mm and aperture f/2. The camera has a 1,229,000 pixel screen of 7.5 cm diagonal.

=== RX1R ===
Released in the summer of 2013, the RX1R is a derivative of DSC-RX1 without a low-pass filter, as a full hybrid brand format, the Sony α7R.

=== RX1R II ===
The RX1R II was announced in October 2015. It has a 42.4 megapixel full frame sensor, also used by the Sony α7R II.

== 10 Series ==
=== RX10 ===
The DSC-RX10 was released in late 2013. It is a bridge expert equipped with a 1" sensor (13.2 x 8.8mm) 20 megapixels, the sensitivity extends from 125 to 12800. (expandable to ISO 74) The zoom lens has an equivalent focal range of 24–200 mm (zoom 8.3x) and a maximum aperture of f/2.8 over the whole range. The device has a screen of 7.5 cm of diagonal and a resolution of 1,228,800 pixels.

=== RX10 II ===
The DSC-RX10 II, marketed in July 2015, boasts a new faster sensor generation (Exmor RS) and the 4K video recording equipment. The autofocus was improved to 0.9 seconds on a moving object. The maximum shutter speed is 1/32000 seconds, the burst passes 16 i/s.

=== RX10 III ===
In March 2016, Sony introduced the third version of its DSC-RX10 camera, the III. It features a much longer maximum focal length lens (24-600 equiv.), improved image stabilization and new buttons and controls. It loses, however, the built-in ND filter of the RX10 II.

=== RX10 IV ===
The RX10 IV was announced in September 2017. It is similar to the RX III but features a new sensor with on-sensor phase detect (for faster and better autofocus tracking) and the ability to shoot 24 frames per second (with autofocus tracking). It loses, however, the PlayMemories App features of the RX10 III.

=== RX10 V ===
The RX10 V was announced in July 2026. It retains the 24–600 mm-equivalent f/2.4–4 Zeiss zoom lens while adding a 20.1-megapixel 1.0-type stacked Exmor RS sensor, a BIONZ XR processor and AI-powered subject-recognition autofocus. The camera supports blackout-free continuous shooting at up to 30 frames per second and 4K video recording at up to 120 frames per second.

== 100 Series ==
The DSC-RX100 was designated one of 25 best inventions of the Year 2012 by Time.

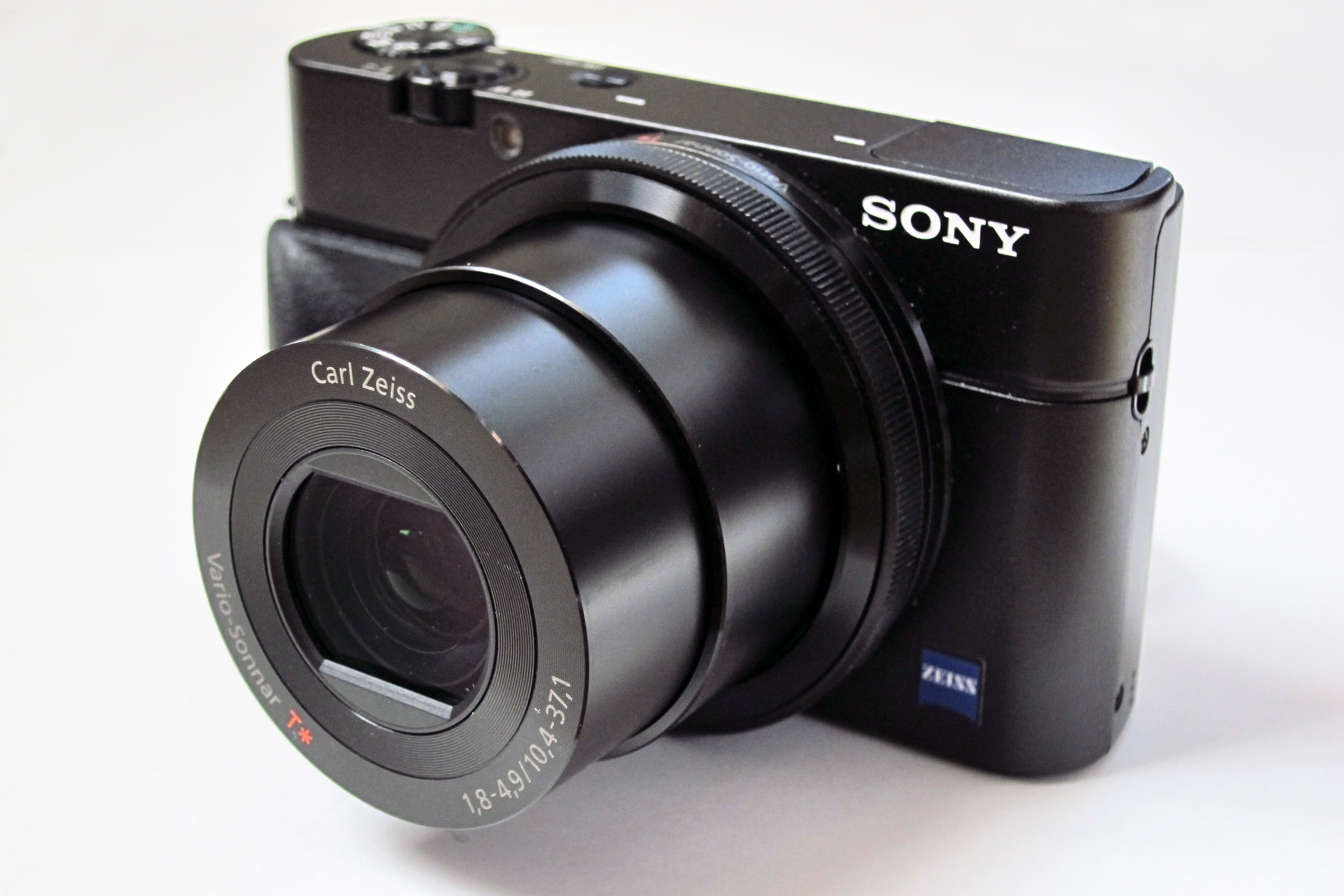
The first RX100

=== RX100 ===
The DSC-RX100 was released in summer 2012. It is a high-end compact with a 20 megapixel, 1" sensor (13.2 x 8.8mm) and 1080p video recording at 60 (NTSC) or 50 (PAL) frames per second. The ISO sensitivity ranges from 80 to 6400 ISO. The lens has an equivalent focal range 28–100 mm (1.1–3.9 in) (3.6x) and an aperture of f/1.8–4.9. The device has a screen of 7.5 cm diagonal of 1230000. Its target price at launch was €650.

In 2013, Hasselblad launched Stellar, based on the RX100. It used specific materials such as leather or wood. It was a device designed for professionals working in luxury and fashion and with celebrities.

=== RX100 II ===
The new version released in the summer of 2013. From an ergonomic point of view, this new model brings an ISO accessory shoe and a tilting screen. The technical developments concerning the sensor becomes backlit. The quality of low light images is thus improved as well as the reactivity (AF). The sensitivity range now extends from 100 to 12800 ISO. The Wi-Fi and NFC are integrated to control the camera with a smartphone through a dedicated application.

The dimensions remain the same as the RX100, except in thickness where the Mark II takes about three millimeters. Its target price at launch was €750.

On 26 November 2014, Hasselblad announced the Stellar II, based on the RX100 II. It is launched at €1,650, it replaces the first Stellar and offers several materials for grip: olive, drowning, padouk and carbon fiber.

=== RX100 III ===
Announced on 15 May 2014 and marketed in July, this new version offers a wider aperture telephoto, f/2.8 instead of f/4.9. The focal range is modified to receive more wide angle, it is equivalent to 24–70 (2.9x zoom). A new version of the microprocessor BIONZ (referred to as "X") more powerful and faster born. The housing incorporates an electronic viewfinder pop-up (a definition identical to that of the Sony α6000), like a flash (the latter taking the place of the ISO label, which disappears). The sensitivity is further enhanced with a range of from 125 to 25600. The screen offers expanded orientation with an angle of 180° up and 45° down, in particular to promote selfies. The dimensions remain the same compared to the RX100 II, except thick where the Mark III takes about three millimeters. The RX100 III, sold at €850, does not replace the previous RX100 and stayed for sale at a reduced price allowing Sony to offer a range of expert compactcameras.

=== RX100 IV ===
High resolution (720p, 2m33s, 25 MB) slow motion video, HFR mode RX100 VI

The RX100 IV was marketed in July 2015, it boasts a new faster sensor generation (Exmor RS) and 4K video. The autofocus progresses with 0.9 seconds on a moving object. The maximum shutter speed is 1/32000 s (electronic shutter), the speed priority continuous shooting mode averages 16 FPS. The stacked sensor design supports High Frame Rate (HFR) in which the camera can record 3-7 secs of video at 960/1,000fps, 480/500fps, or 240/250fps (NTSC/PAL). When played back at 1/40x rate, the result is super slow motion movies.

=== RX100 V ===
On October 6, 2016, Sony announced the launch of RX100 V.

=== RX100 VI ===
On June 5, 2018, Sony announced the RX100 VI. It has double the telephoto capability of its predecessor with its 24-200mm f2.8-4.5 Carl Zeiss Vario-Sonnar T* lens.

=== RX100 VII ===
On July 25, 2019, Sony announced the RX100 VII with a list price of $1,198 (US). Physically it is almost identical to the RX100 VI, with the addition of a microphone socket. The major improvement is a better auto-focus system. The number of phase detect auto-focus points has increased from 315 covering 65% of the image to 357 covering 68%. This supports Tracking Auto-focus and Eye Auto-focus on par with the Sony α9, Sony's top-of-the-line sports camera. The continuous shooting rate is reduced from 24 fps in the RX100 VI to 20 fps, albeit without blackout. A new short burst mode is introduced: a single press of the shutter release shoots 7 frames at 90 fps. Image stabilisation in video mode is improved.

== Comparison ==
Series		100 Series							10 Series				1 Series		
Model		RX100	RX100 II	RX100 III	RX100 IV	RX100 V	RX100 VI	RX100 VII	RX10	RX10 II	RX10 III	RX10 IV	RX1	RX1R	RX1R II
Announced		Jun; 2012	Jun; 2013	May; 2014	Jun; 2015	Oct; 2016	Jun; 2018	Jul; 2019	Oct; 2013	Jun; 2015	Mar; 2016	Sep; 2017	Sep; 2012	Jun; 2013	Oct; 2015
MSRP		$650	$650	$800	$1000			$1198	$1300		$1500	$1700	$2800		$3300
Sensor	Size	1" Type (13.2mm x 8.8mm)											Full frame (36mm x 24mm)		
Sensor	Resolution	20MP (5472 x 3648)											24MP (6000 x 4000)		42MP (7952 x 5304)
Sensor	Type	FSI	BSI		Stacked BSI				BSI	Stacked BSI			FSI		BSI
Sensor	AF-points	25 CD				315 PD + CD	315 PD + 25 CD	357 PD + 25 CD	25 CD			315 PD + CD	25 CD		399 PD + CD
Lens	Focal length	28-100mm		24-70mm			24-200mm		24-200mm		24-600mm		35mm		
Lens	Aperture	f/1.8-4.9		f/1.8-2.8			f/2.8-4.5		f/2.8		f/2.4-4		f/2		
Perfor- mance	Max. shutter speed Electronic	1/2000							1/3200		1/2000		1/4000		
Perfor- mance	Max. shutter speed Electronic	-			1/32000				-	1/32000			-		
Perfor- mance	max. FPS with AF+AE	10			16	24		20	10	14		24	5		
Perfor- mance	max. FPS with AF+AE	2.5		2.9	5.5	24		20	2.5	5.5		24	2		3
Screen	Resolution	960 x 1280 TFT LCD													
Screen	Size	3"													
Screen	Tilting	No	Yes										No		Yes
EVF	Resolution	No		1040 x 1385; OLED	1330 x 1773; OLED								No		768 x 1024; RBG
EVF	Magnification	No		0.59x					0.7x				No		0.74x
Video; Resolution	1280 x 720; 1824 x 1026; 1920 x 1080; 3820 x 2160	60fps		120fps 60fps	240fps 120fps 30fps				120fps 60fps	240fps 120fps 30fps			60fps		120fps 60fps
Video; Resolution	Full sensor readout	No		Yes (60fps)									No		
Video; Resolution	Codec	AVCHD		XAVC-S									AVCHD		XAVC-S
Video; Resolution	Max. bitrate	28Mbit/s		50Mbit/s	100Mbit/s				50Mbit/s	100Mbit/s			28Mbit/s		100Mbit/s
Connec- tors	USB	Yes, 2.0, Micro													
Connec- tors	HDMI	Yes, Micro													
Connec- tors	Hotshoe	No	MIS	No					MIS						
Connec- tors	Microphone	No						Yes	Yes				No		Yes
Connec- tors	Headphone	No						No	Yes				No		
Connec- tors	Wireless	No	802.11b/g/n + NFC										No		802.11b/g/n + NFC
Connec- tors	GPS	No													
Body	ND filter	No		Yes, 3 stops (ND8)		No			No						
Body	Battery	NP-BX1 (4.5Wh)							NP-FW50 (7.7Wh)				NP-BX1 (4.5Wh)		
Body	Weight	240g	281g	290g	298g	299g	301g	302g	813g		1051g	1095g	482g		507g
Body	Length × Width	102 x 58mm							129 x 88mm		133 x 94mm		113 x 65mm		
Body	Depth	36mm	38mm	41mm			43mm		102mm		127mm	145mm	70mm		72mm
Model		RX100	RX100 II	RX100 III	RX100 IV	RX100 V	RX100 VI	RX100 VII	RX10	RX10 II	RX10 III	RX10 IV	RX1	RX1R	RX1R II

== See also ==
- Sony α
- Sony Mavica
- Cyber-shot
- List of large sensor fixed-lens cameras
