= Sigma DP1x =

Digital camera model

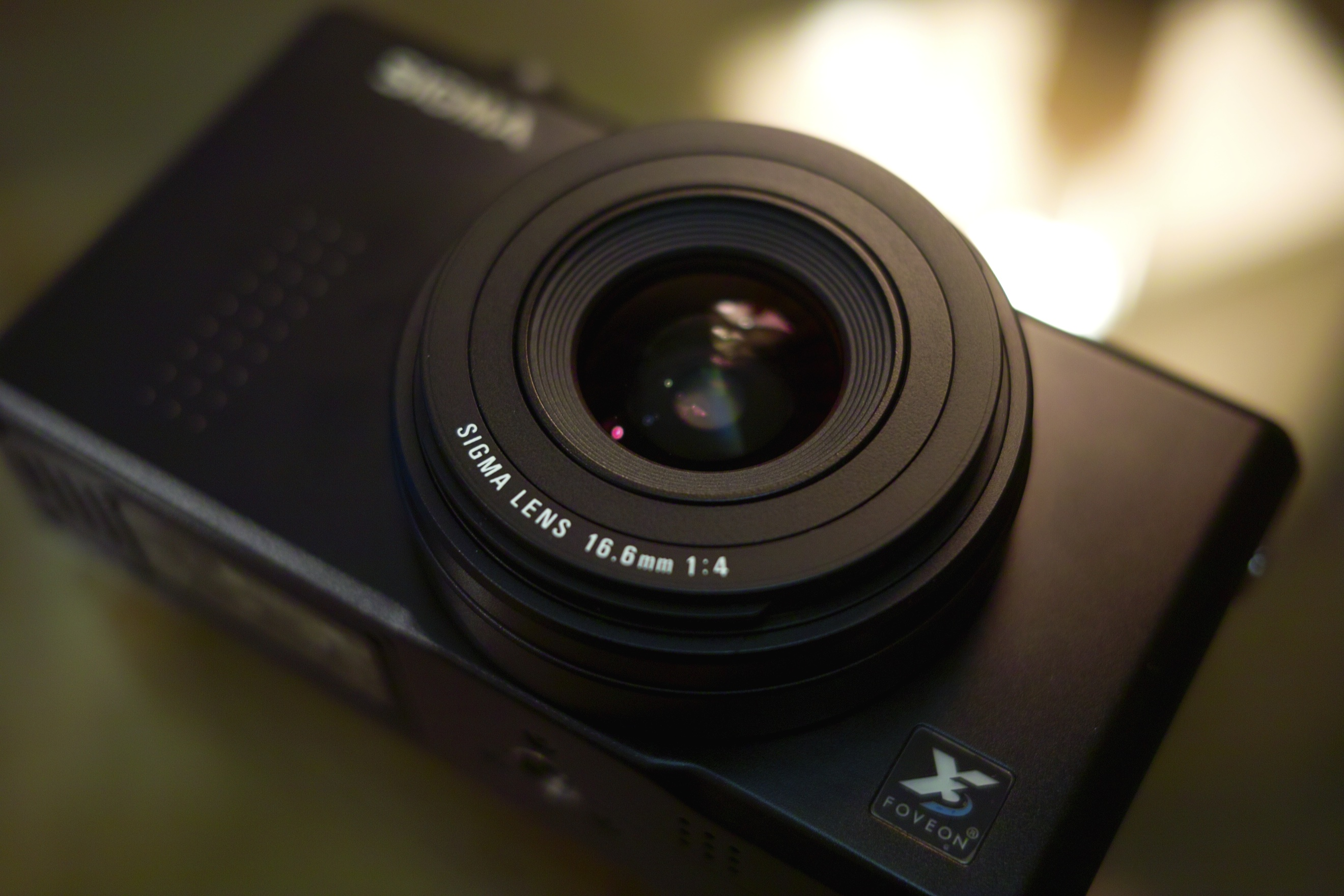

Overview
- Maker: Sigma
- Type: Large sensor fixed-lens camera
- Intro price: $800 MSRP

Lens
- Lens: 28mm equivalent 16.6mm f4
- F-numbers: f/4.0 to f/11

Sensor/medium
- Sensor: Foveon X3
- Sensor type: Foveon X3 (CMOS)
- Sensor size: 20.7 x 13.8mm (APS-C type)
- Sensor maker: Dongbu/Daewoo
- Maximum resolution: 2652 × 1768 × 3 (14.1 million effective pixels, 4.69 megapixel output image size)
- Film speed: ISO 100-3200
- Recording medium: SD/MMC card

Focusing
- Focus: Internal, micromotor
- Focus areas: .3m to Infinity

Flash
- Flash: Yes, integrated and standard hotshoe
- Compatible flashes: Standard Hotshoe

Shutter
- Shutter speeds: 1/2000 @ f/10 to 30s

Viewfinder
- Viewfinder: N/A

Image processing
- Image processor: True II
- White balance: No

General
- LCD screen: 2.5 inches with 230,000 dots
- Battery: BP-31
- AV port(s): USB/AV Combo Port
- Data port(s): USB/AV Combo Port
- Dimensions: 113 x 60 x 50mm (4.45 x 2.36 x 1.97 inches)
- Weight: 250 g (9 oz) including battery

The Sigma DP1x is a large sensor digital compact camera announced by Sigma Corporation on February 20, 2010.

== See also ==
- List of large sensor fixed-lens cameras

Type	Lens	2002	2003	2004	2005	2006	2007	2008	2009	2010	2011	2012	2013	2014	2015	2016	2017	2018	2019	2020	2021	2022	2023	2024	2025
MILC	Full frame																								
MILC	Full frame																	BF							
MILC	Full frame																	fp L							
MILC	Full frame																	fp							
MILC	APS-H															SD Quattro H									
MILC	APS-C															SD Quattro									
Compact (Prime lens)	Wide														dp0 Quattro										
Compact (Prime lens)	Wide							DP1		DP1s	DP1x		DP1 Merrill		dp1 Quattro										
Compact (Prime lens)	Normal								DP2	DP2s	DP2x		DP2 Merrill	dp2 Quattro											
Compact (Prime lens)	Tele												DP3 Merrill	dp3 Quattro											
DSLR	APS-C	SD9		SD10				SD14		SD15		SD1	SD1 Merrill												
