= List of large sensor fixed-lens cameras =

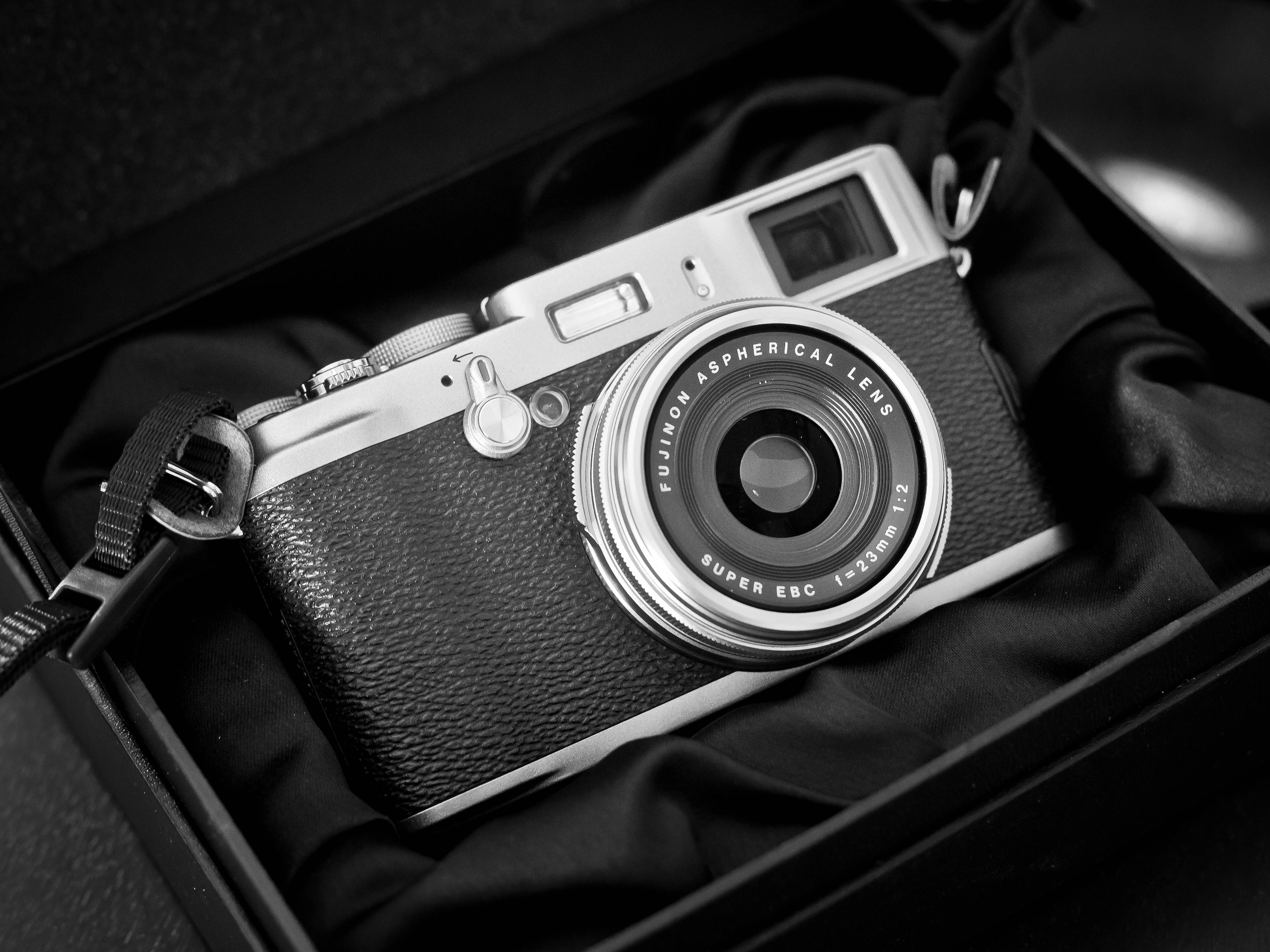
Fujifilm FinePix X100

This is a list of large-sensor fixed-lens cameras, also known as premium compact cameras or high-end point-and-shoot cameras. These are digital cameras with a non-interchangeable lens and a 1.0‑type (“1‑inch”) image sensor or larger, excluding smartphones and camcorders.

Without a lens mount, a substantial portion of the lens assembly can be fitted inside of the camera body right up to the sensor. This makes it possible to fit a larger sensor or a lens with a larger aperture compared to a camera and interchangeable lens combination of similar size.

== Cameras with a prime lens ==
The Leica Q series, Fujifilm X100 series, and Ricoh GR series are popular cameras in this category. This list excludes cameras with removable sensors, such as the Phase One XC.

Model	Sensor size	Crop factor	Focal length (Note: 35mm equivalent.)	Aperture	Pixel count	Weight	EVF	Release year	Availability
Fujifilm GFX100RF	Medium format	0.8	28mm	f/4.0	102 MP	735g	Yes	2025	Current
Leica Q3 Monochrom	Full frame	1.0	28mm	f/1.7	60 MP	746g	Yes	2025	Current
Leica Q3 43	Full frame	1.0	43mm	f/2.0	60 MP	772g	Yes	2024	Current
Leica Q3	Full frame	1.0	28mm	f/1.7	60 MP	743g	Yes	2023	Current
Leica Q2	Full frame	1.0	28mm	f/1.7	47 MP	734g	Yes	2019	Discontinued
Leica Q / Q-P	Full frame	1.0	28mm	f/1.7	24 MP	640g	Yes	2015	Discontinued
Zeiss ZX1	Full frame	1.0	35mm	f/2.0	37 MP	837g	Yes	2020	Discontinued
Sony RX1R III	Full frame	1.0	35mm	f/2.0	60 MP	498g	Yes	2025	Current
Sony RX1R II	Full frame	1.0	35mm	f/2.0	42 MP	507g	Yes	2015	Discontinued
Sony RX1 / RX1R	Full frame	1.0	35mm	f/2.0	24 MP	482g	Opt. (Note: Optional accessory.)	2012	Discontinued
Fujifilm X100VI	APS-C	1.5	35mm	f/2.0	40 MP	521g	Yes	2024	Current
Fujifilm X100V	APS-C	1.5	35mm	f/2.0	26 MP	478g	Yes	2020	Discontinued
Fujifilm X100F	APS-C	1.5	35mm	f/2.0	24 MP	469g	Yes	2017	Discontinued
Fujifilm X100T	APS-C	1.5	35mm	f/2.0	16 MP	440g	Yes	2014	Discontinued
Fujifilm X100S	APS-C	1.5	35mm	f/2.0	16 MP	445g	Yes	2013	Discontinued
Fujifilm X100	APS-C	1.5	35mm	f/2.0	12 MP	445g	Yes	2010	Discontinued
Fujifilm XF10	APS-C	1.5	28mm	f/2.8	24 MP	279g	No	2018	Discontinued
Fujifilm X70	APS-C	1.5	28mm	f/2.8	16 MP	340g	No	2016	Discontinued
Ricoh GR IIIx	APS-C	1.5	40mm	f/2.8	24 MP	262g	No	2021	Current
Ricoh GR IV	APS-C	1.5	28mm	f/2.8	26 MP	262g	No	2025	Current
Ricoh GR III	APS-C	1.5	28mm	f/2.8	24 MP	257g	No	2019	Discontinued
Ricoh GR II	APS-C	1.5	28mm	f/2.8	16 MP	251g	No	2015	Discontinued
Ricoh GR	APS-C	1.5	28mm	f/2.8	16 MP	245g	No	2013	Discontinued
Nikon Coolpix A	APS-C	1.5	28mm	f/2.8	16 MP	299g	No	2013	Discontinued
Leica X-U	APS-C	1.5	35mm	f/1.7	16 MP	635g	No	2016	Discontinued
Leica X	APS-C	1.5	35mm	f/1.7	16 MP	486g	Opt.	2014	Discontinued
Leica X2 / X-E	APS-C	1.5	36mm	f/2.8	16 MP	345g	Opt.	2012	Discontinued
Leica X1	APS-C	1.5	36mm	f/2.8	12 MP	306g	No	2009	Discontinued
Sigma dp3 Quattro	APS-C	1.5	75mm	f/2.8	20 MP	417g	No	2015	Discontinued
Sigma DP3 Merrill	APS-C	1.5	75mm	f/2.8	15 MP	452g	No	2013	Discontinued
Sigma dp2 Quattro	APS-C	1.5	45mm	f/2.8	20 MP	462g	No	2014	Discontinued
Sigma DP2 Merrill	APS-C	1.5	45mm	f/2.8	15 MP	407g	No	2012	Discontinued
Sigma dp1 Quattro	APS-C	1.5	28mm	f/2.8	20 MP	477g	No	2014	Discontinued
Sigma dp0 Quattro	APS-C	1.5	21mm	f/4.0	20 MP	552g	No	2015	Discontinued
Sigma DP1 Merrill	APS-C	1.5	28mm	f/2.8	15 MP	412g	No	2012	Discontinued
Sigma DP2x	APS-C	1.7	41mm	f/2.8	5 MP	312g	No	2011	Discontinued
Sigma DP2s	APS-C	1.7	41mm	f/2.8	5 MP	312g	No	2010	Discontinued
Sigma DP2	APS-C	1.7	41mm	f/2.8	5 MP	312g	No	2009	Discontinued
Sigma DP1x	APS-C	1.7	28mm	f/4.0	5 MP	302g	No	2010	Discontinued
Sigma DP1s	APS-C	1.7	28mm	f/4.0	5 MP	302s	No	2009	Discontinued
Sigma DP1	APS-C	1.7	28mm	f/4.0	5 MP	302g	No	2008	Discontinued
DJI Pocket 3	1.0-type	2.7	20mm	f/2.0	9 MP	179g	No	2023	Current
Sony RX0 II	1.0-type	2.7	24mm	f/4.0	15 MP	132g	No	2019	Current
Sony RX0	1.0-type	2.7	24mm	f/4.0	15 MP	110g	No	2017	Discontinued
Sony ZV-1F	1.0-type	2.7	20mm	f/2.0	20 MP	256g	No	2022	Current
Canon V10	1.0-type	2.7	18mm	f/2.8	20 MP	211g	No	2023	Current
Sealife DC2000	1.0-type	2.7	31mm	f/1.8	20 MP	234g	No	2017	Discontinued
Panasonic CM10 (Note: The Panasonic CM10 is essentially the same device as the Panasonic CM1 except without the ability to make a phone call, which makes it not a smartphone.)	1.0-type	2.7	28mm	f/2.8	20 MP	204g	No	2016	Discontinued
DxO ONE (Note: The DxO ONE was designed to be attached to a smartphone. However, it can be used as a standalone camera because it has a small screen that can display live view.)	1.0-type	2.7	32mm	f/1.8	20 MP	108g	No	2015	Discontinued
Fujifilm X half	1.0-type	2.9	32mm	f/2.8	18 MP	240g	OVF (Note: Optical viewfinder.)	2025	Current

== Cameras with a zoom lens ==
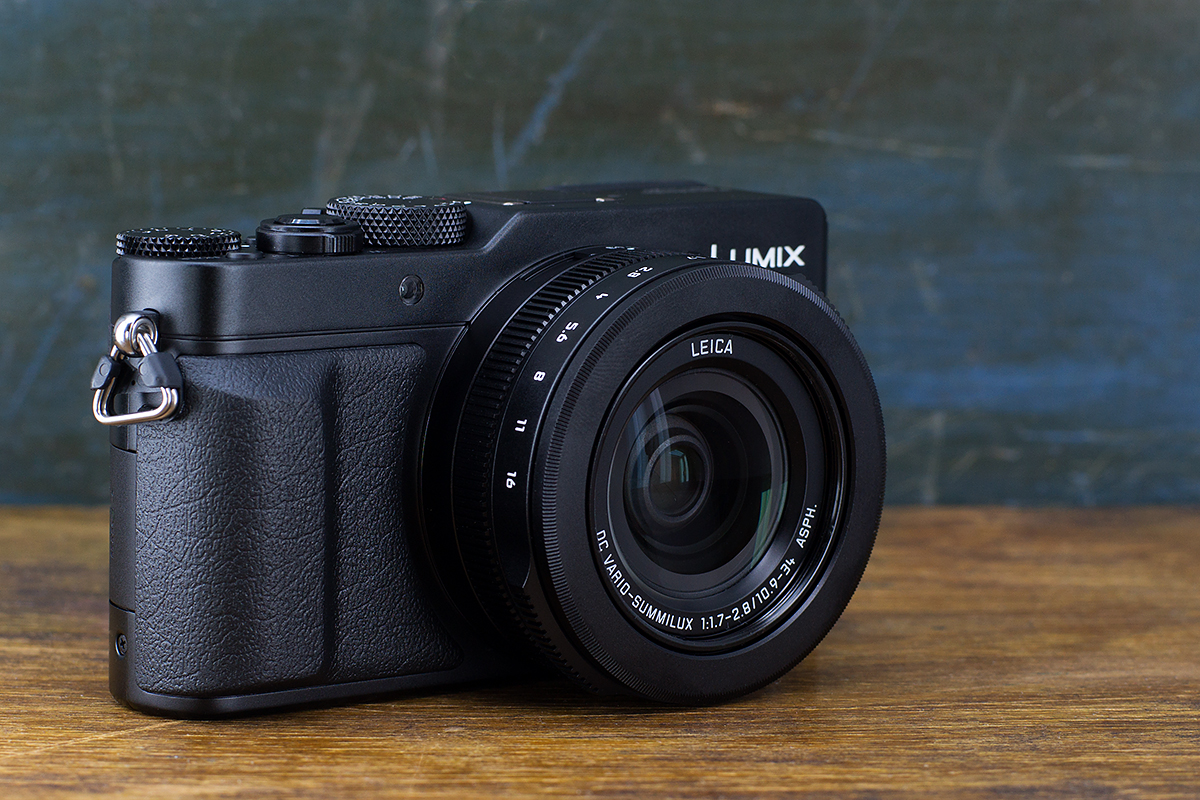
Panasonic Lumix LX100

Almost all zoom models with larger sensors have been discontinued in favor of their interchangeable lens counterparts that offer more flexibility.

Current compact models market themselves as vlogging cameras (e.g. Sony ZV-1 series and Canon G7 X series) or travel zoom cameras (e.g. Sony RX100 series and Panasonic ZS series), emphasizing functionality that smartphone cameras still lack.

Current large models are bridge cameras (e.g. Sony RX10 series and Panasonic FZ series) that include all-in-one superzoom lenses for maximum versatility.

Model	Sensor size	Crop factor	Focal length		Aperture		Pixel count	Weight	EVF	Release year	Availability
Model	Sensor size	Crop factor	Wide	Tele	Wide	Tele	Pixel count	Weight	EVF	Release year	Availability
Leica X Vario	APS-C	1.5	28mm	70mm	f/3.5	f/6.4	16 MP	680g	Opt.	2013	Discontinued
Canon G1 X Mark III	APS-C	1.6	24mm	72mm	f/2.8	f/5.6	24 MP	399g	Yes	2017	Discontinued
Sony R1	APS-C	1.7	24mm	120mm	f/2.8	f/4.8	10 MP	995g	Yes	2005	Discontinued
Canon G1 X Mark II	1.5-type	1.9	24mm	120mm	f/2.0	f/3.9	13 MP	553g	Opt.	2014	Discontinued
Canon G1 X	1.5-type	1.9	28mm	112mm	f/2.8	f/5.8	14 MP	534g	No (Note: Optical viewfinder (OVF) only.)	2012	Discontinued
Canon V1	1.4-type	2.0	16mm	50mm	f/2.8	f/4.5	22 MP	426g	No	2025	Current
Leica D-Lux 8	4/3-type	2.2	24mm	75mm	f/1.7	f/2.8	17 MP	396g	Yes	2024	Current
Leica D-Lux 7	4/3-type	2.2	24mm	75mm	f/1.7	f/2.8	17 MP	403g	Yes	2018	Discontinued
Panasonic LX100 II	4/3-type	2.2	24mm	75mm	f/1.7	f/2.8	17 MP	392g	Yes	2018	Discontinued
Leica D-Lux	4/3-type	2.2	24mm	75mm	f/1.7	f/2.8	13 MP	405g	Yes	2014	Discontinued
Panasonic LX100	4/3-type	2.2	24mm	75mm	f/1.7	f/2.8	13 MP	393g	Yes	2014	Discontinued
Sony RX10 IV	1.0-type	2.7	24mm	600mm	f/2.4	f/4.0	20 MP	1095g	Yes	2017	Discontinued
Sony RX10 III	1.0-type	2.7	24mm	600mm	f/2.4	f/4.0	20 MP	1095g	Yes	2016	Discontinued
Sony RX10 II	1.0-type	2.7	24mm	200mm	f/2.8	f/2.8	20 MP	813g	Yes	2015	Discontinued
Sony RX10	1.0-type	2.7	24mm	200mm	f/2.8	f/2.8	20 MP	813g	Yes	2013	Discontinued
Sony RX100 VII	1.0-type	2.7	24mm	200mm	f/2.8	f/4.5	20 MP	302g	Yes	2019	Current
Sony RX100 VI	1.0-type	2.7	24mm	200mm	f/2.8	f/4.5	20 MP	301g	Yes	2018	Discontinued
Sony RX100 V / VA	1.0-type	2.7	24mm	70mm	f/1.8	f/2.8	20 MP	299g	Yes	2016	Discontinued
Sony RX100 IV	1.0-type	2.7	24mm	70mm	f/1.8	f/2.8	20 MP	298g	Yes	2015	Discontinued
Sony RX100 III	1.0-type	2.7	24mm	70mm	f/1.8	f/2.8	20 MP	290g	Yes	2014	Discontinued
Sony RX100 II	1.0-type	2.7	28mm	100mm	f/1.8	f/4.9	20 MP	281g	Opt.	2013	Discontinued
Sony RX100	1.0-type	2.7	28mm	100mm	f/1.8	f/4.9	20 MP	240g	No	2012	Discontinued
Sony QX100	1.0-type	2.7	28mm	100mm	f/1.8	f/4.9	20 MP	179g	No (Note: This lens-style camera has no screen or viewfinder at all. It was designed to be attached to a smartphone so that the phone’s screen could be used as the camera’s display.)	2014	Discontinued
Sony ZV-1 II	1.0-type	2.7	18mm	50mm	f/1.8	f/4.0	20 MP	292g	No	2023	Current
Sony ZV-1	1.0-type	2.7	24mm	70mm	f/1.8	f/2.8	20 MP	294g	No	2020	Current
Canon G3 X	1.0-type	2.7	24mm	600mm	f/2.8	f/5.6	20 MP	733g	Opt.	2015	Discontinued
Canon G5 X Mark II	1.0-type	2.7	24mm	120mm	f/1.8	f/2.8	20 MP	340g	Yes	2019	Discontinued
Canon G5 X	1.0-type	2.7	24mm	100mm	f/1.8	f/2.8	20 MP	377g	Yes	2015	Discontinued
Canon G7 X Mark III	1.0-type	2.7	24mm	100mm	f/1.8	f/2.8	20 MP	304g	No	2019	Current
Canon G7 X Mark II	1.0-type	2.7	24mm	100mm	f/1.8	f/2.8	20 MP	319g	No	2016	Discontinued
Canon G7 X	1.0-type	2.7	24mm	100mm	f/1.8	f/2.8	20 MP	302g	No	2014	Discontinued
Canon G9 X Mark II	1.0-type	2.7	28mm	84mm	f/2.0	f/4.9	20 MP	206g	No	2017	Discontinued
Canon G9 X	1.0-type	2.7	28mm	84mm	f/2.0	f/4.9	20 MP	209g	No	2015	Discontinued
Panasonic FZ2500 (Note: Known as the FZ2000 outside of North America.)	1.0-type	2.7	24mm	480mm	f/2.8	f/4.5	20 MP	966g	Yes	2016	Discontinued
Leica V-Lux 5	1.0-type	2.7	25mm	400mm	f/2.8	f/4.0	20 MP	812g	Yes	2019	Discontinued
Panasonic FZ1000 II	1.0-type	2.7	25mm	400mm	f/2.8	f/4.0	20 MP	810g	Yes	2019	Discontinued
Leica V-Lux	1.0-type	2.7	25mm	400mm	f/2.8	f/4.0	20 MP	830g	Yes	2014	Discontinued
Panasonic FZ1000	1.0-type	2.7	25mm	400mm	f/2.8	f/4.0	20 MP	831g	Yes	2014	Discontinued
Leica C-Lux	1.0-type	2.7	24mm	360mm	f/3.3	f/6.4	20 MP	340g	Yes	2018	Discontinued
Panasonic ZS300	1.0-type	2.7	24mm	360mm	f/3.3	f/6.4	20 MP	337g	No	2026	Current
Panasonic ZS200 (Note: Known as the TZ200, TZ202, TZ220, ZS220, or TX2 outside of North America.)	1.0-type	2.7	24mm	360mm	f/3.3	f/6.4	20 MP	340g	Yes	2018	Discontinued
Panasonic ZS100 (Note: Known as the TZ100, TZ101, TZ110, ZS110, or TX1 outside of North America.)	1.0-type	2.7	25mm	250mm	f/2.8	f/5.9	20 MP	310g	Yes	2016	Discontinued
Panasonic LX10 (Note: Known as the LX15 outside of North America.)	1.0-type	2.7	24mm	72mm	f/1.4	f/2.8	20 MP	310g	No	2016	Discontinued

== See also ==
- List of large sensor camera phones
- List of bridge cameras
- List of superzoom compact cameras
- List of lightest mirrorless cameras
- Sony RX
- Fujifilm X
- Canon PowerShot G
- Point-and-shoot camera
