= Sigma DP2 Merrill =

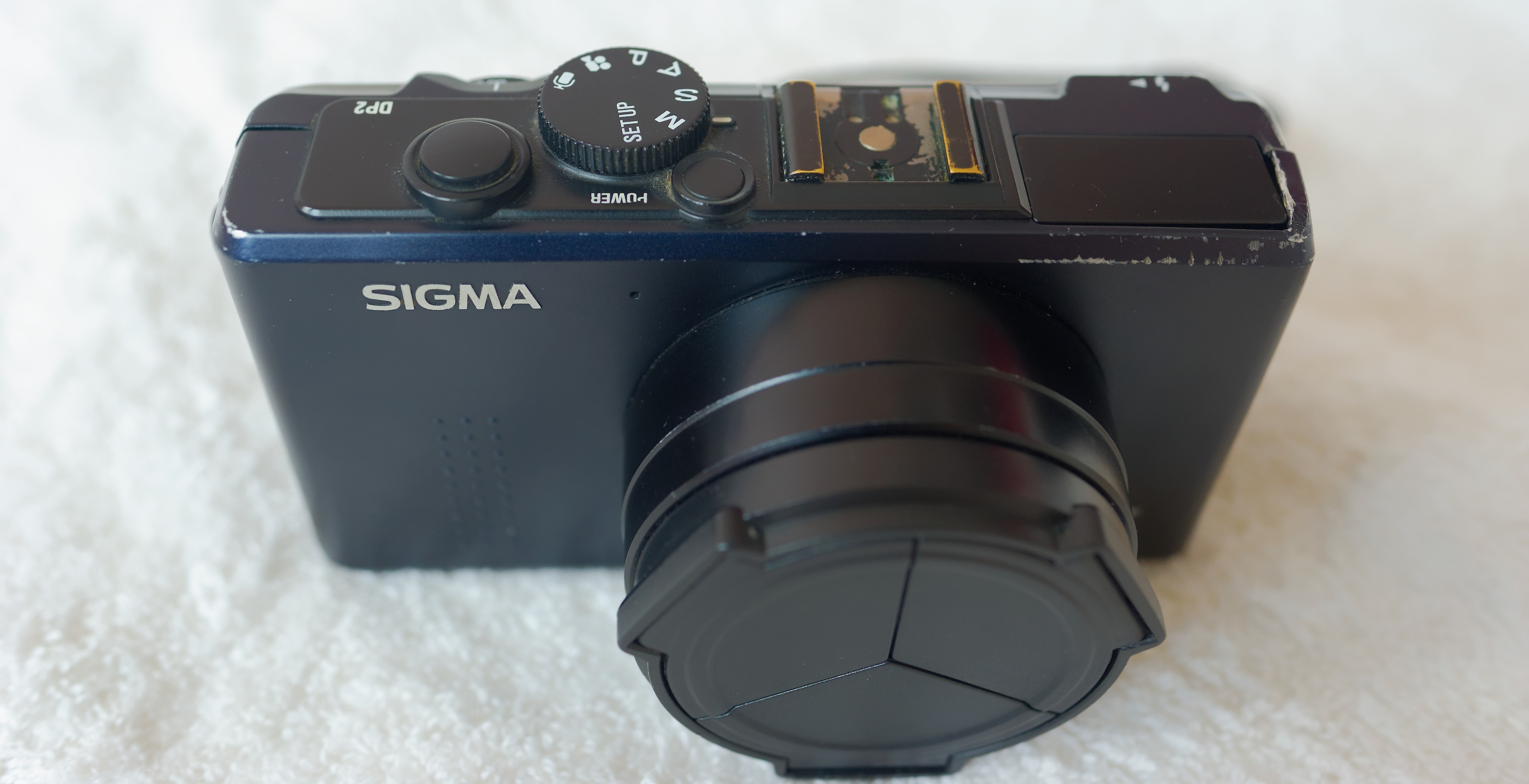
- Maker: Sigma Corporation

Lens
- Lens: 30 mm (35 mm equivalent 45 mm) f/2.8

Sensor/medium
- Sensor: 23.5 mm × 15.7 mm Foveon X3 Sensor CMOS
- Maximum resolution: 4704 × 3136 × 3 (44.3 million effective pixels, 14.8 megapixel output image size)
- Film speed: ISO equivalency 50-6400 1/3 EV Steps up to±3EV
- Storage media: SD card

Focusing
- Focus areas: Contrast Detect AF

Exposure/metering
- Exposure modes: Program AE [P], Shutter Priority AE [S], Aperture Priority AE [Ae], Manual [M]
- Exposure metering: TTL Full Aperture Metering
- Metering modes: Evaluative Metering, Center-Weighted Average Metering, Spot Metering

Flash
- Flash: Hotshoe

Shutter
- Shutter: Electronically controlled lens shutter
- Shutter speed range: 30 to 1/2000 seconds
- Continuous shooting: 4 frames per second at full quality, up to 5 fps at lower quality

Viewfinder
- Viewfinder: none

Image processing
- White balance: Auto, Presets (6), Custom

General
- LCD screen: 3 Inch, 920,000 dots
- Battery: Lithium Ion battery BP-41
- Dimensions: 121.5×66.7×59.2 mm (4.78×2.63×2.33 in)
- Weight: 355 g (13 oz) empty (no battery, no memory card)
- Made in: Japan

The Sigma DP2 Merrill is a high-end compact digital camera made by Sigma Corporation. It features a 46-megapixel Foveon X3 sensor (4704 × 3136 × 3 layers) and a 30mm f/2.8 fixed lens (45mm in 35mm equivalent focal length).

== See also ==
- List of large sensor fixed-lens cameras

Type	Lens	2002	2003	2004	2005	2006	2007	2008	2009	2010	2011	2012	2013	2014	2015	2016	2017	2018	2019	2020	2021	2022	2023	2024	2025
MILC	Full frame																								
MILC	Full frame																	BF							
MILC	Full frame																	fp L							
MILC	Full frame																	fp							
MILC	APS-H															SD Quattro H									
MILC	APS-C															SD Quattro									
Compact (Prime lens)	Wide														dp0 Quattro										
Compact (Prime lens)	Wide							DP1		DP1s	DP1x		DP1 Merrill		dp1 Quattro										
Compact (Prime lens)	Normal								DP2	DP2s	DP2x		DP2 Merrill	dp2 Quattro											
Compact (Prime lens)	Tele												DP3 Merrill	dp3 Quattro											
DSLR	APS-C	SD9		SD10				SD14		SD15		SD1	SD1 Merrill												
