= Sony ZV-1 =

20MP Sony compact digital camera with a 1-inch image sensor

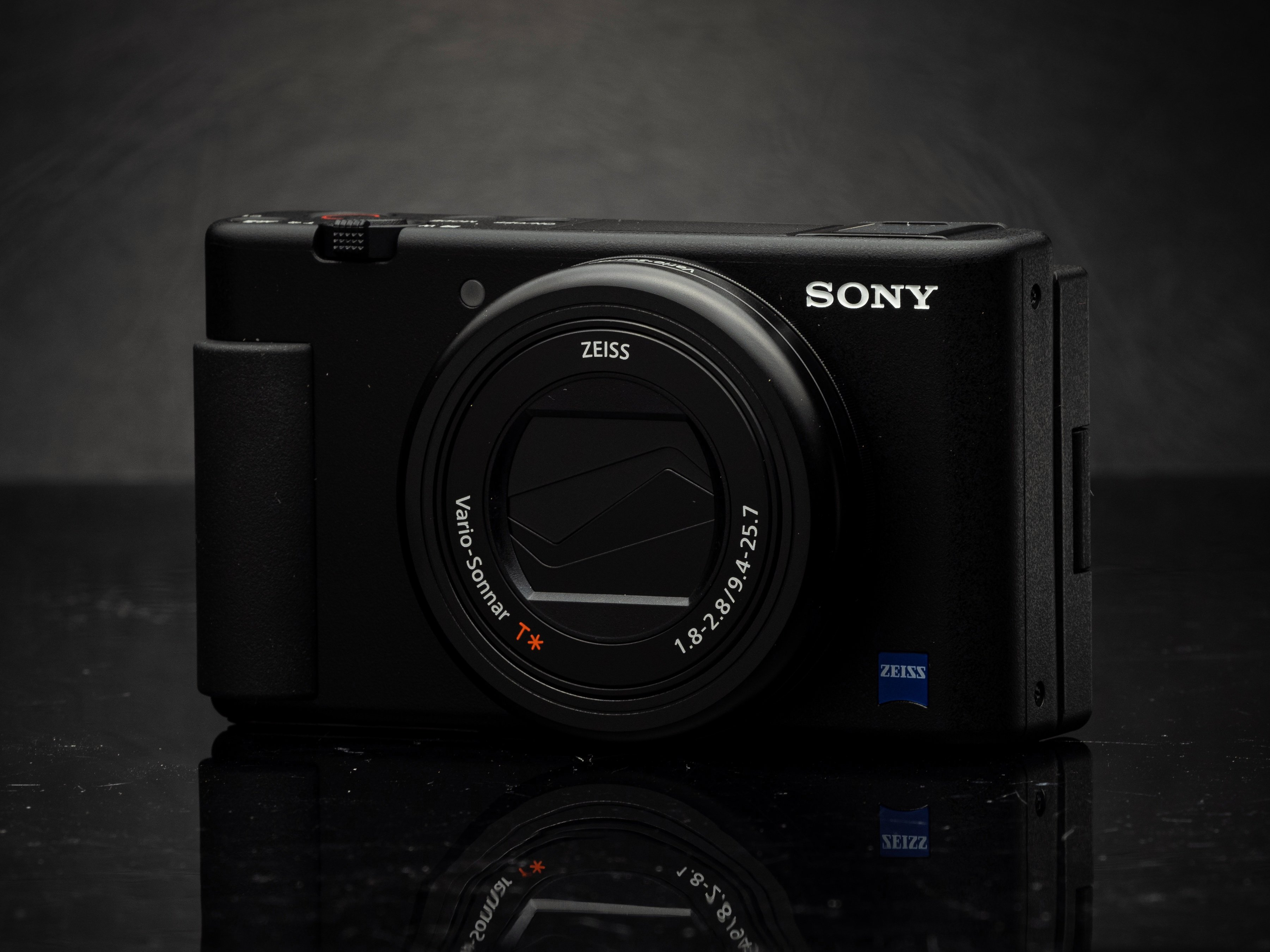

Overview
- Maker: Sony Group
- Type: Large sensor fixed-lens camera

Lens
- Lens: Fixed, non-interchangeable

Sensor/medium
- Sensor type: Exmor RS CMOS sensor
- Sensor size: 1‑inch (13.2 mm × 8.8 mm) (aspect ratio 3:2)
- Maximum resolution: 20 megapixels

General
- LCD screen: 3.0" screen
- Battery: Sony NP-BX1
- Replaced by: Sony ZV-1 II

The Sony ZV-1 is a 20MP Sony compact digital camera with a 1-inch image sensor. It is similar to the Sony RX100 V with extra features, such as features for vlogging and quick video production. The camera can record video in XAVC S and AVCHD formats. The camera was released in May 2020 as part of Sony's ZV line-up. Its launch price was $799, with a pre-order price of $749. This was the first camera in the Sony ZV line-up. The camera comes in two different colours, black or white.

== Specifications ==
The ZV-1 has the following specifications:

- Retractable lens
- F-stop: F1.8–2.8
- Zoom range (full‑frame-equivalent): 24–70mm
- Phase detection autofocus
- Video: 4K at up to 30fps, 1080p at up to 120fps; high-speed photography up to 960fps (at lower resolutions)
- Wireless: Wi-Fi, Bluetooth (for wireless control and GPS geotagging)
- ISO: 125–6400
- Compatible with Sony GP-VPT2BT selfie-stick/tripod
- Raw image format (ARW)
- Inbuilt directional microphone
- 3.5mm TRS stereo mini jack to connect external microphone
- Micro-USB charging port
- Mini HDMI port
- Flash hotshoe
- Swivel touchscreen display
- Product showcase setting

== See also ==
- Sony Cyber-shot DSC-RX100 series
- List of large sensor fixed-lens cameras
