= Sigma dp0 Quattro =

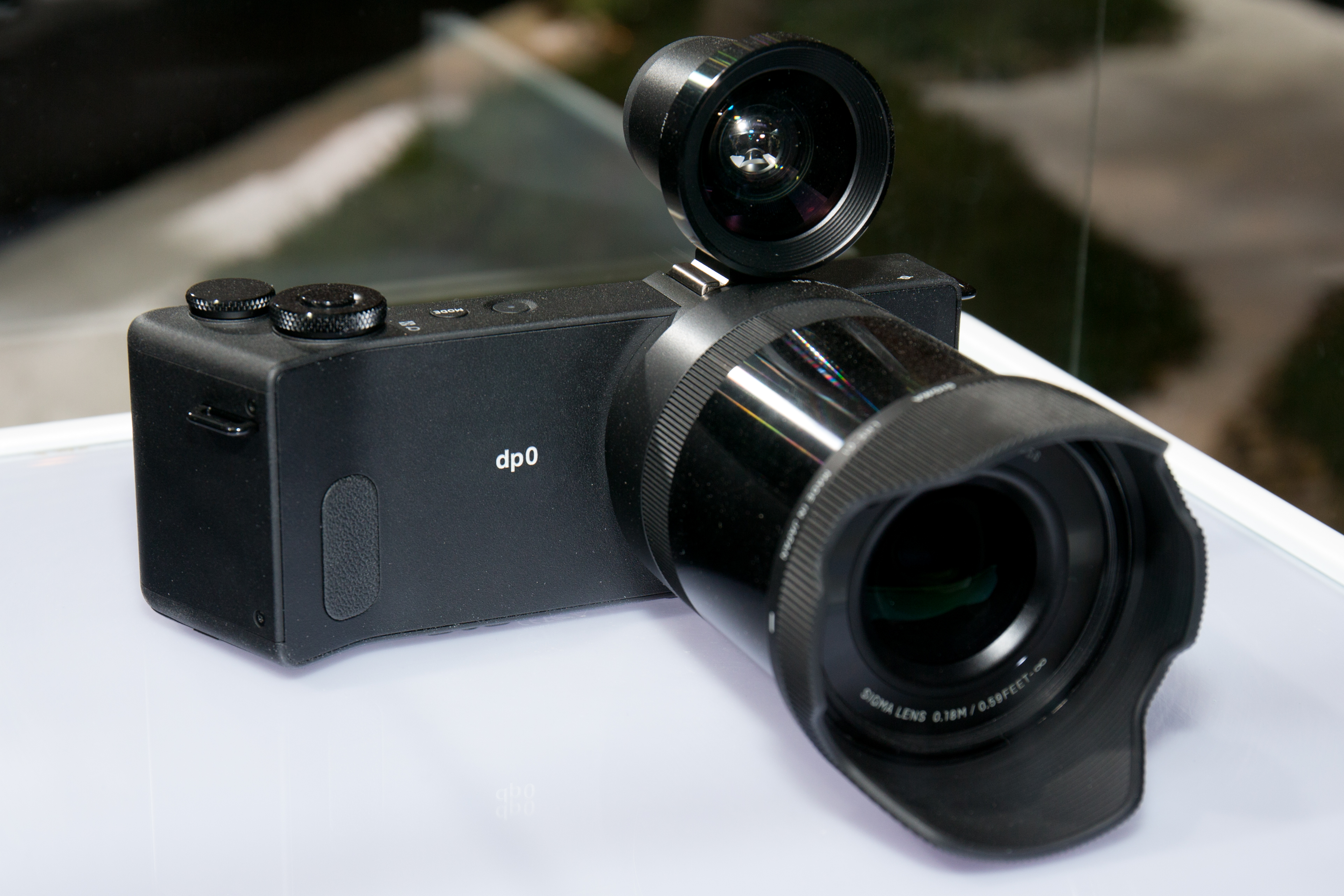

Overview
- Maker: Sigma
- Type: Large sensor fixed-lens camera
- Released: 10 February 2015

Lens
- Lens: 14 mm (21 mm equivalent)
- F-numbers: f/4 - f/22

Sensor/medium
- Sensor type: CMOS (Foveon X3)
- Sensor size: 23.5 x 15.7mm (APS-C)
- Maximum resolution: 5424 x 3616 (19.6 megapixels - 39.226.368 photosites)
- Film speed: 100-6400
- Recording medium: SD card

Focusing
- Focus areas: 9 focus points

Shutter
- Shutter speeds: 1/2000s to 30s

Image processing
- Image processor: TRUE III engine
- White balance: Yes

General
- LCD screen: 3 inches with 920,000 dots
- Dimensions: 161 x 67 x 82mm (6.34 x 2.64 x 3.23 inches)
- Weight: 500 g (18 oz) (excluding battery and card)

The Sigma dp0 Quattro is a discontinued fixed-focal length APS-C digital point-and-shoot camera, announced by Sigma on February 10, 2015.

Like other cameras in the dp Quattro series, it features a 29-megapixel Foveon X3 sensor, but is said to produce images equivalent to that of a 39-megapixel Bayer sensor camera.

The dp0 Quattro has the widest focal length compared to other models of the dp Quattro range, with a 35 mm equivalent focal length of 21mm.

== Reception ==
PCMag called the dp0 Quattro a "niche product", due to its fixed wide angle lens, with some quirks such as its uncommon grip shape, slow processing and writing per capture and battery life, but praised it for the quality of images produced, with its superior sensor and lens, giving the dp0 Quattro a rating of 3.5 out of 5.

During the CP+ show held in 2015, USA Today did a first impressions review of the dp0 Quattro, which mentioned that the improved sensor on the dp0 Quattro had "faster processing times", compared to older Foveon-based cameras, but still pales in speed compared to other cameras in the market at that time. The camera is described with low lens distortion despite its wide angle lens but with poor battery life, with a conclusion that the camera is "endearingly oddball".

== See also ==
- List of large sensor fixed-lens cameras

Type	Lens	2002	2003	2004	2005	2006	2007	2008	2009	2010	2011	2012	2013	2014	2015	2016	2017	2018	2019	2020	2021	2022	2023	2024	2025
MILC	Full frame																								
MILC	Full frame																	BF							
MILC	Full frame																	fp L							
MILC	Full frame																	fp							
MILC	APS-H															SD Quattro H									
MILC	APS-C															SD Quattro									
Compact (Prime lens)	Wide														dp0 Quattro										
Compact (Prime lens)	Wide							DP1		DP1s	DP1x		DP1 Merrill		dp1 Quattro										
Compact (Prime lens)	Normal								DP2	DP2s	DP2x		DP2 Merrill	dp2 Quattro											
Compact (Prime lens)	Tele												DP3 Merrill	dp3 Quattro											
DSLR	APS-C	SD9		SD10				SD14		SD15		SD1	SD1 Merrill												
