= Panasonic Lumix DMC-LX100 =

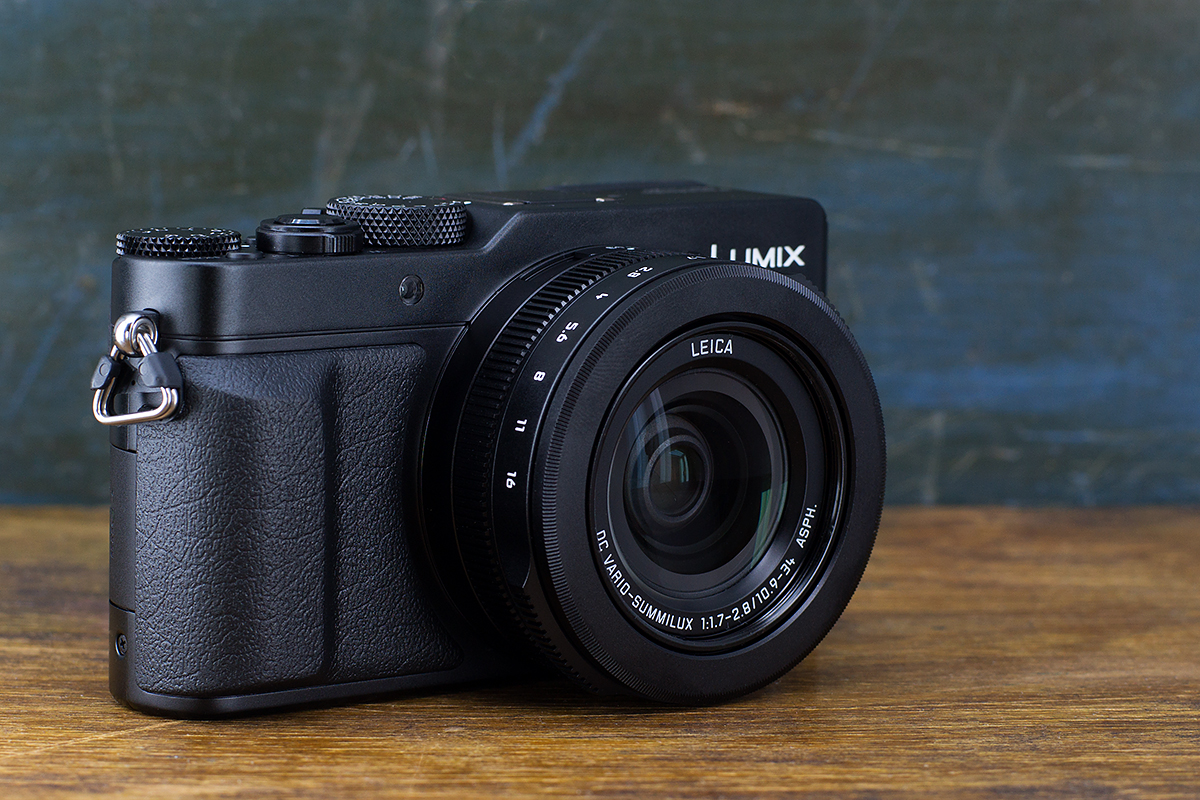

Overview
- Maker: Panasonic
- Type: Large sensor fixed-lens camera
- Released: September 15, 2014
- Intro price: $900

Lens
- Lens: 24-75mm equivalent
- F-numbers: f/1.7-f/2.8 at the widest

Sensor/medium
- Sensor type: CMOS sensor
- Sensor size: 17.3 x 13mm (Four Thirds type)
- Maximum resolution: 4112 x 3088 (13 megapixels)
- Film speed: 200-25600 (and 100 in expanded ISO)
- Recording medium: SD, SDHC, or SDXC (UHS-I supported)

Focusing
- Focus areas: 49 focus points

Shutter
- Frame rate: 24p, 25p (PAL); 24p, 25p, 30p (NTSC)
- Shutter speeds: 1/16000s to 60s
- Continuous shooting: 11 frames per second

Viewfinder
- Viewfinder magnification: 1.39
- Frame coverage: 100%

Image processing
- Image processor: Venus Engine
- White balance: Yes

General
- Video recording: 2160p at 30fps, 1080p at 60fps
- LCD screen: 3 inches with 921,000 dots
- Battery: 7.2V, 1025 mAh, 7.4 Wh
- Dimensions: 115 x 66 x 55mm (4.53 x 2.6 x 2.17 inches)
- Weight: 393 g (14 oz) including battery

The Panasonic Lumix DMC-LX100 is a compact camera with a 13 MP Four Thirds type 17.3mm x 13mm sensor announced by Panasonic on September 15, 2014. LX100 features an F1.7-2.8 24-75mm equivalent Leica-branded lens, 2764k dot Electronic viewfinder, 3" 921k dot LCD, built-in wireless and it can record 4K (Ultra HD) video at 30p or Full HD at 60p.

== Leica D-Lux (Typ 109) ==
The Leica D-Lux (Typ 109) is based on and nearly identical to the LX100 with differences only in exterior design elements, warranty, bundled software, and price.

== Panasonic Lumix DC-LX100 II ==
On August 22, 2018, Panasonic announced an updated version of the LX100 called the Lumix DC-LX100 II, which increases the maximum image resolution to 17 megapixels and the screen resolution to 1.24 million dots, while adding touch sensitivity.

== Leica D-Lux 7 ==
The Leica D-Lux 7 is based on and nearly identical to the LX100 II with differences only in exterior design elements, warranty, bundled software, and price.

== See also ==
- List of large sensor fixed-lens cameras
- List of retro-style digital cameras
