= Leica X1 =

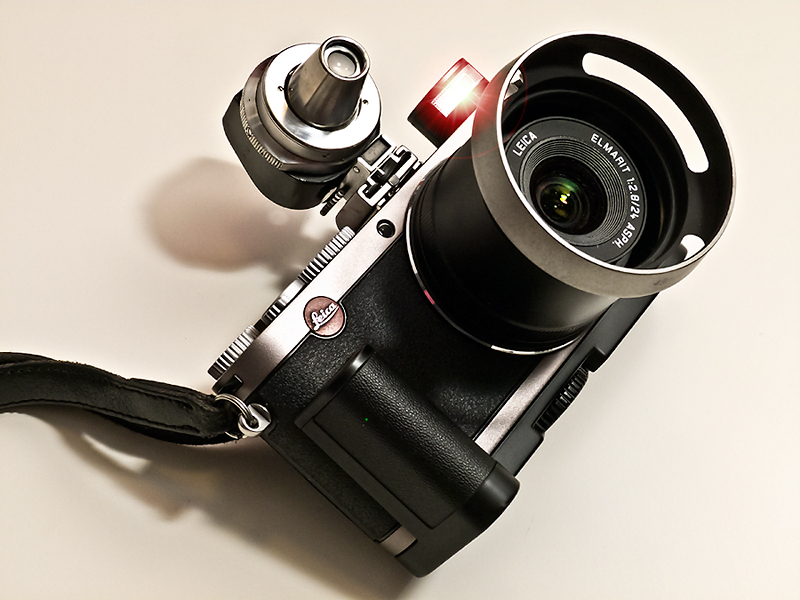

Overview
- Maker: Leica
- Type: Large sensor fixed-lens camera
- Released: 2009/9/9

Lens
- Lens: Leica Elmarit 24 mm f/2.8 (35 mm equivalent)

Sensor/medium
- Sensor type: CMOS
- Sensor size: 23.6 x 15.7 mm (APS-C type)
- Maximum resolution: 4272 x 2586 (12 megapixels)
- Film speed: 100-3200
- Recording medium: SD or SDHC card

Focusing
- Focus areas: 11 focus points

Shutter
- Shutter speeds: 1/2000s to 30s
- Continuous shooting: 3 frames per second

Image processing
- White balance: Yes

General
- LCD screen: 2.7 inches with 230,000 pixels
- Body features: All-metal body, high-grip leather trim
- Dimensions: 123.2 x 63.5 x 50.3 mm (4.85 x 2.50 x 1.98 inches)
- Weight: 306 g (11 oz) including battery

Leica X1 is a compact fixed-lens, large-sensor digital camera by Leica. The pre-production model was released to reviewers in September 2009.

Leica X1 uses an APS-C (23.6 mm × 15.8 mm) format CMOS sensor with 12.2 megapixels (4272 × 2856 pixels, 3:2 aspect ratio). Fixed 24 mm/2.8 prime lens, equivalent to 36 mm focal length for a 35 mm camera, contains 8 elements in 6 groups. The lens extends to working position on power-up and retracts on power-down.

The camera is retro-styled, mimicking Leica rangefinder cameras of the past and the digital Leica M9, in a substantially smaller package sized 60 mm × 124 mm × 32 mm and weighing approximately 315 grams (11.1 oz) with battery. It is equipped with a flash hot shoe and a manually operated built-in flash, although the latter has guide number of only 5, considerably smaller than that of built-in flashes of entry-level DSLRs.

Image stabilization is neither lens-based nor sensor-based, but relies on a unique method Leica developed for this camera – combining two images into one.

The Leica X1's image stabilization (combining two images into one) has the effect of improving the percentage of acceptably sharp images when taken handheld in low light at shutter speeds of 1/30 second, or slightly less if a very steady hand is used. On the other hand, those "acceptably sharp" images will show a slight blur when viewed at 100 percent, as compared to sharp images taken with the image stabilization turned off. This very slight blur is due to the unavoidable small movement of the camera as it takes the two images it needs to combine for image stabilization purposes.

As of July 13, 2010, the Leica X1 was the first compact camera to be approved by Getty Images for submissions to their image library, and remained the only compact camera ever on that list, as on April 27, 2011, Getty published a revised wording of its technical requirements that no longer dictated what cameras could be used.

== See also ==
- List of large sensor fixed-lens cameras
- List of retro-style digital cameras
