= Leica X2 =

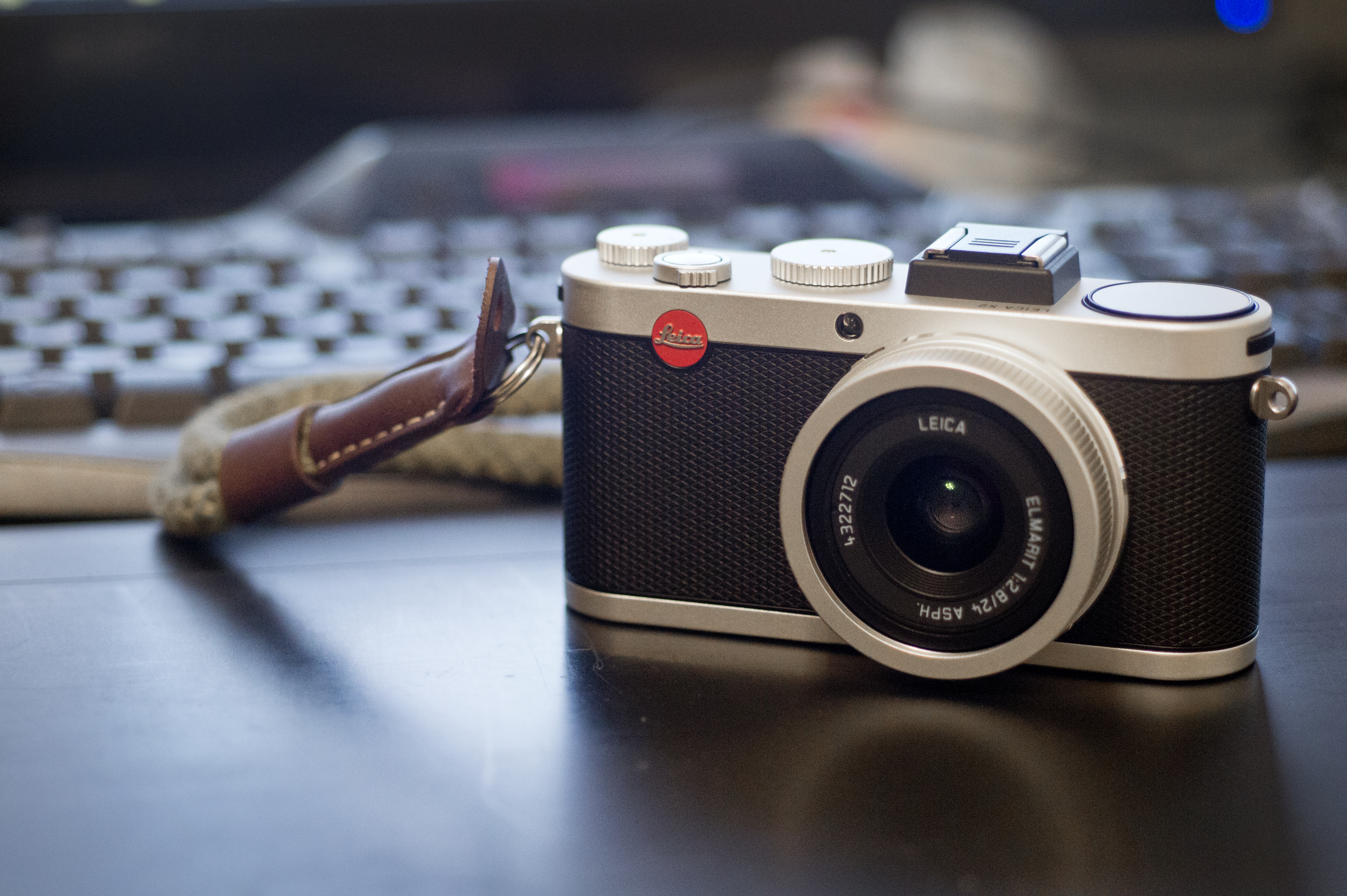

Overview
- Maker: Leica
- Type: Large sensor fixed-lens camera

Lens
- Lens: 36mm equivalent
- F-numbers: f/2.8 at the widest

Sensor/medium
- Sensor type: CMOS
- Sensor size: 23.6 x 15.8mm (APS-C type)
- Maximum resolution: 4928 x 3264 (16 megapixels)
- Film speed: 100-12500
- Recording medium: SD or SDHC card

Focusing
- Focus areas: 11 focus points

Shutter
- Shutter speeds: 1/2000s to 30s
- Continuous shooting: 5 frames per second

Image processing
- White balance: Yes

General
- LCD screen: 2.7 inches with 230,000 dots
- Body features: All-metal body, high-grip leather trim
- Dimensions: 124 x 69 x 52mm (4.88 x 2.72 x 2.05 inches)
- Weight: 345 g (12 oz) including battery

The Leica X2 is a digital large sensor compact camera announced by Leica Camera on 10 May 2012. It is the successor of the Leica X1, and improves on the earlier model with a higher resolution sensor, improved autofocus and an optionally available electronic viewfinder for easier use in bright light.

On 16 September 2014, the Leica X-E was announced, which is identical to the X2 except the exterior colour.

== See also ==
- List of large sensor fixed-lens cameras
- List of retro-style digital cameras
