= Sony Cyber-shot DSC-RX1 =

Sony DSC-RX1
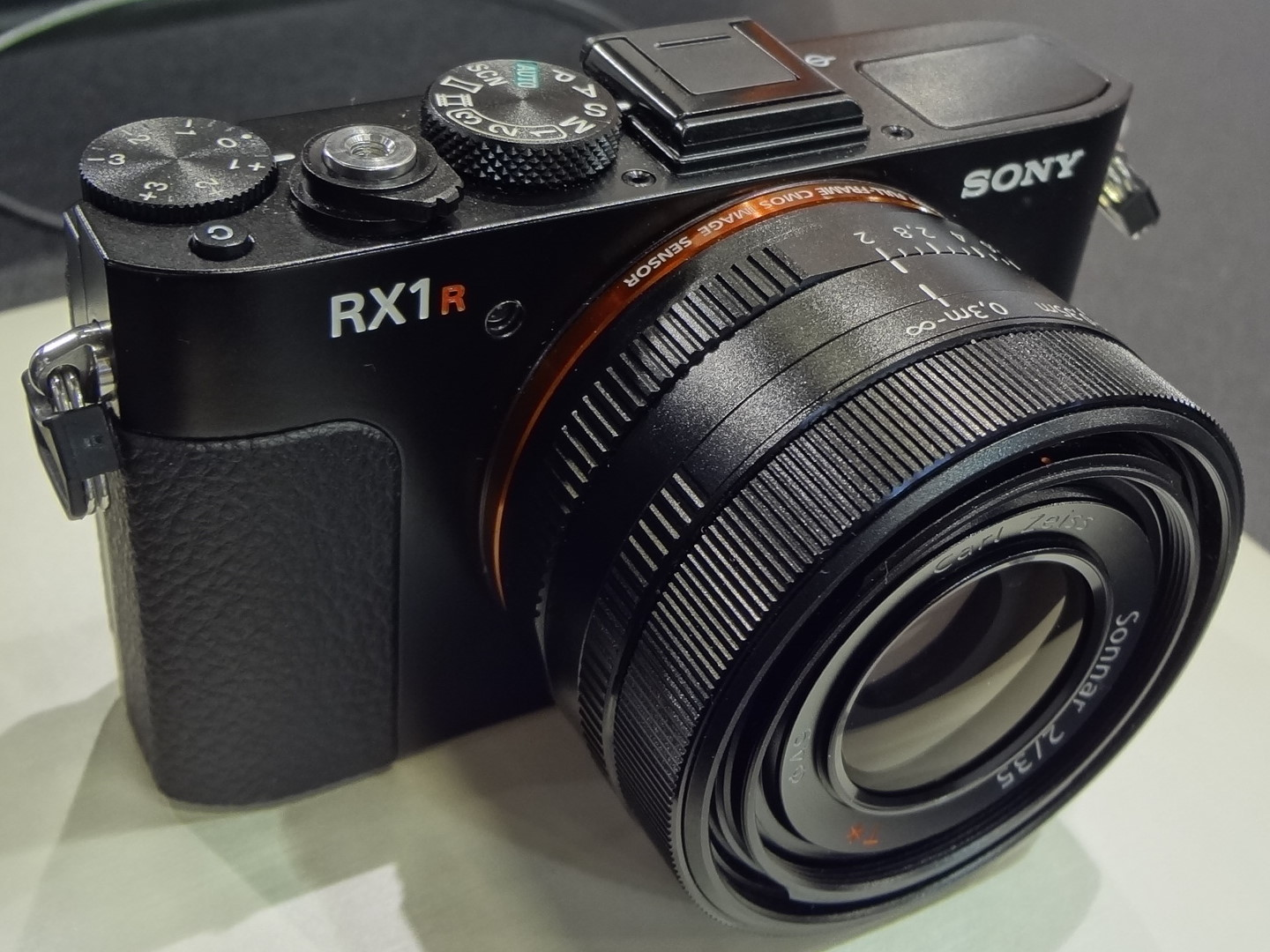
- Sony DSC-RX1 with built-in Zeiss Lens.

Overview
- Maker: Sony
- Type: Large sensor fixed-lens camera
- Released: Sept 12 2012

Lens
- Lens mount: Fixed
- Lens: 35mm
- F-numbers: f/2.0 - f/22.0

Sensor/medium
- Sensor type: CMOS
- Sensor size: 35.8 x 23.8mm (Full Frame)
- Sensor maker: Sony
- Maximum resolution: 6000 x 4000 (24 megapixels)
- Film speed: Auto, 100, 200, 400, 800, 1600, 3200, 6400, 12800, 25600
- Recording medium: SD/SDHC/SDXC/Memory Stick Duo/Pro Duo/Pro-HG Duo

Focusing
- Focus modes: Contrast detect (sensor), Multi-area, Centre, Selective single point, Tracking, Single, Face Detection
- Focus areas: 25

Flash
- Flash exposure compensation: yes

Shutter
- Shutter speeds: 1/4000s to 30s (Bulb mode available in Manual Mode)
- Continuous shooting: 5 frames per second

Image processing
- White balance: Yes
- WB bracketing: No

General
- LCD screen: 3 inches with 1,229,000 dots
- Battery: NP-BX1
- Dimensions: 113 x 65 x 70mm (4.45 x 2.56 x 2.76 inches)
- Weight: 482 g (17 oz) including battery
- Made in: Japan

The Sony Cyber-shot DSC-RX1 is a series of premium fixed-lens full-frame digital compact cameras made by Sony as part of its Cyber-shot line.

The DSC-RX1 was announced in September 2012. The DSC-RX1R, released in 2013, is a variant of the Sony DSC-RX1 without anti-aliasing filter in front of the image sensor. In 2015, both models were succeeded by the DSC-RX1R II.

== Cyber-shot DSC-RX1 ==
The DSC-RX1 was the world's first fixed-lens, full-frame digital compact camera, and as of its announcement, was the world's smallest full-frame digital camera but is also considerably more expensive than most other compact cameras. It was announced in September 2012.

=== Notable features ===
The DSC-RX1 features a 35 mm f/2 Zeiss Sonnar lens with leaf shutter capable of a minimum shutter speed of 1/2000 s (for apertures 2.0 to 4.0), 1/3200 s (for apertures down to 5.6), and even 1/4000 s (for smaller apertures down to 22). The camera is equipped with a 24.3-megapixel full-frame CMOS sensor, and it includes a new Multi Interface Shoe that is physically compatible with the ISO 518 standard hot shoe, with electrical contacts for newer Sony shoe-mounted accessories as well as compatibility with the proprietary iISO flash shoe via the ADP-MAA adapter.

=== DxO Mark ===
Based on DxOMark Sensor Scores (performance), the Sony DSC-RX1 got the best overall score among high-end compact cameras and mirror-less cameras tested with 93 scored, and even the Sony DSC-RX1's overall score is just behind the full-frame DSLR of Nikon D800, Nikon D800E and Nikon D600, with 96 and 94 respectively.

== Cyber-shot DSC-RX1R ==
The Sony Cyber-shot DSC-RX1R, released in 2013, is a variant of the Sony DSC-RX1 without anti-aliasing filter in front of the image sensor. This can slightly increase the effective resolution at the expense of possibly more moiré in areas with fine repeating textures.

== Cyber-shot DSC-RX1R II ==
Sony Cyber-shot DSC-RX1R II
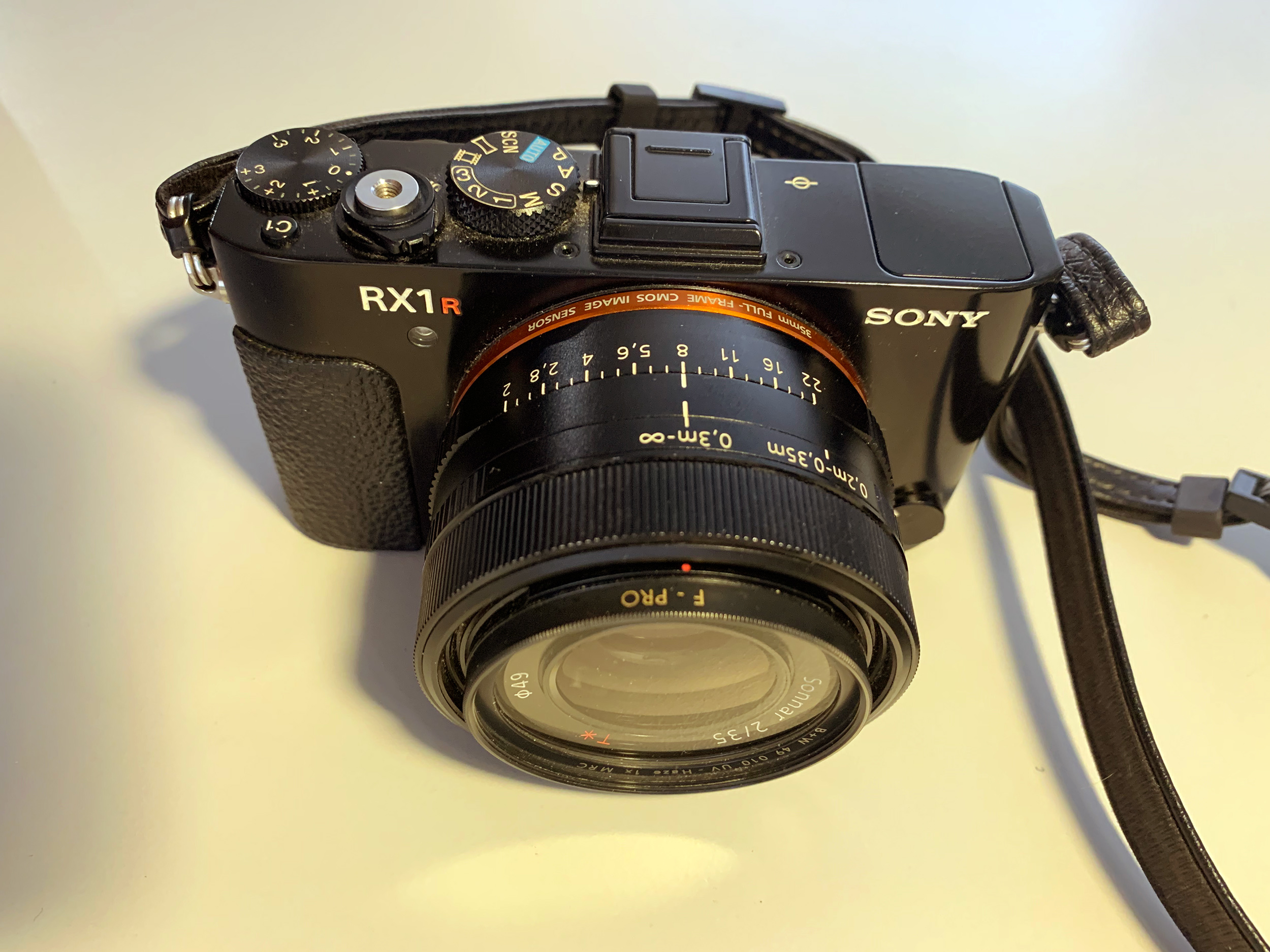
- RX1R II with a 35 mm lens and Ø49 filter

Overview
- Maker: Sony
- Type: Compact
- Intro price: $3200

Lens
- Lens: 35 mm
- F-numbers: f/2.0 at the widest

Sensor/medium
- Sensor type: BSI-CMOS
- Sensor size: 35.9 x 24 mm (full frame)
- Sensor maker: Sony
- Maximum resolution: 7952 x 5304 (42 megapixels)
- Film speed: 50–102400
- Recording medium: SD, SDHC or SDXC memory card, Memory Stick Pro Duo

Focusing
- Focus areas: Hybrid autofocus system with 399 phase detect and 25 cross type contrast detect focus points

Shutter
- Shutter speeds: 1/4000 to 30s
- Continuous shooting: 5 frames/second

Viewfinder
- Viewfinder magnification: 0.74
- Frame coverage: 100%

Image processing
- Image processor: BIONZ X
- White balance: Yes

General
- LCD screen: 3 inches with 1,228,800 dots
- Dimensions: 113 x 65 x 72 mm (4.45 x 2.56 x 2.83 inches)
- Weight: 507 g (18 oz) including battery

The DSC-RX1R II was announced by Sony on October 14, 2015.

It is the first camera in mass production featuring a continuously variable optical low-pass filter. In contrast with conceptually related technology debuted in the Pentax K-3 and subsequently carried by other Pentax models, Sony's technology works at any shutter speed.

== See also ==
- List of large sensor fixed-lens cameras
