= List of cameras supporting a raw format =

== Still cameras ==
The following digital cameras allow photos to be taken and saved in at least one raw image format. Some cameras support more than one, usually a proprietary format and Digital Negative (DNG).

=== Agfa ===
- Agfa ActionCam - MDC

=== Canon ===
Name	Alternative Name 1	Alternative Name 2	Comments
Canon EOS-1D			
Canon EOS-1D Mark II			
Canon EOS-1D Mark III			
Canon EOS-1D Mark IV			
Canon EOS-1Ds			
Canon EOS-1Ds Mark II			
Canon EOS-1Ds Mark III			
Canon EOS-1D X			
Canon EOS 5D			
Canon EOS 5D Mark II			
Canon EOS 5D Mark III			
Canon EOS 5D Mark IV			
Canon EOS 6D			
Canon EOS 6D Mark II			
Canon EOS 7D			
Canon EOS 7D Mark II			
Canon EOS 10D			
Canon EOS 20D			
Canon EOS 30D			
Canon EOS 40D			
Canon EOS 50D			
Canon EOS 60D			
Canon EOS 70D			
Canon EOS 77D	EOS 9000D		
Canon EOS 80D			
Canon EOS D30			
Canon EOS D60			
Canon EOS 300D	EOS Kiss Digital	EOS Digital Rebel	
Canon EOS 350D	EOS Kiss Digital N	EOS Digital Rebel XT	
Canon EOS 400D	EOS Kiss Digital X	EOS Digital Rebel XTi	
Canon EOS 450D	EOS Kiss X2	EOS Digital Rebel XSi	
Canon EOS 500D	EOS Kiss X3	EOS Rebel T1i	
Canon EOS 550D	EOS Kiss X4	EOS Rebel T2i	
Canon EOS 600D	EOS Kiss X5	EOS Rebel T3i	
Canon EOS 650D	EOS Kiss X6i (Japan)	EOS Rebel T4i (America)	
Canon EOS 700D	EOS Kiss X7i (Japan)	EOS Rebel T5i (America)	
Canon EOS 100D	EOS Kiss X7 (Japan)	EOS Rebel SL1 (America)	
Canon EOS 200D	EOS Kiss X9	EOS Rebel SL2	
Canon EOS 750D	EOS Kiss X8i	EOS Rebel T6i	
Canon EOS 760D	EOS 8000D	EOS Rebel T6s	
Canon EOS 800D	EOS Kiss X9i	EOS Rebel T7i	
Canon EOS 1000D	EOS Kiss Digital F	EOS Digital Rebel XS	
Canon EOS 1100D	EOS Kiss X50	EOS Rebel T3	
Canon EOS 1200D	EOS Kiss X70	EOS Rebel T5	Canon EOS Hi
Canon EOS 1300D	EOS Kiss X80	EOS Rebel T6	
Canon EOS 2000D	EOS Kiss X90	EOS Rebel T7	EOS 1500D
Canon EOS 4000D		EOS Rebel T100	EOS 3000D
Canon EOS M			
Canon EOS M2			
Canon EOS M3			
Canon EOS M5			
Canon EOS M6			
Canon EOS M10			
Canon EOS M50			
Canon EOS M100			
Canon EOS R			
Canon PowerShot A450			using CHDK firmware
Canon PowerShot A460			using CHDK firmware
Canon PowerShot A470			using CHDK firmware
Canon PowerShot A480			using CHDK firmware
Canon PowerShot A530			using CHDK firmware
Canon PowerShot A540			using CHDK firmware
Canon PowerShot A550			using CHDK firmware
Canon PowerShot A560			using CHDK firmware
Canon PowerShot A570 IS			using CHDK firmware
Canon PowerShot A590 IS			using CHDK firmware
Canon PowerShot A610			using CHDK firmware
Canon PowerShot A620			using CHDK firmware
Canon PowerShot A630			using CHDK firmware
Canon PowerShot A640			using CHDK firmware
Canon PowerShot A650 IS			using CHDK firmware
Canon PowerShot A700			using CHDK firmware
Canon PowerShot A710 IS			using CHDK firmware
Canon PowerShot A720 IS			using CHDK firmware
Canon PowerShot A1100 IS			using CHDK firmware
Canon PowerShot A2000 IS		Canon Powershot A4000 IS	using CHDK firmware
Canon PowerShot G1			
Canon PowerShot G2			
Canon PowerShot G3			
Canon PowerShot G5			
Canon PowerShot G6			
Canon PowerShot G7			using CHDK firmware
Canon PowerShot G9			
Canon PowerShot G10			
Canon PowerShot G11			native or using CHDK firmware
Canon PowerShot G12			
Canon PowerShot G15			
Canon PowerShot G16			
Canon PowerShot G1 X			
Canon PowerShot G1 X Mark II			
Canon PowerShot G3 X			
Canon PowerShot G7 X			
Canon PowerShot G9 X			
Canon PowerShot Pro1			
Canon PowerShot Pro90 IS			
Canon PowerShot S2 IS			using CHDK firmware
Canon PowerShot S3 IS			using CHDK firmware
Canon PowerShot S5 IS			using CHDK firmware
Canon PowerShot S30			
Canon PowerShot S60			
Canon PowerShot S70			
Canon PowerShot S90			native or using CHDK firmware
Canon PowerShot S95			
Canon PowerShot S100			
Canon PowerShot S110			
Canon PowerShot S120			
Canon PowerShot SD30	Digital IXUS iZoom	IXY Digital L^{3}	using CHDK firmware
Canon PowerShot SD300	Digital IXUS 40	IXY Digital 50	using CHDK firmware
Canon PowerShot SD400	Digital IXUS 50	IXY Digital 55	using CHDK firmware
Canon PowerShot SD450	Digital IXUS 55	IXY Digital 60	using CHDK firmware
Canon PowerShot SD500	Digital IXUS 700	IXY Digital 600	using CHDK firmware
Canon PowerShot SD550	Digital IXUS 750	IXY Digital 700	using CHDK firmware
Canon PowerShot SD600	Digital IXUS 60	IXY Digital 70	using CHDK firmware
Canon PowerShot SD630	Digital IXUS 65	IXY Digital 80	using CHDK firmware
Canon PowerShot SD700 IS	Digital IXUS 800 IS	IXY Digital 800 IS	using CHDK firmware
Canon PowerShot SD750	Digital IXUS 75	IXY Digital 90	using CHDK firmware
Canon PowerShot SD780 IS	Digital IXUS 100 IS	IXY Digital 210 IS	using CHDK firmware
Canon PowerShot SD790 IS	Digital IXUS 90 IS	IXY Digital 95 IS	using CHDK firmware
Canon PowerShot SD800 IS	Digital IXUS 850 IS	IXY Digital 900 IS	using CHDK firmware
Canon PowerShot SD850 IS	Digital IXUS 950 IS	IXY Digital 810 IS	using CHDK firmware
Canon PowerShot SD870 IS	Digital IXUS 860 IS	IXY Digital 910 IS	using CHDK firmware
Canon PowerShot SD880 IS	Digital IXUS 870 IS	IXY Digital 920 IS	using CHDK firmware
Canon PowerShot SD890 IS	Digital IXUS 970 IS	IXY Digital 820 IS	using CHDK firmware
Canon PowerShot SD950 IS	Digital IXUS 960 IS	IXY Digital 2000 IS	using CHDK firmware
Canon PowerShot SD990 IS	Digital IXUS 980 IS	IXY Digital 3000 IS	using CHDK firmware
Canon PowerShot SD1000	Digital IXUS 70	IXY Digital 10	using CHDK firmware
Canon PowerShot SD1100 IS	Digital IXUS 80 IS	IXY Digital 20 IS	using CHDK firmware
Canon PowerShot SX 1 IS			as of Firmware ver. 2.0.0.0 2009-03-02, or CHDK
Canon PowerShot SX10 IS			using CHDK firmware
Canon PowerShot SX20 IS			using CHDK firmware
Canon PowerShot SX50 HS			(Superzoom, released 2012)
Canon PowerShot SX100 IS			using CHDK firmware
Canon PowerShot SX110 IS			using CHDK firmware
Canon PowerShot SX130 IS			using CHDK firmware
Canon PowerShot SX200 IS			using CHDK firmware
Canon PowerShot TX1			using CHDK firmware

=== Casio ===
- Exilim EX-ZR700
- Exilim EX-ZR1000
- Exilim EX-100

=== Fujifilm ===
- Fujifilm FinePix IS-Pro
- Fujifilm FinePix S1 Pro
- Fujifilm FinePix S2 Pro
- Fujifilm FinePix S3 Pro
- Fujifilm FinePix S5 Pro
- Fujifilm FinePix S6500fd
- Fujifilm FinePix S9100/9600
- Fujifilm FinePix S9000/9500
- Fujifilm FinePix 20 Pro
- Fujifilm FinePix F700
- Fujifilm FinePix F710
- Fujifilm FinePix E550
- Fujifilm FinePix E900
- Fujifilm FinePix F550EXR
- Fujifilm FinePix F600EXR
- Fujifilm FinePix F810
- Fujifilm FinePix HS10
- Fujifilm FinePix HS20EXR
- Fujifilm FinePix HS35EXR
- Fujifilm FinePix HS30EXR
- Fujifilm FinePix S100FS
- Fujifilm FinePix S200EXR
- Fujifilm FinePix S5100/5500
- Fujifilm FinePix S5200/5600
- Fujifilm FinePix S7000
- Fujifilm FinePix HS50EXR
- Fujifilm FinePix X10
- Fujifilm X100 (X100, X100S, X100T)
- Fujifilm FinePix X-S1
- Fujifilm X-Pro1
- Fujifilm X-E1
- Fujifilm X-E2
- Fujifilm X-E2s
- Fujifilm X-E3
- Fujifilm X-E4
- Fujifilm X-M1
- Fujifilm X-A1
- Fujifilm X-A2
- Fujifilm X-T1
- Fujifilm X-T10
- Fujifilm X-Pro2
- Fujifilm X-Pro3
- Fujifilm X-T2
- Fujifilm X-T20
- Fujifilm X-T3
- Fujifilm X-T30
- Fujifilm X-T4
- Fujifilm X100F
- Fujifilm X100V
- Fujifilm X-H1
- Fujifilm X-T100
- Fujifilm XQ1

=== Imacon ===
- Imacon Ixpress

=== Hasselblad ===
- Hasselblad H series
- Hasselblad CF series
- Hasselblad CFV series
- Hasselblad Lunar / Hasselblad Lunar Limited Edition - ARW 2.3.0 (CMOS, compressed)
- Hasselblad Stellar / Hasselblad Stellar Special Edition - ARW 2.3.0 (CMOS, compressed)
- Hasselblad Stellar II - ARW 2.3.1 (CMOS, compressed)
- Hasselblad HV - ARW 2.3.1 (CMOS, compressed)
- Hasselblad Lusso - ARW 2.3.1 (lossy delta-compression)

=== Kodak ===
- Kodak P712
- Kodak P850
- Kodak P880 saved in .KDC format
- Kodak C603/C643 via hidden debug menu
- Kodak C713 via hidden debug menu saved in .RAW format
- Kodak DCS-620, -660 Canon bodies, 2 and 6 megapixels
- Kodak DCS-720, -760 Nikon F5 bodies, 2 and 6 megapixels
- Kodak DCS-14n
- Kodak DCS Pro SLR/n
- Kodak DCS Pro SLR/c
- Kodak Z1015IS
- Kodak EasyShare Z980
- Kodak EasyShare Z990
- Kodak PixPro S1

=== Konica ===
The following cameras all have an undocumented raw image file mode, erroneously using the JPG file extension, convertible to MRW:

- Konica Digital Revio KD-400Z (MK77/2118)
- Konica Revio KD-410Z (MK12)
- Konica Revio KD-420Z (ML42)
- Konica Digital Revio KD-500Z (MK86)
- Konica Revio KD-510Z (ML22)

=== Konica Minolta ===
- Konica Minolta DiMAGE A2 (2720) - MRW
- Konica Minolta DiMAGE A200 (2747) - MRW
- Konica Minolta Dynax 5D / Konica Minolta Maxxum 5D / Konica Minolta α-5 Digital / Konica Minolta α Sweet Digital (2186) - MRW
- Konica Minolta Dynax 7D / Konica Minolta Maxxum 7D / Konica Minolta α-7 Digital (2181) - MRW
- Konica Minolta DiMAGE G530 (2736) - undocumented raw image file mode, erroneously using the JPG file extension, convertible to MRW
- Konica Minolta DiMAGE G600 (2744) - undocumented raw image file mode, erroneously using the JPG file extension, convertible to MRW
- Konica Minolta DiMAGE Z2 (2725, SX745) - unofficial hack to enable raw image file mode, using the JPG file extension, convertible to NEF

=== Kyocera ===
- Contax N Digital

=== Leaf ===
- Leaf Digital Backs

=== Leica ===
- Leica M8
- Leica M8.2
- Leica M9
- Leica Digilux 2
- Leica Digilux 3
- Leica V-LUX 1
- Leica D-LUX 3
- Leica D-LUX 4
- Leica D-LUX 5
- Leica Digital Modul-R
- Leica X1
- Leica X2
- Leica X Vario

=== Minolta ===
- Minolta RD-175 (2753) - MDC
- Minolta DiMAGE 5 (2773) - MRW
- Minolta DiMAGE 7 (2766) / Minolta DiMAGE 7UG - MRW
- Minolta DiMAGE 7i (2779) - MRW
- Minolta DiMAGE 7Hi (2778) - MRW
- Minolta DiMAGE A1 (2782) - MRW
- Minolta DiMAGE G400 (2732) - undocumented raw image file mode, erroneously using the JPG file extension, convertible to MRW
- Minolta DiMAGE G500 (2731) - undocumented raw image file mode, erroneously using the JPG file extension, convertible to MRW

=== Nikon ===
==== Nikon Mirrorless Z-series ====
- Nikon Z9
- Nikon Z8
- Nikon Zf
- Nikon Z7II
- Nikon Z7
- Nikon Z6II
- Nikon Z6
- Nikon Z5
- Nikon Z5II
- Nikon Z5IIC
- Nikon Zfc
- Nikon Z50
- Nikon Z50II
- Nikon Z30
- Nikon ZR

==== Nikon DSLR series ====
- Nikon D1
- Nikon D1H
- Nikon D1X
- Nikon D2H
- Nikon D2Hs
- Nikon D2X
- Nikon D2Xs
- Nikon D3
- Nikon D3S
- Nikon D3X
- Nikon D4
- Nikon D4S
- Nikon D40
- Nikon D40x
- Nikon D50
- Nikon D60
- Nikon D70/D70s
- Nikon D80
- Nikon D90
- Nikon D100
- Nikon D200
- Nikon D300
- Nikon D300s
- Nikon D500
- Nikon D600
- Nikon D610
- Nikon D700
- Nikon D750
- Nikon D800
- Nikon D800E
- Nikon D810
- Nikon D810A
- Nikon D850
- Nikon D3000
- Nikon D3100
- Nikon D3200
- Nikon D3300
- Nikon D5000
- Nikon D5100
- Nikon D5200
- Nikon D5300
- Nikon D5500
- Nikon D5600
- Nikon D7000
- Nikon D7100
- Nikon D7200
- Nikon D7500

==== Nikon MILC 1 series ====
- Nikon 1 J1, September 21, 2011
- Nikon 1 V1, September 21, 2011
- Nikon 1 J2, August 10, 2012
- Nikon 1 V2, October 24, 2012
- Nikon 1 J3
- Nikon 1 V3
- Nikon 1 J4
- Nikon 1 J5
- Nikon 1 S1
- Nikon 1 S2
- Nikon 1 AW1

==== Nikon Coolpix series with at least 10 megapixels ====
- Nikon Coolpix A
- Nikon Coolpix P6000
- Nikon Coolpix P7000
- Nikon Coolpix P7100
- Nikon Coolpix P7700
- Nikon Coolpix P7800
- Nikon Coolpix P330
- Nikon Coolpix P340
- Nikon Coolpix P1000
- Nikon Coolpix B700

==== Nikon Coolpix series below 10 megapixels ====
- Nikon Coolpix 700 ("DIAG RAW" hack)
- Nikon Coolpix 800 ("DIAG RAW" hack)
- Nikon Coolpix 880 ("DIAG RAW" hack)
- Nikon Coolpix 900 ("DIAG RAW" hack)
- Nikon Coolpix 950 ("DIAG RAW" hack)
- Nikon Coolpix 990 ("DIAG RAW" hack)
- Nikon Coolpix 995 ("DIAG RAW" hack)
- Nikon Coolpix 2100 ("DIAG RAW" hack)
- Nikon Coolpix 2500 ("DIAG RAW" hack)
- Nikon Coolpix 3200 ("DIAG RAW" hack)
- Nikon Coolpix 3700 ("DIAG RAW" hack)
- Nikon Coolpix 4300 ("DIAG RAW" hack)
- Nikon Coolpix 4500 ("DIAG RAW" hack)
- Nikon Coolpix 5000 (as of Firmware ver. 1.7 12/18/03)
- Nikon Coolpix 5400
- Nikon Coolpix 5700
- Nikon Coolpix 8400
- Nikon Coolpix 8700
- Nikon Coolpix 8800
- Nikon Coolpix S6 ("DIAG RAW" hack)

=== Olympus ===
- Olympus C-5050Z
- Olympus C-5060WZ
- Olympus C-8080WZ
- Olympus C-7000
- Olympus E-1
- Olympus E-3
- Olympus E-5
- Olympus E-10
- Olympus E-20
- Olympus E-30
- Olympus E-300
- Olympus E-330
- Olympus E-400
- Olympus E-410
- Olympus E-420
- Olympus E-450
- Olympus E-500
- Olympus E-510
- Olympus E-520
- Olympus E-600
- Olympus E-620
- Olympus OM-D E-M1
- Olympus OM-D E-M1 Mark II
- Olympus OM-D E-M1 Mark III
- Olympus OM-D E-M1X
- Olympus OM-D E-M5
- Olympus OM-D E-M5 Mark II
- Olympus OM-D E-M5 Mark III
- Olympus OM-D E-M10
- Olympus OM-D E-M10 Mark II
- Olympus OM-D E-M10 Mark III
- Olympus OM-D E-M10 Mark IV
- Olympus PEN E-P1
- Olympus PEN E-P2
- Olympus PEN E-P3
- Olympus PEN E-P5
- Olympus PEN E-PL1
- Olympus PEN E-PL2
- Olympus PEN E-PL3
- Olympus PEN E-PL5
- Olympus PEN E-PM1
- Olympus PEN E-PM2
- Olympus SP-320
- Olympus SP-350
- Olympus SP-510 UZ
- Olympus SP-550 UZ
- Olympus SP-570 UZ
- Olympus Stylus 1
- Olympus Stylus 1S
- Olympus Tough TG-4
- Olympus Tough TG-5
- Olympus Tough TG-6
- Olympus XZ-1
- Olympus XZ-2
- Olympus XZ-10

=== Panasonic ===
- Panasonic Lumix DMC-FX150
- Panasonic Lumix DMC-FZ8
- Panasonic Lumix DMC-FZ18
- Panasonic Lumix DMC-FZ28
- Panasonic Lumix DMC-FZ30
- Panasonic Lumix DMC-FZ35
- Panasonic Lumix DMC-FZ38
- Panasonic Lumix DMC-FZ40
- Panasonic Lumix DMC-FZ50
- Panasonic Lumix DMC-FZ72
- Panasonic Lumix DMC-FZ100
- Panasonic Lumix DMC-FZ150
- Panasonic Lumix DMC-FZ200 (Superzoom, released 2012)
- Panasonic Lumix DMC-FZ300
- Panasonic Lumix DMC-FZ1000
- Panasonic Lumix DMC-GM1
- Panasonic Lumix DMC-GM5
- Panasonic Lumix DMC-G1
- Panasonic Lumix DMC-G2
- Panasonic Lumix DMC-G3
- Panasonic Lumix DMC-G5
- Panasonic Lumix DMC-G6
- Panasonic Lumix DMC-G7
- Panasonic Lumix DMC-GF1
- Panasonic Lumix DMC-GF2
- Panasonic Lumix DMC-GF3
- Panasonic Lumix DMC-GX1
- Panasonic Lumix DMC-GX7
- Panasonic Lumix DMC-GX8
- Panasonic Lumix DMC-GX85
- Panasonic Lumix DMC-GH1
- Panasonic Lumix DMC-GH2
- Panasonic Lumix DMC-GH3
- Panasonic Lumix DMC-GH4
- Panasonic Lumix DC-GH5
- Panasonic Lumix DC-GH5S
- Panasonic Lumix DMC-L1
- Panasonic Lumix DMC-L10
- Panasonic Lumix DMC-LC1
- Panasonic Lumix DMC-LX1
- Panasonic Lumix DMC-LX2
- Panasonic Lumix DMC-LX3
- Panasonic Lumix DMC-LX5
- Panasonic Lumix DMC-LX7
- Panasonic Lumix DMC-TZ60
- Panasonic Lumix DMC-TZ70
- Panasonic Lumix DMC-TZ80
- Panasonic Lumix DMC-TZ90
- Panasonic Lumix DMC-TZ100
- Panasonic Lumix DMC-TZ200

=== Pentax ===
- Pentax *ist D
- Pentax *ist DL
- Pentax *ist DL2
- Pentax *ist DS
- Pentax *ist DS2
- Pentax 645D IR - DNG and PEF
- Pentax 645D - DNG and PEF
- Pentax 645Z - DNG and PEF
- Pentax K-01 - DNG and PEF
- Pentax K100D Super
- Pentax K100D
- Pentax K10D - DNG and PEF
- Pentax K110D
- Pentax K2000/K-m
- Pentax K200D
- Pentax K20D - DNG and PEF
- Pentax K-1 - DNG and PEF
- Pentax K-1 II - DNG and PEF
- Pentax K-3 - DNG and PEF
- Pentax K-3 II - DNG and PEF
- Pentax K-3 III - DNG and PEF
- Pentax K-30 - DNG
- Pentax K-5 II - DNG and PEF
- Pentax K-5 IIs - DNG and PEF
- Pentax K-5 - DNG and PEF
- Pentax K-50 - DNG
- Pentax K-500 - DNG
- Pentax K-7 - DNG and PEF
- Pentax K-r - DNG and PEF
- Pentax K-S1
- Pentax K-S2
- Pentax K-x
- Pentax MX-1
- Pentax Q - DNG
- Pentax Q10 - DNG
- Pentax Q7 - DNG
- Pentax Q-S1 - DNG

=== Phase One ===
- All Phase One Digital Backs

=== Polaroid ===
- Polaroid x530 (Foveon x3f format; develop in Sigma Photo Pro)

=== Ricoh ===
- Ricoh Caplio GX100
- Ricoh GX200
- Ricoh GR
- Ricoh GR Digital
- Ricoh GR Digital II
- Ricoh GR Digital III
- Ricoh GR Digital IV

=== Samsung ===
- Samsung GX-10 - DNG
- Samsung GX-20 - DNG
- Samsung Pro815
- Samsung NX-M (Mini)
- Samsung NX1
- Samsung NX500
- Samsung NX1000
- Samsung NX100
- Samsung NX200
- Samsung NX300
- Samsung NX30
- Samsung NX20
- Samsung NX10
- Samsung WB5000
- Samsung EX1
- Samsung EX2F

=== Sigma ===
- Sigma DP1
- Sigma DP1s
- Sigma DP1x
- Sigma DP2
- Sigma DP2s
- Sigma DP2x
- Sigma FP
- Sigma SD9
- Sigma SD10
- Sigma SD14
- Sigma SD15
- Sigma SD1 Merrill
- Sigma DP1 Merrill
- Sigma DP2 Merrill
- Sigma DP3 Merrill
- Sigma DP0 Quattro
- Sigma DP1 Quattro
- Sigma DP2 Quattro
- Sigma DP3 Quattro
- Sigma SD Quattro
- Sigma SD Quattro H

=== Sony ===
- Sony DSLR-A100 - ARW 1.0 (lossless compression)
- Sony DSLR-A200 - ARW 2.0 (lossless compression)
- Sony DSLR-A230 - ARW 2.1 (lossless compression)
- Sony DSLR-A290 - ARW 2.1 (lossless compression)
- Sony DSLR-A300 - ARW 2.0 (lossless compression)
- Sony DSLR-A330 - ARW 2.1 (lossless compression)
- Sony DSLR-A350 - ARW 2.0 (lossless compression)
- Sony DSLR-A380 - ARW 2.1 (lossless compression)
- Sony DSLR-A390 - ARW 2.1 (lossless compression)
- Sony DSLR-A450 - ARW 2.1 (lossy delta-compression)
- Sony DSLR-A500 - ARW 2.1 (lossy delta-compression)
- Sony DSLR-A550 - ARW 2.1 (lossy delta-compression)
- Sony DSLR-A560 - ARW 2.2 (lossy delta-compression)
- Sony DSLR-A580 - ARW 2.2 (lossy delta-compression)
- Sony DSLR-A700 - ARW 2.0 (lossy delta-compression and 12-bit losslessly packed)
- Sony DSLR-A850 - ARW 2.1 (lossy delta-compression and 12-bit losslessly packed)
- Sony DSLR-A900 - ARW 2.1 (lossy delta-compression and 12-bit losslessly packed)
- Sony SLT-A33 - ARW 2.2 (lossy delta-compression)
- Sony SLT-A35 - ARW 2.2 (lossy delta-compression)
- Sony SLT-A37 - ARW 2.3.0 (lossy delta-compression)
- Sony SLT-A55 / Sony SLT-A55V - ARW 2.2 (lossy delta-compression)
- Sony SLT-A57 - ARW 2.3.0 (lossy delta-compression)
- Sony SLT-A58 - ARW 2.3.0 (lossy delta-compression)
- Sony SLT-A65 / Sony SLT-A65V - ARW 2.3.0 (lossy delta-compression)
- Sony SLT-A77 / Sony SLT-A77V - ARW 2.3.0 (lossy delta-compression)
- Sony SLT-A99 / Sony SLT-A99V - ARW 2.3.0/2.3.1 (lossy delta-compression)
- Sony ILCA-68 - ARW 2.3.1? (lossy delta-compression)
- Sony ILCA-77M2 - ARW 2.3.1 (lossy delta-compression)
- Sony ILCA-99M2 - ARW 2.3.2? (lossy delta-compression, 14-bit losslessy packed)
- Sony NEX-3 / Sony NEX-3C - ARW 2.1/2.2 (lossy delta-compression)
- Sony NEX-C3 - ARW 2.2 (lossy delta-compression)
- Sony NEX-F3 - ARW 2.3.0 (lossy delta-compression)
- Sony NEX-3N - ARW 2.3.0 (lossy delta-compression)
- Sony NEX-5 / Sony NEX-5C - ARW 2.1/2.2 (lossy delta-compression)
- Sony NEX-5N - ARW 2.2/2.3.0 (lossy delta-compression)
- Sony NEX-5R - ARW 2.3.0/2.3.1 (lossy delta-compression)
- Sony NEX-5T - ARW 2.3.1 (lossy delta-compression)
- Sony NEX-6 - ARW 2.3.0/2.3.1 (lossy delta-compression)
- Sony NEX-7 - ARW 2.3.0/2.3.1 (lossy delta-compression)
- Sony ILCE-3000 - ARW 2.3.1 (lossy delta-compression)
- Sony ILCE-3500 - ARW 2.3.1 (lossy delta-compression)
- Sony ILCE-5000 - ARW 2.3.1 (lossy delta-compression)
- Sony ILCE-5100 - ARW 2.3.1 (lossy delta-compression)
- Sony ILCE-6000 - ARW 2.3.1 (lossy delta-compression)
- Sony ILCE-6300 - ARW 2.3.2?
- Sony ILCE-7 - ARW 2.3.1 (lossy delta-compression)
- Sony ILCE-7R - ARW 2.3.1 (lossy delta-compression)
- Sony ILCE-7S - ARW 2.3.1 (lossy delta-compression)
- Sony ILCE-7M2 - ARW 2.3.1 (lossy delta-compression)
- Sony ILCE-7RM2 - ARW 2.3.1/2.3.2? (lossy delta-compression, optional 14-bit losslessy packed)
- Sony ILCE-7SM2 - ARW 2.3.2? (lossy delta-compression, 14-bit losslessy packed)
- Sony ILCE-QX1 - ARW 2.3.1 (lossy delta-compression)
- Sony Cyber-shot DSC-V3 - SRF
- Sony Cyber-shot DSC-F828 - SRF
- Sony Cyber-shot DSC-R1 - SR2
- Sony Cyber-shot DSC-RX1 / Sony Cyber-shot DSC-RX1R - ARW 2.3.0/2.3.1 (lossy delta-compression)
- Sony Cyber-shot DSC-RX10 - ARW 2.3.1 (lossy delta-compression)
- Sony Cyber-shot DSC-RX10M2 - ARW 2.3.? (lossy delta-compression)
- Sony Cyber-shot DSC-RX100 - ARW 2.3.0 (lossy delta-compression)
- Sony Cyber-shot DSC-RX100M2 - ARW 2.3.1 (lossy delta-compression)
- Sony Cyber-shot DSC-RX100M3 - ARW 2.3.1 (lossy delta-compression)
- Sony Cyber-shot DSC-RX100M4 - ARW 2.3.? (lossy delta-compression)
- Sony Handycam NEX-VG20 / Sony Handycam NEX-VG20E - ARW 2.3.0 (lossy delta-compression)
- Sony Handycam NEX-VG30 / Sony Handycam NEX-VG30E - ARW 2.3.0 (lossy delta-compression)
- Sony Handycam NEX-VG900 / Sony Handycam NEX-VG900E - ARW 2.3.0 (lossy delta-compression)
- Sony XCD-SX710CR - (8 bit/10 bit)
- Sony XCD-SX910CR - (8 bit/10 bit)

== Native in-camera raw video support ==
The following cameras allow audio and video to be shot in at least one raw (in the sense of a series of raw image format frames, such as in CineDNG) format. Lossy compression may be present. However, "raw" means the image data should not have gone through demosaicing and further processing, or at least the process should be reversible.

=== AJA ===
With AJA CamXChange software on OS-X Yosemite via Thunderbolt Port (DCI 4K to 30fps), CineDNG format. With AJA CamXChange (or possibly AJA Control Room – unconfirmed by owners) using AJA Io-4K in single- or dual-link 3G-SDI (DCI 4K up to 60fps), or AJA Kona4 PCIe card to Raid Array (DCI 4K up to 120fps), all in CineDNG format.

- AJA Cion

=== ARRI ===
With proprietary ArriRaw and HDMI or HD-SDI uncompressed video format.

- Arriflex D-20
- Arriflex D-21
- Arriflex Alexa (also known as Alexa Classic)
- Arri Alexa Plus
- Arri Alexa Studio
- Arri Alexa M (and Alexa XT M variant)
- Arri Alexa XT (other variants include Alexa XT Plus, Alexa XT Studio, Alexa SXT, Alexa SXT Plus, Alexa SXT Studio)
- Arri Alexa 65
- Arri Alexa Mini
- Arri Alexa LF
- Arri Alexa Mini LF
- Arri Alexa 35 (and Alexa 35 Xtreme variant)
- Arri Alexa 265

=== Z-Cam ===
- Z-Cam E2
- Z-Cam E2-M4
- Z-Cam E2-S6
- Z-Cam E2-F6
- Z-Cam E2-F8

=== Blackmagic Design ===
Blackmagic has its own raw video format, BRAW.

- Blackmagic Cinema Camera
- Blackmagic Production Camera 4K
- Blackmagic Pocket Cinema Camera
- Blackmagic Pocket Cinema Camera 4K
- Blackmagic Pocket Cinema Camera 6K (other variants include 6K Pro, 6K G2)
- Blackmagic Micro Cinema Camera (in sRAW reported as Lossy raw)
- Blackmagic Studio Camera (has variants such as 4K Plus, 4K Pro, 6K Pro)
- Blackmagic Micro Studio Camera 4K
- Blackmagic URSA
- Blackmagic URSA Broadcast
- Blackmagic URSA Mini (other variants include Mini 4.6K, Mini Pro 4.6K, Mini Pro 4.6K G2, Mini Pro 12K, Mini Pro 12K OLPF)
- Blackmagic Pyxis (has variants such as 6K, 12K)
- Blackmagic URSA CINE (has variants such as 12K, 17K)

=== Bolex ===
- Digital Bolex D16 and D16m Monochrome, with open format CinemaDNG video raw format.

=== Canon ===
- Cinema EOS C500, RAW 4K output.
- Cinema EOS C200, internal 4K RAW using the Cinema RAW Light Codec.

Unofficially, with the use of Magic Lantern software, the following EOS cameras can record RAW video in the software's MLV format:

- 5D Mark III
- 5D Mark II
- 7D
- 6D
- 70D
- 60D
- 50D
- 100D
- 700D
- 650D
- 600D
- 550D
- 500D
- 1200D
- EOS M

=== DALSA ===
- Dalsa Origin 1&2 - The company was acquired by Arriflex.

=== Ikonoskop ===
- A-Cam dII, with open format CinemaDNG.

=== Kinefinity ===
- KineRAW-S35, records in both CineForm and CinemaDNG.
- KineRAW-MINI, internally records CinemaDNG but can also externally output CineForm.
- KineMINI 4K, internally records lossless KineRAW (.krw) codec as well as CineForm.
- KineMAX 6K, internally records lossless KineRAW (.krw) codec as well as CineForm.
- TERRA 6K, internally records lossless KineRAW (.krw) codec.
- TERRA 4K, with firmware updated to KineOS 6.11 TERRA 4K can record with open format CinemaDNG.
- MAVO, reported to have both internal recording with the lossless KineRAW (.krw) codec as well as CinemaDNG.
- MAVO LF, reported to have both internal recording with the lossless KineRAW (.krw) codec as well as CinemaDNG.

=== Nikon ===
- Nikon ZR
- Nikon Z9
- Nikon Z8
- Nikon Z6 III

=== RED ===
Uses the proprietary REDCODE raw format with lossy compression for video. REDCODE performs a reversible demosaicing prior to compression.

- RED ONE
- RED Epic (has variants such as Epic-X, Epic-M, Epic Dragon, Epic-M Dragon)
- RED Scarlet (has variants such as Scarlet-X, Scarlet Dragon)
- RED Epic-W
- RED Scarlet-W
- RED Raven
- RED DSMC2 (available with different sensors)
- RED Ranger (available with different sensors)
- RED Komodo
- RED V-Raptor
- RED V-Raptor XL
- RED Komodo-X
- RED V-Raptor [X]
- RED V-Raptor XL [X]
- RED V-Raptor XE

=== Panasonic ===
- Varicam Pure

=== Sony ===
- Sony F65
- Sony F55 (with adapter)
- Sony F5 (with adapter)
- Sony NXCAM NEX-FS700 / Sony NXCAM NEX-FS700R, with firmware 3 plus AXS-R5 or HXR-IFR5 or Convergent Design Odyssey 7Q(+)
- Sony VENICE, with some resolutions requiring an AXS-R7 external recorder
- Sony BURANO
- Sony XDCAM PXW-FS7, with XDCA-FS7 plus AXS-R5 or HXR-IFR5 or external recorder (4K/2K raw recording)

== Uncompressed video output via HDMI ==
The below lists cameras with uncompressed video output. Processing has been done to convert the sensor response into a series of RGB images, but no video codec has applied any compression yet.

=== Nikon ===
- Nikon D4
- Nikon D4S
- Nikon D5
- Nikon D800/D800E
- Nikon D810/D810A
- Nikon D600
- Nikon D610
- Nikon D7100
- Nikon D5200
- Nikon D5300
- Nikon D750
- Nikon D5500
- Nikon D7200
- Nikon D500
- Nikon D850

== Other ==
Some Nikon Coolpix cameras which are not advertised as supporting a RAW image format can actually produce usable raw files if switched to a maintenance mode. Note that switching to this mode can invalidate a camera's guarantee. Nikon models with this capability:

E700, E800, E880, E900, E950, E990, E995, E2100, E2500, E3700, E4300, E4500.

Some Canon PowerShot cameras with DiGiC II and certain DiGiC III image processors which are not advertised as supporting a RAW format can actually produce usable raw files with an unofficial open-source firmware add-on by some users.

The Nokia N900 mobile phone has an add-on app "Fcam", which allows capture and saving of RAW files in Adobe's DNG format (along with other advanced features usually found in DSLRs). In 2013, Nokia launched the Nokia Lumia 1520 and Nokia Lumia 1020 smartphones with DNG RAW format.

Samsung Galaxy Note 5, Note 7, Galaxy S6 Edge+, S7 and S7 Edge also support RAW image capture. Not to mention LG G4, LG G5, iPhone 6s (Plus), iPhone SE, iPhone 7 (Plus) iPad Pro and some other modern phones - OnePlus One, OnePlus Two, OnePlus 3(T), etc.

== See also ==
- Raw image format
