= 8400 =

8400 or variation, may refer to:

== In general ==
- A.D. 8400, a year in the 9th millennium CE
- 8400 BCE, a year in the 9th millennium BC
- 8400, a number in the 8000 (number) range

== Other uses ==
- 8400 Tomizo, an asteroid in the Asteroid Belt, the 8400th asteroid registered
- Texas Instruments 8400 series ICs, a variant of the 7400-series integrated circuits
- Kintetsu 8400 series electric multiple unit train series

== See also ==
- E8400 (disambiguation)
