= D610 =

D610 may refer to:

- Nikon D610, a full-frame digital single-lens reflex camera
- Dell Latitude D610, a laptop computer
