= Panasonic Lumix DMC-FZ72 =

Panasonic Lumix DMC-FZ70
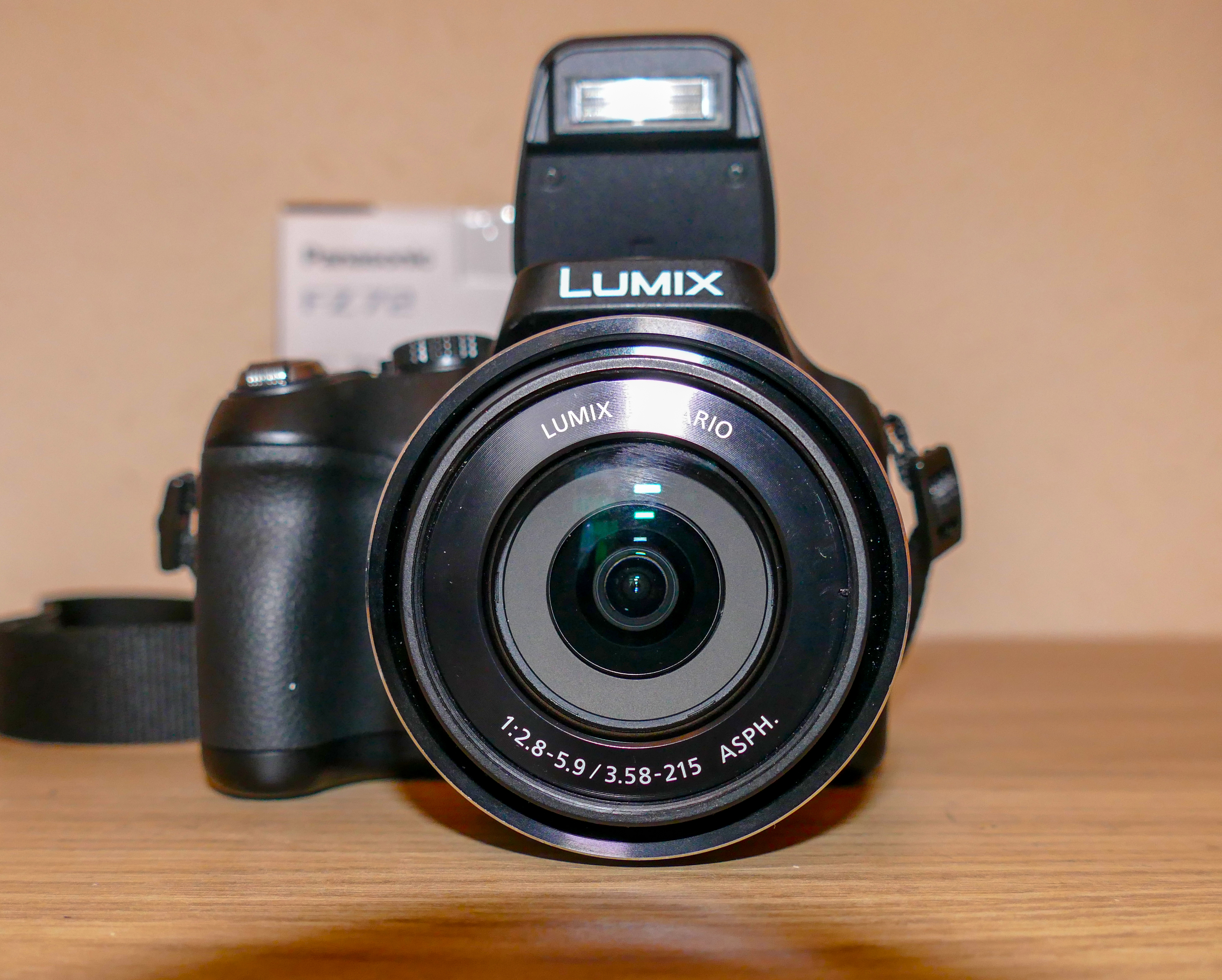

Overview
- Maker: Panasonic

Lens
- Lens: 20-1200mm equivalent
- F-numbers: f/2.8-f/5.9 at the widest

Sensor/medium
- Sensor type: CMOS
- Sensor size: 6.17 x 4.55mm (1/2.3 inch type)
- Maximum resolution: 4608 x 3456 (16 megapixels)
- Film speed: 100-6400
- Recording medium: SD, SDHC, SDXC

Focusing
- Focus modes: Normal / AF Macro / Macro Zoom / MF / Quick AF On / Off, Continuous AF (only movies) / AF/AE Button lock / Manual Focus / One shot AF, AF select area AF / AF Tracking
- Focus areas: 23 focus points; stills: 30 cm - infinity / 150 cm - infinity / AF Macro / MF / Intelligent Auto; movie: 1 cm - infinity / 150 cm - infinity

Flash
- Flash: built-in

Shutter
- Shutter speeds: 1/2000s to 8s
- Continuous shooting: 9 frames per second (slow continuous: 2fps)

Viewfinder
- Frame coverage: 100%

Image processing
- Image processor: Venus Engine
- White balance: Yes

General
- LCD screen: 3 inches with 460,000 dots
- Battery: Li-ion Battery Pack (7.2V, 895mAh, 6.5 Wh) rated for 400 shots (CIPA)
- Dimensions: 130.2 x 97 x 118.2 mm (5.12 x 3.82 x 4.65 inches)
- Weight: 606 g (21 oz) including battery

Chronology
- Predecessor: Panasonic Lumix DMC-FZ60/FZ62
- Successor: Panasonic Lumix DC-FZ80/FZ82 (2017)

The Panasonic Lumix DMC-FZ70 or Panasonic Lumix DMC-FZ72 is a DSLR-like ultrazoom bridge camera announced by Panasonic on July 18, 2013. It succeeds the Panasonic Lumix DMC-FZ62. FZ70 and FZ72 refer to the same camera model in different markets. The FZ70/72 has a 16 megapixel sensor and 20-1200mm equivalent, 60x optical zoom lens. Its successor is the FZ82 with a 18 megapixel sensor, 4K video and the same 60x optical zoom lens.

At the time of its release, the FZ70/72 had the largest advertised zoom range of available ultrazoom cameras, tying with the Canon PowerShot SX50 HS and Fujifilm FinePix SL1000 at the long end, and going to 20mm equivalent rather than the other cameras' 24mm in terms of wide angle.

== Other features ==
- Active power O.I.S. mode
- Wind shield soom microphone
- Implements DPOF print order format

== See also ==
- List of bridge cameras
