= E8400 =

E8400 may refer to:

- Nikon Coolpix 8400, a digital camera
- Intel Core 2 Duo E8400, a central processing unit
