= Nikon Coolpix 8400 =

Digital camera model

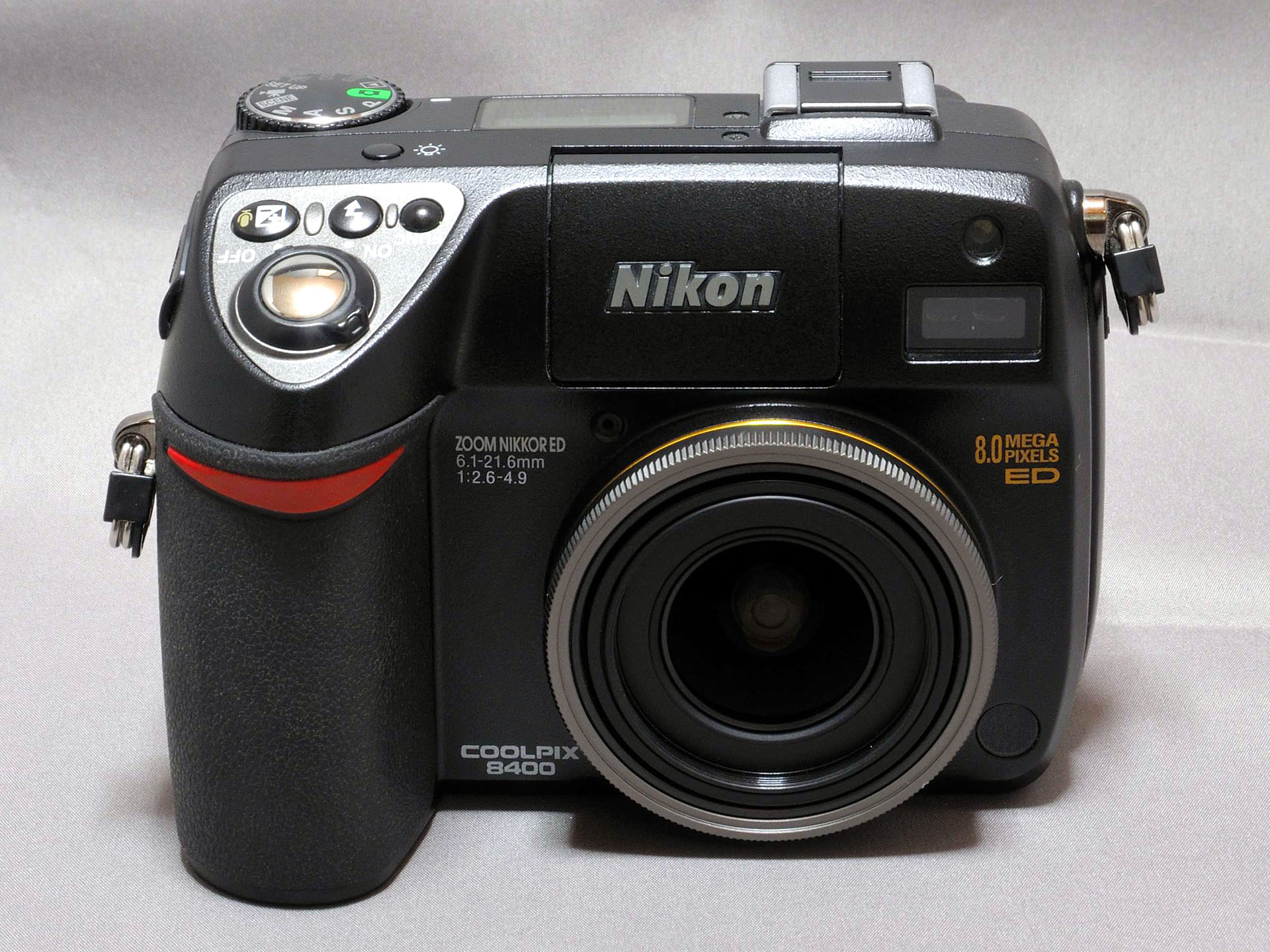
Coolpix 8400

The Nikon Coolpix 8400 is a digital camera announced September 16, 2004, succeeding the Nikon Coolpix 5400. It is a high-end model among the brand's range of bridge cameras with eight megapixels, only below the Nikon Coolpix 8800 equipped with a more powerful zoom lens. Besides its pixel count, its main selling point is the very wide angle lens, equivalent to a 24 mm in 135 film format. Its only competitor at a comparable price is the Kodak EasyShare P880, which has longer telephoto lens but is bigger and lacks a swivelling screen.

== Specifications ==
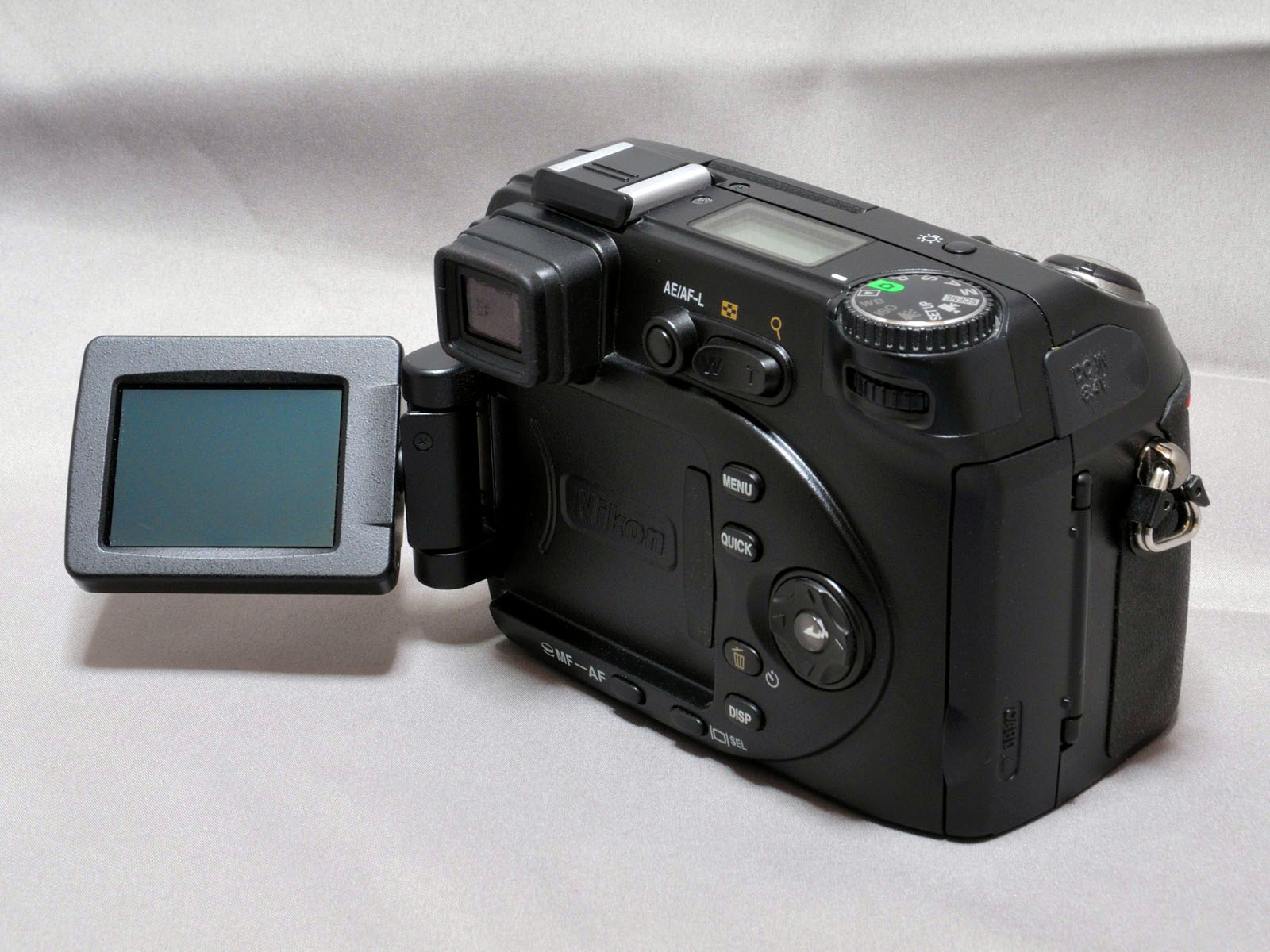
Vari-angle LCD monitor

Effective pixels
8.0 million (total pixels: 8.31 million)
Image size
8M (3,264 × 2,448), 3:2 (3,264 × 2,176), 5M (2,592 × 1,944), 3M (2,048 × 1,536), 2M (1,600 × 1,200), 1M (1,280 × 960), PC (1,024 × 768), TV (640 × 480)
Lens / Digital zoom
3.5× Zoom-Nikkor; 6.1–21.6 mm [35 mm (135) format equivalent to 24–85 mm]; f/2.6–4.9; 10 elements in 7 groups; two glass molded ED lens elements included; 4× digital zoom
Focus range
50 cm (20 in) to infinity (∞); 3 cm (1.2 in) to infinity (∞) (W), 20 cm (7.9 in) to infinity (∞) (T) in macro and manual focus modes
Storage media
CompactFlash(CF) Card (Type I/II) and Microdrive
Storage
File system: Compliant with Design rule for Camera File system (DCF), Exif 2.2, and Digital Print Order Format (DPOF); File formats: RAW (NEF) and TIFF-RGB (uncompressed), JPEG-baseline-compliant (1:2, 1:4, 1:8, 1:16) (compressed), QuickTime (movies), WAV (sound files). When connected to computer via USB port, camera implements a mass storage device, containing folder with images. It does not need any special software to get the data from it. Data transfer via USB works also under Linux.
Number of frames (approx.)
RAW: 20, HI: 10, EXTRA:30, FINE: 60, NORMAL: 125, BASIC: 240 (With 256 MB CF Card, image size 3,264 × 2,448).
Shooting modes
AUTO, SCENE (Portrait, Party/Indoor, Night portrait, Beach/Snow, Landscape, Sunset, Night landscape, Museum, Fireworks show, Close up, Copy, Back light, Panorama assist, Sports, Dusk/Dawn), P, S, A, M, MOVIE
Built-in Speedlight
Shooting range: approx. 0.5–6.0 m (1.6–19.7 ft) (W), approx. 0.5–3.0 m (1.6–9.8 ft) (T); Flash modes: 1) Auto Flash, 2) Flash Cancel, 3) Red-eye Reduction (In-Camera Red-Eye Fix), 4) Anytime Flash, 5) Night Portrait (Slow Sync Flash), 6) Rear Curtain Sync; Sync method: Standard i-TTL flash
Power requirements
One Rechargeable Li-ion Battery EN-EL7 (included), Battery Pack MB-CP10 (optional) with six 1.5 V LR6 (AA-size alkaline) batteries (1.5 V FR Lithium or 1.2 V NiMH can also be used), AC Adapter EH-54 (optional)
Battery life
Approx. 260 images (EN-EL7; based on CIPA standard, Industry standard for measuring life of camera batteries. Measured at 25 °C (77 °F); zoom adjusted with each shot, built-in Speedlight fired with every other shot, image mode set to NORMAL/8M)
Dimensions (W × H × D)
Approx. 113 × 82 × 75 mm (4.4 × 3.2 × 3.0 in.)
Weight
Approx. 400 g (14 oz) (without battery and storage media)
