= Kintetsu 8000 series =

Japanese train type

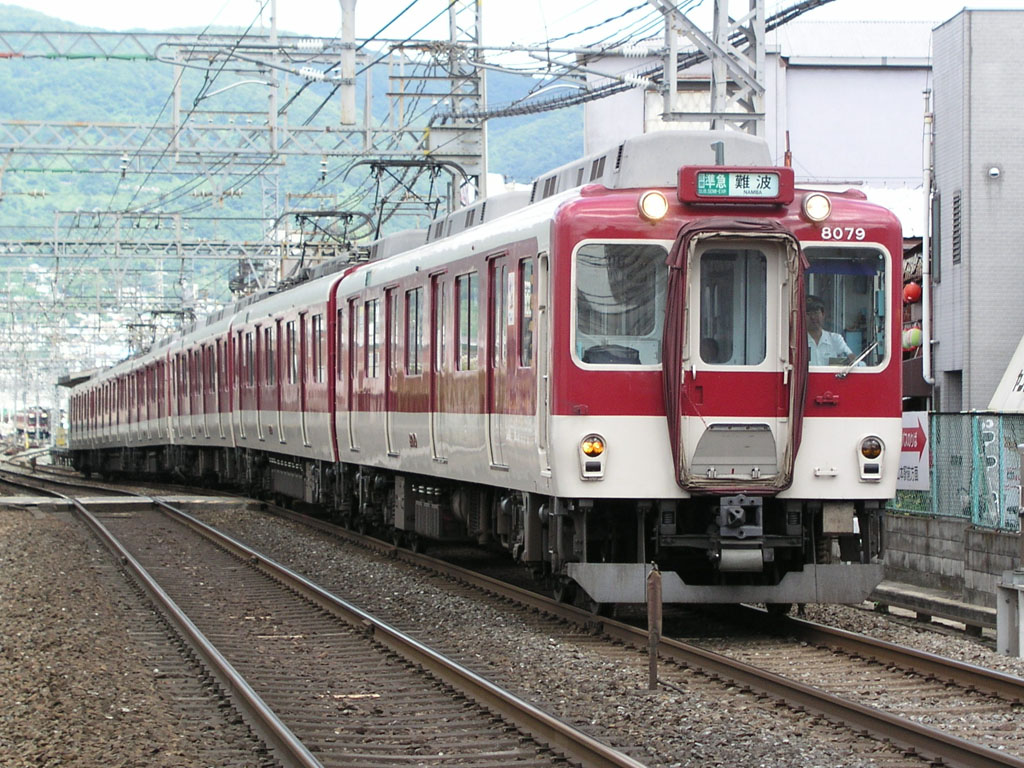
Kintetsu 8000 series set #8079 on a service to Osaka-Namba

The Kintetsu 8000 series (近鉄8000系, Kintetsu 8000-kei) is an electric multiple unit (EMU) train type operated by the private railway operator Kintetsu Railway since 1964 on many of its commuter lines in the Kansai area of Japan.

== Design ==
First introduced in 1964, the design is based on the Kintetsu 900 series commuter train, also manufactured by Kinki Sharyo. All trainsets run on standard gauge 1,435 mm (4 ft 8 1/2 in) tracks.

At the time of introduction, the 8000 series and its sub-variants were the most common type found on the railway at 355 cars produced.

== Variants ==
- 8000 series: 2-car and 4-car sets primarily used on the Nara Line
- 8400 series: 2-car, 3-car and 4-car sets primarily used on the Nara Line with various improvements from the base model
- 8600 series: 4-car sets primarily used on the Nara Line with upgraded cooling systems
- 8800 series: 4-car sets primarily used on the Nara Line designated as test units for regenerative braking

== 8000 series ==
8000 series
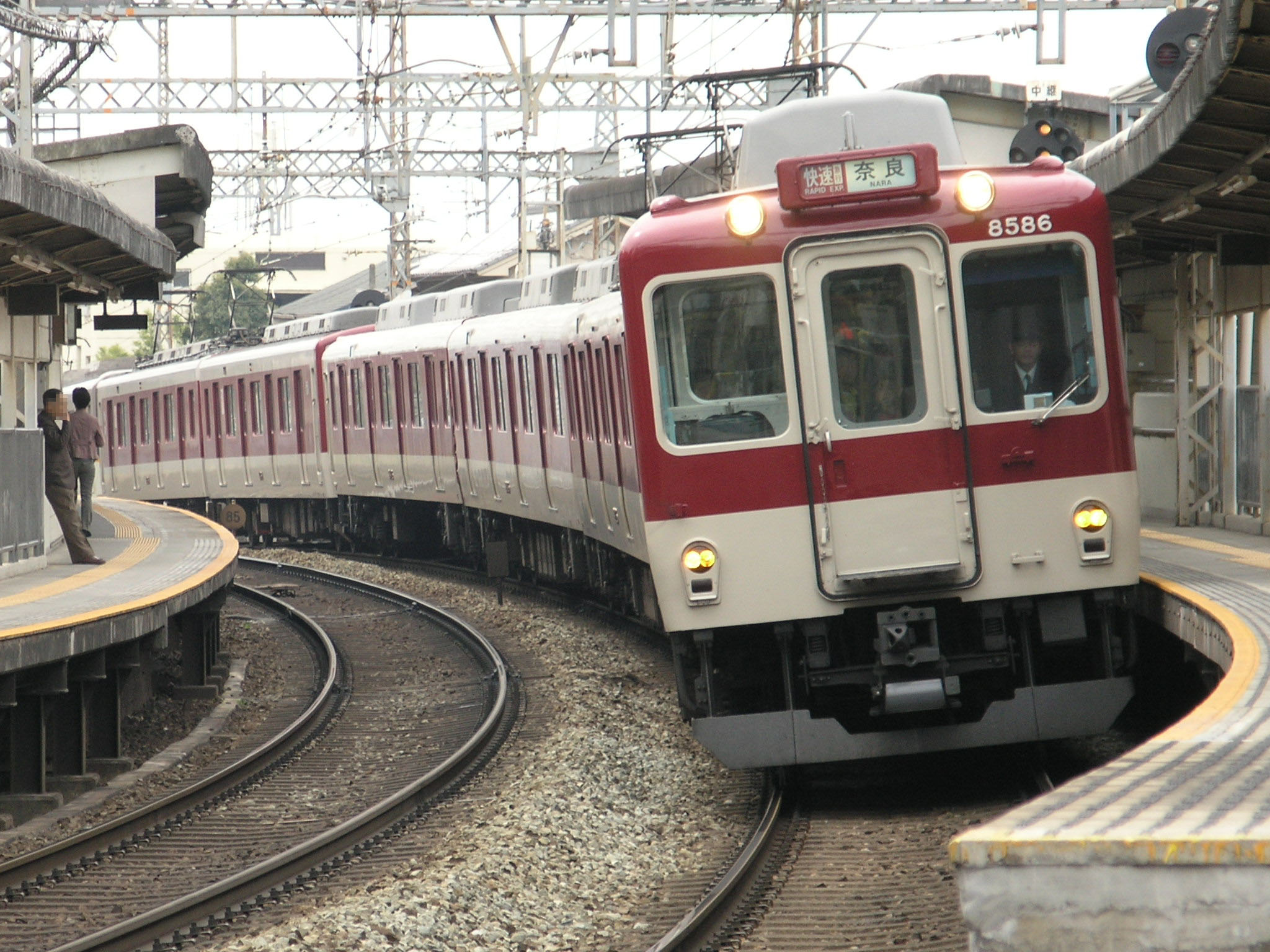
- Set 8086 passing Hiraoka Station
- In service: 1964–present
- Manufacturer: Kinki Sharyo
- Constructed: 1964–1980
- Entered service: 1964
- Refurbished: 2003–2004
- Scrapped: 1996–2019
- Number built: 208 vehicles (68 sets)
- Number in service: 34 vehicles (9 sets)
- Number scrapped: 174 vehicles
- Formation: 2-, 3-, or 4-cars per trainset
- Fleet numbers: E31-E58, E60, E63, E75, E85, E87, L21-L30, L61-L69, L72-L73, L81-L84, L86, L88, B70-B71, B76-B79
- Capacity: 170 (end cars); 190 (intermediate cars)
- Operators: Kintetsu Railway
- Depots: Higashi Hanazono
- Lines served: Nara Line

Specifications
- Car length: 20,720 mm (67 ft 11 3/4 in)
- Width: 2,800 mm (9 ft 2 1/4 in)
- Height: 4,012 mm (13 ft 2 in) Cars with electric fans
- Doors: 4 pairs per side
- Maximum speed: 105 km/h (65 mph)
- Power output: 145 kW (194 hp) per motor
- Electric system(s): 1,500 V DC Overhead wire
- Current collector(s): Pantograph
- Bogies: KD-51/KD-64
- Track gauge: 1,435 mm (4 ft 8 1/2 in)

The 8000 series is the base variant in the 8000 series family.

Set 8059 was involved in the 1972 Nara Line bombing incident. Afterwards, the cars were reincorporated into different trainsets by 1976.

=== Formations ===
The 4-car sets are formed as follows.

Car No.	1	2	3	4
Numbering	Ku 8700	Mo 8000	Mo 8200	Ku 8500

The 3-car sets are formed as follows.

Car No.	1	2	3
Numbering	Mo 8000	Mo 8250	Ku 8500

=== Past formations ===
Until 2004 and for a brief while in 2014, the series was formed into some two-car trainsets.

Car No.	1	2
Numbering	Mo 8000	Ku 8500

In 1968, one four-car set, (#8069) and one two-car set (#8074) were combined into a 6-car train as an aluminum prototype. The set was scrapped in 2005.

Car No.	1	2	3	4	5	6
Numbering	Mo 8000	Sa 8710	Mo 8210	Sa 8500	Mo 8000	Ku 8500

=== Interior ===
Seating consists of longitudinal seating throughout.

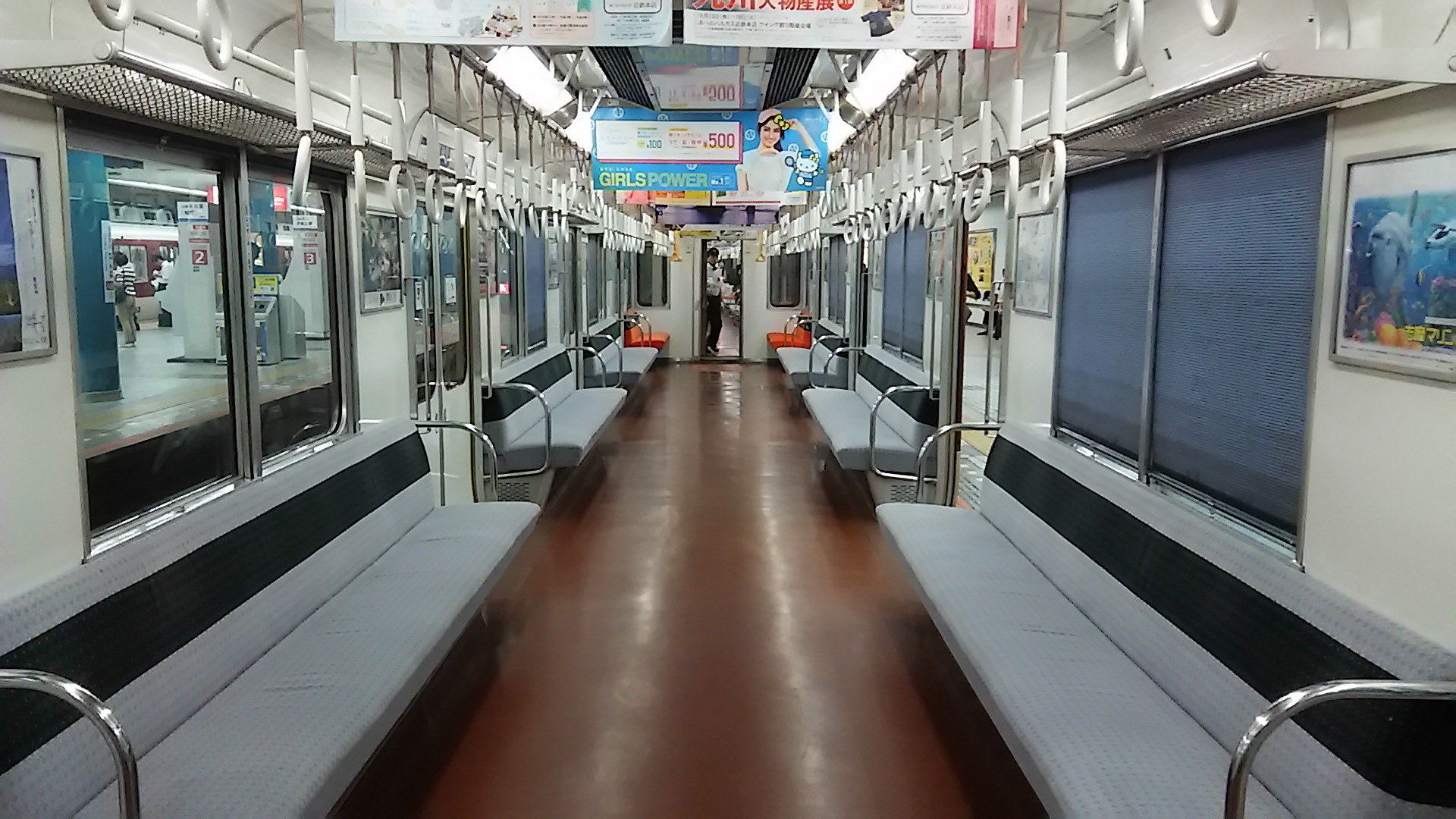
8000 series interior with updated seat fabric

=== Disposal ===
Scrapping began in 1997 with eight sets, with more sets gradually undergoing disposal until 2004.

As of 1 April 2019, two 3-car sets and seven 4-car sets remain in service. No two-car sets remain.

== 8400 series ==
8400 series
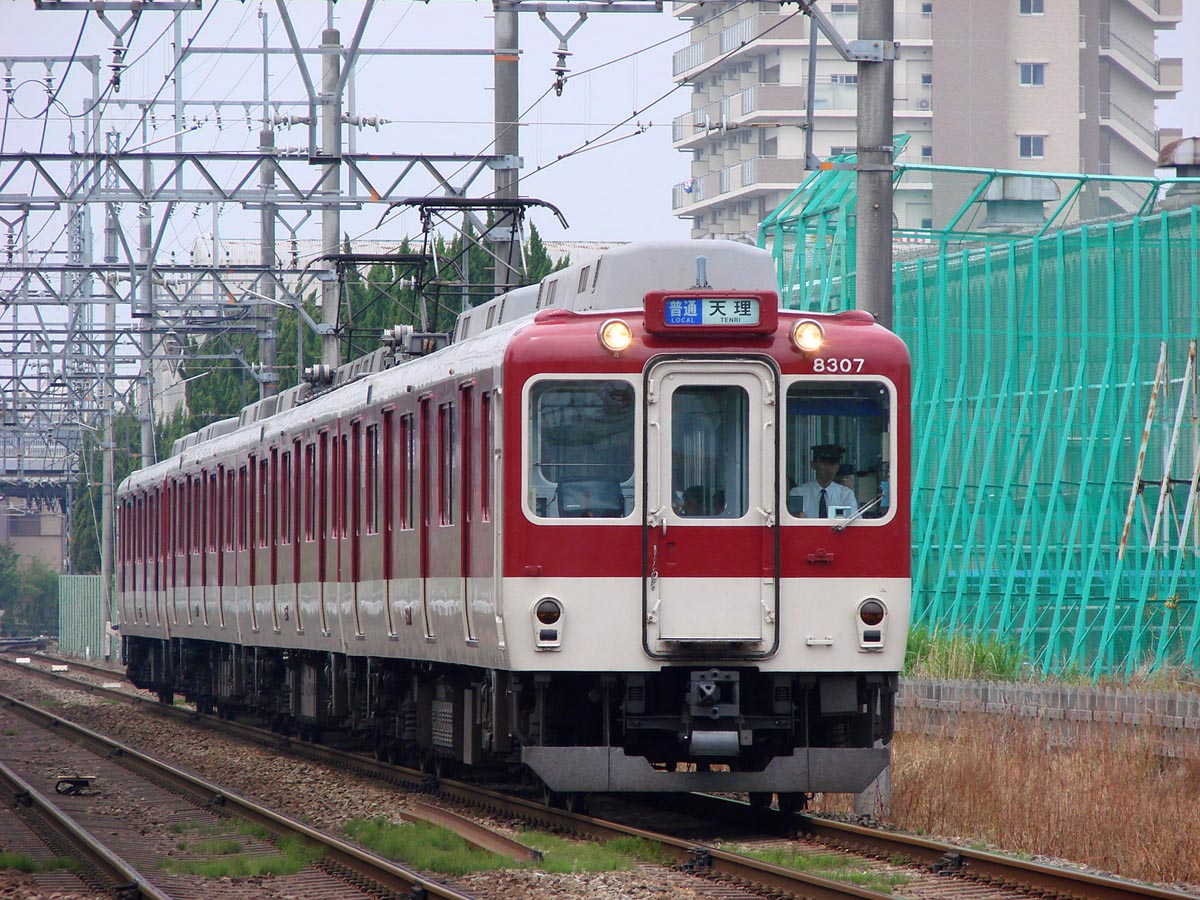
- Set 8407 on a service to Tenri
- In service: 1969–present
- Manufacturer: Kinki Sharyo
- Constructed: 1969–1972
- Entered service: 1969
- Refurbished: 2003
- Scrapped: 2004–2019
- Number built: 80 vehicles (16 sets)
- Number in service: 45 vehicles (11 sets)
- Number scrapped: 35 vehicles
- Formation: 2- or 4-cars per trainset
- Fleet numbers: L01-L08, E05, E10, B09, B11-B16
- Capacity: 170 (end cars); 190 (intermediate cars)
- Operators: Kintetsu Railway
- Depots: Higashi Hanazono; Saidaiji
- Lines served: Nara Line

Specifications
- Car length: 20,720 mm (67 ft 11 3/4 in)
- Width: 2,800 mm (9 ft 2 1/4 in)
- Height: 4.15 m (13 ft 7 3/8 in)Cars with electric fans
- Doors: 4 pairs per side
- Maximum speed: 105 km/h (65.2 mph)
- Power output: 145 kW (194 hp) per motor
- Electric system(s): 1,500 V DC Overhead wire
- Current collector(s): Pantograph
- Bogies: KD-64(A)/KD-73B/KD-76A
- Track gauge: 1,435 mm (4 ft 8 1/2 in)

The 8400 series are 8000 series sets with modifications to the location of various onboard equipment. The three-car sets are re-fitted for wanman driver-only operation.

=== Formations ===
The 4-car sets are formed as follows.

Car No.	1	2	3	4
Numbering	Ku 8350	Mo 8400	Mo 8450	Ku 8300

The 3-car sets are formed as follows.

Car No.	1	2	3
Numbering	Mo 8400	Mo 8450	Ku 8300

=== Past formations ===
Until 2014, there was a lone two-car trainset.

Car No.	1	2
Numbering	Mo 8400	Ku 8300

=== Interior ===
Seating consists of longitudinal seating throughout.

=== Disposal ===
Scrapping began in 2004 with set 8401, with more sets gradually undergoing disposal through 2019.

As of April 1, 2019, 45 of 80 cars, consisting of seven 3-car sets and six 4-car sets, remain in service. The sole 2-car set was withdrawn and scrapped in 2014.

== 8600 series ==
8600 series
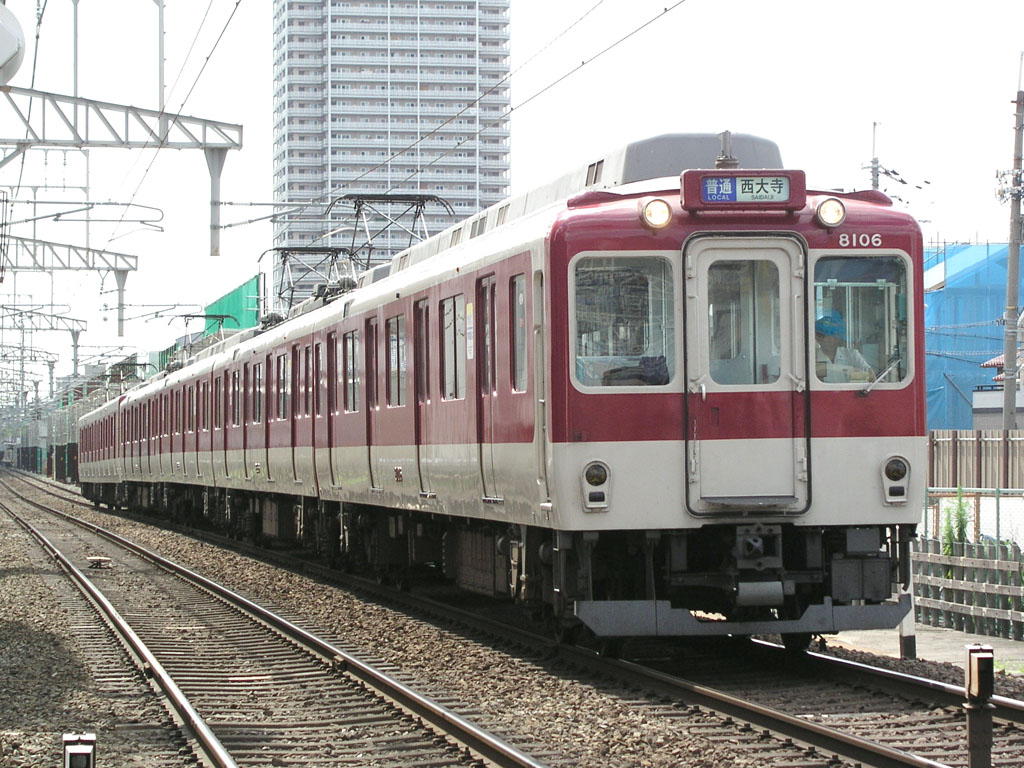
- Set 8606 near Kawachi-Hanazono Station
- In service: 1973–present
- Manufacturer: Kinki Sharyo
- Constructed: 1973–1979
- Entered service: 1973
- Refurbished: 2003–2004
- Scrapped: 1996–2019
- Number built: 84 vehicles (21 sets)
- Number in service: 86 vehicles (21 sets)
- Number scrapped: 174 vehicles
- Formation: 4- or 6-cars per trainset
- Fleet numbers: X51-X69, X71-X72
- Capacity: 170 (end cars); 190 (intermediate cars)
- Operators: Kintetsu Railway
- Depots: Higashi Hanazono; Saidaiji
- Lines served: Nara Line

Specifications
- Car length: 20,720 mm (67 ft 11 3/4 in)
- Width: 2,800 mm (9 ft 2 1/4 in)
- Height: 4.012 m (13 ft 2 in)Cars with electric fans
- Doors: 4 pairs per side
- Maximum speed: 105 km/h (65 mph)
- Power output: 145 kW (194 hp) per motor
- Electric system(s): 1,500 V DC Overhead wire
- Current collector(s): Pantograph
- Bogies: KD-76
- Track gauge: 1,435 mm (4 ft 8 1/2 in)

Notes/references
- One set contains the two rebuilt 8000 series cars from the 1972 Nara Line bombing

The 8600 series started appearing in 1973.

=== Formations ===
The four-car sets are formed as follows.

Car No.	1	2	3	4
Designation	Mo 8600	Sa 8150	Mo 8650	Ku 8100

The four-car sets involved in field phase control are formed as follows.

Car No.	1	2	3	4
Designation	Ku 8150	Mo 8600	Mo 8650	Ku 8100

The lone six-car set is formed as follows.

Car No.	1	2	3	4	5	6
Designation	Mo 8600	Sa 8150	Mo 8650	Sa 8150	Mo 8650	Ku 8100

=== Interior ===
Seating consists of longitudinal seating throughout.

=== Gallery ===
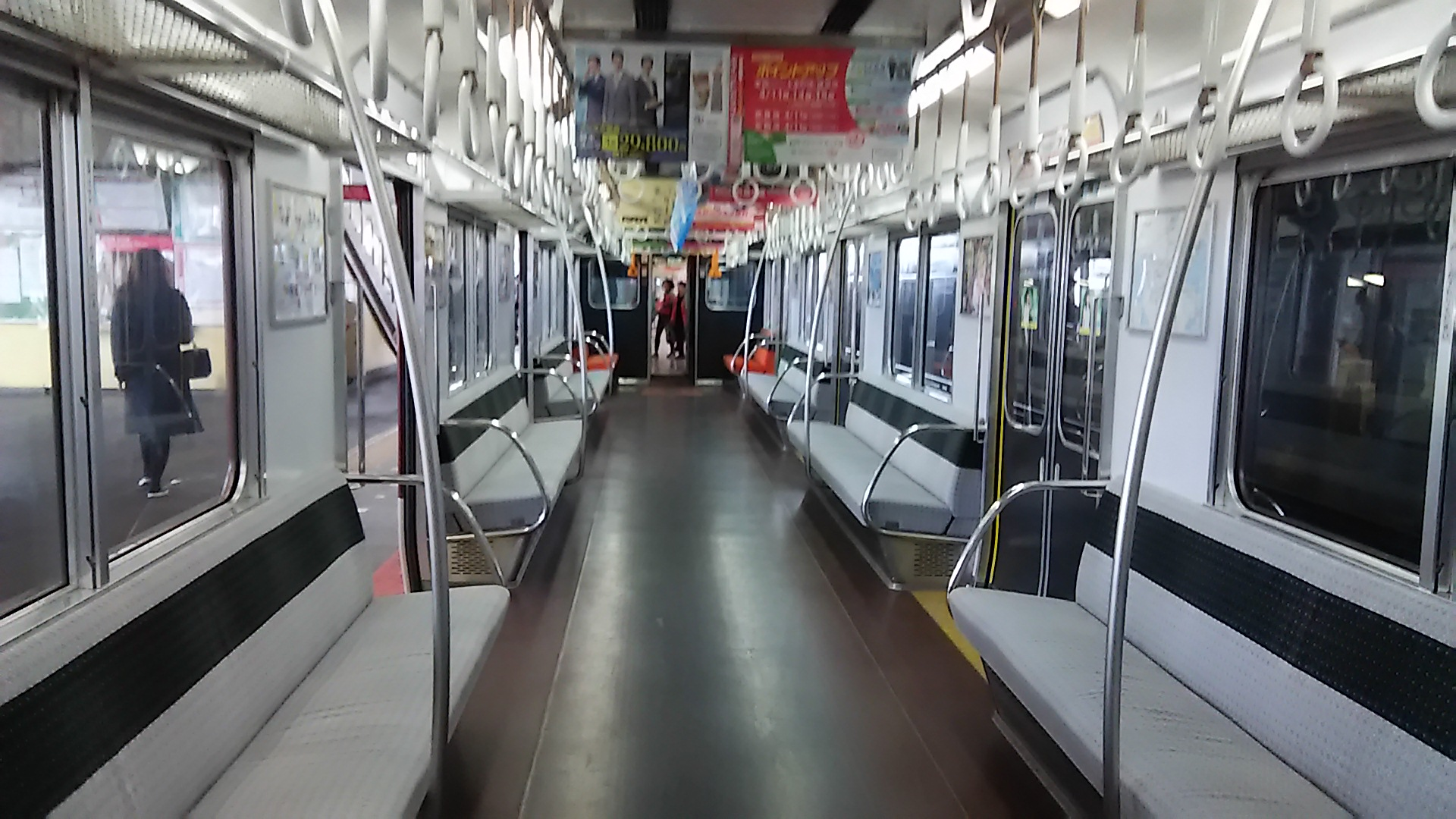
Interior of 8622

== 8800 series ==
8800 series
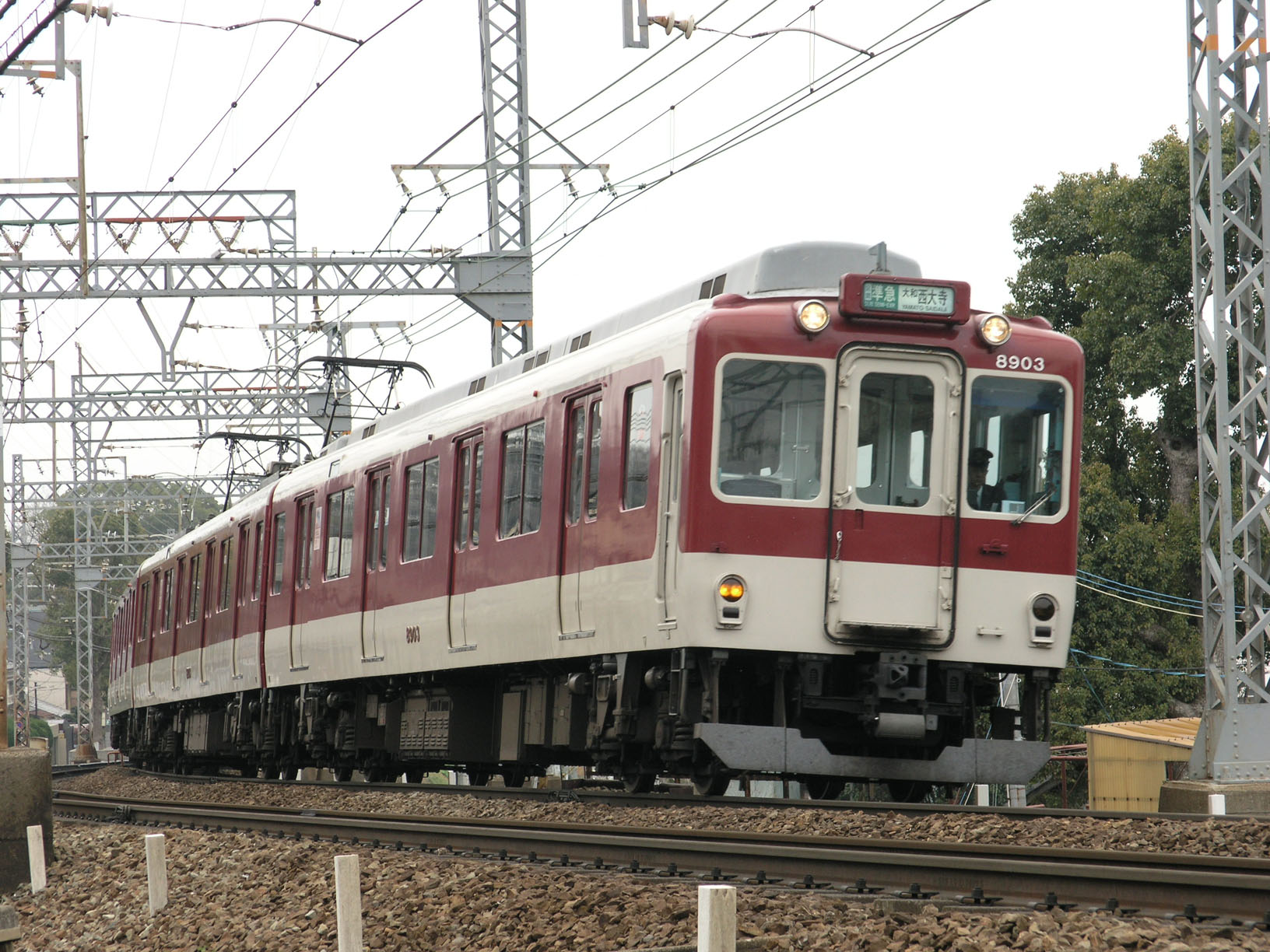
- Set 8804 on the Nara Line
- In service: 1980–present
- Manufacturer: Kinki Sharyo
- Constructed: 1980
- Entered service: 1980
- Refurbished: 1999
- Number built: 8 vehicles (2 sets)
- Number in service: 8 vehicles (2 sets)
- Formation: 4-cars per trainset
- Fleet numbers: FL02, FL04
- Capacity: 170 (end cars); 190 (intermediate cars)
- Operators: Kintetsu Railway
- Depots: Higashi Hanazono
- Lines served: Nara Line

Specifications
- Car length: 20,720 mm (67 ft 11 3/4 in)
- Width: 2,800 mm (9 ft 2 1/4 in)
- Doors: 4 pairs per side
- Maximum speed: 105 km/h (65 mph)
- Power output: 145 kW (194 hp) per motor
- Electric system(s): 1,500 V DC Overhead wire
- Current collector(s): Pantograph
- Bogies: KD-86
- Track gauge: 1,435 mm (4 ft 8 1/2 in)

This sub-series features regenerative braking.

=== Formations ===
Car No.	1	2	3	4
Designation	Ku 8900	Mo 8800	Mo 8800	Ku 8900

=== Interior ===
Seating consists of longitudinal seating throughout.

=== Gallery ===
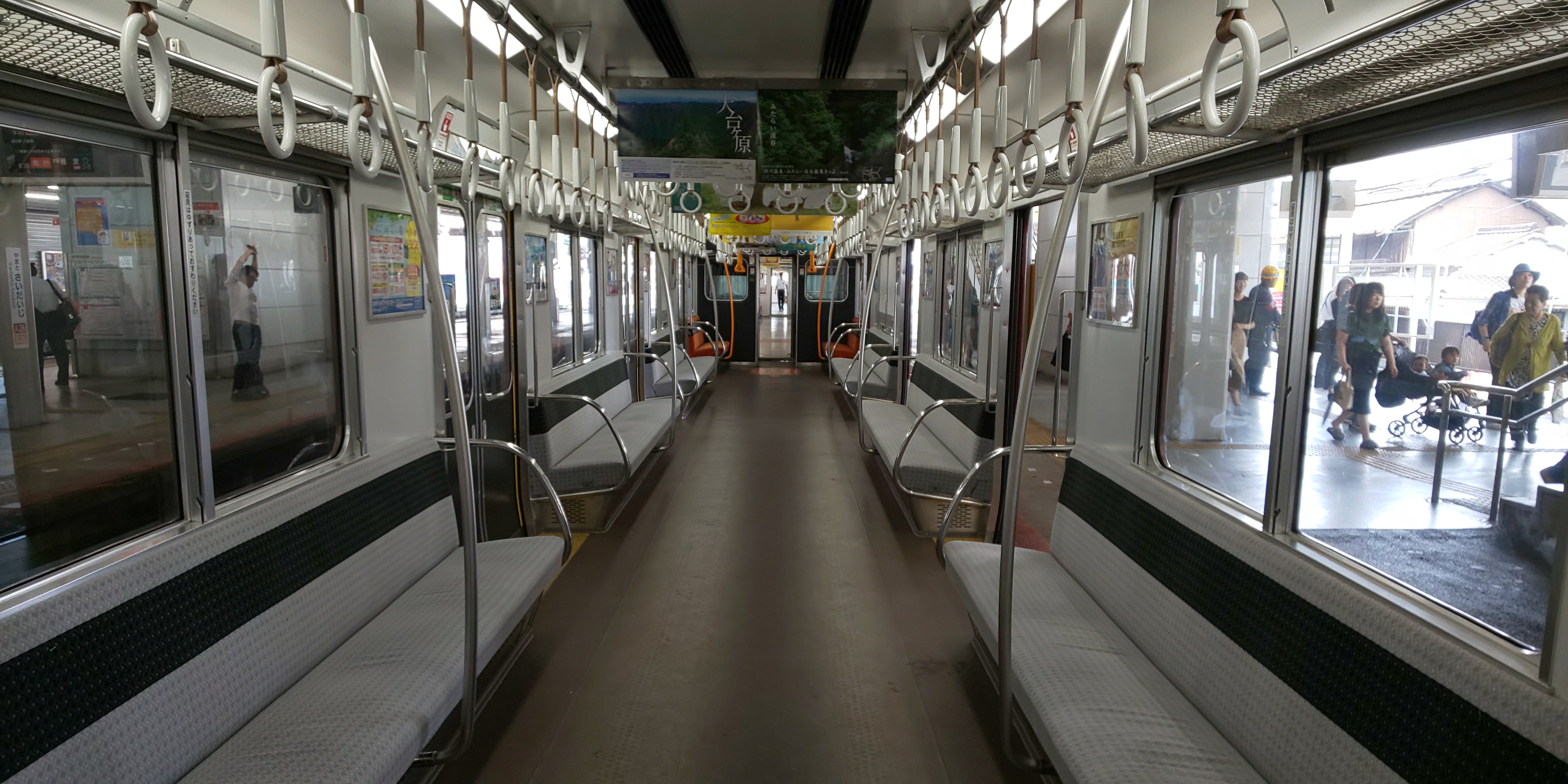
Interior of 8802

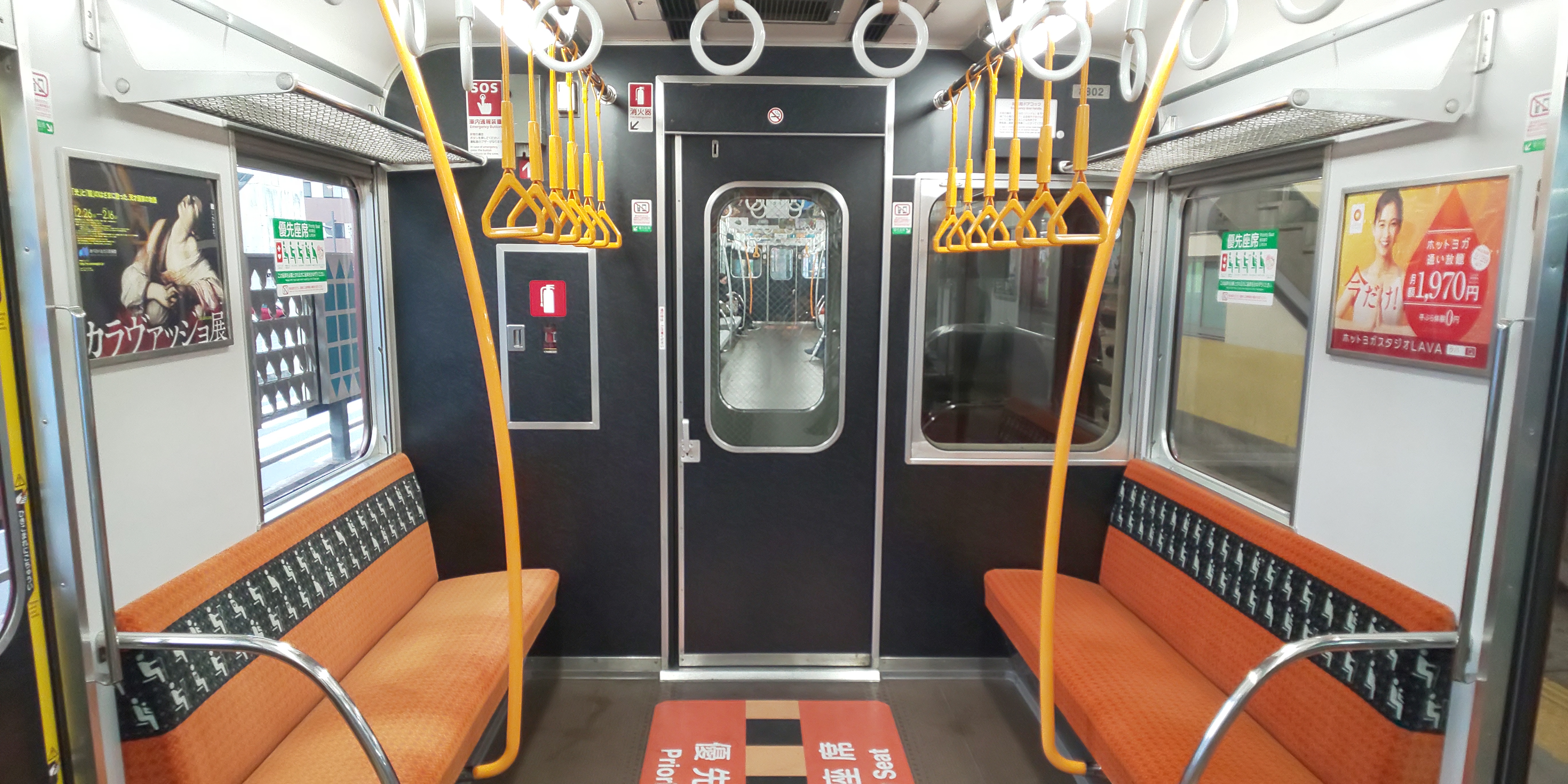
Priority seating section of 8802 after seat remodelling work
