= Panasonic Lumix DMC-FZ62 =

Panasonic Lumix DMC-FZ60
Overview
- Maker: Panasonic Lumix
- Type: SLR

Lens
- Lens mount: LEICA DC VARIO-ELMARIT
- F-numbers: 2.8 - 5.2

Sensor/medium
- Sensor type: CMOS
- Sensor size: 1/2.3-inch
- Maximum resolution: 16 megapixels
- Storage media: SD, SDHC, SDXC

Focusing
- Focus modes: Normal / AF Macro / Macro Zoom / MF / Quick AF On/Off, AF continuous (only movies), / Button lock AF / AE / One shot AF, AF select area AF / AF Tracking
- Focus areas: Normal: 30 cm - infinity / 200 cm - infinity / AF Macro / MF /Intelligent Auto / Movie: 1 cm - infinity / 100 cm – infinity

Flash
- Flash: built-in

Shutter
- Frame rate: 2 - 10
- Shutter speeds: 4 - 1/2000

General
- LCD screen: 3.0" TFT Touch Screen LCD
- Battery: Li-ion Battery Pack (7.2V, 895mAh)
- Dimensions: 120,3 x 80,8 x 91,9 mm
- Weight: 493 g (17 oz) (1.06 lbs) with Battery and SD Memory Card

The Panasonic Lumix DMC-FZ60 or Panasonic Lumix DMC-FZ62 is a DSLR-like ultrazoom bridge camera announced by Panasonic back in 2012. FZ60 is for Americas and Asia-Pacific, while the FZ62 is for Europe and CIS. The highest-resolution pictures it records is 16.1 megapixels, through its 25mm Leica DC VARIO-ELMARIT.

Its successor is the FZ70/72 with a 16 megapixel sensor and 60x optical zoom lens.

== Properties ==
- 24x optical zoom
- 16.1 megapixels sensor MOS
- Light Speed AF
- Full HD movie 1.920 x 1.080
- Creative Control & Creative Retouch with 14 effects
