= Olympus SP-350 =

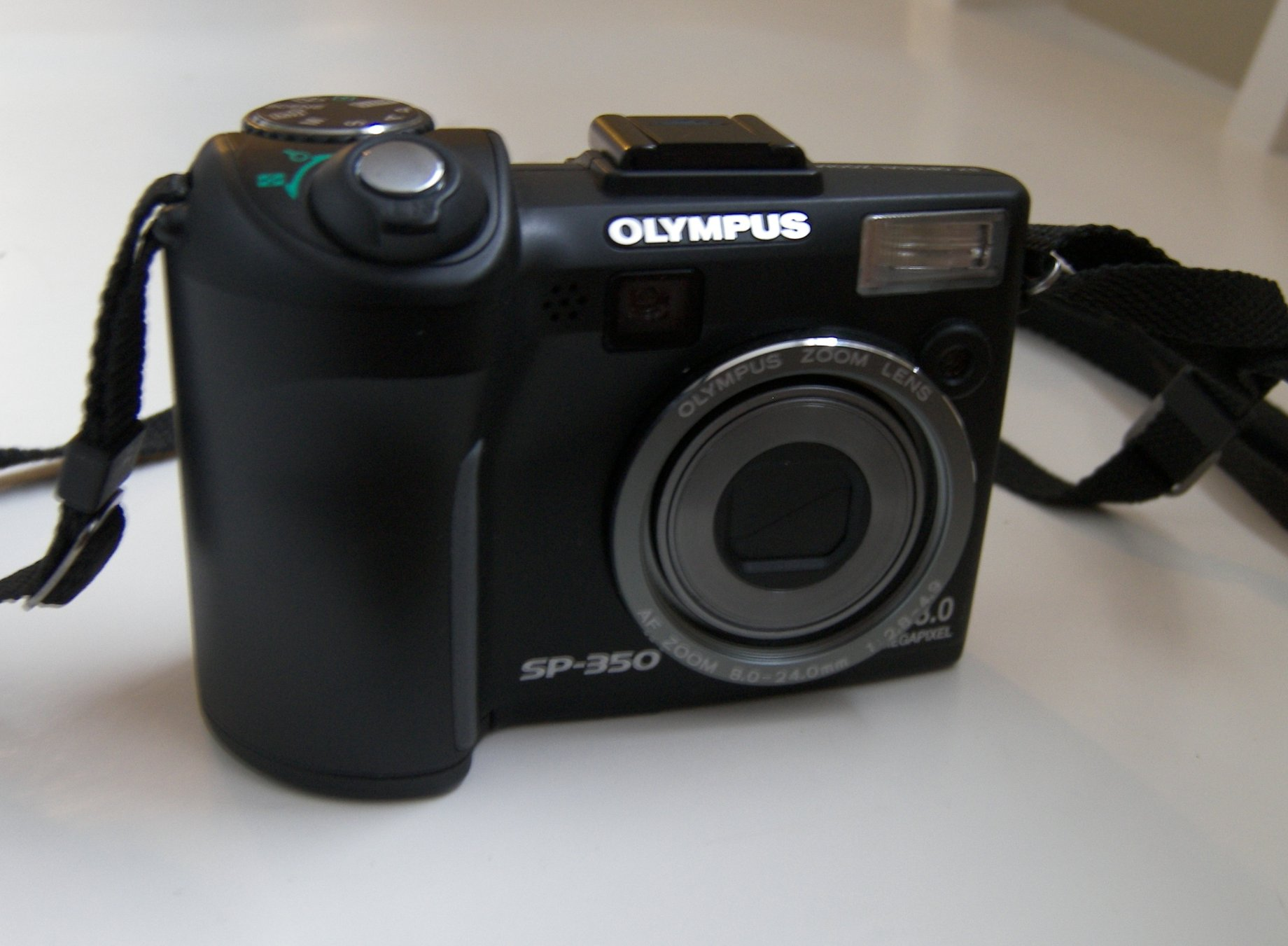

Olympus SP-350 is 8-megapixel compact digital camera. The model was announced by its maker on August 29, 2005.

It has the following specifications:

- Sensor size: 1/1.8 " (7.18 x 5.32 mm)
- CCD Sensor with 8.1 million effective pixels (8.3 million photo detectors)
- Maximum resolution: 3264 x 2448
- Optional resolutions: 2592 x 1944, 2288 x 1712, 2048 x 1536, 1600 x 1200, 1280 x 960, 1024 x 768, 640 x 480
- Image ratio w:h: 4:3 or 3:2
- Color filter array: RGB
- ISO settings : Auto, 50, 100, 200, 400
- Zoom wide: 8mm (38 mm equivalent)
- Zoom telephoto: 24mm (114 mm equivalent ) (3 x)
- Aperture range: F2.8 - F4.9
- 5x Digital zoom
- Auto Focus (TTL) & Manual Focus
- Normal focus range: 20 cm
- Macro focus range: 5 cm
- White balance override: 5 positions
- Min shutter speed: 15 sec + Bulb
- Max shutter speed: 1/2000 sec
- Built-in Flash
- Flash guide no.: 3.8 m (12.4 ft) 8 m
- External flash with hot shoe
- Flash modes: Auto, Red-Eye, Forced, Off, Slow 1&2
- Exposure compensation range: -2 to +2 EV in 1/3 EV steps
- Metering options: ESP multi-pattern, CW Avg, Spot
- Shooting modes: aperture priority, shutter priority, manual, scene modes, movie mode
- Optional adapter available (lens threads)
- Continuous Drive: 2.4/1.4 frame/s for 2/8 images
- Movie clips sizes: 640 x 480 (12.987 frames per second), 320 x 240 (29.97 frame/s)
- Self-timer
- Storage types: xD flash media & 32 MB internal / built-in
- Uncompressed format: RAW
- Compressed format: JPEG (Exif 2.2)
- Jpeg quality levels: standard quality (SQ), high quality (HQ) & super high quality (SHQ)
- Optical Viewfinder
- LCD screen size: 2.5 inches diagonally
- LCD resolution: 115,000 pixels
- Battery types: AA (2) batteries or CRV3
- Weight including batteries: 245 g (8.6 oz)
- Dimensions: 100 x 65 x 35 mm (3.9 x 2.6 x 1.4 in)

Olympus released a firmware update that was rumored to address battery life problems. However, battery life is still poor with alkaline batteries, below average with nickel metal halides batteries and good with lithium batteries (CRV3s).
