= Nikon Coolpix 5400 =

Digital camera model

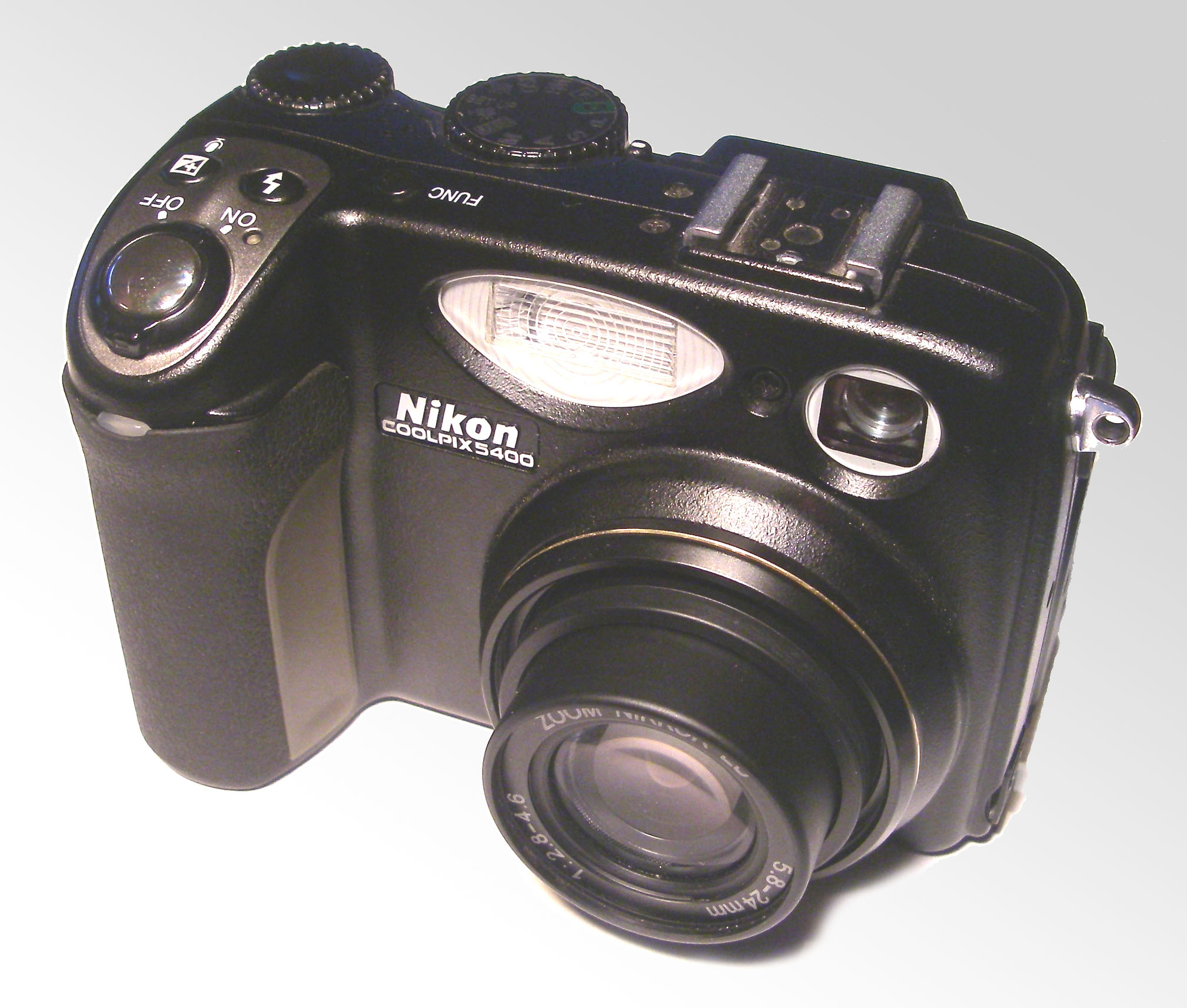
- Thumb
- Maker: Nikon

Lens
- Lens: 4x Zoom-Nikkor; f=5.8-24mm

Sensor/medium
- Sensor: CCD
- Maximum resolution: 5.1 megapixels
- Film speed: 50, 100, 200, 400 (ISO equivalent)
- Recording medium: CF Card

Exposure/metering
- Exposure metering: Matrix, centre-weighted, spot and AF spot

Flash
- Flash: yes

Shutter
- Shutter speed range: 1/8000 to 10min in various modes

Viewfinder
- Viewfinder: yes

General
- LCD screen: 1.5", 134,000 pixel TFT
- Battery: Nikon EN-EL1 Lithium-Ion & charger
- Weight: 320 g (11.3 oz) [without battery and storage media]

The Coolpix 5400 was a 5.1 megapixel 'prosumer' digital camera produced by Nikon. Announced at the end of May 2003 as the immediate successor to the Nikon Coolpix 5000, it features 4x optical zoom, 4x digital zoom, and many other functions.

== Technical specification ==
- Max resolution: 2592 x 1944
- Low resolution: 2592 x 1728, 1600 x 1200, 1280 x 960, 1024 x 768, 640 x 480
- Image ratio w:h: 4:3, 3:2
- Effective pixels: 5.0 million
- Sensor photo detectors: 5.2 million
- Sensor size: 1/1.8" (7.18 x 5.32 mm, 0.38 cm^{2})
- Pixel density: 13 MP/cm^{2}
- Sensor type: CCD
- Sensor manufacturer: Unknown
- ISO rating: Auto, 50, 100, 200, 400
- Zoom wide (W): 28 mm
- Zoom tele (T): 116 mm (4.1x)
- Digital zoom: Yes, 4x
- Image stabilization: No
- Auto Focus: Unknown
- Manual Focus: Yes
- Normal focus range: 50 cm
- Macro focus range: 1 cm
- White balance override 5 positions, fine tunable, manual preset
- Aperture range: F2.8 - F8.0
- Min shutter: 8 sec
- Max shutter: 1/4000 sec
- Built-in Flash: Yes
- Flash range: 3 m
- External flash: Yes, ISO 518 hot-shoe
- Flash modes: Auto, Fill-in, Red-Eye reduction, Slow (front/rear), Off
- Exposure compensation: -2 to +2 EV in 1/3 EV steps
- Metering: 256 segment Matrix, Center-Weighted, Spot, Spot AF Area
- Aperture priority: no
- Shutter priority: Yes
- Lens thread: Req. optional adapter (28 mm)
- Continuous Drive: Yes, 3 frame/s, max 7 images
- Movie Clips: Yes, 640 x 480 up to 70 sec, 320 x 240 up to 180 sec (both 15 frame/s with audio)
- Remote control: Yes, USB wired (Optional) - MC-EU1
- Self-timer: Yes, 3 or 10 sec
- Timelapse recording: Yes
- Orientation sensor: No
- Storage types: Compact Flash (Type I or II)
- Storage included: 16 MB Compact Flash
- Uncompressed format: Yes, TIFF, RAW with firmware 1.4
- Quality Levels: Hi, Fine, Normal, Basic
- Viewfinder: Optical (Tunnel)
- LCD: 1.5 "
- LCD Dots: 134,000
- Live View: No
- USB: USB 1.0 (1.5 Mbit/s)
- HDMI: No
- Wireless: No
- Environmentally sealed: No
- Battery: Nikon EN-EL1 Lithium-Ion & charger included or 2CR5
- Weight (inc. batteries): 400 g (14.1 oz)
- Dimensions: 108 x 73 x 69 mm (4.3 x 2.9 x 2.7 in)
- Notes: BSS, AE-BSS, Fine tunable WB
