= Panasonic Lumix DMC-GM1 =

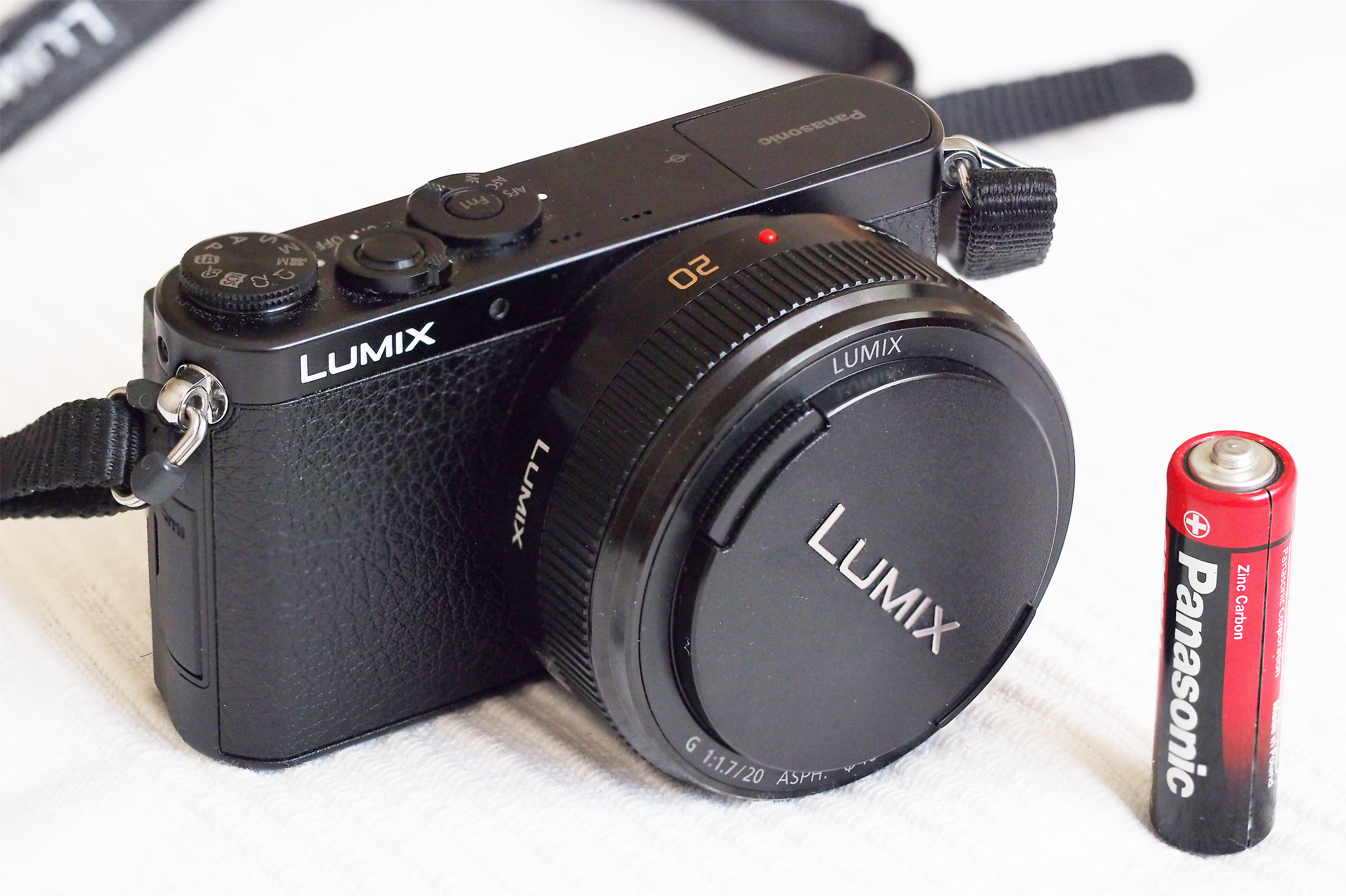

Overview
- Maker: Panasonic
- Type: Micro Four Thirds system

Lens
- Lens: Micro Four Thirds system mount

Sensor/medium
- Sensor: 4/3 type CMOS
- Sensor size: 17.3 x 13.0 mm (in 4:3 aspect ratio)
- Maximum resolution: 4592 x 3448 (16.84 megapixels)
- Storage media: SD /SDHC / SDXC

Focusing
- Focus modes: AF Single, AF Flexible, AF Continuous, Manual focus, Face Detection, AF Tracking, 23 Area Focusing / 1 Area Focusing, Pinpoint, AF detection range: EV -4 – 18 (ISO 100), Quick AF, Continuous AF, AF+MF, Touch AF/AE, Touch Shutter, MF Assist, Touch MF Assist, One Shot AF

Exposure/metering
- Exposure modes: Aperture priority, Shutter, Program AE, Manual, iAuto, SCN, Movie, Custom (2)
- Metering modes: Multiple, Center-Weighted, Spot

Flash
- Flash: Built-in flash

Shutter
- Shutter: Electronically-controlled focal-plane shutter / electronic shutter
- Shutter speed range: 60–1/16,000 sec (up to 1/500 sec with mechanical shutter)
- Continuous shooting: 7 RAW images,

Image processing
- White balance: Auto, Daylight, Cloudy, Shade, Incandescent, Flash, White Set 1/2, Color temperature setting

General
- Video recording: AVCHD 1080p (24p, 25p, 50i, 50p fps), MP4 720p (25p, 50p fps), VGA 480p (25p fps)
- LCD screen: 3 inch touch panel (3:2 aspect ratio), 1,036,000 dots
- Battery: 680 mAh 7.2v Lithium-Ion rechargeable battery
- Dimensions: 98.5 mm × 54.9 mm × 30.4 mm (3.88 × 2.16 × 1.20 inches)
- Weight: Approx. 204 g (7.2 oz) (camera body with battery and SD card)

The Panasonic Lumix DMC-GM1 was announced October 2013, as Panasonic's "pocketable", Micro Four Thirds compact mirrorless interchangeable lens camera. It features the same sensor as the GX7, AF detection range of -4 - 18 EV, focus peaking mode, an electronic shutter with speeds ranging from 60 - 1/16,000 sec, and Wi-Fi connectivity.

Panasonic claims the camera is the smallest among interchangeable lens cameras. It lacks some features found in competitors including a viewfinder, in-body image stabilization, a hotshoe, and NFC.

== Variants ==
=== DMC-GM1S ===
A minor revision of GM1 called "DMC-GM1SK" was released in October 2014 exclusively in Japan. It features improvements on image quality and autofocus, adds the "Snap Movie" feature found in the DMC-GM5 and makes the 22 "Creative Filter" feature available in all shooting mode besides "iA mode" and "Scene mode" (Also present on GM5). It was available only in two new color way. (Blue and Brown)

== Special Editions ==
=== Lumix GM1 by colette ===
In February, 2014, Parisian fashion retailer Colette partnered with Panasonic to offer a special edition of the GM1. This limited edition featured alligator embossed leather in Colette's signature blue, black top plate with blacked-out "Lumix" logo, blue shutter and function button on the top, and Colette's logo was featured on the flash instead of Panasonic logo. Only 50 units were made, all units were numbered at the lens mount.

=== Epochs design concept ===
At Photokina 2014, Panasonic partnered with German design studio WertelOberfell to create custom 3D printed parts for the GM1. The Epochs collection features 3 distintive designs inspired by different "design epochs".

- Art nouveau: copper coated, root like structure that adds a grip to the front
- Modernism: geometric hole pattern in silver nickel.
- Digitalism: three-dimensional weave texture that raises at the front left to provide a grip to the camera.

== See also ==
- List of retro-style digital cameras
- List of smallest mirrorless cameras

Preceded by None - New Model	Panasonic Micro Four Thirds System cameras October 2013–present	Succeeded by Panasonic Lumix DMC-GM5

Brand	Form	Class	2008	2009	2010	2011			2012	2013	2014	2015	2016	2017	2018	2019	2020	2021	2022	2023	2024	2025	2026
Olympus	SLR style OM-D	Professional															E-M1X ^{R}						
Olympus	SLR style OM-D	High-end									E-M1			E-M1 II ^{R}			E-M1 III ^{R}						
Olympus	SLR style OM-D	Advanced							E-M5			E-M5 II ^{R}					E-M5 III ^{R}						
Olympus	SLR style OM-D	Mid-range									E-M10		E-M10 II		E-M10 III			E-M10 IV					
Olympus	Rangefinder style PEN	Mid-range		E-P1	E-P2		E-P3				E-P5		PEN-F ^{R}										
Olympus	Rangefinder style PEN	Upper-entry			E-PL1	E-PL2		E-PL3	E-PL5		E-PL6	E-PL7		E-PL8	E-PL9		E-PL10						
Olympus	Rangefinder style PEN	Entry-level					E-PM1		E-PM2														
Olympus	remote													Air									
OM System	SLR style	Professional																	OM-1 ^{R}		OM-1 II ^{R}		
OM System	SLR style	High-end																				OM-3 ^{R}	
OM System	SLR style	Advanced																		OM-5 ^{R}			OM-5 II ^{R}
OM System	PEN	Mid-range																	E-P7				
Panasonic	SLR style	High-end Video													GH5S				GH6 ^{R}			GH7 ^{R}	
Panasonic	SLR style	High-end Photo													G9 ^{R}						G9 II ^{R}		
Panasonic	SLR style	High-end		GH1		GH2			GH3		GH4				GH5				GH5II				
Panasonic	SLR style	Mid-range		G1	G2		G3		G5		G6		G7	G80/G85			G90/G95						
Panasonic	SLR style	Entry-level			G10													G100			G100D		
Panasonic	Rangefinder style	Advanced							GX1		GX7		GX8		GX9								
Panasonic	Rangefinder style	Mid-range									GM1	GM5	GX80/GX85										
Panasonic	Rangefinder style	Entry-level			GF1	GF2	GF3		GF5		GF6	GF7	GF8	GX800/GX850/GF9		GX880/GF10/GF90							
Panasonic	Camcorder	Professional							AG-AF104														
Kodak	Rangefinder style	Entry-level										S-1											
DJI	Drone	.												Zenmuse X5S									
DJI	Drone	.												Zenmuse X5									
YI	Rangefinder style	Entry-level												M1									
Yongnuo	Rangefinder style	Android camera															YN450M		YN455				
Blackmagic Design	Rangefinder style	High-End Video							Cinema Camera														
Blackmagic Design	Rangefinder style	High-End Video									Pocket Cinema Camera					Pocket Cinema Camera 4K							
Blackmagic Design		High-End Video										Micro Cinema Camera									Micro Studio Camera 4K G2		
Z CAM	Cinema	Advanced											E1			E2							
Z CAM	Cinema	Mid-Range																E2-M4					
Z CAM	Cinema	Entry-Level															E2C						
JVC	Camcorder	Professional										GY-LS300											
SVS-Vistek		Industrial							EVO Tracer														
