= Panasonic Lumix DMC-GM5 =

- Panasonic Lumix DMC-GM5 with Olympus M. Zuiko 45mm f/1.8 lens

Overview
- Maker: Panasonic
- Type: Mirrorless

Lens
- Lens mount: Micro Four Thirds

Sensor/medium
- Sensor type: CMOS
- Sensor size: 17.3 x 13 mm (Four Thirds type)
- Sensor maker: Sony
- Maximum resolution: 4592 x 3448 (16 megapixels)
- Film speed: 200-25600 (and 100 in expanded ISO)
- Recording medium: SD, SDHC or SDXC memory card

Focusing
- Focus: Contrast detection
- Focus modes: Multi-area, Center, Selective Single point, Face/Eye detection, Tracking
- Focus areas: 23 focus points

Exposure/metering
- Exposure metering: Multi, Center-weighted, Spot

Shutter
- Shutter: Electronically controlled vertical-run focal plane shutter
- Shutter speeds: 1/16000s to 60s
- Continuous shooting: 5.8 frames per second

Viewfinder
- Viewfinder: Electronic viewfinder 1.166.000 dots
- Viewfinder magnification: 0.92
- Frame coverage: 100%

Image processing
- Image processor: Venus Engine
- White balance: Automatic, cloudy, sun, white balance bracketing, fine-tuning, shade, flash, incandescent light, from 2,500 to 10,000 K, manual

General
- Video recording: AVCHD / MP4; 1920x1080 60p/60i/50p/30p/24p 60/30/24 fps
- LCD screen: 3 inches with 921,000 dots
- Dimensions: 99 x 60 x 36 mm (3.9 x 2.36 x 1.42 inches)
- Weight: 211 g (7 oz) including battery
- Made in: China

The Panasonic Lumix DMC-GM5 is a Micro Four Thirds rangefinder-styled digital mirrorless camera announced by Panasonic on September 15, 2014.

The camera was designed to provide maximum image quality in the smallest possible body.

It is slightly taller than the earlier GM1, as it adds an electronic viewfinder, a hot shoe instead of the integrated flash and moved the rear scroll-wheel for adjusting settings to a more ergonomic position and orientation. However, with a body roughly the same size as a pack of playing cards, it is the smallest mirrorless interchangeable lens camera with an integrated electronic viewfinder.

It has a 16 MP Micro Four Thirds sensor that is roughly 2 times smaller than a Full-frame sensor resulting in a two times crop-factor.

The camera was discontinued in late 2015, and has not been replaced in the Panasonic lineup. It has attained a cult status, and is one of only a very few digital cameras to sell for higher prices second-hand than it did when new.

When sold new, it was usually bundled with a 12-32mm pancake kit lens or a double-lens kit including the 12-32mm and a 35-100mm telephoto zoom. A small 15mm f/1.7 prime lens certified by Leica was also produced to fit the camera.

== See also ==
- List of retro-style digital cameras
- List of smallest mirrorless cameras

Brand	Form	Class	2008	2009	2010	2011			2012	2013	2014	2015	2016	2017	2018	2019	2020	2021	2022	2023	2024	2025	2026
Olympus	SLR style OM-D	Professional															E-M1X ^{R}						
Olympus	SLR style OM-D	High-end									E-M1			E-M1 II ^{R}			E-M1 III ^{R}						
Olympus	SLR style OM-D	Advanced							E-M5			E-M5 II ^{R}					E-M5 III ^{R}						
Olympus	SLR style OM-D	Mid-range									E-M10		E-M10 II		E-M10 III			E-M10 IV					
Olympus	Rangefinder style PEN	Mid-range		E-P1	E-P2		E-P3				E-P5		PEN-F ^{R}										
Olympus	Rangefinder style PEN	Upper-entry			E-PL1	E-PL2		E-PL3	E-PL5		E-PL6	E-PL7		E-PL8	E-PL9		E-PL10						
Olympus	Rangefinder style PEN	Entry-level					E-PM1		E-PM2														
Olympus	remote													Air									
OM System	SLR style	Professional																	OM-1 ^{R}		OM-1 II ^{R}		
OM System	SLR style	High-end																				OM-3 ^{R}	
OM System	SLR style	Advanced																		OM-5 ^{R}			OM-5 II ^{R}
OM System	PEN	Mid-range																	E-P7				
Panasonic	SLR style	High-end Video													GH5S				GH6 ^{R}			GH7 ^{R}	
Panasonic	SLR style	High-end Photo													G9 ^{R}						G9 II ^{R}		
Panasonic	SLR style	High-end		GH1		GH2			GH3		GH4				GH5				GH5II				
Panasonic	SLR style	Mid-range		G1	G2		G3		G5		G6		G7	G80/G85			G90/G95						
Panasonic	SLR style	Entry-level			G10													G100			G100D		
Panasonic	Rangefinder style	Advanced							GX1		GX7		GX8		GX9								
Panasonic	Rangefinder style	Mid-range									GM1	GM5	GX80/GX85										
Panasonic	Rangefinder style	Entry-level			GF1	GF2	GF3		GF5		GF6	GF7	GF8	GX800/GX850/GF9		GX880/GF10/GF90							
Panasonic	Camcorder	Professional							AG-AF104														
Kodak	Rangefinder style	Entry-level										S-1											
DJI	Drone	.												Zenmuse X5S									
DJI	Drone	.												Zenmuse X5									
YI	Rangefinder style	Entry-level												M1									
Yongnuo	Rangefinder style	Android camera															YN450M		YN455				
Blackmagic Design	Rangefinder style	High-End Video							Cinema Camera														
Blackmagic Design	Rangefinder style	High-End Video									Pocket Cinema Camera					Pocket Cinema Camera 4K							
Blackmagic Design		High-End Video										Micro Cinema Camera									Micro Studio Camera 4K G2		
Z CAM	Cinema	Advanced											E1			E2							
Z CAM	Cinema	Mid-Range																E2-M4					
Z CAM	Cinema	Entry-Level															E2C						
JVC	Camcorder	Professional										GY-LS300											
SVS-Vistek		Industrial							EVO Tracer														
