= Nikon D600 =

Digital single-lens reflex camera

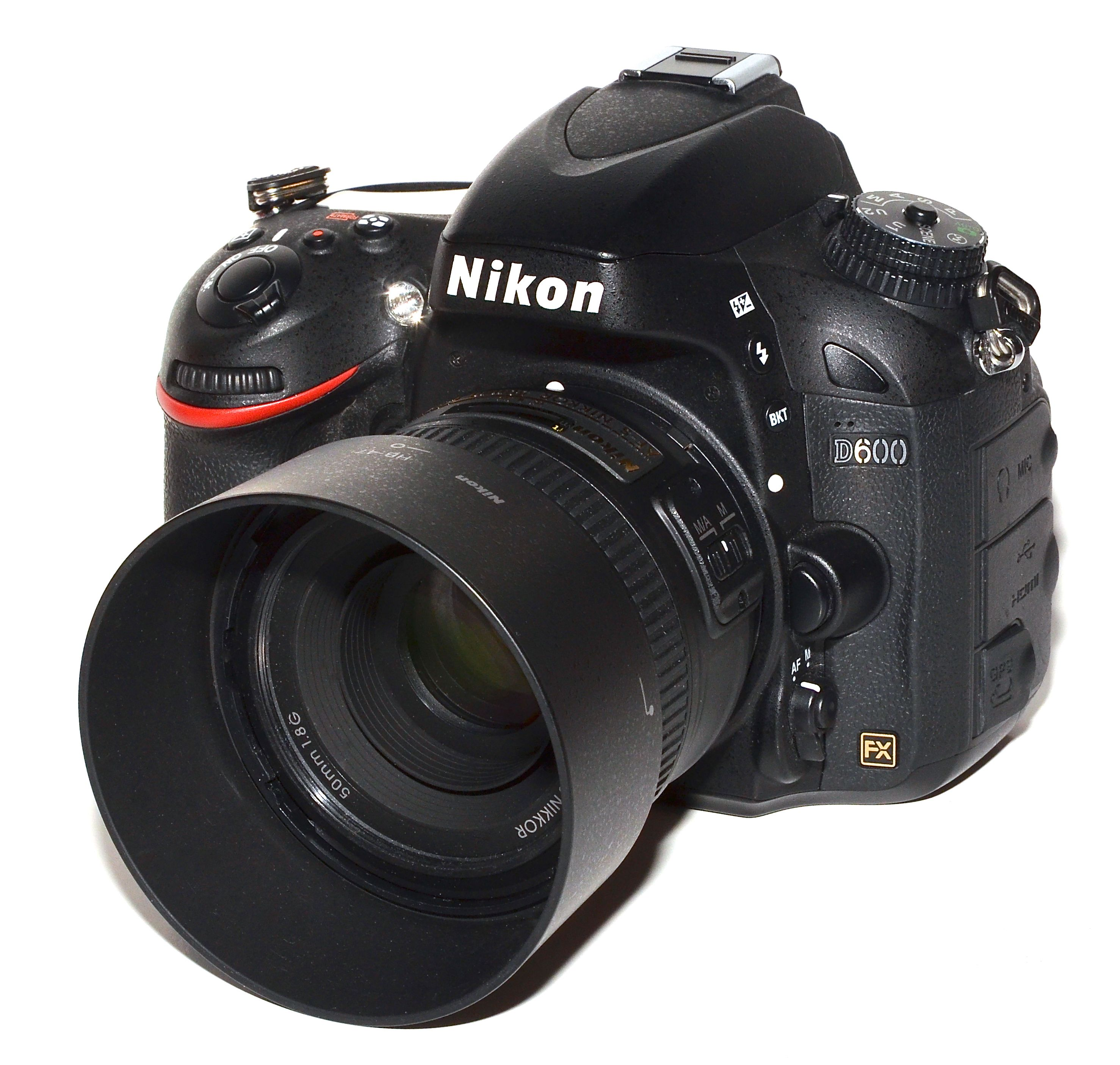

Overview
- Maker: Nikon
- Type: Digital single-lens reflex
- Released: 13 September 2012
- Intro price: US$ 2099 (body only); US$ 2699 (with 24–85 mm kit lens)

Lens
- Lens mount: Nikon F-mount

Sensor/medium
- Sensor type: CMOS
- Sensor size: 35.9 x 24 mm Full Frame FX format, 5.95 μm pixel size
- Maximum resolution: 6016 × 4016 (24.3 megapixels)
- Film speed: 100–6400, extended mode to 50–12800, HI2 mode 25600
- Recording medium: Dual SD, SDHC, SDXC. Also UHS-I and Eye-Fi (WLAN)

Focusing
- Focus modes: Instant single-servo (AF-S); continuous-servo (AF-C); auto AF-S/AF-C selection (AF-A); manual (M)
- Focus areas: 39-point AF/11-point AF

Exposure/metering
- Exposure metering: TTL 3D Color Matrix Metering II metering with a 2,016 pixel RGB sensor
- Metering modes: Matrix metering, center-weighted metering, spot metering

Flash
- Flash: Manual pop-up; guide number 12/39 at ISO 100 (m/ft)
- Flash bracketing: -3 to +3 EV in increments of 1/3, 1/2, 2/3, or 1 EV

Shutter
- Frame rate: 5.5 fps
- Shutter: Electronically controlled vertical-travel focal-plane shutter
- Shutter speed range: 1/4000 to 30 sec, bulb, X-sync at 1/200 sec.

Viewfinder
- Viewfinder: Optical pentaprism, 100% coverage

General
- LCD screen: 3.2 inch (921,600 dots)
- Dimensions: 141×113×82 mm (5.6×4.4×3.2 in)
- Weight: 760 g (27 oz), body only
- Latest firmware: 1.04 / 21 February 2019; 6 years ago
- Made in: Thailand

Chronology
- Successor: Nikon D610

The Nikon D600 is a 24.3-effective-megapixel FX-format full-frame digital SLR camera from Nikon released on September 13, 2012 targeted at professionals and enthusiasts. It began shipping on September 18, 2012; at introduction, its suggested retail price in the U.S. was $2099 (UK £1,955) for the body only and $2699 (UK £2,450) with a 24–85 mm kit lens. The Nikon D600 was given a Gold Award by Digital Photography Review.

According to Nikon the D600 uses the same Expeed 3 as used for the D4 and D800 series, with the same 12-channel sensor interface, featuring a very wide dynamic range which provides the possibility of lightening shadows or darkening overlit areas (high dynamic range imaging, HDR) with one shot when shooting in raw image format.

== Features ==
- 24.3 million effective pixel (24.7 megapixel raw) full-frame (35.9 mm × 24 mm) sensor
- Nikon EXPEED 3 image processor.
- ISO 100 to 6400 in steps of 1/3 or 1/2 EV; can also be set to approx. 0.3, 0.5, 0.7 or 1 EV (ISO 50 equivalent) below ISO 100 or to approx. 0.3, 0.5, 0.7, 1 or 2 EV (ISO 25600 equivalent) above ISO 6400; auto ISO sensitivity control available
- Nikon Multi-CAM 4800 autofocus sensor module with TTL phase detection, fine-tuning, 39 focus points (including nine cross-type sensors)
- Single point, continuous AF, Dynamic AF modes or use 3D tracking to keep pace with a moving subject
- Image formats: NEF (RAW): 12- or 14-bit; lossless compressed or compressed. JPEG: JPEG-Baseline compliant with fine (approx. 1:4), normal (approx. 1:8) or basic (approx. 1:16) compression (Size priority); optimal quality compression available. Also NEF (RAW)+JPEG: Single photograph recorded in both NEF (RAW) and JPEG formats
- Full HD movie mode 1,920 x 1,080 (progressive, 1080p) at 30p(29.97fps)/25p(25fps)/24p(23.976fps), 1,280 x 720 at 60p(59.94fps)/50p/30p/25p. File format: MOV: H.264/MPEG-4 AVC Expeed video processor. Audio format: Linear PCM. Built-in monaural or external stereo microphone; sensitivity adjustable. HDMI HD video out with support of uncompressed video. Maximum film length of approx. 29 min. 59 s (20 min. depending on frame size/rate and movie quality settings)
- Inbuilt time-lapse photography intervalometer
- U1 and U2 user programmable modes to recall custom camera settings
- Dual memory card slots, Slot 2 can be used for overflow or backup storage or for separate storage of copies created using NEF+JPEG; pictures can be copied between cards
- Compatible with SD (Secure Digital) and UHS-I compliant SDHC and SDXC memory cards. Eye-Fi WLAN compatible
- 100% viewfinder coverage in FX, 97% viewfinder coverage in DX mode
- 5.5 fps in CH (continuous high speed), approx. 1 to 5 fps (CL (continuous low speed)
- Built-in high-dynamic-range imaging (HDR) mode
- Live view photography (still images), movie live view (movies)
- Start up to shoot ready in 0.13 seconds
- 0.052 second shutter release
- Magnesium alloy weather-sealed body
- GPS interface for direct geotagging supported by Nikon GP-1

== Reception ==
DxOMark reviewed the D600 sensor image quality and assigned it an overall score of 94, the third-highest-rated camera sensor in its camera sensor database, behind the D800 and its sibling, the Nikon D800E.

According to Digital Photography Review, its build quality and user interface are between the D7000 and the high-end full-frame D800. It includes almost all of the video capabilities of the D800, except that the D600 body cannot adjust aperture during video recording.

== Service advisories and release of successor (D610) ==
Following complaints of dust accumulation on the D600's sensor, in late November 2012, a user created a timelapse video as evidence that was then widely reported in photography-related publications. Three months later, Nikon responded with a service advisory that referred to "the natural accumulation of dust", and advised users to perform "manual cleaning using a blower bulb" before contacting a service center.

On October 8, 2013, the Nikon D610 was announced, a direct successor of the D600, and the D600 was shortly thereafter noted as having been discontinued. The D610 has been described as "a very minor refresh", but does include a new shutter unit. It was speculated that the D610 was released solely to address the oil and dust issues of the D600.

In January 2014, the website Nikon Rumors reported that some users were receiving D610 units back in response to sending their D600 units in for repair, and Nikon responded by stating this was done on a case-by-case basis. On February 26, Nikon issued another service advisory according to which they will perform full inspection, cleaning, and replacement of the shutter unit for all D600 units sent in, regardless of warranty status, and free of charge. On March 18, the Chinese government ordered Nikon to stop selling the D600, forcing Nikon to recall all remaining units from dealers. Ten days later, Nikon published a third advisory noting that "Nikon will replace [...] with a new D600 or an equivalent model" any cameras "upon which the above service has been performed several times" "if a number of multiple (sic) granular black spots are still noticeable". On June 30, it was revealed Nikon had allocated 1.8 billion Yen (17.6 million USD) for the cost of these repairs and replacements over the past financial year.

Sensor	Class	'01	'02	'03	'04	'05	'06	'07	'08	'09	'10	'11	'12	'13	'14	'15	'16	'17	'18	'19	'20	'21	'22	'23	'24	'25
FX (Full-frame)	Flagship									D3X ^{−P}																
FX (Full-frame)	Flagship								D3 ^{−P}		D3S ^{−P}		D4		D4S		D5^{T}					D6^{T}				
FX (Full-frame)	Professional									D700 ^{−P}			D800/D800E			D810/D810A			D850 ^{AT}							
FX (Full-frame)	Enthusiast														Df											
FX (Full-frame)	Enthusiast															D750 ^{A}					D780 ^{AT}					
FX (Full-frame)	Enthusiast													D600	D610											
DX (APS-C)	Flagship	D1X^{−E}				D2X^{−E}		D2Xs^{−E}																		
DX (APS-C)	Flagship	D1H ^{−E}			D2H^{−E}	D2Hs^{−E}																				
DX (APS-C)	Professional		D100^{−E}				D200^{−E}		D300^{−P}		D300S^{−P}						D500 ^{AT}									
DX (APS-C)	Enthusiast				D70^{−E}		D70s^{−E}	D80^{−E}		D90^{−E}		D7000 ^{−P}			D7100	D7200			D7500 ^{AT}							
DX (APS-C)	Upper-entry						D50^{−E}	D40X^{−E*}	D60^{−E*}		D5000^{A−P*}		D5100^{A−P*}	D5200^{A−P*}	D5300^{A*}	D5500^{AT*}		D5600 ^{AT*}								
DX (APS-C)	Entry-level							D40^{−E*}			D3000^{−E*}	D3100^{−P*}		D3200^{−P*}	D3300^{*}			D3400^{*}		D3500^{*}						
Early models		Nikon SVC (prototype; 1986); Nikon QV-1000C (1988); Nikon NASA F4 (1991); Nikon E2/E2S (1995); Nikon E2N/E2NS (1996); Nikon E3/E3S (1998); D1 (1999)																								
Sensor	Class																									
Sensor	Class	'01	'02	'03	'04	'05	'06	'07	'08	'09	'10	'11	'12	'13	'14	'15	'16	'17	'18	'19	'20	'21	'22	'23	'24	'25
