= Kodak EasyShare P880 =

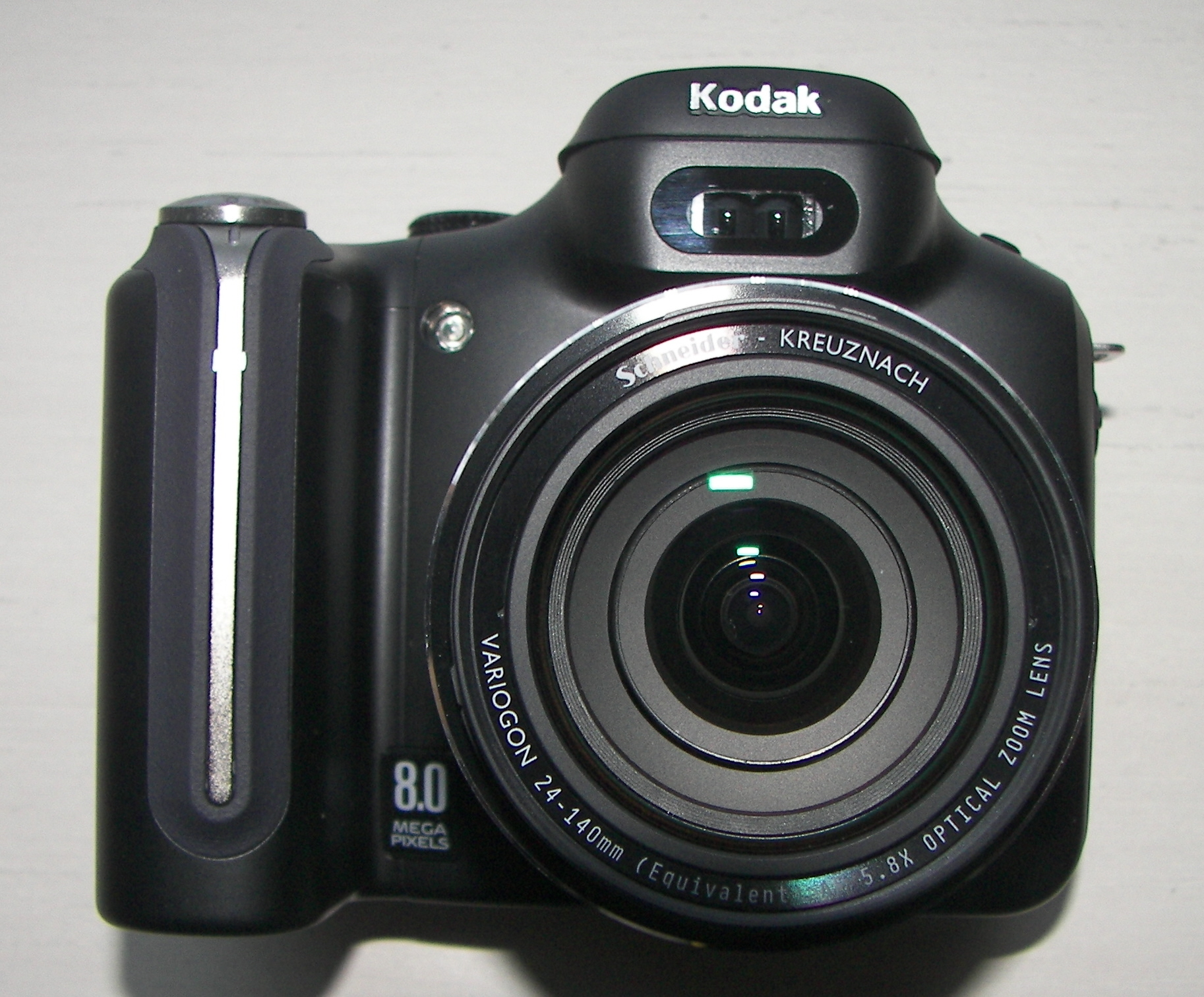
Kodak EasyShare P880 front view

The EasyShare P880 is a bridge digital camera from Kodak introduced on August 2, 2005, as part of Performance series. Its siblings are the P850 and the P712. The P880 possesses the largest optical sensor of all three models, with a size of 1/1.8 inches. Distinguishing features include wide-angle coverage of 24 mm (35 mm equivalent), an on screen histogram display, and manual focus-by-wire. In terms of the Kodak product line and price the Performance series are the most sophisticated EasyShare cameras, just below the considerably more expensive Kodak professional DCS pro SLR digital cameras that were discontinued in May 2005.

Kodak P850 with zoom lens motion detail
