= Nikon D610 =

Digital single-lens reflex camera

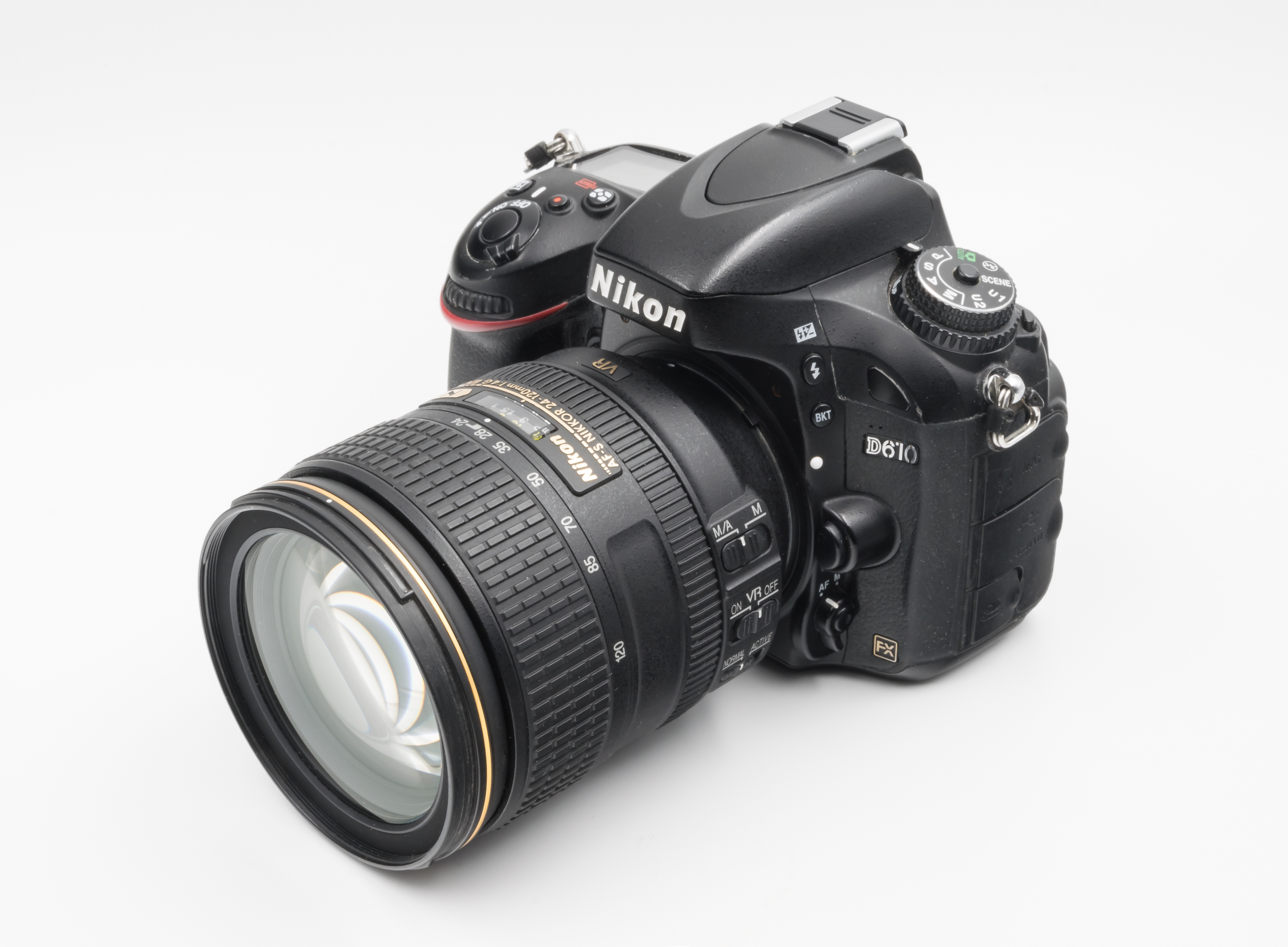

Overview
- Maker: Nikon
- Type: Digital single-lens reflex camera
- Released: 8 October 2013

Lens
- Lens mount: Nikon F

Sensor/medium
- Sensor type: CMOS
- Sensor size: 35.9 × 24 mm (full frame type)
- Sensor maker: Sony
- Maximum resolution: 6016 × 4016 pixels (24 megapixels)
- Film speed: 50–25600
- Recording medium: SD, SDHC, or SDXC memory cards (2 slots)

Focusing
- Focus areas: 39 focus points

Shutter
- Shutter speeds: 1/4000 s to 30 s
- Continuous shooting: 6 frames per second

Viewfinder
- Viewfinder magnification: 0.7
- Frame coverage: 100%

Image processing
- Image processor: Expeed 3
- White balance: Yes

General
- LCD screen: 3.2 inches with 921,000 dots
- Dimensions: 141 × 113 × 82 mm (5.55 × 4.45 × 3.23 inches)
- Weight: 850 g (30 oz) including battery
- Latest firmware: 1.04 / 21 February 2019; 6 years ago

Chronology
- Predecessor: Nikon D600

The Nikon D610 is a full-frame DSLR camera announced by Nikon on October 8, 2013. It improves on its predecessor, the Nikon D600, with a new shutter unit that supports a quiet mode at 3 frames per second and a normal continuous mode at a slightly improved 6 frames per second, as well as improved white balance. The previous model had problems that were traced to its shutter unit.

Sensor	Class	'01	'02	'03	'04	'05	'06	'07	'08	'09	'10	'11	'12	'13	'14	'15	'16	'17	'18	'19	'20	'21	'22	'23	'24	'25	'26
FX (Full-frame)	Flagship									D3X ^{−P}																	
FX (Full-frame)	Flagship								D3 ^{−P}		D3S ^{−P}		D4		D4S		D5^{T}					D6^{T}					
FX (Full-frame)	Professional									D700 ^{−P}			D800/D800E			D810/D810A			D850 ^{AT}								
FX (Full-frame)	Enthusiast														Df												
FX (Full-frame)	Enthusiast															D750 ^{A}					D780 ^{AT}						
FX (Full-frame)	Enthusiast													D600	D610												
DX (APS-C)	Flagship	D1X^{−E}				D2X^{−E}		D2Xs^{−E}																			
DX (APS-C)	Flagship	D1H ^{−E}			D2H^{−E}	D2Hs^{−E}																					
DX (APS-C)	Professional		D100^{−E}				D200^{−E}		D300^{−P}		D300S^{−P}						D500 ^{AT}										
DX (APS-C)	Enthusiast				D70^{−E}		D70s^{−E}	D80^{−E}		D90^{−E}		D7000 ^{−P}			D7100	D7200			D7500 ^{AT}								
DX (APS-C)	Upper-entry						D50^{−E}	D40X^{−E*}	D60^{−E*}		D5000^{A−P*}		D5100^{A−P*}	D5200^{A−P*}	D5300^{A*}	D5500^{AT*}		D5600 ^{AT*}									
DX (APS-C)	Entry-level							D40^{−E*}			D3000^{−E*}	D3100^{−P*}		D3200^{−P*}	D3300^{*}			D3400^{*}		D3500^{*}							
Early models		Nikon SVC (prototype; 1986); Nikon QV-1000C (1988); Nikon NASA F4 (1991); Nikon E2/E2S (1995); Nikon E2N/E2NS (1996); Nikon E3/E3S (1998); D1 (1999)																									
Sensor	Class																										
Sensor	Class	'01	'02	'03	'04	'05	'06	'07	'08	'09	'10	'11	'12	'13	'14	'15	'16	'17	'18	'19	'20	'21	'22	'23	'24	'25	'26
