= Nikon Coolpix 5000 =

Digital camera model

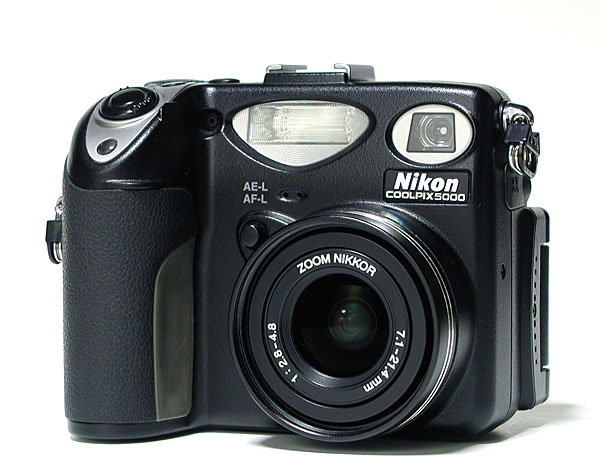
Coolpix 5000

The Coolpix 5000 (also known as the CP5000 and E5000 in non-U.S. markets) is a 5-megapixel digital camera from Nikon's Coolpix series. It was announced September 18, 2001 for an MSRP of US$1099 and featured several unique features such as a fully articulating 1.8-inch (46 mm) color LCD monitor that tilted and swung to virtually any angle to allow for easier framing of subjects and included audio with its movie mode function that captured 60 seconds of QuickTime video. The Coolpix 5000 is currently discontinued.
