= Samsung NX series =

Series of interchangeable-lens cameras

The Samsung NX series was a series of APS-C mirrorless interchangeable-lens cameras (with the exception of Samsung NX mini that sports a 1-inch sensor) with Samsung NX lens mounts from Samsung Electronics, introduced in 2010.

The APS-C image sensors have a 1.54× crop factor. Optical image stabilization is featured on some of the lenses, indicated by an "OIS" marking. Automatic focusing on NX lenses is handled by a dedicated electric motor built into the lens.

== Cameras ==
- Samsung NX10 (released January 2010, worldwide)
- Samsung NX5 (released June 2010, for UK, Germany, Nordics and South Korea market only)
- Samsung NX100 (released September 2010, worldwide)
- Samsung NX11 (released December 2010, worldwide)
- Samsung NX200 (released September 2011, worldwide)
- Samsung NX20 (released April 2012)
- Samsung NX210 (released April 2012)
- Samsung NX1000 (released April 2012)
- Samsung NX300 (released January 2013)
- Samsung NX1100 (released April 2013)
- Samsung NX2000 (released May 2013)
- Samsung Galaxy NX (released June 2013 with Android interface)
- Samsung NX300M (released October 2013)
- Samsung NX30 (released January 2014)
- Samsung NX mini (released April 2014)
- Samsung NX3000 (released June 2014), a compromise of Samsung NX mini and the bigger Samsung NX300
- Samsung NX1 (released November 2014)
- Samsung NX500 (released February 2015)
- Samsung NX3300 (announced February 2015)

== Samsung NX-mount ==
With a diameter of 42mm the lens mount has a comparatively large flange focal distance of 25.5 mm – the 35 mm full-frame format Leica M mount is only 2 mm larger (despite this, M mount lenses cannot be mounted on NX camera with preserving infinity focus.)

== NX-mount lenses ==
As of February 2015, there are 15 Samsung lenses available. As of February 2015, the NX-mount is supported by at least one additional manufacturer: Samyang Optics, which only delivers lenses without autofocus / image stabilization.

== Current status of NX series ==
An official announcement from Samsung has never emerged, detailing the current status of the NX brand. It is widely known that Samsung pulled their camera business out of all major markets. This leads to speculation that NX has been abandoned by Samsung. No future development is anticipated.

All engineering imaging resources that were previously assigned to the Samsung NX line of cameras remain aligned with the Samsung mobile camera division.

Level	2010		2011	2012	2013		2014	2015
High-End								NX1
Advanced	NX10		NX11	NX20			NX30	
Mid-range		NX100	NX200	NX210	NX300		NX300M	NX500
Mid-range							Galaxy NX	
Upper-entry						NX2000	NX3000	NX3300
Entry-level	NX5			NX1000	NX1100			
Compact-entry							NX mini	NX mini 2
