= Samsung NX1100 =

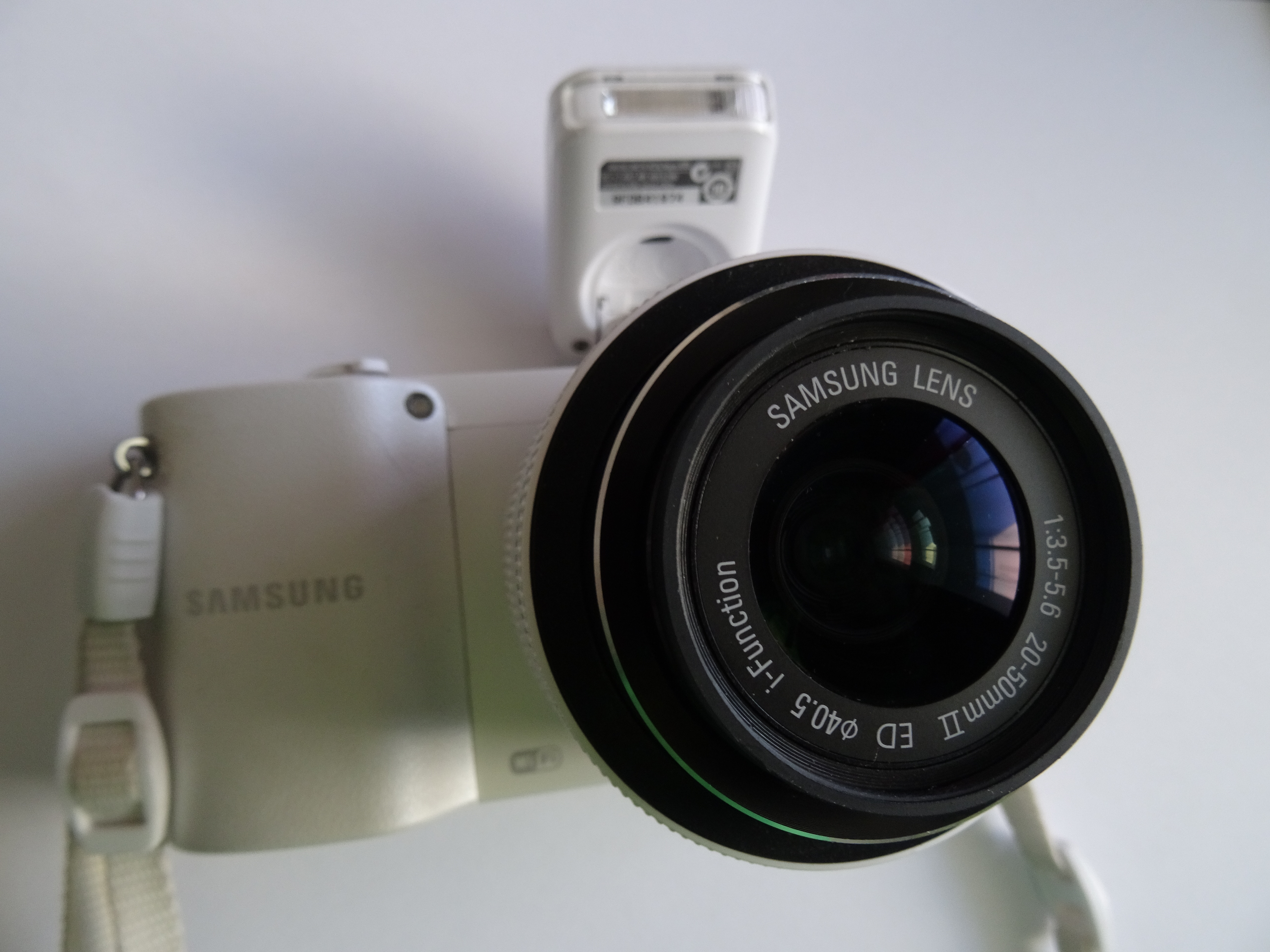

Overview
- Maker: Samsung
- Type: Mirrorless interchangeable lens camera

Lens
- Lens: Type 20-50mm F/3.5-5.6 ED Lens (White); EX-S2050BNW/US; Included Lens EX-S2050BNW/US (Samsung NX-mount)

Sensor/medium
- Sensor: Effective Pixel Approx. 20.3 Mega-pixels; Total PixelApprox. 21.6 Mega-pixels; Image Sensor Type CMOS
- Maximum resolution: 5,472 × 3,648 (20.3 Mega-pixels)
- Storage media: Secure Digital, SD, SDHC, SDXC

Focusing
- Focus modes: Autofocus (Single, Continuous), Manual Focus
- Focus areas: Contrast-detect 1 Point AF (free selection), 15-Area-Focusing (normal) / 35-area-focusing (close up), Face Detection (max 10 faces)

Exposure/metering
- Exposure metering: ISO Equivalent Auto, 100, 200, 400, 800, 1600, 3200, 6400, 12800 (1 or 1/3EV step); AUTO ISO Upper Level is Selectable. (Up to ISO3200); Metering System ? TTL 221(17x13) Block Segment; Metering : Multi, Center-weighted, Spot Metering Range : EV 0-18 (ISO 100 · 30mm, F2)

Flash
- Flash: external hotshoe only

Shutter
- Shutter: Electronically controlled vertical-run focal plane shutter
- Shutter speed range: 1/4000 to 30 sec. and bulb (up to 4 minutes)
- Continuous shooting: 8 fps up to 11 JPEG or 8 RAW frames, 3 fps up to 15 frames (JPEG)

Viewfinder
- Viewfinder: LCD only

Image processing
- WB bracketing: Yes

General
- LCD screen: TFT LCD; Resolution 8VGA ( 640X40 ) 921k dots
- Battery: BP1030 1030 mAh
- AV port(s): NTSC, PAL, HDMI 1.4a (1080i, 720p, 576p / 480p)
- Data port: USB 2.0 (micro USB)
- Dimensions: 4.59" x 2.46" x 1.44" (excluding the projecting parts)
- Weight: Without battery and card 0.48 lb

The Samsung NX1100 is a digital compact camera produced and marketed by Samsung since April 2013 as an entry-level camera with interchangeable lenses. It is a 20.3-megapixel mirrorless interchangeable lens camera using the Samsung NX-mount.

The NX1100 is comparable in weight and size with cameras such as the Sony NEX, Nikon 1 and the Micro Four Thirds series of cameras.

The NX1100 includes the i-Function lens control system and built-in WiFi for connection to online services such as email and social networking. The NX1100 is nearly identical to the NX1000 model.

No way to use as a webcam.

== Camera Gallery ==
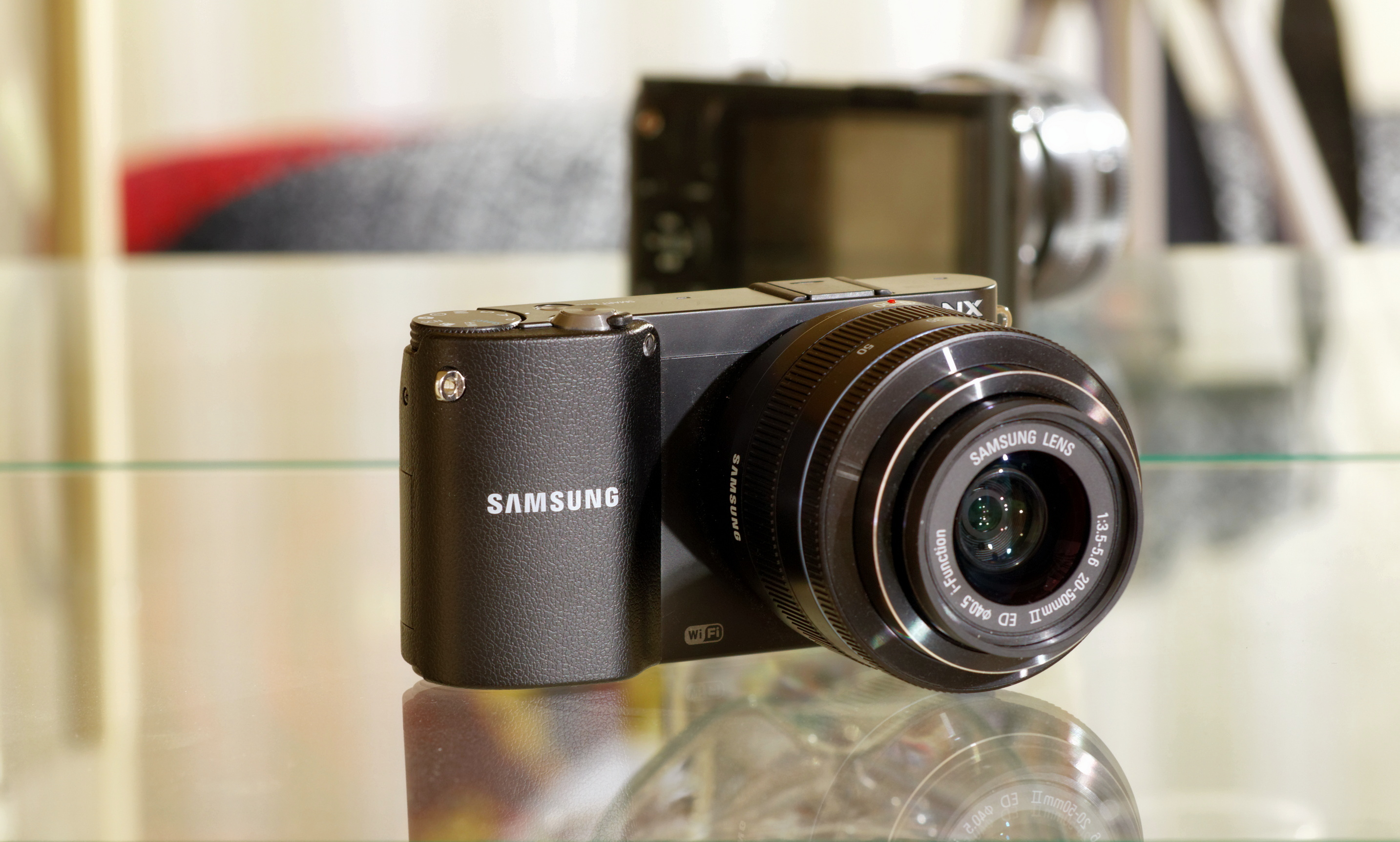

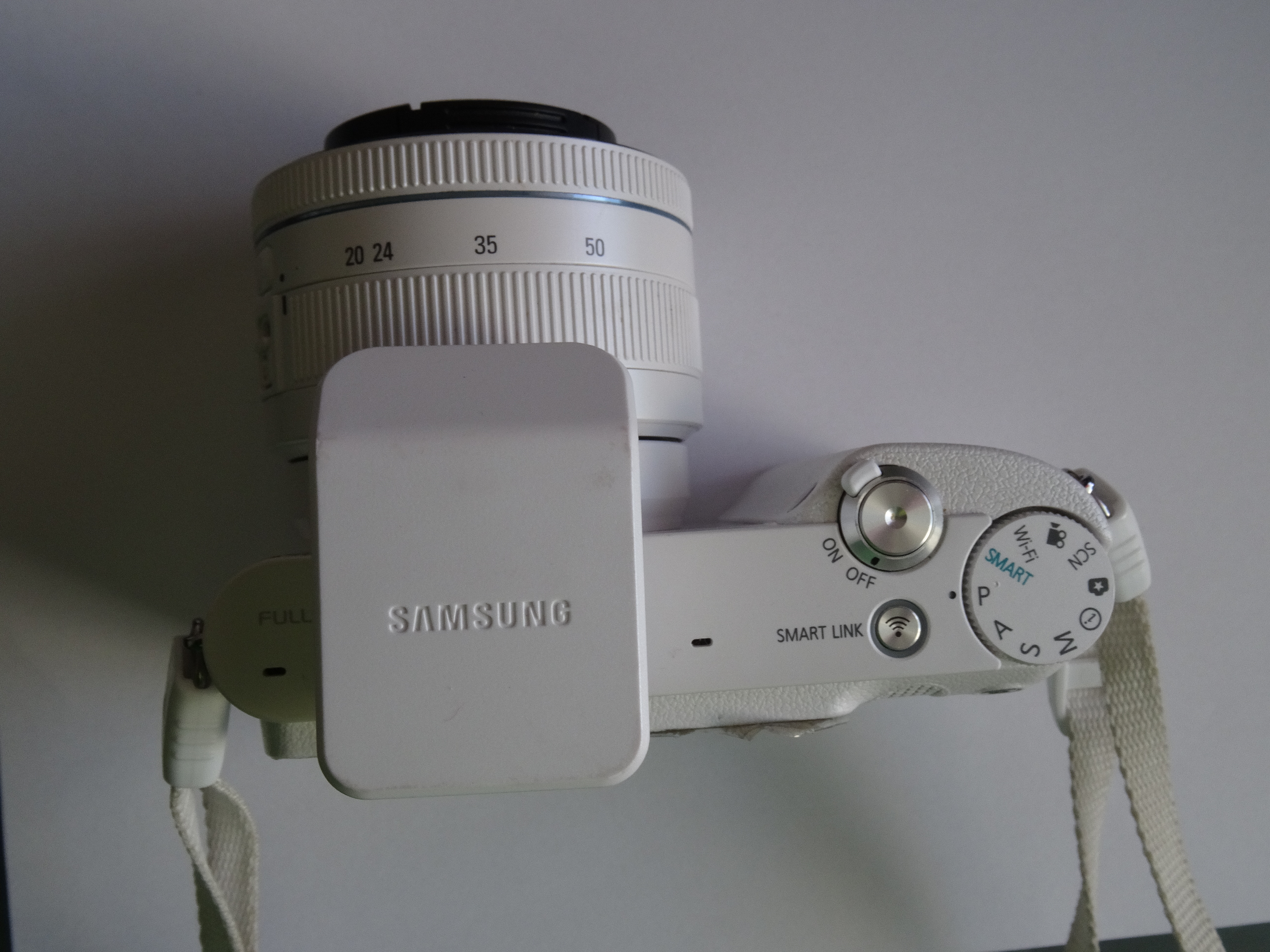

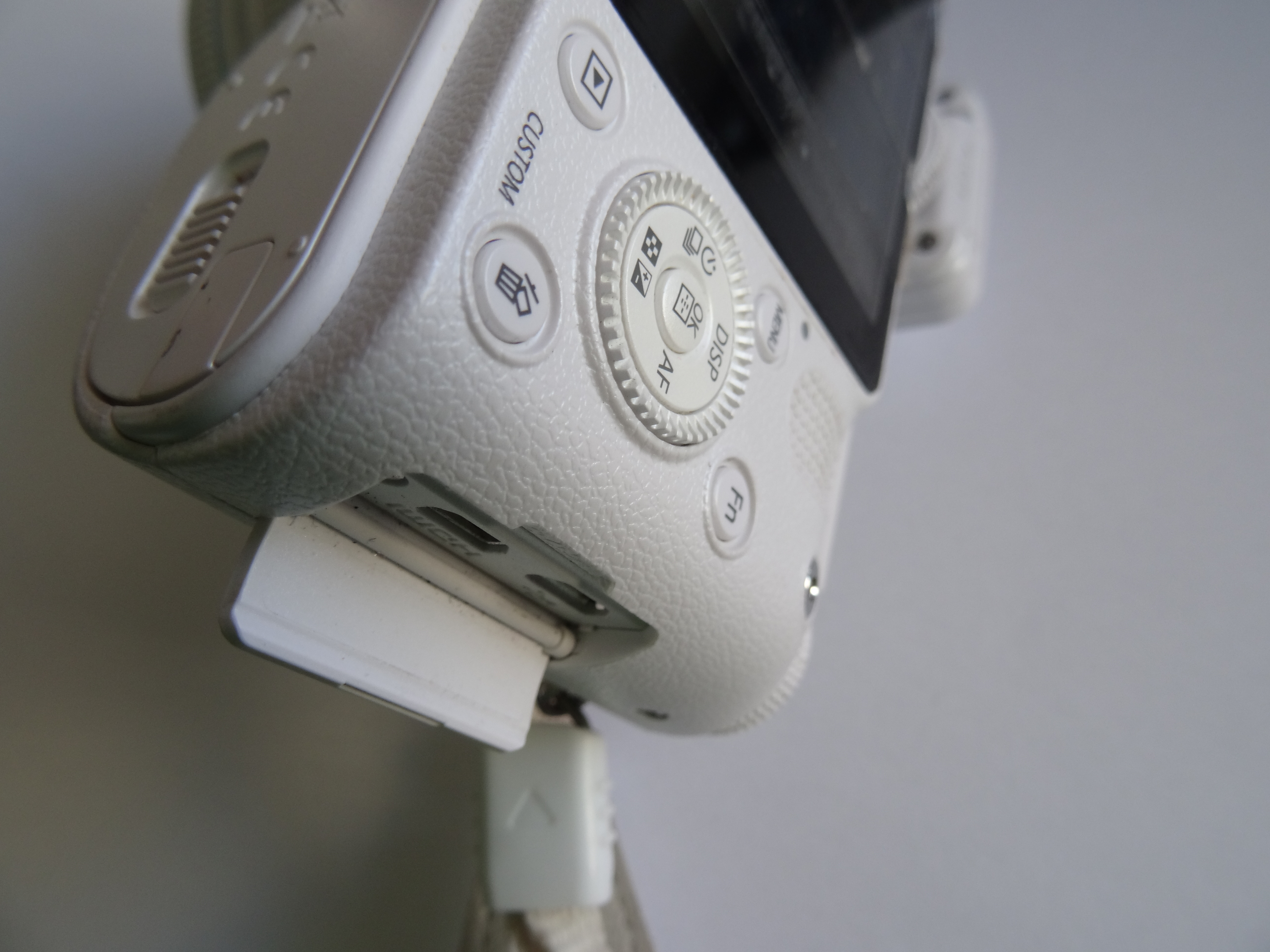

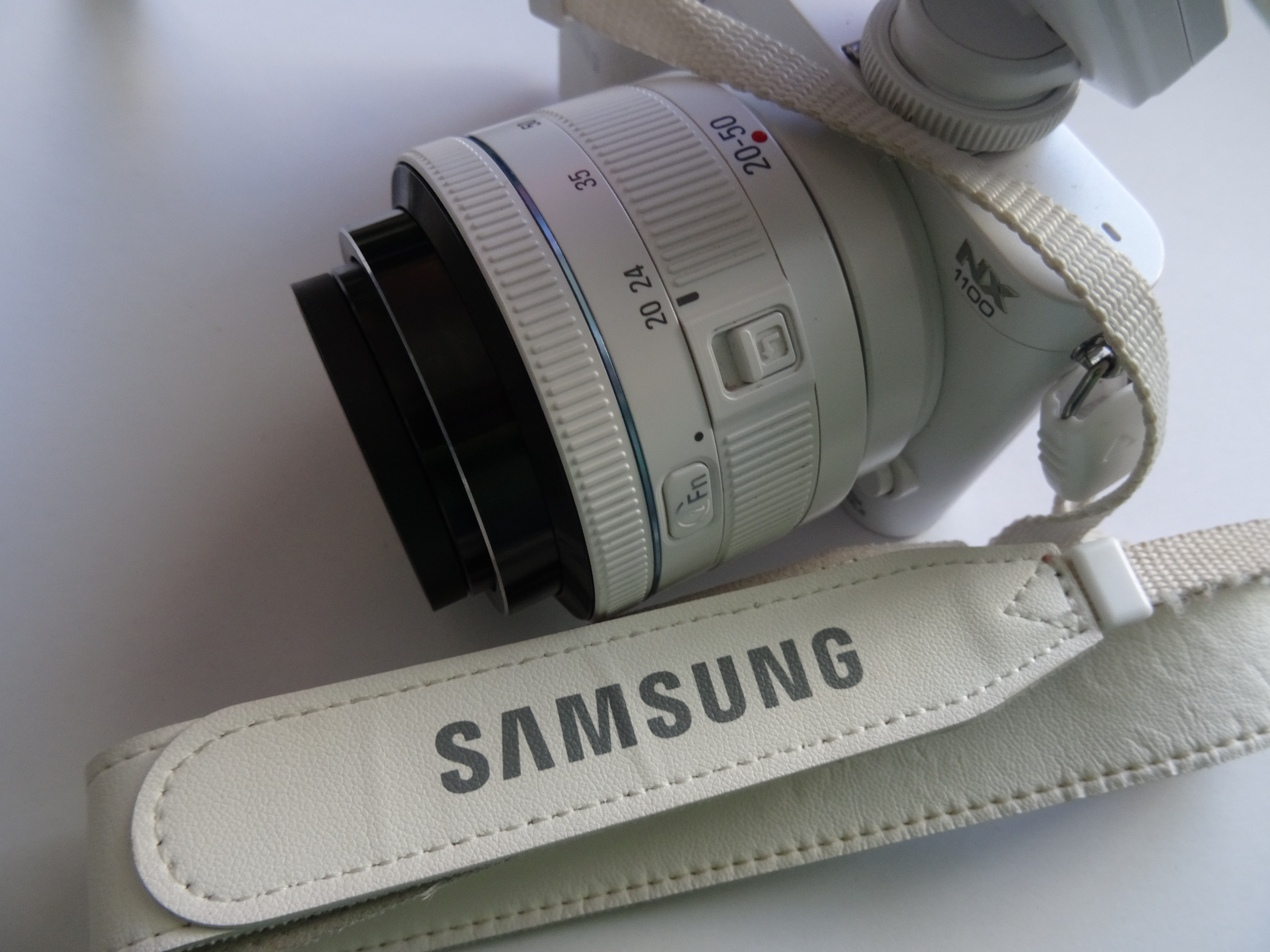

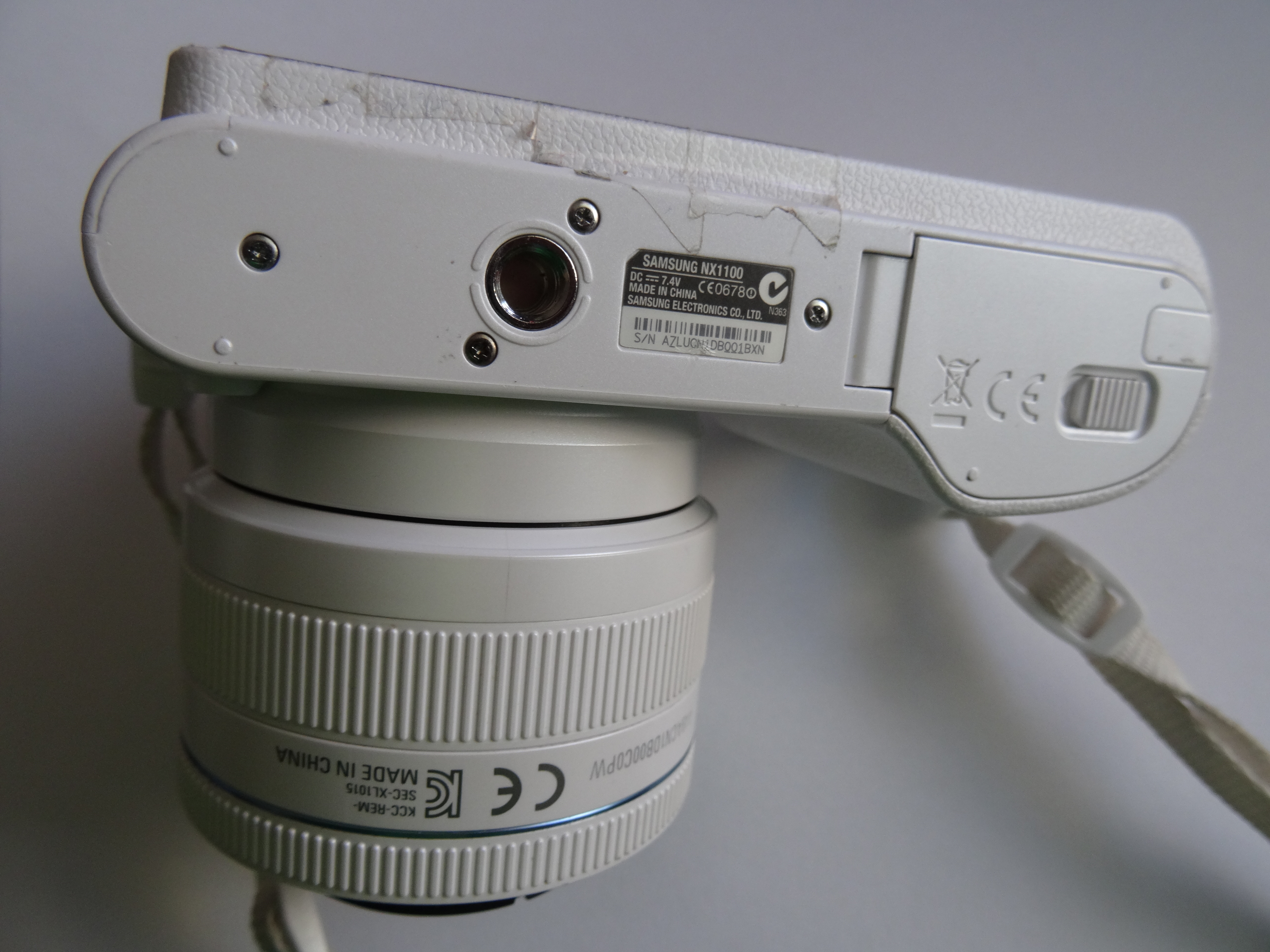

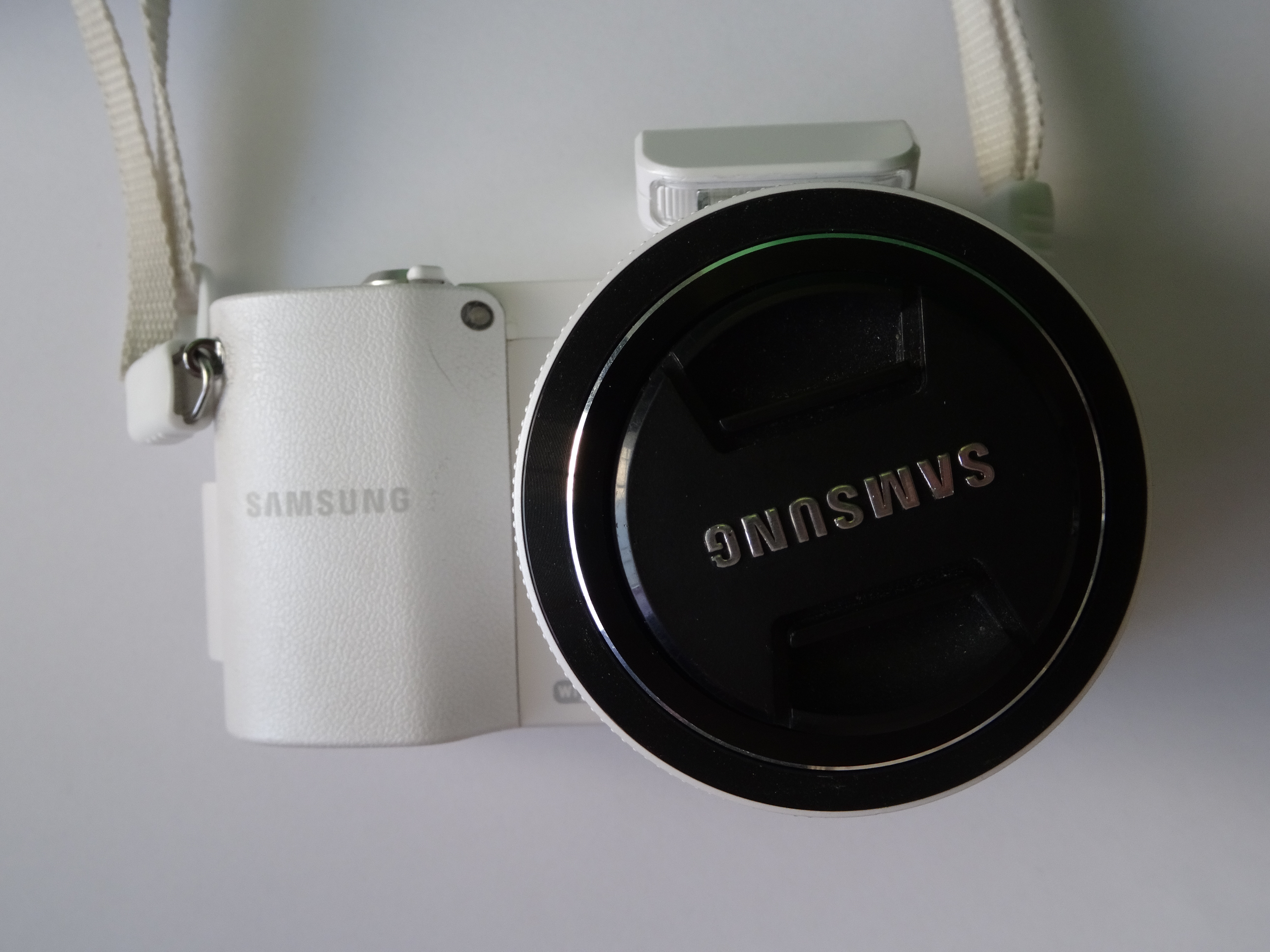

=== Examples ===
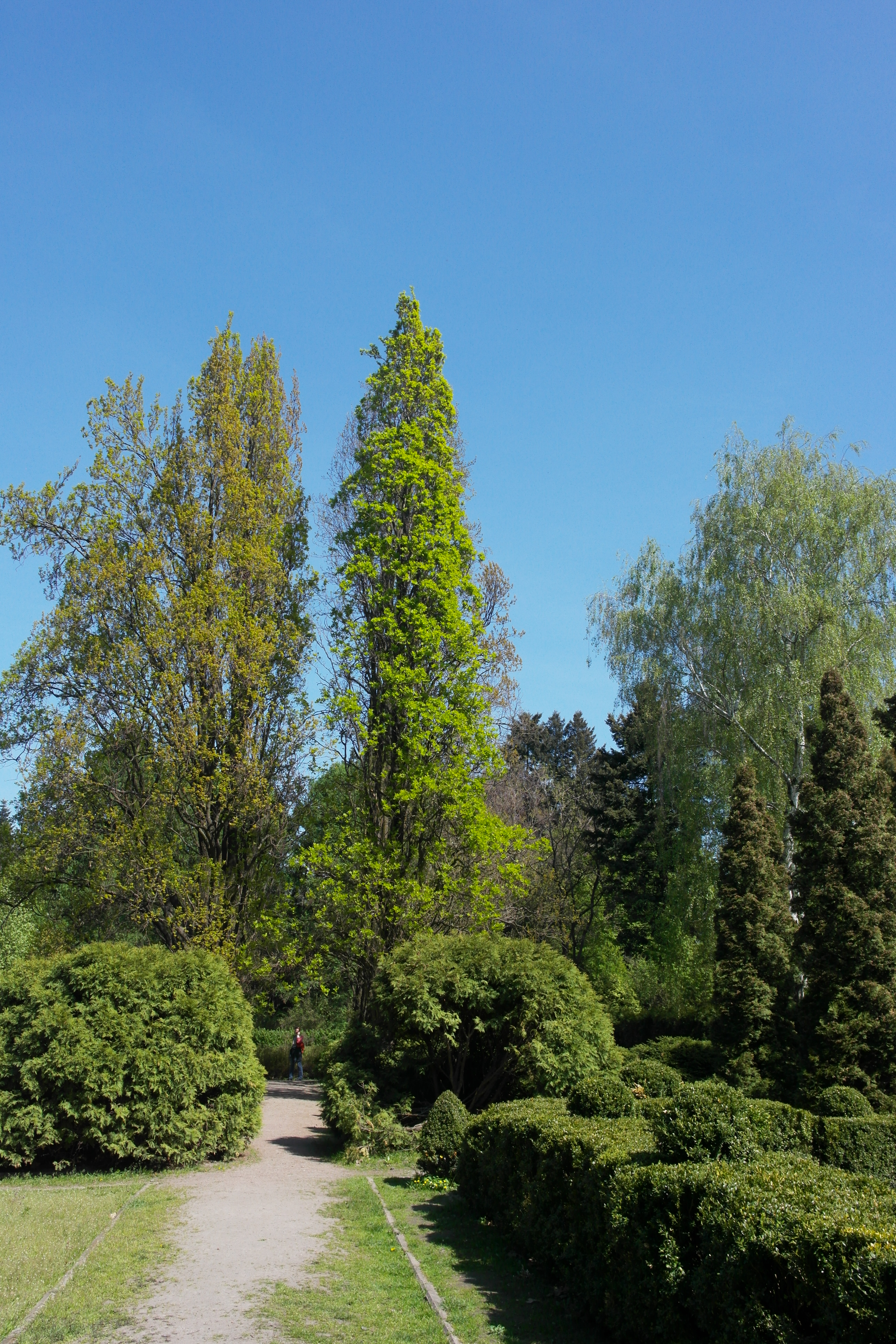

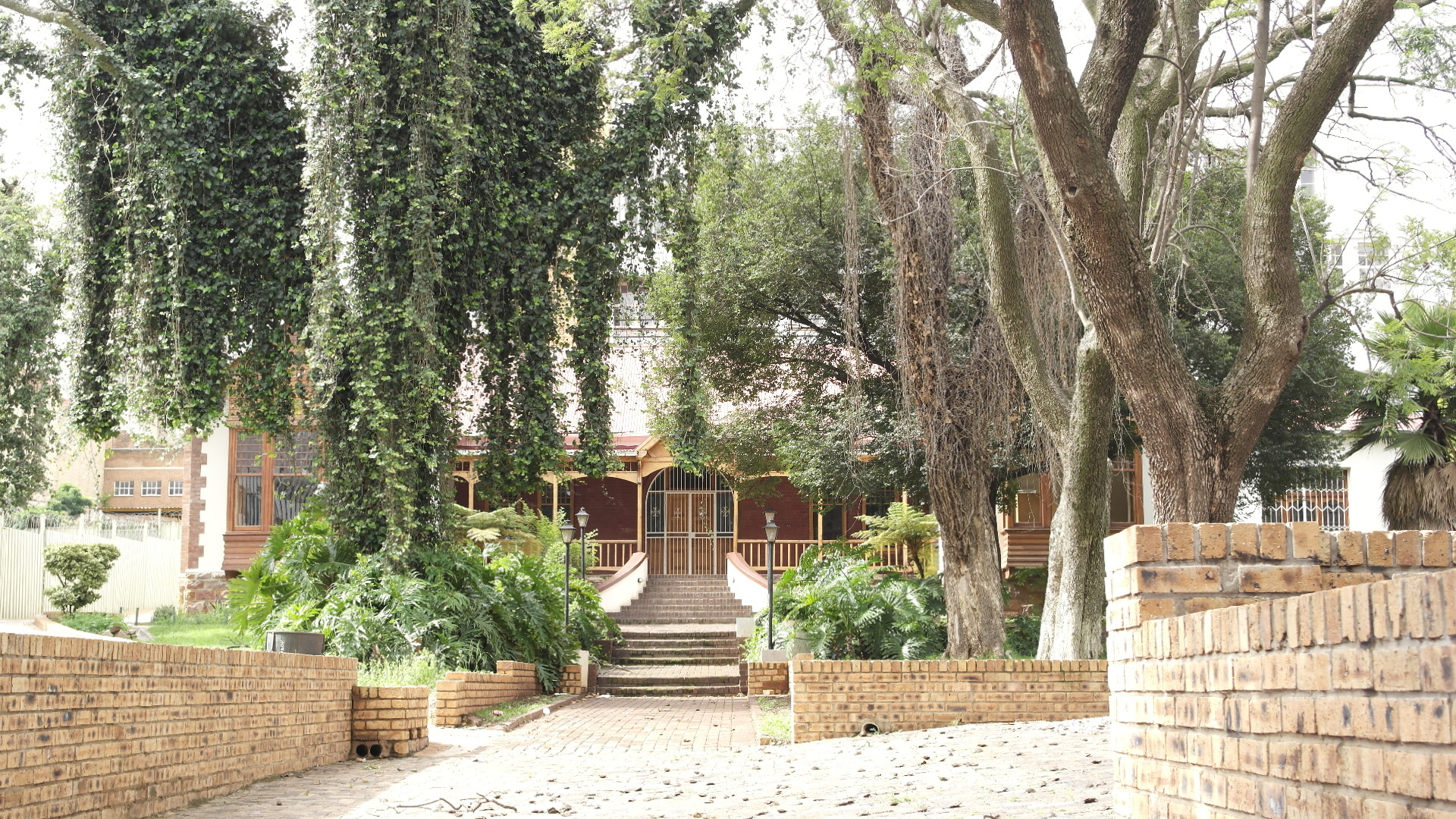

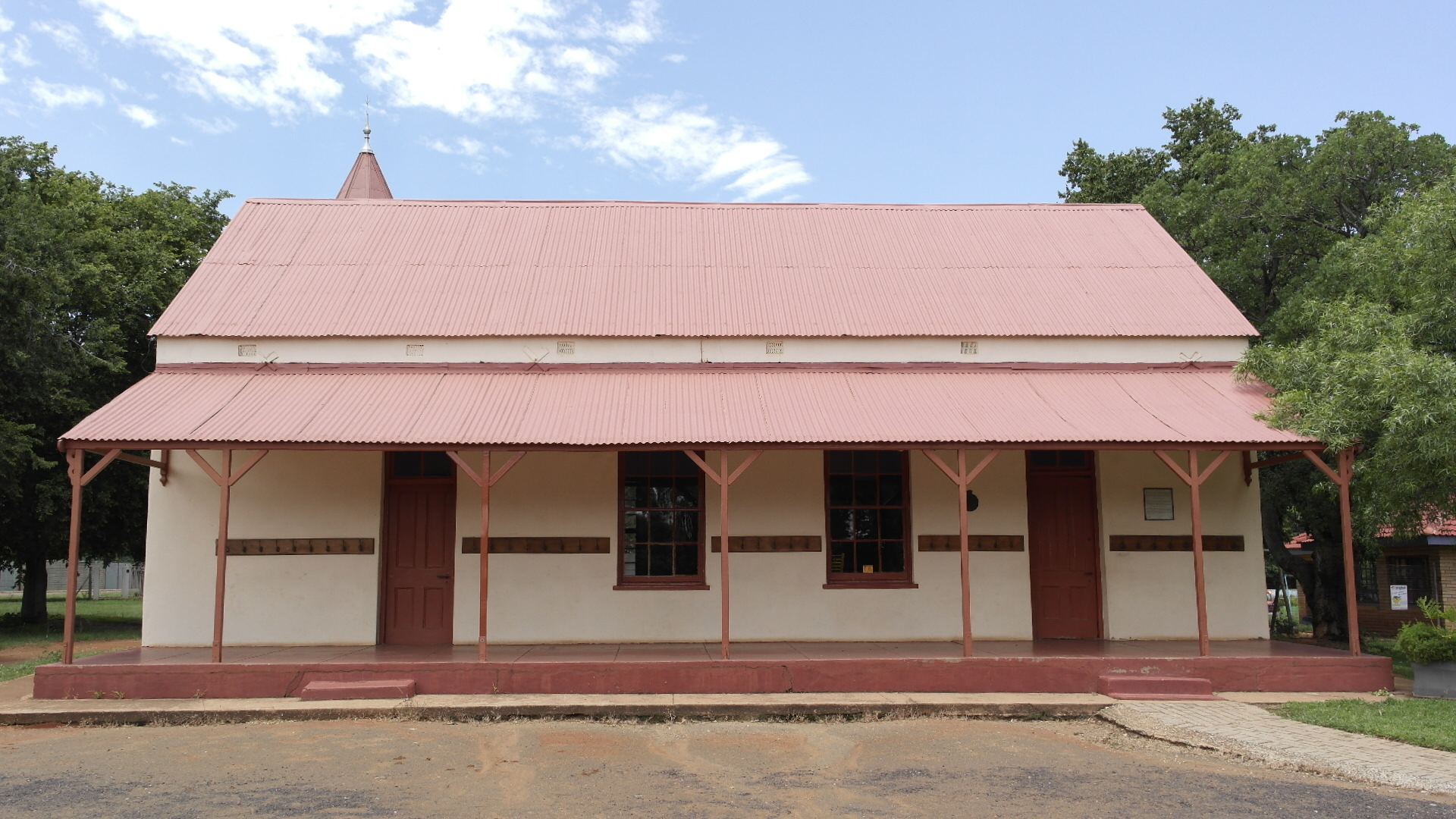

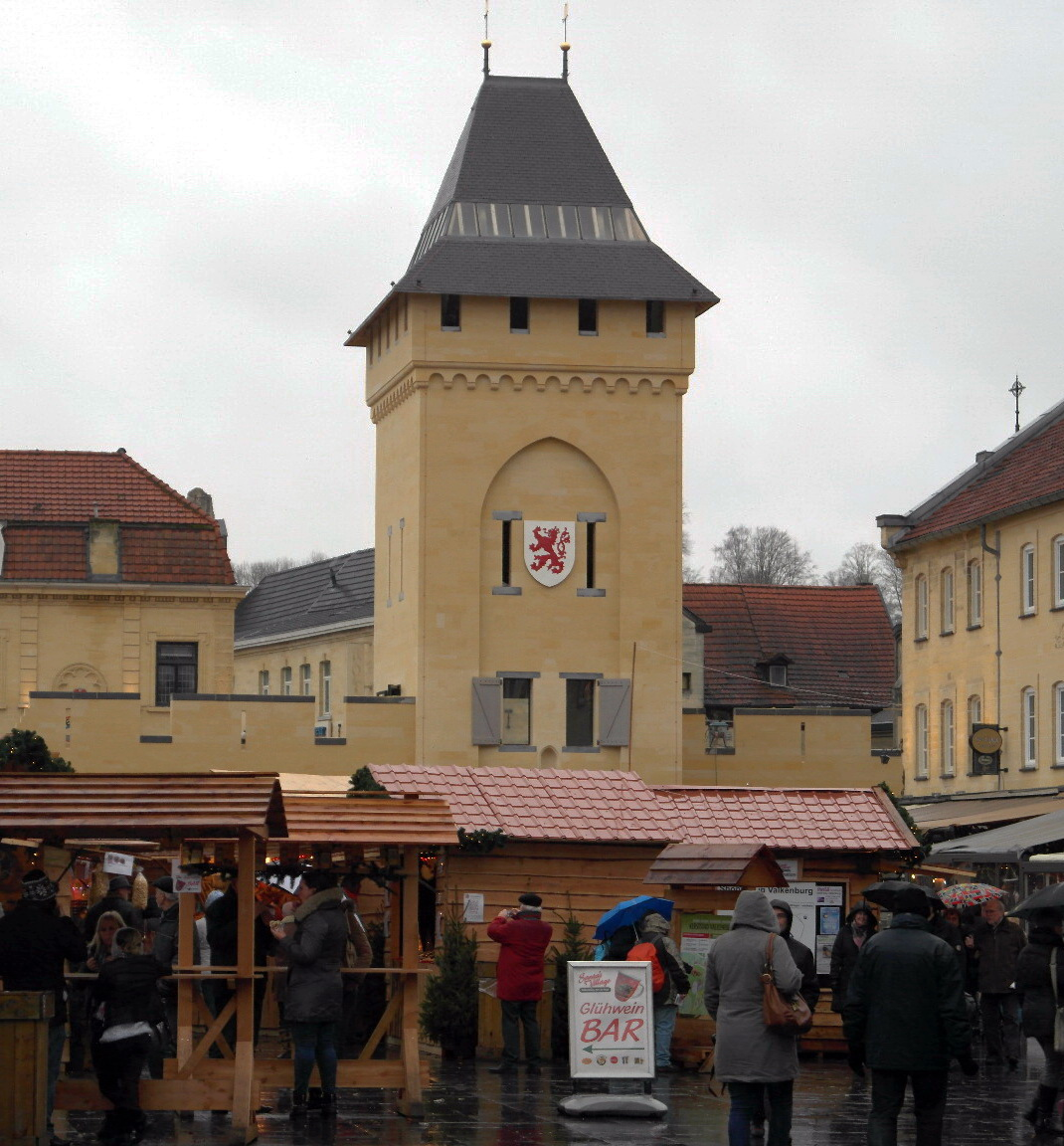

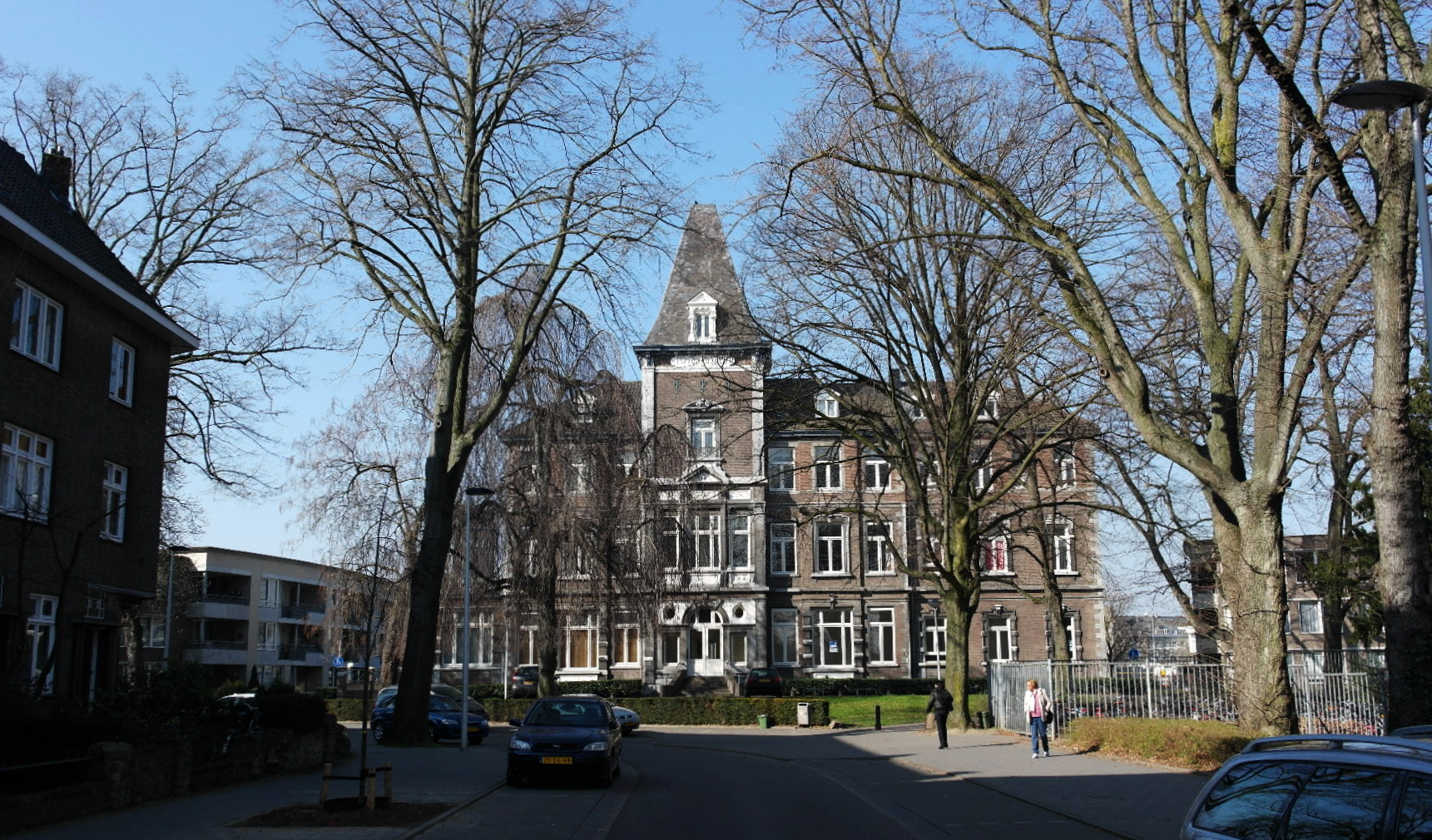

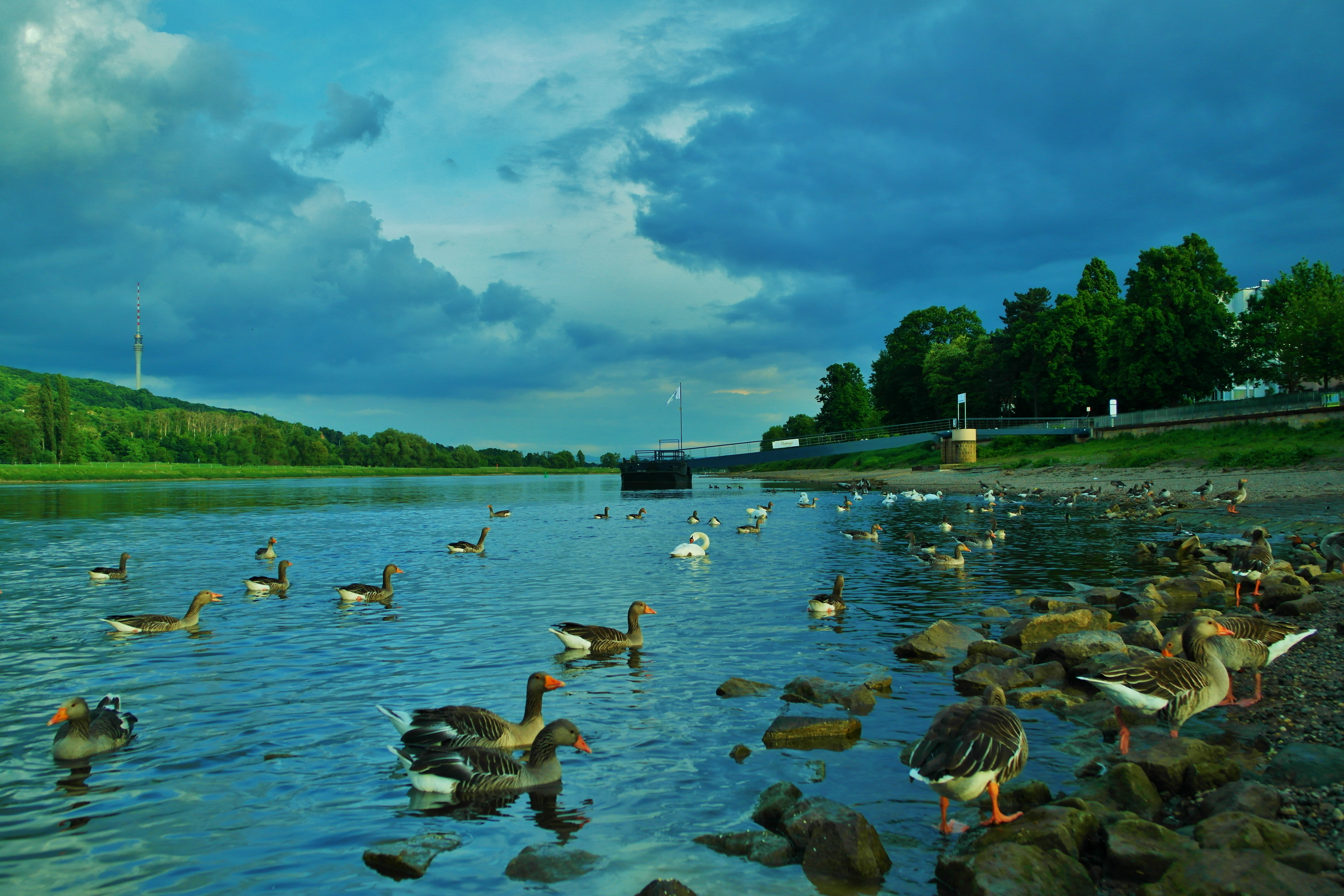

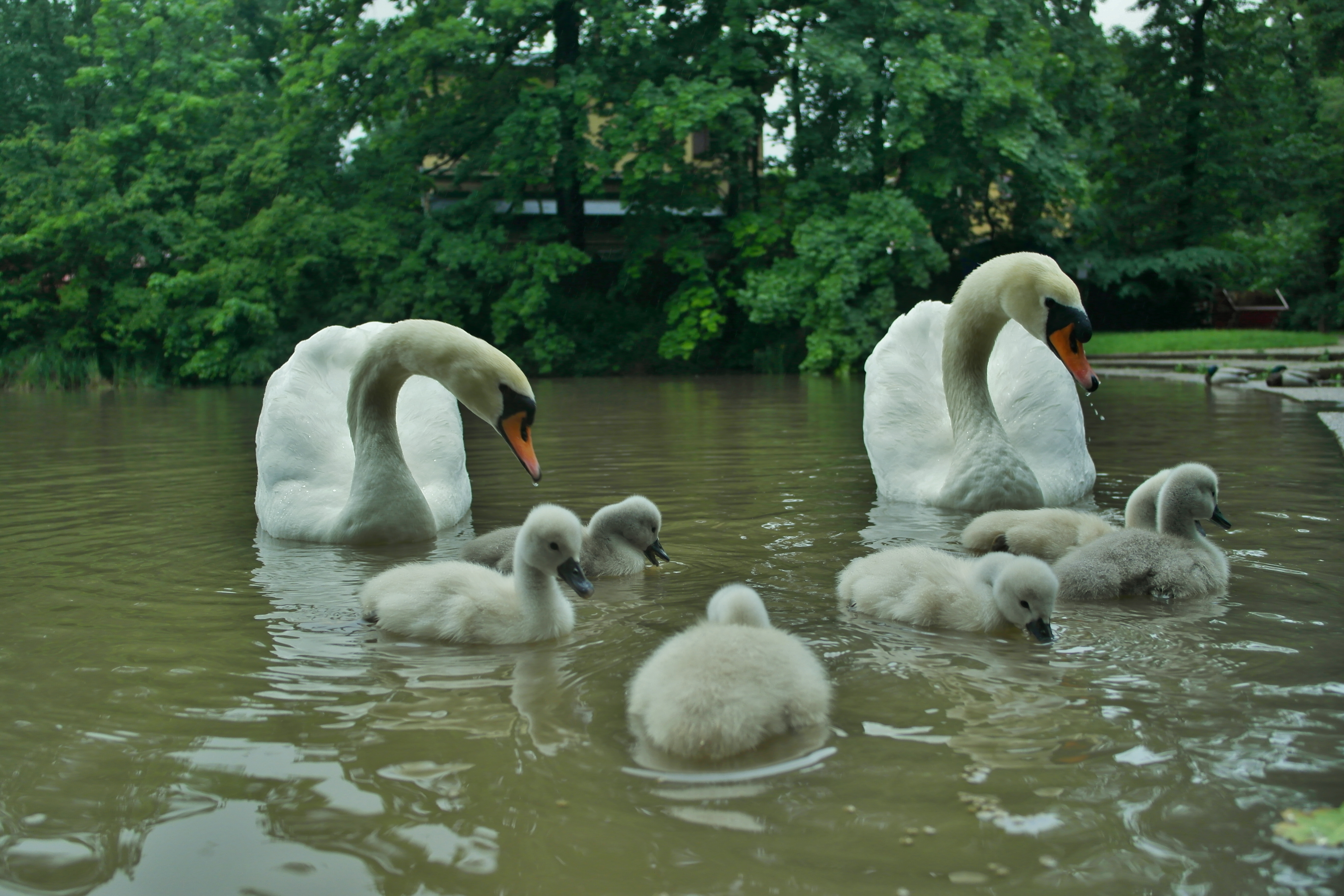

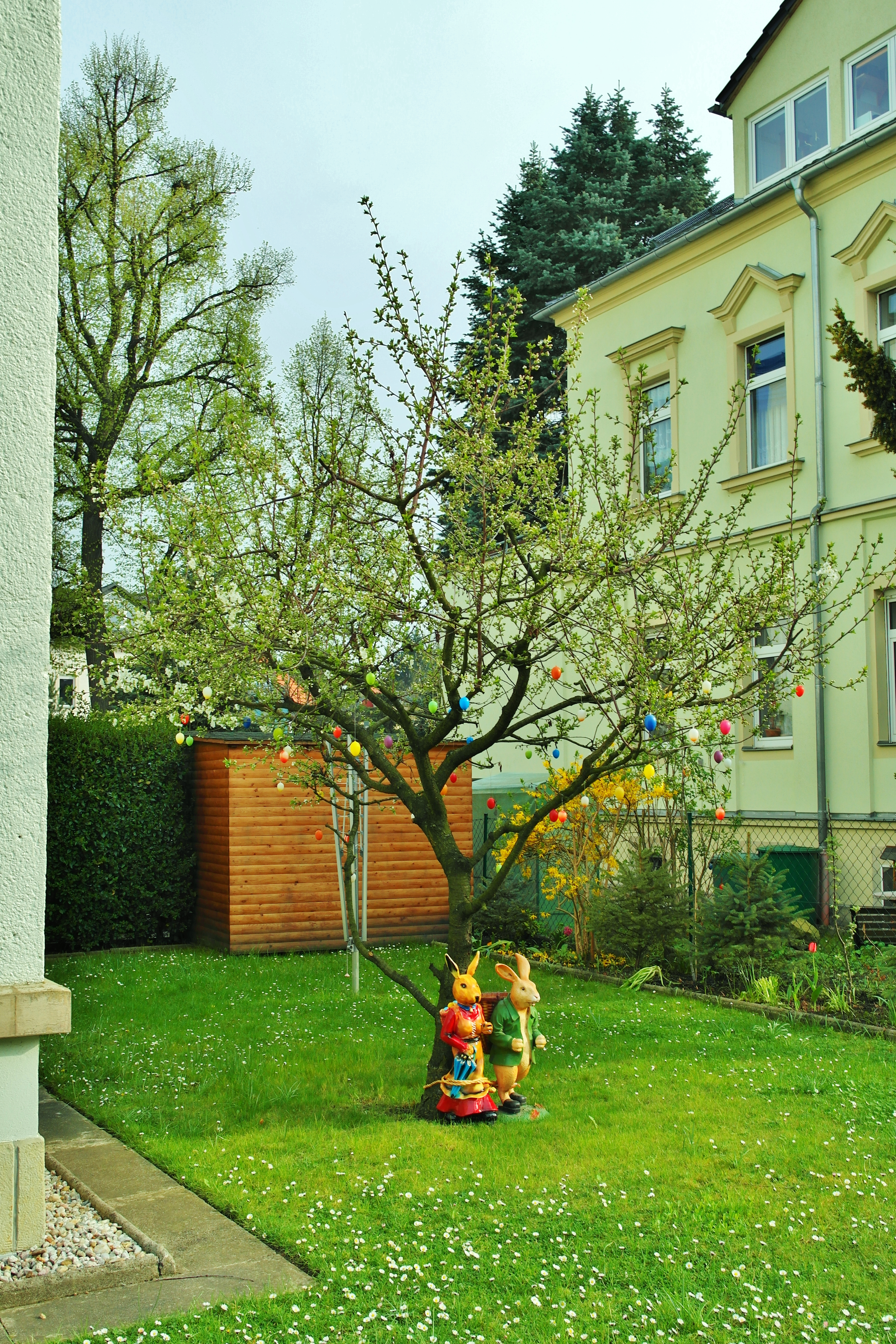

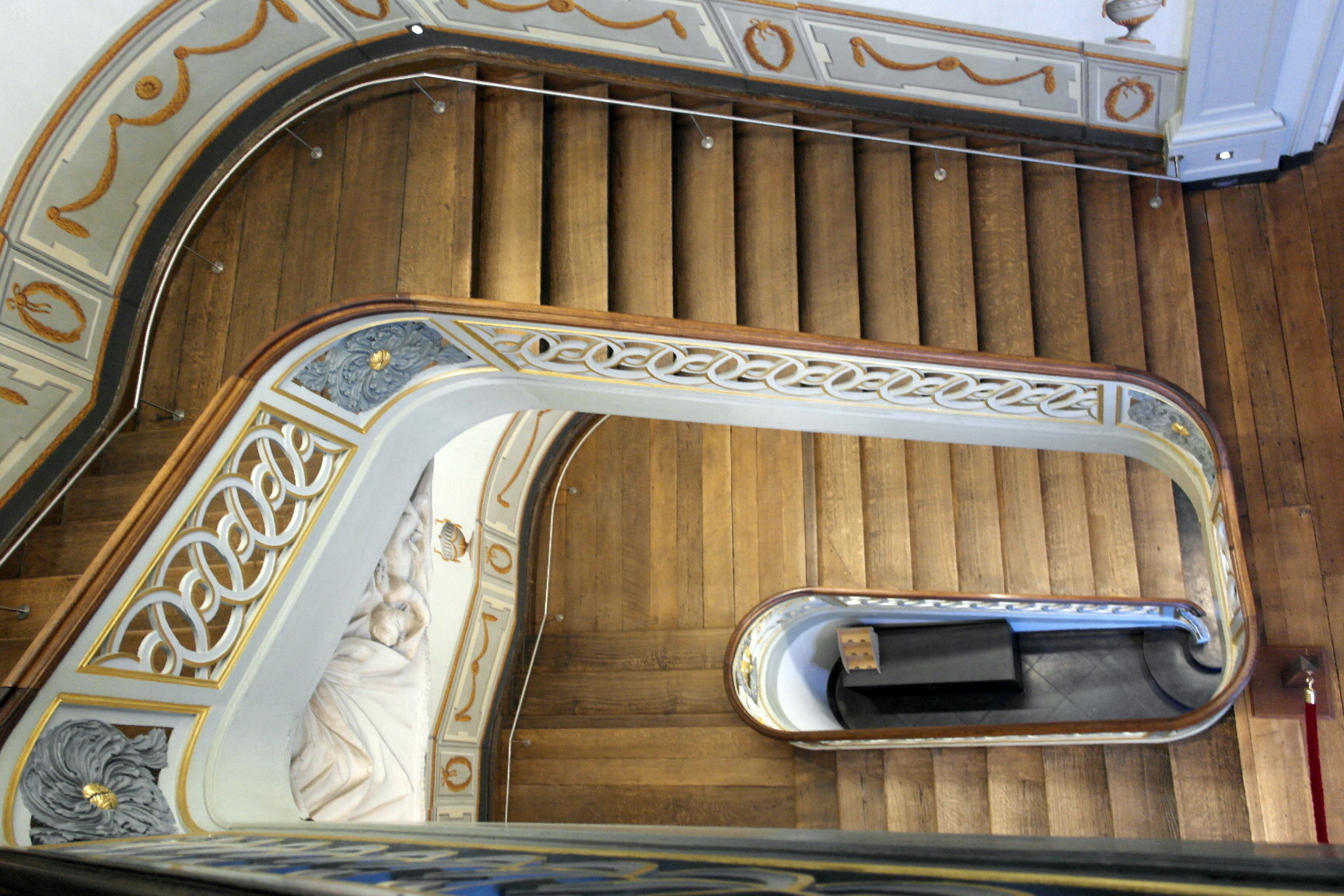

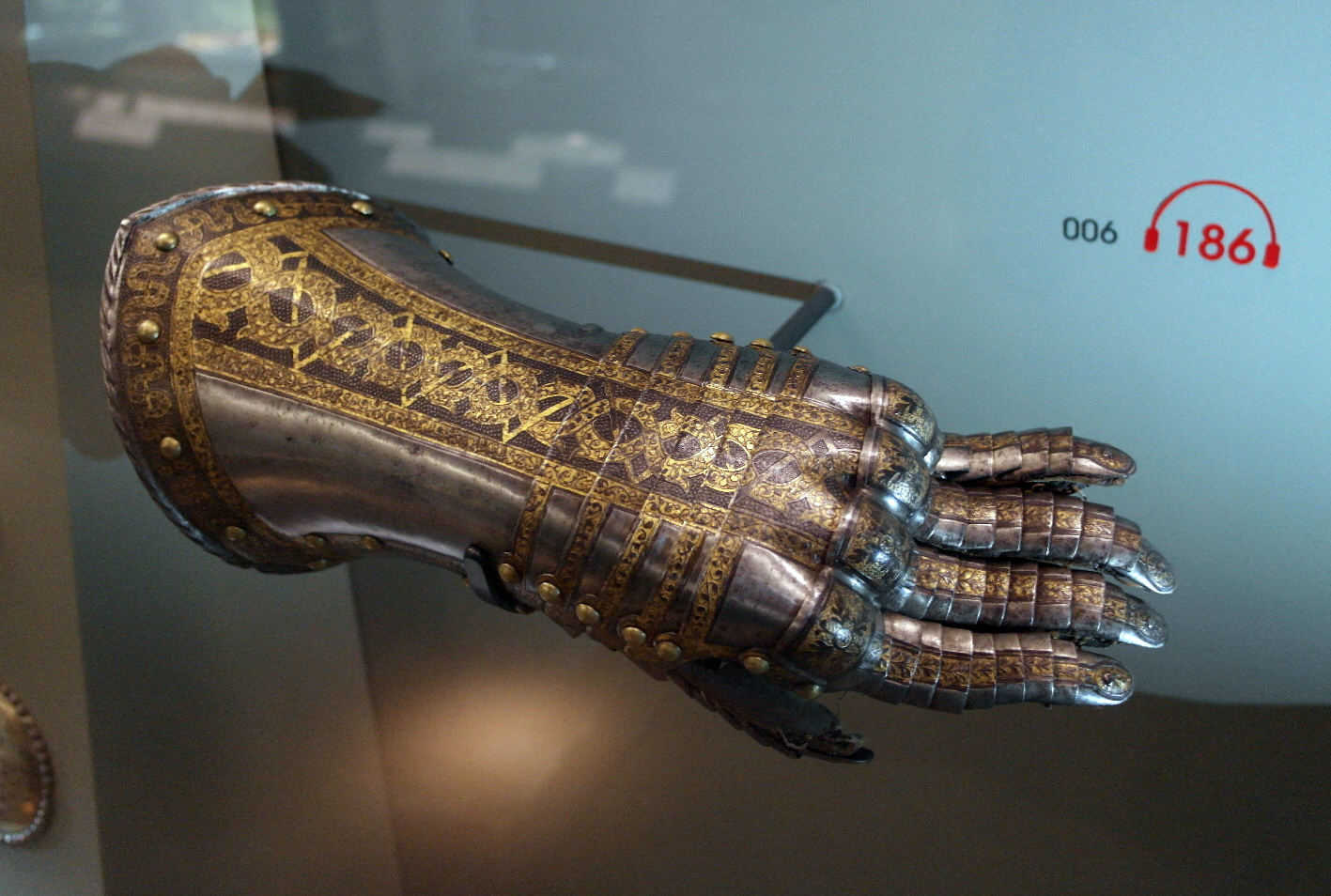

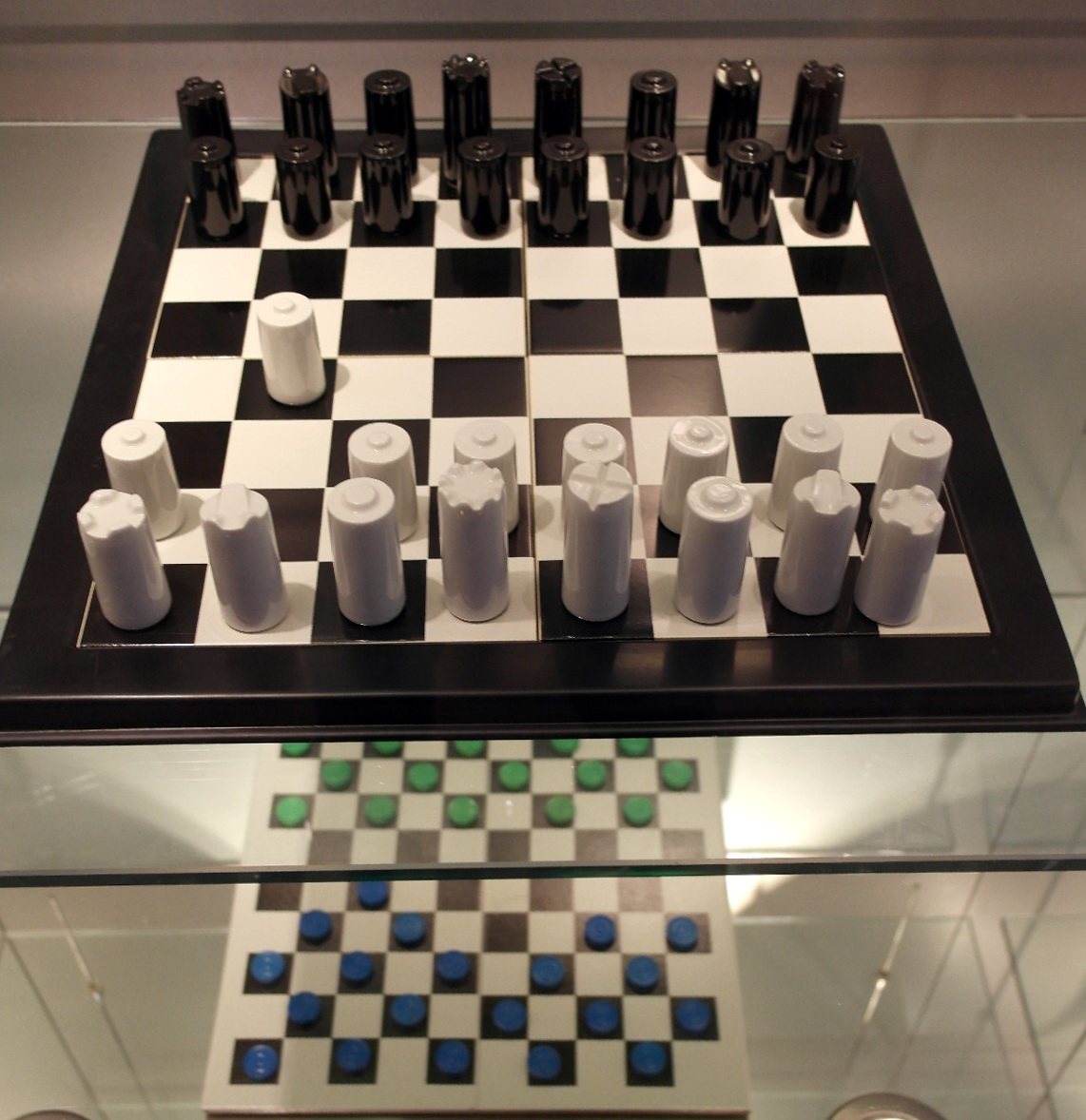

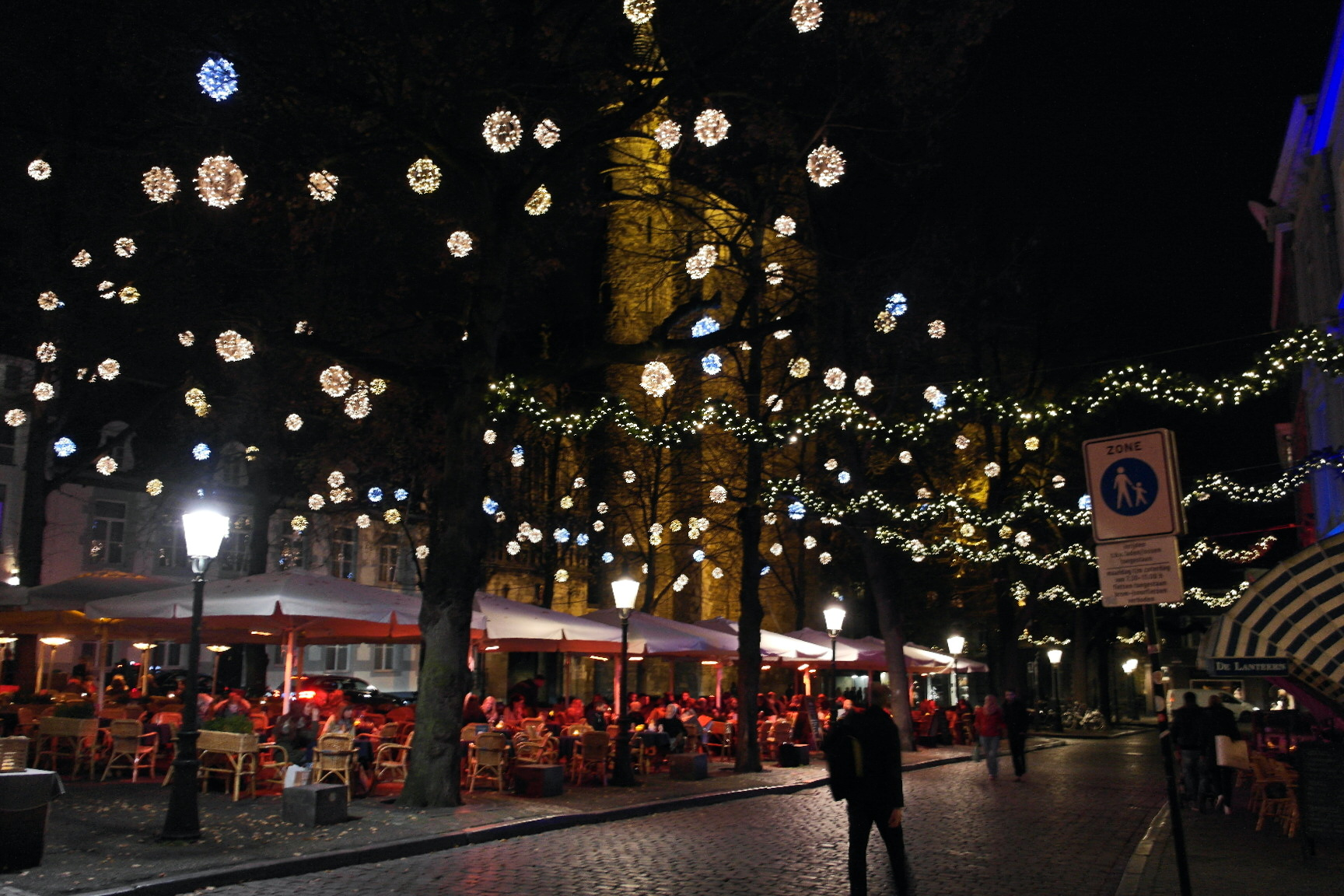

== See also ==
- Samsung NX series

Level	2010		2011	2012	2013		2014	2015
High-End								NX1
Advanced	NX10		NX11	NX20			NX30	
Mid-range		NX100	NX200	NX210	NX300		NX300M	NX500
Mid-range							Galaxy NX	
Upper-entry						NX2000	NX3000	NX3300
Entry-level	NX5			NX1000	NX1100			
Compact-entry							NX mini	NX mini 2
