= Samsung NX500 =

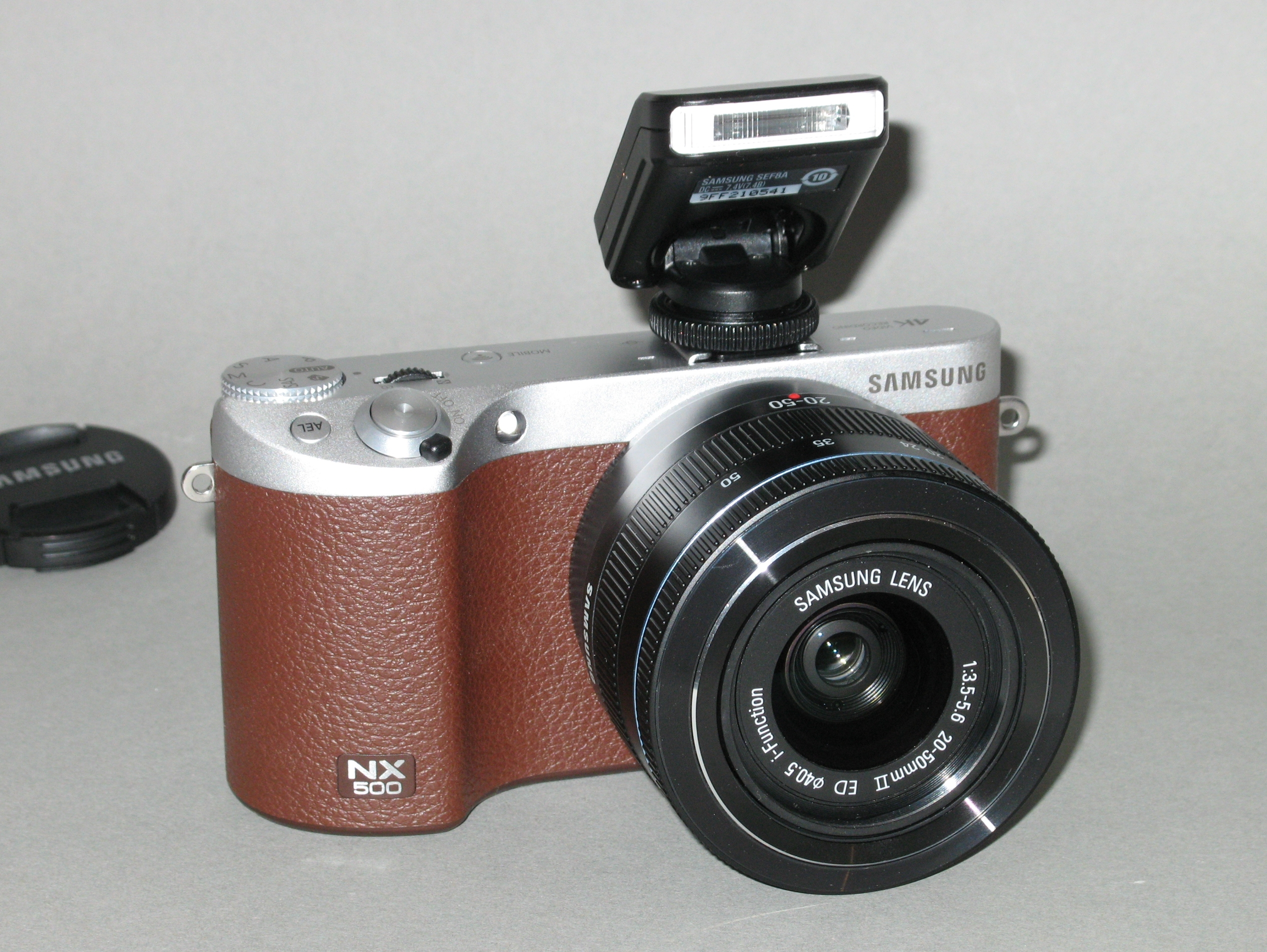
- Samsung NX500 brown version

Overview
- Maker: Samsung
- Type: Mirrorless interchangeable-lens camera
- Released: Feb 5, 2015
- Intro price: Retail: $799.99 Street: $568.88

Lens
- Lens mount: Samsung NX
- Lens: Samsung NX 16-50mm F3.5-5.6 Power Zoom ED OIS (kit lens)

Sensor/medium
- Sensor type: BSI-CMOS
- Sensor size: 23.5 x 15.7mm (APS-C type)
- Sensor maker: Samsung
- Maximum resolution: 6480 x 4320 (28 megapixels)
- Recording medium: SD, SDHC or SDXC card

Focusing
- Focus: Hybrid: by contrast (209 zones) and phase (105 points); Central, multipoint or manual
- Focus modes: Contrast Detect (sensor), Phase Detect, Multi-area, Center, Selective single-point, Tracking, Single, Continuous, Touch
- Focus areas: 209 focus points

Exposure/metering
- Exposure metering: TTL 247 zones, evaluative matrix, weighted central, punctual

Flash
- Flash: GN8 external flash included
- Flash synchronization: speed: 1/200 sec

Shutter
- Frame rate: 60 fps, 30 fps, 24 fps NTSC (50 fps, 25 fps, 24 fps PAL)
- Shutter speeds: Auto: 1/6000 - 1/4s, Manual: 1/6000 - 30s, Bulb
- Continuous shooting: 9 fps

Viewfinder
- Viewfinder magnification: 1.5x

Image processing
- Image processor: DRIMe Vs
- White balance: Yes
- Dynamic range bracketing: ±3 (at 1 EV steps)

General
- Video recording: 3840 x 2160 (30p), 4096 x 2160 (24p), 1920 x 1080 (60p, 50p, 30p, 25p, 24p), 1280 x 720, 640 x 480; format: H.265; stereo microphone
- LCD screen: 3 inches with 1,036,000 dots, SuperAMOLED
- Battery: BP1130 (Li-ion, 1130mAh, approx. 370 shots)
- AV port(s): USB, HDMI
- Data port(s): USB, HDMI, Wi-Fi IEEE 802.11b/g/n, Bluetooth
- Body features: Metallic and plastic body, WiFi and NFC, tilting touch LCD
- Dimensions: 120 x 64 x 43 mm (4.72 x 2.52 x 1.69 inches)
- Weight: 334 g (12 oz) including battery

The Samsung NX500 is a mirrorless interchangeable lens camera announced by Samsung in February 2015. Like the flagship Samsung NX1, it has a 28-megapixel back-illuminated sensor, but lacks the electronic viewfinder of the top model. It succeeds the Samsung NX300.

Level	2010		2011	2012	2013		2014	2015
High-End								NX1
Advanced	NX10		NX11	NX20			NX30	
Mid-range		NX100	NX200	NX210	NX300		NX300M	NX500
Mid-range							Galaxy NX	
Upper-entry						NX2000	NX3000	NX3300
Entry-level	NX5			NX1000	NX1100			
Compact-entry							NX mini	NX mini 2
