= Samsung NX20 =

NX20 (EV-NX20ZZBSBDK)
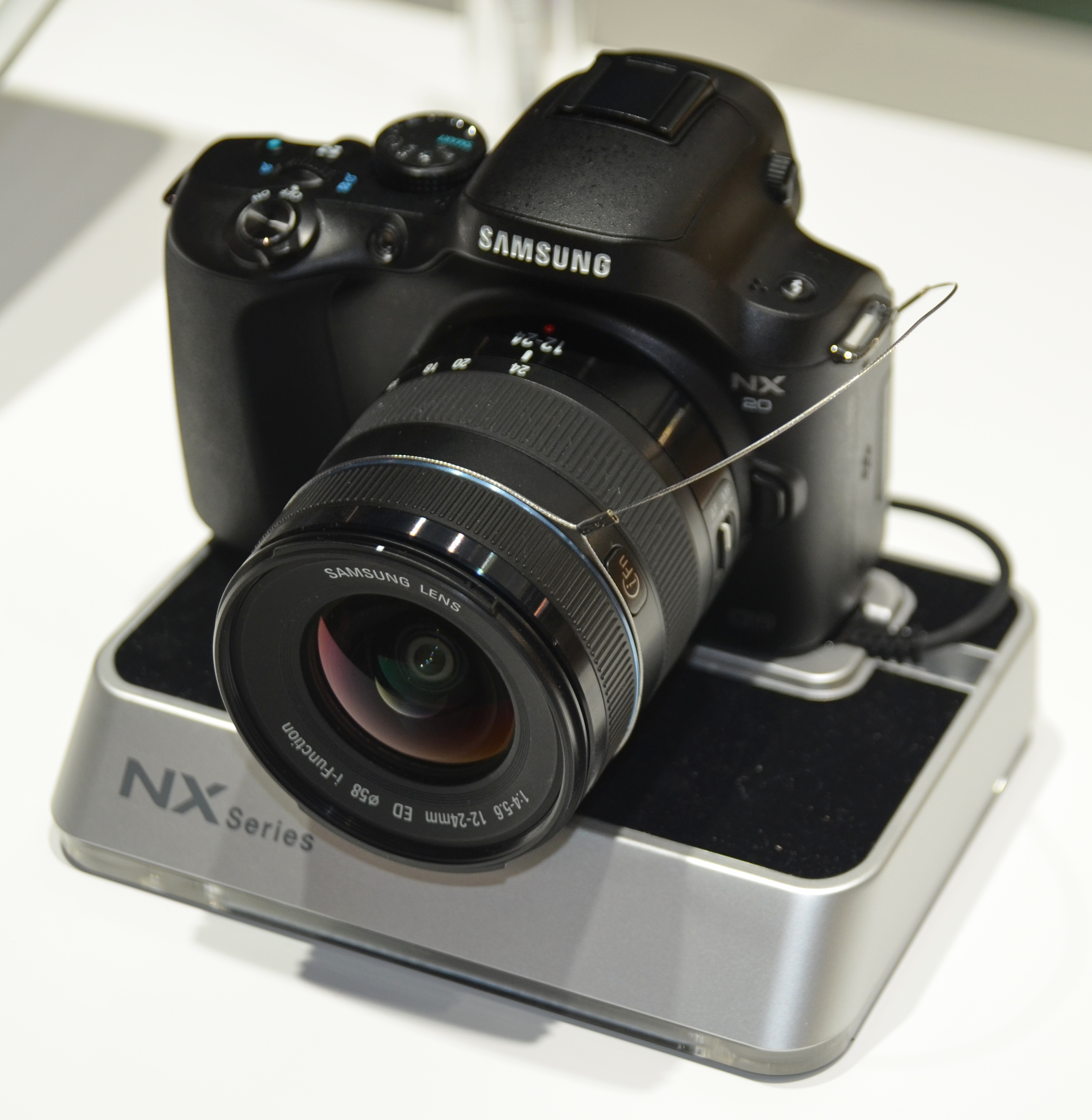

Overview
- Maker: Samsung
- Type: Mirrorless interchangeable lens camera

Lens
- Lens: Interchangeable (Samsung NX-mount)

Sensor/medium
- Sensor: 23.4 mm × 15.6 mm; CMOS, APS-C Format (20.3 effective megapixels) $C_f$=1,54
- Maximum resolution: 5472 × 3648 (20 recorded megapixels)
- Storage media: Secure Digital, SD, SDHC, SDXC

Focusing
- Focus modes: Autofocus (Single, Continuous), Manual Focus
- Focus areas: Contrast-detect 1 Point AF (free selection), 15-Area-Focusing (normal) / 35-area-focusing (close up), Face Detection (max 10 faces)

Exposure/metering
- Exposure metering: 221-segment TTL

Flash
- Flash: Built-in pop-up flash, 11 Guide Number at ISO 100

Shutter
- Shutter: Electronically controlled vertical-run focal plane shutter
- Shutter speed range: 1/8000 to 30 sec. and bulb (up to 4 minutes)
- Continuous shooting: 8 fps up to 11 JPEG or 8 RAW frames, 3 fps up to 15 frames (JPEG)

Viewfinder
- Viewfinder: EVF color display, 100% field of view, 0.68x (35mm equiv), 1.04x magnification, with 1.44M dots equivalent; and 640k dots Pentile AMOLED OCR articulated multi-angle 3-inch (76 mm) color display

Image processing
- WB bracketing: Yes

General
- LCD screen: 4:3 aspect, 3.0 inch, 614,000 dots Active-Matrix OLED (PenTile) OCR
- Battery: BP13100 1300 mAh
- AV port(s): NTSC, PAL, HDMI 1.4a (1080i, 720p, 576p / 480p)
- Data port(s): USB 2.0 (micro USB)
- Dimensions: 122.0 x 89.6 x 39.5mm (excluding the projecting parts)
- Weight: 341 g (12.0 oz) (body only, no battery or card)

The Samsung NX20 is a digital compact camera produced and marketed by Samsung since April 2012 as a successor to the Samsung NX11. It is a 20.3 Megapixel mirrorless interchangeable lens camera using the Samsung NX-mount.

The NX20 is comparable in weight and size with cameras such as the Sony NEX, Nikon 1 and the Micro Four Thirds series of cameras.

The NX20 includes the i-Function lens control system and a built-in WiFi for connection to online services such as email and social networking.

== Samsung NX30 ==
The NX30 is similar to its predecessor, the Samsung NX20, but has fast hybrid autofocus which Samsung claims can detect an object in only 80ms.

In addition to this advanced phase-detect/contrast-detect hybrid autofocus system, but it has improved ISO range, better continuous shooting speed (8 vs 9 fps), Full HD videos @ 60fps (NX20 being limited to 30fps only), a higher resolution display and tiltable viewfinder.

== See also ==
- Samsung NX series

Level	2010		2011	2012	2013		2014	2015
High-End								NX1
Advanced	NX10		NX11	NX20			NX30	
Mid-range		NX100	NX200	NX210	NX300		NX300M	NX500
Mid-range							Galaxy NX	
Upper-entry						NX2000	NX3000	NX3300
Entry-level	NX5			NX1000	NX1100			
Compact-entry							NX mini	NX mini 2
