= Samsung NX200 =

NX200 (EV-NX200ZBAB)
Overview
- Maker: Samsung
- Type: Mirrorless interchangeable lens camera

Lens
- Lens: Interchangeable (Samsung NX-mount)

Sensor/medium
- Sensor: 23.4 mm × 15.6 mm; CMOS, APS-C Format (20.3 effective megapixels) $C_f$=1,54
- Maximum resolution: 5472 × 3648 (20 recorded megapixels)
- Storage media: Secure Digital, SDHC

Focusing
- Focus modes: Autofocus (Single, Continuous), Manual Focus
- Focus areas: Contrast-detect 1 Point AF (free selection), 15-Area-Focusing (normal) / 35-area-focusing (close up), Face Detection (max 10 faces)

Exposure/metering
- Exposure metering: 221-segment TTL
- Metering modes: Multiple-weighted metering, Center-weighted metering, Spot metering

Flash
- Flash: Hot shoe and included external flash (SEF8A)

Shutter
- Shutter: Electronically controlled vertical-run focal plane shutter
- Shutter speed range: 1/4000 to 30 sec. and bulb (up to 4 minutes)
- Continuous shooting: 7fps up to 11 JPEG or 8 RAW frames, 3 fps up to 15 frames (JPEG)

Viewfinder
- Viewfinder: live preview

Image processing
- WB bracketing: Yes

General
- LCD screen: 3.0 in, 614,000 dots Active-Matrix OLED (PenTile)
- Battery: BP1030 1030 mAh
- AV port(s): NTSC, PAL, HDMI 1.3
- Data port(s): USB 2.0 (micro USB)
- Dimensions: 116.5 x 62.5 x 36.2mm (excluding the projecting parts)
- Weight: 220.4 g (body only, no battery or card)

The Samsung NX200 is a 20.3 effective megapixel APS-C crop CMOS mirrorless interchangeable lens digital camera made by Samsung. It was announced on September 1, 2011.

== Changes from NX100 ==
- Higher resolution movies. 1080p @ 30fps vs 720p @ 30fps
- Shoots faster. 7 fps vs 3 fps
- Higher maximum light sensitivity. 12,800 ISO vs 3,200 ISO
- Higher sensor resolution. 20 MP vs 14 MP
- Lighter. 220g vs 282g
- Smaller. 117x63x36 mm vs 120x71x35 mm
- Smart Shoe (for add-on EVF compatibility) has been removed.
- Battery life (CIPA standard) shorter. NX200 (320 shots) | NX100 (420 shots)

== See also ==
- Samsung NX series
- Samsung NX-mount

== External links and reviews ==
- Review at samsungnx200.org
- Review at dpreview.com
- Review at Imaging Resource
- Samsung NX200 vs Samsung NX100 comparison at snapsort.com

Level	2010		2011	2012	2013		2014	2015
High-End								NX1
Advanced	NX10		NX11	NX20			NX30	
Mid-range		NX100	NX200	NX210	NX300		NX300M	NX500
Mid-range							Galaxy NX	
Upper-entry						NX2000	NX3000	NX3300
Entry-level	NX5			NX1000	NX1100			
Compact-entry							NX mini	NX mini 2
