= NX300 =

NX300 may refer to:

- Lexus NX300, a motor vehicle
- Samsung NX300, a camera model
