= Samsung NX30 =

Overview
- Maker: Samsung

Sensor/medium
- Sensor type: CMOS
- Sensor size: 23.5 x 15.7mm (APS-C type)
- Maximum resolution: 5472 x 3648 (20 megapixels)
- Film speed: 100-25600
- Recording medium: SD, SDHC, SDXC

Focusing
- Focus areas: 247 focus points

Shutter
- Shutter speeds: 1/8000s to 30s
- Continuous shooting: 9 frames per second

Viewfinder
- Viewfinder magnification: 1
- Frame coverage: 100%

Image processing
- Image processor: DRIMe IV
- White balance: Yes

General
- LCD screen: 3 inches with 1,036,000 dots
- Dimensions: 127 x 96 x 58mm (5 x 3.78 x 2.28 inches)
- Weight: 375 g (13 oz) including battery

The Samsung NX30 is a DSLR-style mirrorless camera, part of Samsung's NX series announced by Samsung on January 2, 2014. It is the successor of the Samsung NX20.

The NX30 is visually similar to its predecessor, the Samsung NX20, but is more advanced and has a fast hybrid autofocus which Samsung claims can detect an object in only 80ms. Other significant changes include a much more powerful processor which makes the camera far more responsible and faster, a much larger body with very good ergonomics, better video quality and capability (Full HD 60 fps, and a better codec), enhanced Wi-Fi connectivity, touch sensitive flexible display, and a large fast viewfinder with unique tilt construction.

Although nearly the same sensor was used, the NX30 had improved ISO range. The sensor lacks somewhat against modern competitors on high sensitivity, but is capable of delivering very detailed images with Samsung lenses.

Level	2010		2011	2012	2013		2014	2015
High-End								NX1
Advanced	NX10		NX11	NX20			NX30	
Mid-range		NX100	NX200	NX210	NX300		NX300M	NX500
Mid-range							Galaxy NX	
Upper-entry						NX2000	NX3000	NX3300
Entry-level	NX5			NX1000	NX1100			
Compact-entry							NX mini	NX mini 2
