= NX1 =

NX1 may refer to:

- Samsung NX1, camera
- Neverwinter Nights 2: Mask of the Betrayer, game
- AT Metro bus route NX1, express bus route in Auckland, New Zealand
