= Samsung NX100 =

Samsung NX100 (EV-NX10ZZBAB)
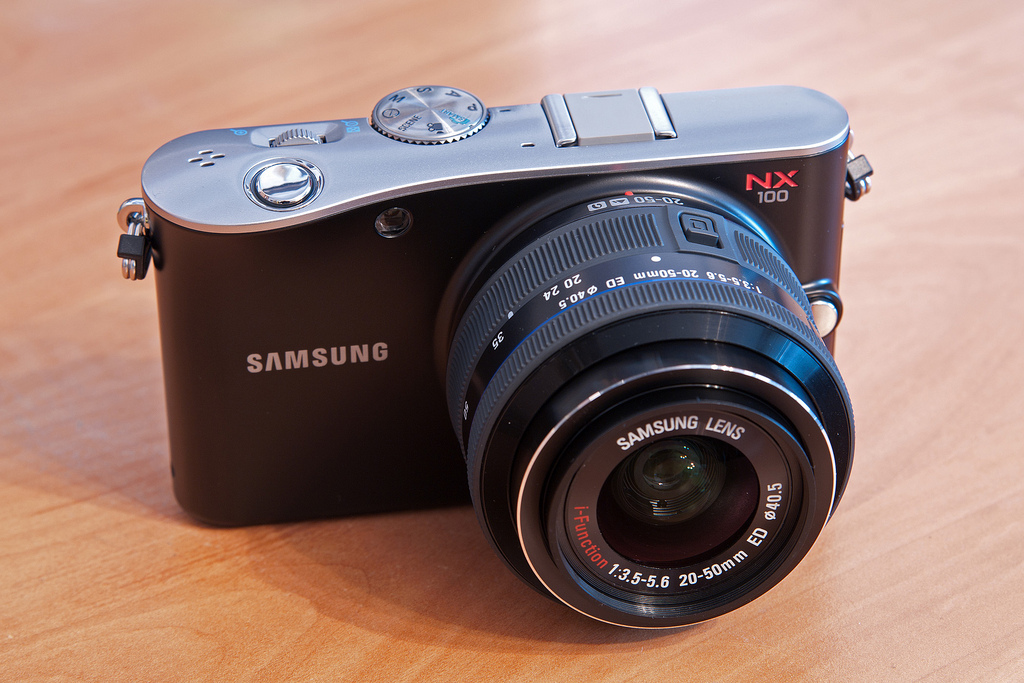

Overview
- Maker: Samsung Electronics
- Type: Mirrorless interchangeable lens camera
- Released: September 14, 2010
- Intro price: $599.99 USD

Lens
- Lens: Interchangeable (Samsung NX-mount)

Sensor/medium
- Sensor: 23.4 mm × 15.6 mm; CMOS, APS-C Format (14.6 effective megapixels) $C_f$=1,54
- Maximum resolution: 4592 × 3056 (14.0 recorded megapixels)
- Storage media: Secure Digital, SDHC

Focusing
- Focus modes: Autofocus (Single, Continuous), Manual Focus
- Focus areas: Contrast-detect 1 Point AF (free selection), 15-Area-Focusing (normal) / 35-area-focusing (close up), Face Detection (max 10 faces)

Exposure/metering
- Exposure modes: Program, Aperture priority, Shutter priority, Manual, Smart Auto, Lens Priority, Movie, Scene (Beauty Shot, Children, Sports, Close Up, Text, Sunset, Dawn, Backlight, Fireworks, Beach & Snow, Night, Portrait, Landscape, Sound picture)
- Exposure metering: 247-zone multi-pattern sensing system
- Metering modes: Multiple-weighted metering, Center-weighted metering, Spot metering

Shutter
- Shutter: Electronically controlled vertical-run focal plane shutter
- Shutter speed range: 1/4000 to 30 sec. and bulb (up to 8 minutes)
- Continuous shooting: 3fps up to 3/10 frames (raw/JPEG)

Viewfinder
- Viewfinder: live preview, optional electronic viewfinder (EVF10)

General
- Video recording: From 320p/640p 4:3 to 720p/30 fps 16:9
- LCD screen: 3.0 in, 614,000 dots Active Matrix OLED
- Battery: BP1310 1300 mAh Lithium-ion battery
- AV port(s): Micro HDMI and AV
- Weight: 282 g (body only, no battery or card)

The Samsung NX100 is a 14.0 effective megapixel APS-C crop CMOS mirrorless interchangeable lens digital camera made by Samsung. It was announced on September 14, 2010.

== Changes from NX10 ==
- No built-in EVF or built-in flash. Instead, the hot-shoe supports:
  - Optional external flashes
  - Optional GPS adapter
  - Optional EVF (23g, 320x240 (QVGA), 0.83x magnification, 98% coverage)
- Samsung i-Function compatibility at launch (was added to NX10 in a firmware upgrade)
- The kit lens is a smaller, non-OIS, collapsing 20-50mm iFn lens
- Lens Priority mode, which adjusts settings and menus depending on which lens is attached

== See also ==
- Samsung NX series
- Samsung NX-mount

Level	2010		2011	2012	2013		2014	2015
High-End								NX1
Advanced	NX10		NX11	NX20			NX30	
Mid-range		NX100	NX200	NX210	NX300		NX300M	NX500
Mid-range							Galaxy NX	
Upper-entry						NX2000	NX3000	NX3300
Entry-level	NX5			NX1000	NX1100			
Compact-entry							NX mini	NX mini 2
