= Samsung NX1000 =

NX1000 (EV-NX1000BABGB)
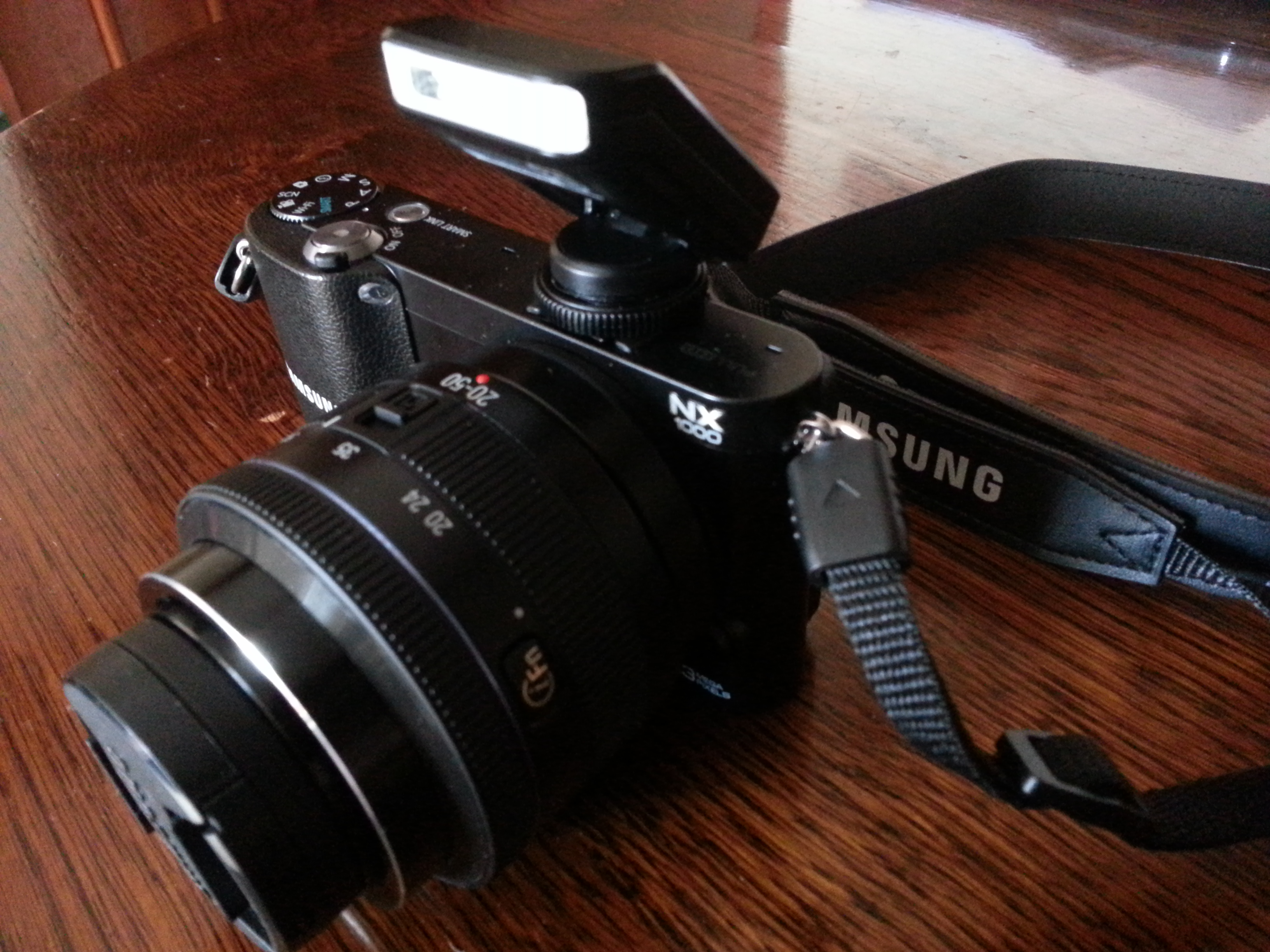

Overview
- Maker: Samsung
- Type: Mirrorless interchangeable lens camera

Lens
- Lens: Interchangeable (Samsung NX-mount)

Sensor/medium
- Sensor: 23.5 mm × 15.7 mm; CMOS, APS-C Format (20.3 effective megapixels) $C_f$=1,54
- Maximum resolution: 5472 × 3648 (20 recorded megapixels)
- Storage media: Secure Digital, SD, SDHC, SDXC

Focusing
- Focus modes: Autofocus (Single, Continuous), Manual Focus
- Focus areas: Contrast-detect 1 Point AF (free selection), 15-Area-Focusing (normal) / 35-area-focusing (close up), Face Detection (max 10 faces)

Exposure/metering
- Exposure metering: 221-segment TTL

Flash
- Flash: External (hotshoe only)

Shutter
- Shutter: Electronically controlled vertical-run focal plane shutter
- Shutter speed range: 1/4000 to 30 sec. and bulb (up to 4 minutes)
- Continuous shooting: 8 fps up to 11 JPEG or 8 RAW frames, 3 fps up to 15 frames (JPEG)

Viewfinder
- Viewfinder: LCD only

Image processing
- WB bracketing: Yes

General
- LCD screen: 4:3 aspect, 3.0 inch, 921k dots TFT LCD
- Battery: BP1030 1030 mAh
- AV port(s): NTSC, PAL, HDMI 1.4a (1080i, 720p, 576p / 480p)
- Data port: USB 2.0 (micro USB)
- Dimensions: 114 x 62.5 x 37.5mm (excluding the projecting parts)
- Weight: 222 g (7.8 oz) (body only, no battery or card)

The Samsung NX1000 is a digital compact camera produced and marketed by Samsung since April 2012 as an entry-level camera with interchangeable lenses. It is a 20.3-megapixel mirrorless interchangeable-lens camera using the Samsung NX-mount.

The NX1000 is comparable in weight and size with cameras such as the Sony NEX, Nikon 1 and the Micro Four Thirds series of cameras.

The NX1000 includes the i-Function lens control system and built-in WiFi for connection to online services such as email and social networking.

== See also ==
- Samsung NX series

Level	2010		2011	2012	2013		2014	2015
High-End								NX1
Advanced	NX10		NX11	NX20			NX30	
Mid-range		NX100	NX200	NX210	NX300		NX300M	NX500
Mid-range							Galaxy NX	
Upper-entry						NX2000	NX3000	NX3300
Entry-level	NX5			NX1000	NX1100			
Compact-entry							NX mini	NX mini 2
