= Samsung NX300M =

Overview
- Maker: Samsung

Lens
- Lens mount: Samsung NX

Sensor/medium
- Sensor type: CMOS
- Sensor size: 23.5 x 15.7mm (APS-C type)
- Maximum resolution: 5472 x 3648 (20 megapixels)
- Recording medium: SD, SDHC or SDXC memory card

Focusing
- Focus areas: 247 focus points

Shutter
- Shutter speeds: 1/6000s to 30s
- Continuous shooting: 8.6 frames per second

Image processing
- Image processor: DRIMe IV
- White balance: Yes

General
- LCD screen: 3.3 inches with 768,000 dots
- Dimensions: 122 x 64 x 41mm (4.8 x 2.52 x 1.61 inches)
- Weight: 331 g (12 oz) including battery

The Samsung NX300M is a rangefinder-styled digital mirrorless camera announced by Samsung on January 3, 2013. It was the first consumer product based on the Tizen operating system. Its other upgrades over the NX300 model include increased rotation range for the tiltable display, allowing it to be put into a 180 degree "selfie" position. It was initially on sale in South Korea only, and its containing the Tizen operating system was not revealed until almost a month later.

Level	2010		2011	2012	2013		2014	2015
High-End								NX1
Advanced	NX10		NX11	NX20			NX30	
Mid-range		NX100	NX200	NX210	NX300		NX300M	NX500
Mid-range							Galaxy NX	
Upper-entry						NX2000	NX3000	NX3300
Entry-level	NX5			NX1000	NX1100			
Compact-entry							NX mini	NX mini 2
