= Samsung NX10 =

Digital camera made by Samsung

Samsung NX10 (EV-NX10ZZBAB)
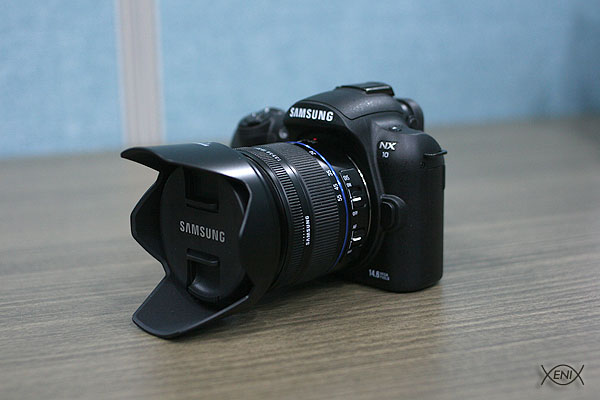

Overview
- Maker: Samsung Group
- Type: Mirrorless interchangeable lens camera

Lens
- Lens: Interchangeable (Samsung NX-mount)

Sensor/medium
- Sensor: 23.4 mm × 15.6 mm; CMOS, APS-C Format (14.6 effective megapixels) $C_f$=1,54
- Maximum resolution: 4592 × 3056 (14.0 recorded megapixels)
- Storage media: Secure Digital, SDHC

Focusing
- Focus modes: Autofocus (Single, Continuous), Manual Focus
- Focus areas: Contrast-detect 1 Point AF (free selection), 15-Area-Focusing (normal) / 35-area-focusing (close up), Face Detection (max 10 faces)

Exposure/metering
- Exposure modes: Program, Aperture priority, Shutter priority, Manual, Smart Auto, Night, Portrait, Landscape, Scene, Movie
- Exposure metering: 247-zone multi-pattern sensing system
- Metering modes: Multiple-weighted metering, Center-weighted metering, Spot metering

Shutter
- Shutter: Electronically controlled vertical-run focal plane shutter
- Shutter speed range: 1/4000 to 30 sec. and bulb (up to 8 minutes)
- Continuous shooting: 3 frame/s up to 3/10 frames (raw/JPEG)

Viewfinder
- Viewfinder: EVF VGA (640 x 480), 921k dots, 100% coverage, 0.86x magnification

General
- LCD screen: 3.0 in, 614,000 dots Active Matrix OLED
- Battery: BP1310 1300 mAh Lithium-ion battery
- Weight: 353 g (body only, no battery or card)

The Samsung NX10 is a 14.0 effective megapixel APS-C crop CMOS mirrorless interchangeable lens digital camera made by Samsung. It was announced on January 4, 2010 and is one of the first mirrorless cameras with an APS-C sized sensor. Samsung NX11 replaces NX10 in manufacturing since February 2011.

== Features ==
- 15.1 Megapixel APS-C CMOS sensor with 14.6 million effective pixels (successor of the Pentax K20D sensor)
- Proprietary Samsung NX-mount
- JPEG and raw (TIFF-based proprietary) formats are used
- Up to 720p movie capture (H.264, 30 frame/s)
- Fast contrast-detect autofocus
- 3.0" AMOLED screen (614k dots, RGB array with subpixel rendering (PenTile)
- 921k dots electronic viewfinder
- HDMI 1.3 CEC technology (Anynet+) enabled interface
- DRIMe II Pro processor
- Ultrasound sensor cleaning system
- Samsung i-Function (since firmware ver. 1.20)
- Optional GPS adapter
- Panorama photo (since firmware ver. 1.30)

== See also ==
- Samsung NX series
- Samsung NX-mount

Level	2010		2011	2012	2013		2014	2015
High-End								NX1
Advanced	NX10		NX11	NX20			NX30	
Mid-range		NX100	NX200	NX210	NX300		NX300M	NX500
Mid-range							Galaxy NX	
Upper-entry						NX2000	NX3000	NX3300
Entry-level	NX5			NX1000	NX1100			
Compact-entry							NX mini	NX mini 2
