= Samyang 14mm f/2.8 IF ED UMC Aspherical =

Photographic lens

Samyang 14mm f/2.8 ES AS IF UMC
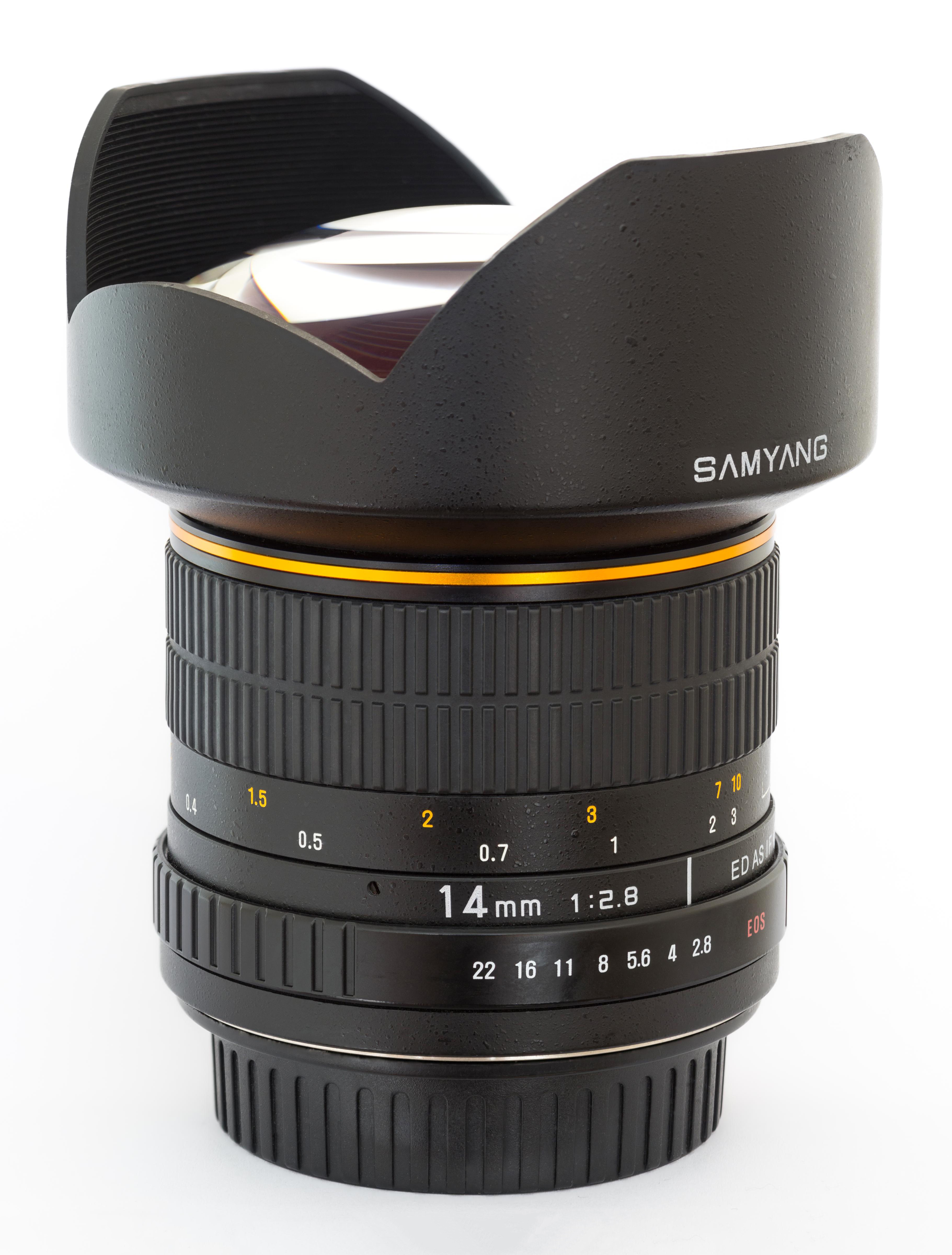
- Maker: Samyang Optics

Technical data
- Type: Prime
- Focal length: 14 mm
- Crop factor: full frame
- Aperture (max/min): f/2.8 - f/22
- Close focus distance: 0.28 m (0.92 ft)
- Diaphragm blades: 6
- Construction: 14 elements in 10 groups

Features
- Application: Ultra wide angle prime

Physical
- Max. length: 93.6 mm (3.69 in)–117.1 mm (4.61 in), depends on the mount
- Diameter: 87 mm (3.4 in)
- Weight: 530 g (19 oz)–573 g (20.2 oz), depends on the mount
- Filter diameter: none

Accessories
- Lens hood: fixed

Angle of view
- Diagonal: 115.7°

History
- Introduction: 2009

The Samyang 14mm f/2.8 ED AS IF UMC is Samyang's ultra wide angle prime lens for the 35 mm film format. It replaces the shortly sold Samyang 14mm f/2.8 IF ED MC Aspherical.

== Description ==
The Samyang 14mm is sold for many different SLR lens mounts and thus its dimensions vary accordingly. Lens mounts with shorter flange focal distances are longer and heavier. As a manual focus only lens, it does not support auto focus. It also has an aperture ring which manually adjusts the aperture with half-stop clicks. This has enabled the manufacturer to produce a lens of surprising quality while remaining several times cheaper than equivalent lenses from either Nikon or Canon. It is one of the widest non-fisheye prime lenses.

While the lens has some level of mustache distortion, it is able to offer superior levels of resolution compared to the Nikon AF-S 14-24mm f/2.8G. Also, while it has a fair level of vignetting like most other wide angle lenses, it manages to keep chromatic aberration levels to a minimum.

The hood of the lens is fixed and the front element protrudes extensively, forcing the lens cap to take an unconventional shape, covering the entire hood. This also does not allow the placing of a filter in the front.

The lens contains one glass aspherical element and one hybrid aspherical element.

It is also sold under a number of different brands such as Rokinon, Vivitar and Bower.

Samyang has announced the AE version of the lens for Nikon which includes a CPU and electronic contacts to allow for automatic exposure in all modes, including in camera models that do not normally support automatic exposure with manual focus Nikon Ai lenses. The AE version became available on 28 December 2010 with the suggested retail price of 389 EUR.
