= Samyang 85mm f/1.4 IF Aspherical =

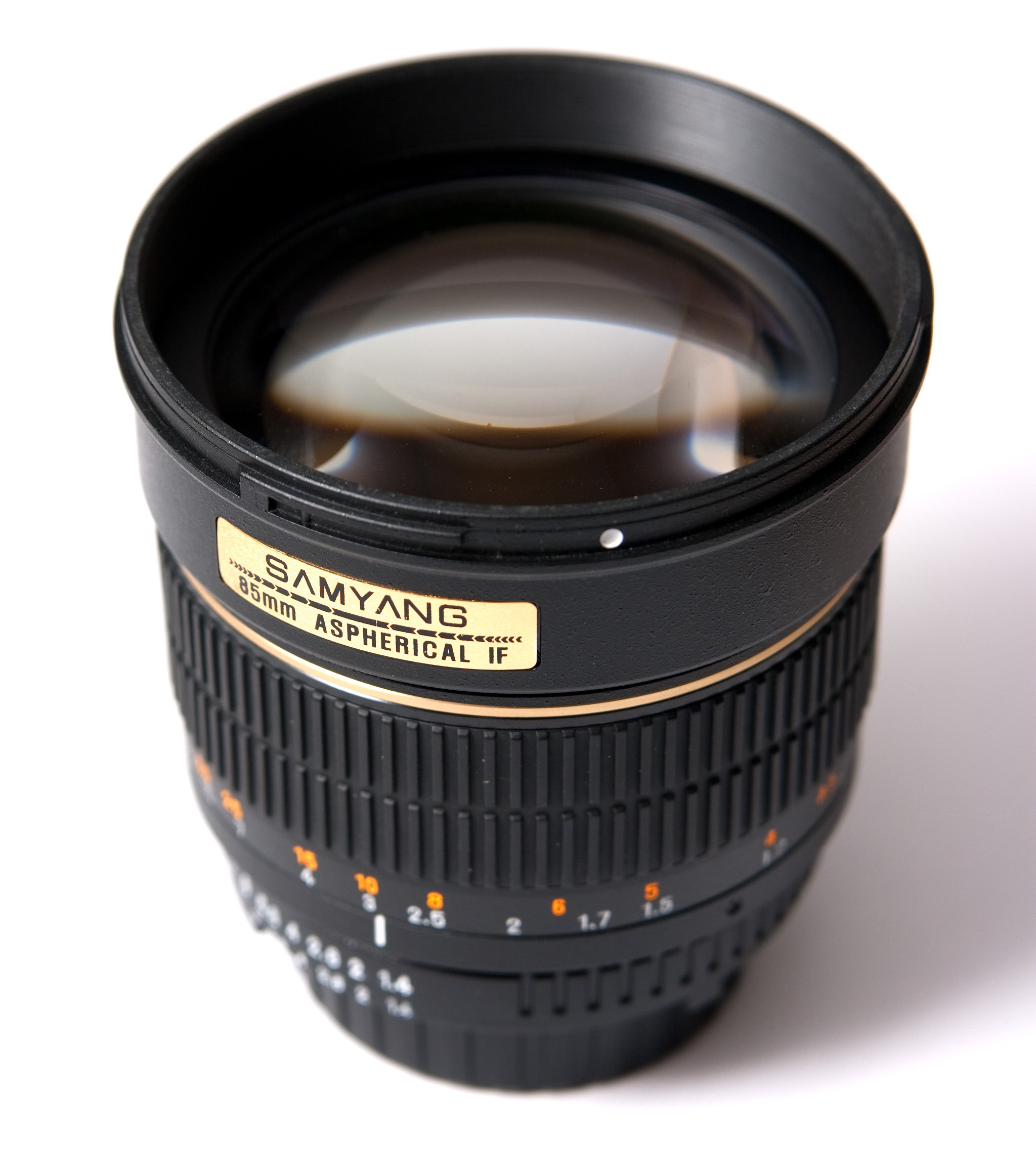
- Maker: Samyang Optics
- Lens mount(s): Canon EF, Nikon F (FX), Four Thirds, Pentax K, Sony/Minolta Alpha, Sony E, Samsung NX

Technical data
- Type: Prime
- Focus drive: manual
- Focal length: 85 mm
- Crop factor: full frame
- Aperture (max/min): f/1.4 - f/22
- Close focus distance: 1 m (3.3 ft)
- Diaphragm blades: 8
- Construction: 9 elements in 7 groups

Features
- Manual focus override: No No
- Weather-sealing: No No
- Lens-based stabilization: No No
- Macro capable: No No
- Aperture ring: Yes Yes
- Application: Portrait telephoto prime

Physical
- Max. length: 72.2 mm (2.84 in) – 95.7 mm (3.77 in), depends on the mount
- Diameter: 78 mm (3.1 in)
- Weight: 513 g (18.1 oz) – 560 g (20 oz), depends on the mount
- Filter diameter: 72 mm

Accessories
- Lens hood: included

Angle of view
- Diagonal: 28.3°

History
- Introduction: 2009

The Samyang 85mm f/1.4 IF Aspherical is Samyang's 35mm format moderate telephoto prime lens for portraiture.

== Introduction ==
The Samyang 85mm supports most SLR mounts and thus its dimensions vary accordingly. As a manual focus only lens, it does not support auto focus. This has enabled the manufacturer to produce a lens of exceptional quality while remaining significantly cheaper than equivalent lenses from either Nikon or Canon.

The lens contains one aspherical element.

It is also sold under a number of different brands such as Walimex, Rokinon, Vivitar and Bower.

Samyang has released the AE version of the lens for Nikon which includes a CPU and electronic contacts to allow for automatic exposure in all modes, including in camera models that do not normally support automatic exposure with manual focus Nikon Ai lenses.

The first version of the lens (in all mounts) had a golden ring. A second version with a red ring has been released, and benefits from the new UMC coating. A third version was later released, which changed the shape of the lens hood mount.

== Reception ==
Photozone noted low distortion and vignetting, high longitudinal chromatic aberration and competitive sharpness at f/4. At other apertures, it "may not be the sharpest lens around but it offers a good and very affordable introduction into shallow depth-of-field photography".

Camera Labs evaluated the lens as delivering "very good results" when "viewed in isolation", and giving a sharper image in the corners than a Nikkor 85mm f1.4G, but losing to it in the centre.
