= Samsung NX11 =

Overview
- Maker: Samsung

Lens
- Lens mount: Samsung NX

Sensor/medium
- Sensor type: CMOS
- Sensor size: 23.4 x 15.6mm (APS-C type)
- Maximum resolution: 4592 x 3056 (15 megapixels)
- Recording medium: SD or SDHC card

Focusing
- Focus areas: 15 focus points

Shutter
- Shutter speeds: 1/4000s to 30s
- Continuous shooting: 3.0 frames per second

Viewfinder
- Viewfinder magnification: 0.86
- Frame coverage: 100%

Image processing
- Image processor: DRIM Engine
- White balance: Yes

General
- LCD screen: 3 inches with 614,000 dots
- Dimensions: 123 x 87 x 40mm (4.84 x 3.43 x 1.57 inches)
- Weight: 499 g (18 oz) including battery

The Samsung NX11 is a DSLR-styled mirrorless camera announced by Samsung on December 28, 2010. It introduces the i-Function feature to the NX10 lineage, and has a redesigned grip.

Level	2010		2011	2012	2013		2014	2015
High-End								NX1
Advanced	NX10		NX11	NX20			NX30	
Mid-range		NX100	NX200	NX210	NX300		NX300M	NX500
Mid-range							Galaxy NX	
Upper-entry						NX2000	NX3000	NX3300
Entry-level	NX5			NX1000	NX1100			
Compact-entry							NX mini	NX mini 2
