= Samsung NX1 =

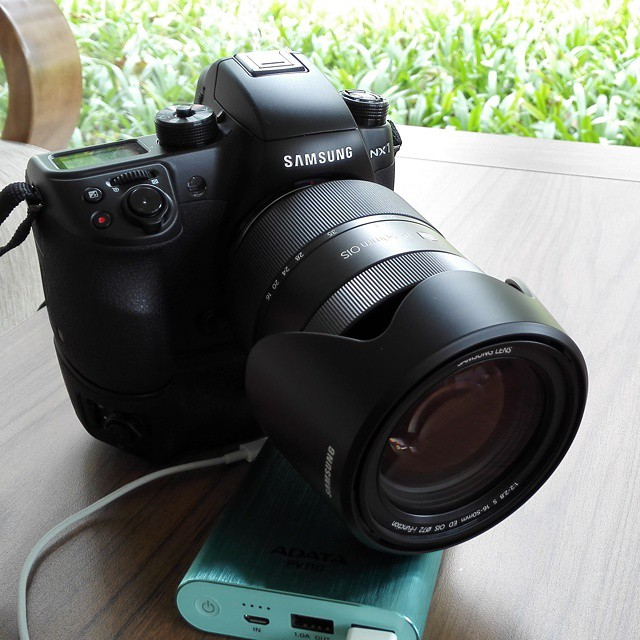
- Samsung NX1 with battery grip and 16-50mm f/2-2.8 lens

Overview
- Maker: Samsung

Lens
- Lens mount: Samsung NX

Sensor/medium
- Sensor type: BSI-CMOS
- Sensor size: 23.5 x 15.7 mm (APS-C type)
- Sensor maker: Samsung
- Maximum resolution: 6480 x 4320 (28 megapixels)
- Film speed: 100-25600, expandable to 51200
- Recording medium: SD, SDHC, SDXC (UHS-I/II supported)

Focusing
- Focus: Hybrid AF
- Focus areas: 209 focus points

Flash
- Flash: Built In and Hot Shoe

Shutter
- Frame rate: 15 FPS
- Shutter speeds: 1/8000s to 30s
- Continuous shooting: 15 frames per second

Viewfinder
- Viewfinder magnification: 1.04
- Frame coverage: 100%

Image processing
- Image processor: DRIMe 5
- White balance: Yes

General
- LCD screen: 3 inches with 1,036,000 dots
- Dimensions: 139 x 102 x 66mm (5.47 x 4.02 x 2.6 inches)
- Weight: 550 g (19 oz) including battery

Samsung NX1 is a 28.2 MP Mirrorless Digital Camera body, using the NX System lens mount. A variety of professional and consumer lenses were introduced along with the camera. It was announced by Samsung on September 15, 2014. While Samsung never formally announced the discontinuation of the NX system, major retailers showed the NX1 as being "out of stock" around April 2016.

== Features ==
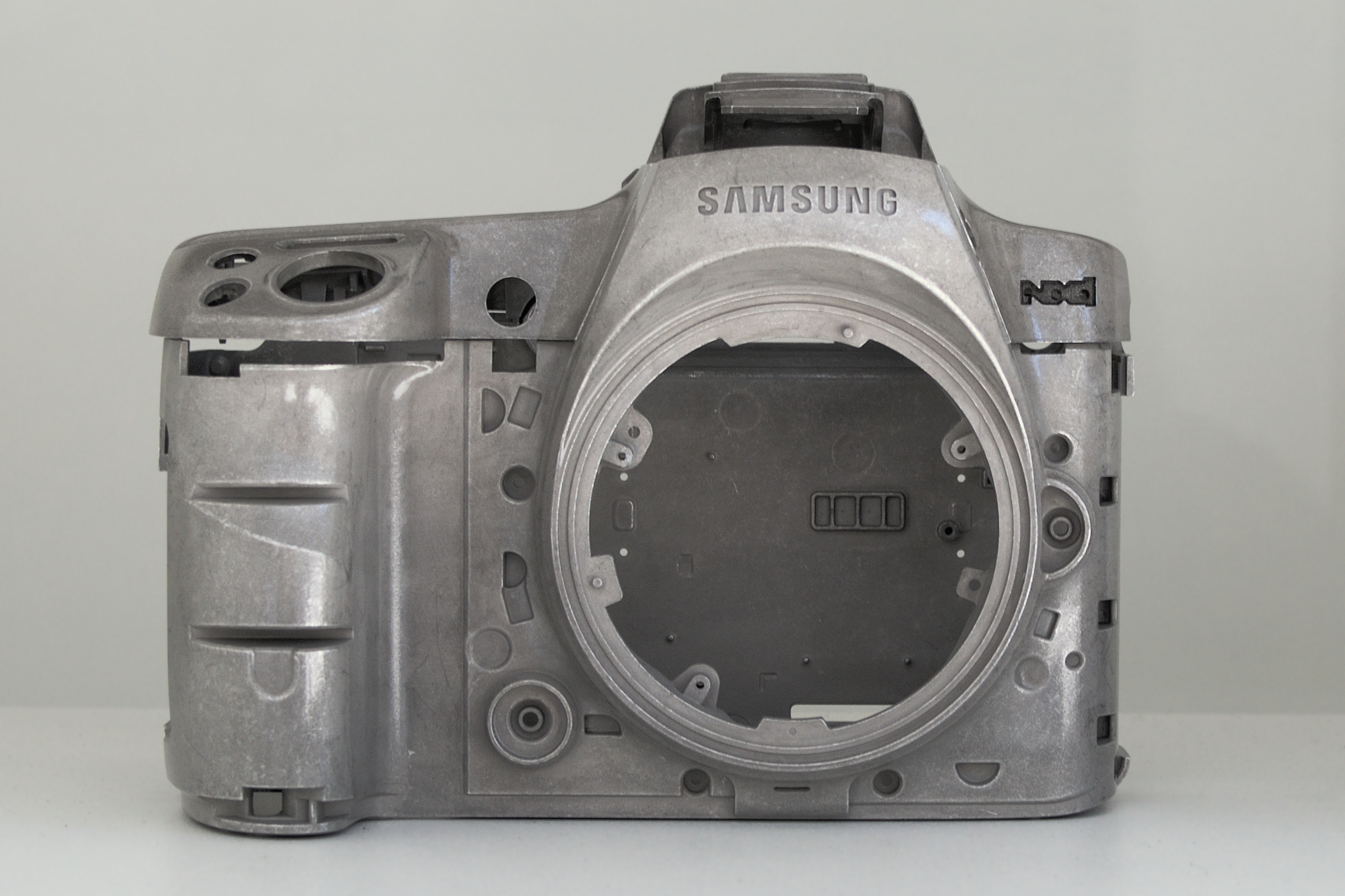
The magnesium alloy chassis of the NX1

The NX1 uses Tizen OS as its main operating system and has 4k video recording. The NX1 has a weather-resistant magnesium alloy body, 3" tilting Super AMOLED touchscreen display, 2.36M dot OLED EVF with 5ms lag, LCD info display on top of camera, built-in 802.11ac Wi-Fi and Bluetooth, USB 3.0 interface, Hybrid AF system with 205 phase-detect points covering 90% of the frame, and 15 fps burst shooting with continuous autofocus. It can output 4:2:2 8-bit 4K video over HDMI, has context-sensitive adaptive noise reduction, stripe pattern AF illuminator with 15m range and optional battery grip. It was the first commercially available camera featuring a back-illuminated APS-C sized sensor.

Level	2010		2011	2012	2013		2014	2015
High-End								NX1
Advanced	NX10		NX11	NX20			NX30	
Mid-range		NX100	NX200	NX210	NX300		NX300M	NX500
Mid-range							Galaxy NX	
Upper-entry						NX2000	NX3000	NX3300
Entry-level	NX5			NX1000	NX1100			
Compact-entry							NX mini	NX mini 2
