= Samsung NX300 =

Digital camera model

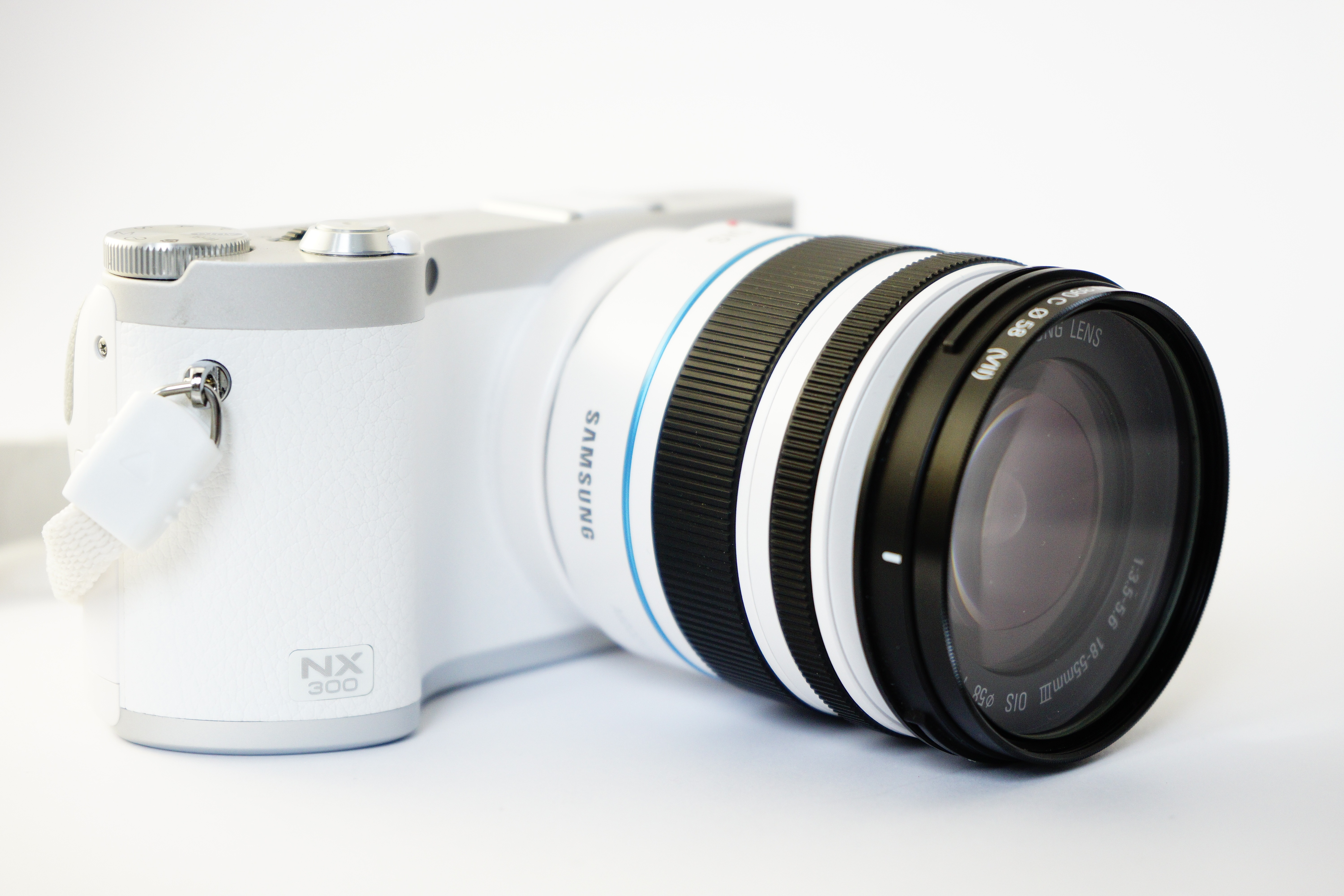

Overview
- Maker: Samsung
- Type: Mirrorless camera

Lens
- Lens mount: Samsung NX

Sensor/medium
- Sensor type: CMOS
- Sensor size: 23.5 x 15.7mm (APS-C type)
- Sensor maker: Samsung
- Maximum resolution: 5472 x 3648 (20 megapixels)
- Recording medium: SD, SDHC or SDXC memory card
- Storage media: SD

Focusing
- Focus: Hybrid autofocus
- Focus areas: 247 focus points

Shutter
- Shutter: Electronically controlled vertical-run focal plane shutter
- Shutter speeds: 1/6000s to 30s
- Continuous shooting: 8.6 frames per second

Image processing
- Image processor: DRIMe IV
- White balance: Yes

General
- Video recording: 1.920 x 1.080 (16:9) 60p 1.920 x 1.080 (16:9) 30p 1.280 x 720 (16:9) 60p 1.280 x 720 (16:9) 30p MPG4
- LCD screen: 3.3 inches OLED with 768,000 dots
- Battery: Samsung BP1130 (Li-Ion)
- Dimensions: 122 x 64 x 41mm (4.8 x 2.52 x 1.61 inches)
- Weight: 331 g (12 oz) including battery

The Samsung NX300 is a mirrorless interchangeable lens digital camera a part of Samsung NX series and a successor to Samsung NX210. It was announced in Jan 2013 along with 45mm f/1.8 2D/3D lens and is the first single-lens system capable of capturing 3D photos or Full HD movies (See Stereo camera#Use of one camera and one lens).

In 2013 NX300 was named the best advanced mirrorless camera by TIPA (Best CSC Advanced, 2013).

== Features ==
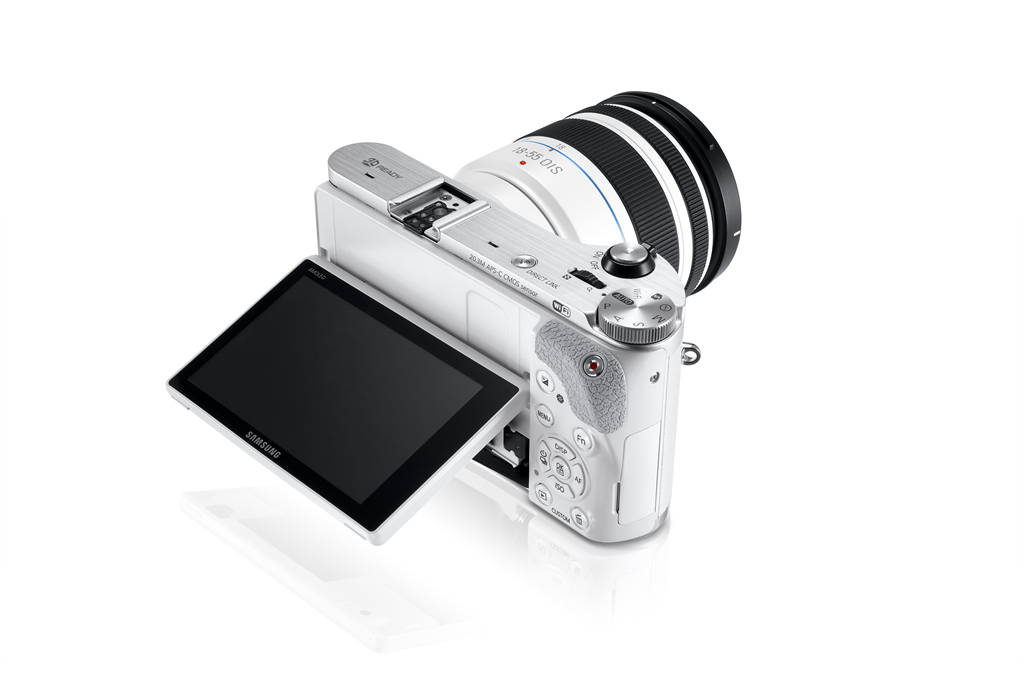

- 20.3 megapixel APS-C CMOS image sensor
- Hybrid Contrast-detection/Phase detection autofocus
- ISO 100-25600 (with Auto-ISO mode and minimum shutter speed setting)
- 3.31” tilting touch-sensitive AMOLED display
- 1080p 60 HD video recording with built-in mic (stereo)
- Built-in WiFi and NFC connectivity

| Level | 2010 | | 2011 | 2012 | 2013 | | 2014 | 2015 |
| High-End | | | | | | | | NX1 |
| Advanced | NX10 | | NX11 | NX20 | | | NX30 | |
| Mid-range | | NX100 | NX200 | NX210 | NX300 | | NX300M | NX500 |
| Mid-range | | | | | | | Galaxy NX | |
| Upper-entry | | | | | | NX2000 | NX3000 | NX3300 |
| Entry-level | NX5 | | | NX1000 | NX1100 | | | |
| Compact-entry | | | | | | | NX mini | NX mini 2 |
