= Samsung NX-mount =

Lens mount

The Samsung NX-mount is the lens mount used on NX series mirrorless interchangeable lens cameras by Samsung. The mount was first implemented in the Samsung NX10, and Samsung initially referred to the NX line as 'hybrid digital cameras', citing their combination of attributes of both DSLR and compact cameras.

The mount is designed for APS-C image sensors, with a 1.54x crop factor. Optical image stabilization is featured on some of the lenses, indicated by an "OIS" marking. Automatic focusing on NX lenses is handled by a dedicated electric motor built into the lens.

Samsung NX lenses (with some early exceptions) include i-Function (iFn), which allows control of various camera settings via a ring and button on the lens. NX5 and NX10 cameras support iFn since firmware 1.10 and 1.20 respectively, while all subsequent models support iFn natively.

== NX lenses ==
Samsung NX lenses are listed in the following sortable table.

Focal length	35mm EFL	Angle of view	Design				Mark	Features						Series (Note: Samsung has several lens classes, according to intended function and prospective consumer: Carry (compact); Optima (mainstream); Omnia (multipurpose); Premium (enthusiast/professional))	Filter size
Focal length	35mm EFL	Angle of view	Max. Aperture	E/G (Note: Lens construction, consisting of: E: number of elements; G: number of cemented groups; A: number of aspherical elements; ED: number of "extra-low dispersion" elements; XHR: number of "extreme high refractive" elements)	Size (Note: Listed as maximum diameter × length)	Weight	Mark	Macro	VCM (Note: "Voice Coil Motor" uses linear motion for focusing)	SSA (Note: "Supersonic Actuator" focusing motor, enables full-time manual focus override)	OIS (Note: "Optical Image Stabilizer" (moving-element type))	Pancake (Note: "Pancake" type compact lens)	iFn (Note: "iFunction", which allows various settings (such as aperture, shutter speed, ISO, and white balance) to be previewed and controlled with a button and ring on the lens)	Series	Filter size
10mm Fisheye	15.4mm	180°	f/3.5	7E/5G	58.8×26.3 mm (2.31×1.04 in)	72 g (2.5 oz)		No	No	No	No	Yes	Yes	Carry	N/A
12-24mm	18.5-37mm	99-60.7°	f/4-5.6	10E/8G	63.5×65.5 mm (2.50×2.58 in)	208 g (7.3 oz)		No	No	No	No	No	Yes	Omnia	58mm
16mm	24.6mm	83°	f/2.4	7E/6G (2A)	61.5×24 mm (2.42×0.94 in)	90 g (3.2 oz)		No	No	No	No	Yes	Yes	Carry	43mm
16-50mm	24.6-77mm	82.6-31.4°	f/2–2.8	18E/12G	81×96.5 mm (3.19×3.80 in)	622 g (21.9 oz)		No	No	Yes	Yes	No	Yes	Premium	72mm
16-50mm	24.6-77mm	82.6-31.4°	f/3.5–5.6	9E/8G	64.8×31 mm (2.55×1.22 in)	111 g (3.9 oz)		No	No	No	Yes	Yes	Yes	Carry	43mm
16-80mm (Note: Announced but never released)	24.6-123mm	82.6-19.9°	f/3.5–4.5	n/a	n/a	n/a		No	Yes	No	Yes	No	Yes	n/a	n/a
18-55mm	27.7-84.6mm	75.9-28.7°	f/3.5–5.6	12E/9G	63×65.1 mm (2.48×2.56 in)	204 g (7.2 oz)		No	No	No	Yes	No	No	Optima	58mm
18-55mm	27.7-84.6mm	75.9-28.7°	f/3.5–5.6	12E/9G	63×65.1 mm (2.48×2.56 in)	204 g (7.2 oz)	II/III	No	No	No	Yes	No	Yes	Optima	58mm
18-200mm	27.7-308mm	76-8°	f/3.5–6.3	18E/13G (3A, 2ED)	72×105.5 mm (2.83×4.15 in)	549 g (19.4 oz)		No	Yes	No	Yes	No	Yes	Omnia	67mm
20mm	30.8mm (35mm raw)	70°	f/2.8	6E/4G (1A)	62.2×24.5 mm (2.45×0.96 in)	73 g (2.6 oz)		No	No	No	No	Yes	Yes	Carry	43mm
20-50mm	30.8-77mm	70-31°	f/3.5-5.6	9E/8G	63.2×39.8 mm (2.49×1.57 in)	119 g (4.2 oz)		No	No	No	No	No	Yes	Carry	40.5mm
20-50mm	30.8-77mm	70-31°	f/3.5-5.6	9E/8G	63.2×39.8 mm (2.49×1.57 in)	119 g (4.2 oz)	II	No	No	No	No	No	Yes	Carry	40.5mm
30mm	46.2mm (50mm raw)	50°	f/2	5E/5G (1A)	61.5×21.5 mm (2.42×0.85 in)	85 g (3.0 oz)		No	No	No	No	Yes	No	Carry	43mm
45mm	69.2mm	34.7°	f/1.8	7E/6G	62×44.5 mm (2.44×1.75 in)	115 g (4.1 oz)		No	No	No	No	No	Yes	Premium	43mm
45mm	69.2mm	34.7°	f/1.8 (2D) f/3.5 (3D)	7E/6G	62×44.5 mm (2.44×1.75 in)	122 g (4.3 oz)	2D/3D (Note: The 45mm F1.8 2D/3D lens has the same construction but features a switch to enable 2D or 3D mode, enabling the recording of 3D videos)	No	No	No	No	No	Yes	Premium	43mm
50-150mm	77-231mm	31.7-10.8°	f/2.8	20E/13G (4ED, 1XHR)	81×154 mm (3.2×6.1 in)	915 g (32.3 oz)		No	No	Yes	Yes	No	Yes	Premium	72mm
50-200mm	77-308mm	31-8°	f/4–5.6	17E/13G	70×100.5 mm (2.76×3.96 in)	406 g (14.3 oz)		No	No	No	Yes	No	No	Optima	52mm
50-200mm	77-308mm	31-8°	f/4–5.6	17E/13G	70×100.5 mm (2.76×3.96 in)	406 g (14.3 oz)	II / III	No	No	No	Yes	No	Yes	Optima	52mm
60mm	92.4mm	26°	f/2.8	12E/9G (1A, 1ED)	73.5×84 mm (2.89×3.31 in)	389 g (13.7 oz)		Yes	No	Yes	Yes	No	Yes	Optima	52mm
85mm	130.9mm	19°	f/1.4	10E/8G (1ED)	79×92.2 mm (3.11×3.63 in)	699 g (24.7 oz)		No	No	Yes	No	No	Yes	Premium	67mm
300mm	462mm	5°20	f/2.8	n/a	n/a	n/a		No	No	Yes	Yes	No	Yes	Premium	n/a

Table Notes

Samyang Optics (Bower, Rokinon, Walimex) lenses for NX-mount include:

- MF 8mm f/2.8 Fisheye (35mm EFL = 12mm)
- MF 8mm f/3.5 Fisheye (35mm EFL = 12mm)
- MF 8mm T3.8 Fisheye (35mm EFL = 12mm)
- MF 10mm f/2.8 (35mm EFL = 15mm)
- MF 12mm f/2.0 (35mm EFL = 18mm)
- MF 14mm f/2.8 (35mm EFL = 21mm)
- MF 14mm T3.1 (35mm EFL = 21mm)
- MF 24mm f/1.4 (35mm EFL = 38mm)
- MF 24mm T1.5 (35mm EFL = 38mm)
- MF 35mm f/1.4 (35mm EFL = 54mm)
- MF 85mm f/1.4 (35mm EFL = 130mm)

== Lenses roadmap ==
Samsung announced plans to launch a 16-80mm f/3.5-4.5 OIS VCM (Movie Home) in December 2011.

Three manual focus lenses were announced by Samyang Optics in June, 2010, 8mm f/3.5 Fisheye; 14mm f/2.8 and the 85mm f/1.4. At photokina 2010 event (September 2010), Samyang Optics announced the new 35mm f/1.4 available for NX-mount.

Lensbaby announced the availability of its Composer Pro for NX mount with different optics.

== Adaptation to non-NX lenses ==
An adapter for the K-mount lenses has been announced (ED-MA9NXK) by Samsung, and various adapters are produced by Novoflex to adapt lenses made for Nikon F-mount, Canon FD lens mount, Minolta SR mount, Minolta AF, Sony A-mount, Leica R bayonet, Pentax K-mount, Olympus OM system, M42 lens mount, and T2 mount. Various adapters are also available from Kiwifotos.

Due to long flange distance compared to other mirrorless systems, making a telecompressor adapter was more difficult, but in 2017 a crowdsourced NX-L appeared.

== Compared with other mounts ==
Mount	Flange focal distance, mm	Ext. diameter, mm	Frame size, mm
Samsung NX-mount	25.5	42	23.5×15.7
Pentax K_{AF2}-mount	45.5	44	36.0×24.0
Panasonic/Olympus μ4/3	20	38	17.3×13
Sony E-mount	18	46.1	35.9×24.0
Leica M-mount	27.8	44	36.0×24.0
Fujifilm X-mount	17.7	44	23.6×15.6
Canon EF-M-mount	18	47	22.3×14.9

== See also ==
- Samsung NX-M-mount
