= List of lightest mirrorless cameras =

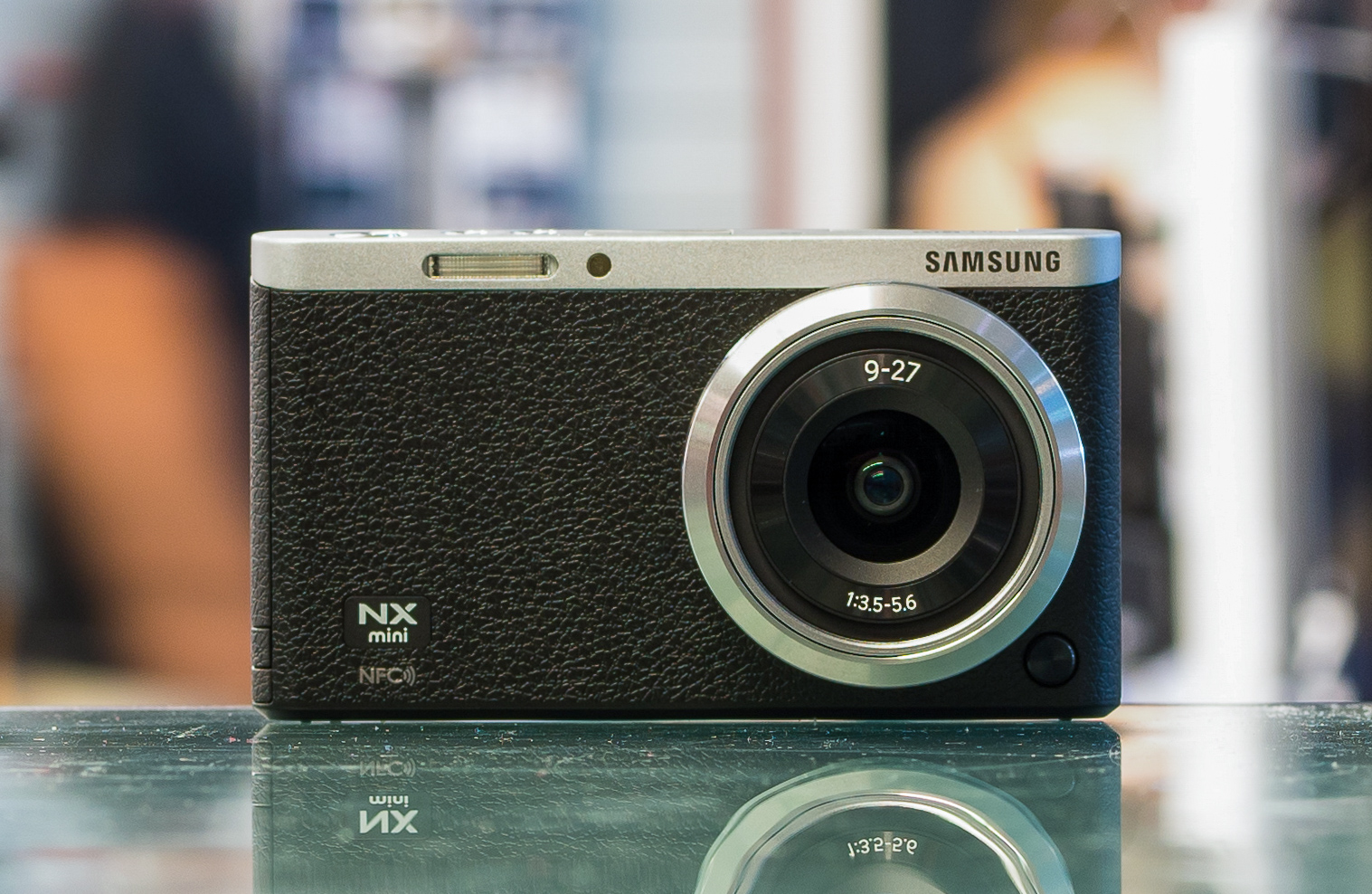
Samsung NX mini

This is a list of the lightest and smallest mirrorless digital cameras ever released with an interchangeable lens mount, excluding smartphones and action cameras, sorted by weight including battery and memory card.

Nearly all the lightest models have been discontinued, as smartphone cameras have rapidly improved and taken over their market. Some high-end smartphones now exceed several of these models in weight, sensor size, and functionality. (For example, an iPhone 15 Pro Max weighs 221 g, and a Galaxy S24 Ultra weighs 233 g.)

The lightest mirrorless cameras in production today are the Olympus E-P7 at 337 g and Sony ZV-E10 at 343 g. The lightest models in production with an electronic viewfinder (EVF) are the Panasonic G100D at 346 g and Canon R100 at 356 g. With the exception of the E-P7's in-body image stabilization (IBIS), these models eschew certain hardware features, such as IBIS and weather sealing, that add weight. Most newer models include one or more of these features, as the bulk of the mirrorless camera sector has moved upmarket in the face of increasing competition from smartphones.

Mirrorless cameras that weigh less than 250 grams including battery and memory card
Model	Weight	Width	Height	Depth	Lens mount	Crop factor	Pixel count	IBIS	EVF	Release year	Availability
Samsung NX mini	196 g	110 mm	62 mm	23 mm	NX-M	2.7	20 MP	No	No	2014	Discontinued
Pentax Q	200 g	98 mm	58 mm	31 mm	Q	5.6	12 MP	Yes	No	2011	Discontinued
Pentax Q10	200 g	102 mm	58 mm	34 mm	Q	5.6	12 MP	Yes	No	2012	Discontinued
Pentax Q7	200 g	102 mm	58 mm	34 mm	Q	4.6	12 MP	Yes	No	2013	Discontinued
Pentax Q-S1	203 g	105 mm	58 mm	34 mm	Q	4.6	12 MP	Yes	No	2014	Discontinued
Panasonic GM1	204 g	99 mm	55 mm	30 mm	MFT	2.0	16 MP	No	No	2013	Discontinued
Panasonic GM5	211 g	99 mm	60 mm	36 mm	MFT	2.0	16 MP	No	Yes	2014	Discontinued
Z CAM E1	217 g	75 mm	56 mm	50 mm	MFT	2.0	16 MP	No	No	2015	Discontinued
Nikon S2	230 g	101 mm	61 mm	29 mm	1	2.7	14 MP	No	No	2014	Discontinued
Nikon J5	231 g	98 mm	60 mm	32 mm	1	2.7	21 MP	No	No	2015	Discontinued
Nikon J4	232 g	100 mm	60 mm	29 mm	1	2.7	18 MP	No	No	2014	Discontinued
Nikon J1	234 g	106 mm	61 mm	30 mm	1	2.7	10 MP	No	No	2011	Discontinued
Nikon J2	238 g	106 mm	61 mm	30 mm	1	2.7	10 MP	No	No	2012	Discontinued
Nikon S1	240 g	102 mm	61 mm	30 mm	1	2.7	10 MP	No	No	2013	Discontinued
Nikon J3	244 g	101 mm	61 mm	29 mm	1	2.7	14 MP	No	No	2013	Discontinued

Of these ultracompact models, the Micro Four Thirds cameras (Panasonic GM1, Panasonic GM5, and Z CAM E1) have by far the largest sensor, with an area nearly twice as large as Samsung's and Nikon's "1-inch" sensors and nearly eight times as large as the Pentax Q's sensor. On the other hand, Pentax was able to include in-body image stabilization in their Q-series bodies, because of the tiny sensors.

== Lightest mirrorless cameras with a Four Thirds sensor ==
Four Thirds mirrorless cameras that weigh less than 300 grams including battery and memory card
Model	Weight	Width	Height	Depth	Pixel count	IBIS	EVF	Release year	Availability
Panasonic GM1	204 g	99 mm	55 mm	30 mm	16 MP	No	No	2013	Discontinued
Panasonic GM5	211 g	99 mm	60 mm	36 mm	16 MP	No	Yes	2014	Discontinued
Z CAM E1	217 g	75 mm	56 mm	50 mm	16 MP	No	No	2015	Discontinued
Panasonic GF3	264 g	108 mm	67 mm	33 mm	12 MP	No	No	2011	Discontinued
Olympus E-PM1	265 g	110 mm	64 mm	34 mm	12 MP	Yes	No	2011	Discontinued
Panasonic GF7 / GF8	266 g	107 mm	65 mm	33 mm	16 MP	No	No	2015	Discontinued
Panasonic GF5	267 g	108 mm	67 mm	37 mm	12 MP	No	No	2012	Discontinued
Olympus E-PM2	269 g	110 mm	64 mm	34 mm	16 MP	Yes	No	2012	Discontinued
Panasonic GF9 / GX800 / GX850	269 g	107 mm	65 mm	33 mm	16 MP	No	No	2017	Discontinued
Panasonic GF10 / GF90 / GX880	270 g	107 mm	65 mm	33 mm	16 MP	No	No	2018	Discontinued
YI M1	281 g	114 mm	64 mm	34 mm	20 MP	No	No	2016	Discontinued

All these models have a Micro Four Thirds lens mount and a crop factor of 2.

The lightest mirrorless cameras in production today with a Four Thirds sensor are the Olympus E-P7 at 337 g and Panasonic G100D at 346 g.

== Lightest mirrorless cameras with an APS-C sensor ==
APS-C mirrorless cameras that weigh less than 400 grams including battery and memory card
Model	Weight	Width	Height	Depth	Lens mount	Crop factor	Pixel count	IBIS	EVF	Release year	Availability
Samsung NX200	(Note: 220 g body + 40 g battery and memory card.)260 g	117 mm	63 mm	37 mm	NX	1.5	20 MP	No	No	2011	Discontinued
Samsung NX210	(Note: 222 g body + 40 g battery and memory card.)262 g	117 mm	63 mm	37 mm	NX	1.5	20 MP	No	No	2012	Discontinued
Samsung NX1000	262 g	114 mm	63 mm	38 mm	NX	1.5	20 MP	No	No	2012	Discontinued
Samsung NX1100	262 g	114 mm	63 mm	38 mm	NX	1.5	20 MP	No	No	2013	Discontinued
Samsung NX2000	(Note: 228 g body + 40 g battery and memory card.)268 g	119 mm	65 mm	36 mm	NX	1.5	20 MP	No	No	2013	Discontinued
Sony NEX-3N	269 g	110 mm	62 mm	35 mm	E	1.5	16 MP	No	No	2013	Discontinued
Sony NEX-5N	269 g	111 mm	59 mm	38 mm	E	1.5	16 MP	No	No	2011	Discontinued
Sony α5000	269 g	110 mm	63 mm	36 mm	E	1.5	20 MP	No	No	2014	Discontinued
Samsung NX3000	(Note: 230 g body + 40 g battery and memory card.)270 g	117 mm	66 mm	39 mm	NX	1.5	20 MP	No	No	2014	Discontinued
Samsung NX3300	270 g	117 mm	66 mm	39 mm	NX	1.5	20 MP	No	No	2015	Discontinued
Canon M2	274 g	105 mm	65 mm	32 mm	EF-M	1.6	18 MP	No	No	2013	Discontinued
Sony NEX-5R	276 g	111 mm	59 mm	39 mm	E	1.5	16 MP	No	No	2012	Discontinued
Sony NEX-5T	276 g	111 mm	59 mm	39 mm	E	1.5	16 MP	No	No	2013	Discontinued
Sony NEX-C3	283 g	110 mm	60 mm	33 mm	E	1.5	16 MP	No	No	2011	Discontinued
Sony α5100	283 g	110 mm	63 mm	36 mm	E	1.5	24 MP	No	No	2014	Discontinued
Sony NEX-5	287 g	111 mm	59 mm	38 mm	E	1.5	14 MP	No	No	2010	Discontinued
Sony NEX-3	297 g	117 mm	63 mm	33 mm	E	1.5	14 MP	No	No	2010	Discontinued
Canon M	298 g	109 mm	67 mm	32 mm	EF-M	1.6	18 MP	No	No	2012	Discontinued
Canon M200	299 g	108 mm	67 mm	35 mm	EF-M	1.6	24 MP	No	No	2019	Discontinued
Canon M10	301 g	108 mm	67 mm	35 mm	EF-M	1.6	18 MP	No	No	2015	Discontinued
Canon M100	302 g	108 mm	67 mm	35 mm	EF-M	1.6	24 MP	No	No	2017	Discontinued
Fujifilm X-A7	320 g	119 mm	68 mm	41 mm	X	1.5	24 MP	No	No	2019	Discontinued
Fujifilm X-M1	330 g	117 mm	67 mm	39 mm	X	1.5	16 MP	No	No	2013	Discontinued
Fujifilm X-A1	330 g	117 mm	67 mm	40 mm	X	1.5	16 MP	No	No	2013	Discontinued
Fujifilm X-A10	331 g	117 mm	67 mm	40 mm	X	1.5	16 MP	No	No	2016	Discontinued
Fujifilm X-E3	337 g	121 mm	74 mm	43 mm	X	1.5	24 MP	No	Yes	2017	Discontinued
Fujifilm X-A3	339 g	117 mm	67 mm	40 mm	X	1.5	24 MP	No	No	2016	Discontinued
Sony ZV-E10	343 g	115 mm	64 mm	45 mm	E	1.5	24 MP	No	No	2021	Current
Sony α6000	344 g	120 mm	67 mm	45 mm	E	1.5	24 MP	No	Yes	2014	Discontinued
Sony NEX-6	345 g	120 mm	67 mm	43 mm	E	1.5	16 MP	No	Yes	2012	Discontinued
Fujifilm X-A20	348 g	117 mm	67 mm	40 mm	X	1.5	16 MP	No	No	2018	Discontinued
Fujifilm X-A2	350 g	117 mm	67 mm	40 mm	X	1.5	16 MP	No	No	2015	Discontinued
Sony NEX-7	350 g	120 mm	67 mm	43 mm	E	1.5	24 MP	No	Yes	2011	Discontinued
Fujifilm X-E2	350 g	129 mm	75 mm	37 mm	X	1.5	24 MP	No	Yes	2013	Discontinued
Fujifilm X-E1	350 g	129 mm	75 mm	38 mm	X	1.5	16 MP	No	Yes	2012	Discontinued
Fujifilm X-M5	355 g	119 mm	67 mm	38 mm	X	1.5	26 MP	No	No	2024	Current
Canon R100	356 g	116 mm	86 mm	69 mm	RF	1.6	24 MP	No	Yes	2023	Current
Fujifilm X-A5	361 g	117 mm	68 mm	40 mm	X	1.5	24 MP	No	No	2018	Discontinued
Fujifilm X-E4	364 g	121 mm	73 mm	33 mm	X	1.5	26 MP	No	Yes	2021	Discontinued
Canon M3	366 g	111 mm	68 mm	44 mm	EF-M	1.6	24 MP	No	No	2015	Discontinued
Canon R50V	370 g	119 mm	74 mm	45 mm	RF	1.6	24 MP	No	No	2025	Current
Canon R50	375 g	116 mm	86 mm	69 mm	RF	1.6	24 MP	No	Yes	2023	Current
Sony ZV-E10 II	377 g	115 mm	68 mm	54 mm	E	1.5	26 MP	No	No	2024	Current
Fujifilm X-T30 III	378 g	118 mm	83 mm	47 mm	X	1.5	26 MP	No	Yes	2025	Current
Canon M50	387 g	116 mm	88 mm	59 mm	EF-M	1.6	24 MP	No	Yes	2018	Discontinued
Canon M50 Mark II	387 g	116 mm	88 mm	59 mm	EF-M	1.6	24 MP	No	Yes	2020	Discontinued
Canon M6	390 g	112 mm	68 mm	45 mm	EF-M	1.6	24 MP	No	No	2017	Discontinued
Sony α6100	396 g	120 mm	67 mm	59 mm	E	1.5	24 MP	No	Yes	2019	Current

The lightest interchangeable-lens mirrorless cameras in production today with an APS-C sensor are the Sony ZV-E10 at 343 g, Fujifilm X-M5 at 355 g, and Canon R100 at 356 g. The lightest Nikon model is the Z30 at 405 g.

The lightest fixed-lens cameras ever released with an APS-C sensor are the Ricoh GR series, of which the Ricoh GR IV and Ricoh GR IIIx are in production today and weigh 262 g.

== Lightest mirrorless cameras with a full frame sensor ==
Full-frame mirrorless cameras that weigh less than 550 grams including battery and memory card
Model	Weight	Width	Height	Depth	Lens mount	Crop factor	Pixel count	IBIS	EVF	Release year	Availability
Sigma fp	422 g	113 mm	70 mm	45 mm	L	1.0	24 MP	No	Opt. (Note: Optional accessory that weighs 114 g.)	2019	Discontinued
Sigma fp L	427 g	113 mm	70 mm	45 mm	L	1.0	60 MP	No	Opt.	2021	Discontinued
Sigma BF	446 g	130 mm	73 mm	37 mm	L	1.0	24.5 MP	No	No	2026	Current
Sigma FP2	460 g	113 mm	70 mm	42 mm	L	1.0	24 MP	No	Opt.	2025	Current
Canon R8	461 g	133 mm	86 mm	70 mm	RF	1.0	24 MP	No	Yes	2023	Current
Sony α7R	465 g	127 mm	94 mm	55 mm	E	1.0	36 MP	No	Yes	2013	Discontinued
Sony α7	474 g	127 mm	94 mm	55 mm	E	1.0	24 MP	No	Yes	2013	Discontinued
Sony ZV-E1	483 g	121 mm	72 mm	54 mm	E	1.0	12 MP	Yes	No	2023	Current
Canon RP	485 g	133 mm	85 mm	70 mm	RF	1.0	26 MP	No	Yes	2019	Current
Panasonic S9	486 g	124 mm	74 mm	47 mm	L	1.0	24 MP	Yes	No	2024	Current
Sony α7S	489 g	127 mm	94 mm	55 mm	E	1.0	12 MP	No	Yes	2014	Discontinued
Sony α7C	509 g	124 mm	71 mm	60 mm	E	1.0	24 MP	Yes	Yes	2020	Current
Sony α7C II	514 g	124 mm	71 mm	63 mm	E	1.0	33 MP	Yes	Yes	2023	Current
Sony α7CR	515 g	124 mm	71 mm	63 mm	E	1.0	60 MP	Yes	Yes	2023	Current

The lightest Nikon model is the ZR at 630 g (including battery and memory card).

The lightest fixed-lens cameras ever released with a full frame sensor are the Sony RX1 series, of which the Sony RX1R III is in production today and weighs 498 g.

=== Lightest rangefinder cameras with a full frame sensor ===
Full-frame rangefinder cameras that weigh less than 550 grams including battery and memory card
Model	Weight	Width	Height	Depth	Lens mount	Crop factor	Pixel count	IBIS	Release year	Availability
Pixii Max	480 g	138 mm	79 mm	33 mm	M	1.0	24 MP	No	2024	Current
Leica M11	530 g	139 mm	80 mm	39 mm	M	1.0	60 MP	No	2022	Current

All rangefinder cameras (including digital Leica M-series cameras) are technically mirrorless, because they do not contain a mirror. However, rangefinder cameras are usually not considered mirrorless cameras, a differentiation dating back to when they co-existed with SLR film cameras. More specifically, rangefinder cameras lack autofocus and employ a very different manual focusing method involving a rangefinder mechanism with an optical viewfinder. Furthermore, most digital rangefinder cameras (except Leica's recent models) lack live preview, which is sometimes considered a defining feature of mirrorless cameras.

The Leica M EV1 weighs 495 g but does not contain a rangefinder.

== Lightest mirrorless cameras with a medium format sensor ==
Medium format mirrorless cameras that weigh less than 800 grams including battery and memory card
Model	Weight	Width	Height	Depth	Lens mount	Crop factor	Pixel count	IBIS	EVF	Release year	Availability
Hasselblad 907X 100C	(Note: 620 g body + 110 g battery and memory card.)730 g	102 mm	92 mm	84 mm	XCD	0.8	102 MP	No	No	2024	Current
Fujifilm GFX 50R	775 g	161 mm	97 mm	66 mm	G	0.8	51 MP	No	Yes	2018	Discontinued

The lightest fixed-lens camera ever released with a medium format sensor is the Fujifilm GFX100RF at 735 g. It is also the only fixed-lens medium format digital camera with autofocus.

== Lens-style cameras ==
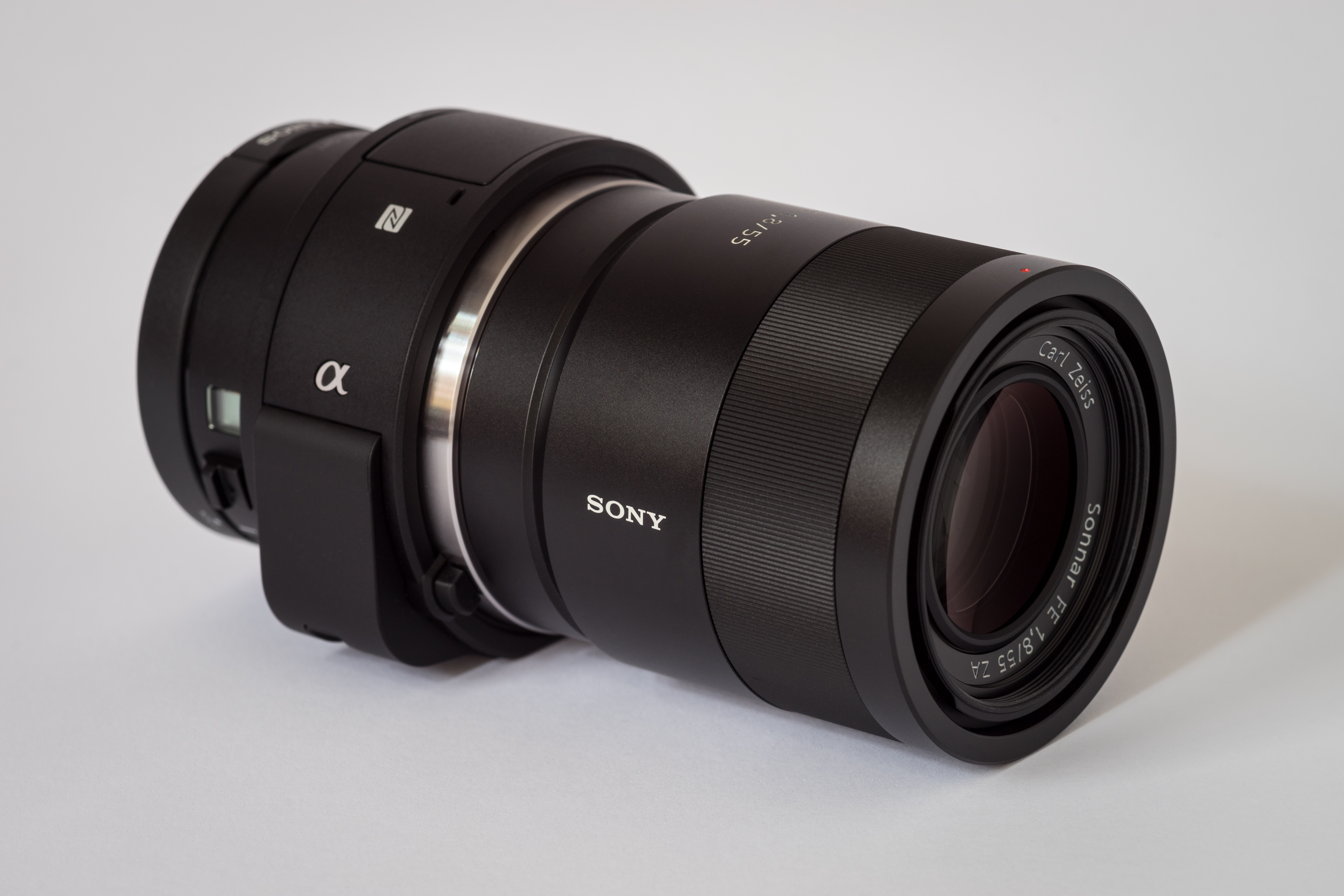
Sony QX1

Lens-style cameras are lighter than all other interchangeable lens cameras with their respective sensor sizes, but they are usually not classified with other mirrorless cameras because they have no screen or viewfinder.

They are designed to be attached to a smartphone so that the phone’s screen can be used as the camera’s display.

Model	Weight	Width	Height	Depth	Lens mount	Crop factor	Pixel count	IBIS	EVF	Release year	Availability
Olympus Air	147 g	57 mm	57 mm	44 mm	MFT	2.0	16 MP	No	No	2015	Discontinued
Sony QX1	216 g	74 mm	70 mm	53 mm	E	1.5	20 MP	No	No	2014	Discontinued

== See also ==
- List of bridge cameras
- List of large sensor fixed-lens cameras
