= Sigma FP2 =

Digital mirrorless camera

Overview
- Maker: Sigma Corporation
- Type: Full-frame mirrorless interchangeable-lens camera
- Released: 11 November 2026; 5 days ago

Lens
- Lens mount: Leica L-mount

Sensor/medium
- Sensor type: BSI-CMOS with Bayer filter
- Sensor size: 35.9 mm × 23.9 mm Full-frame
- Sensor maker: Sony Semiconductor Manufacturing Corporation
- Maximum resolution: 24.5 megapixels
- Film speed: ISO 100–102400 (standard); ISO 6-50 (expand)
- Recording medium: 1 × SD (UHS-II), portable SSD via USB 3.2

Focusing
- Focus: Contrast AF
- Focus areas: 49 points

Exposure/metering
- Exposure: TTL exposure metering
- Exposure modes: Programmed Auto [P] with flexible program; Shutter-Priority Auto [S]; Aperture-Priority Auto [A]; Manual [M]
- Exposure metering: TTL exposure metering

Flash
- Flash: no

Shutter
- Shutter: Electronic shutter
- Shutter speeds: 30s - 1/25600s
- Continuous shooting: 20fps

Viewfinder
- Viewfinder: EVF (opt.)

General
- Video recording: 6K @ 24/25/30/48/50/60p 4K @ 24/25/30/48/50/60p 2K @ 24/25/30/48/50/60/100/120p
- LCD screen: 3.15-inch tilting TFT LCD with touchscreen, 2.1 million dots
- Battery: BP-91
- AV port(s): USB 2 Type-C, USB 3.2 Type-C, HDMI Type-A
- Data port: none
- Dimensions: 112.8×69.9×41.8 mm (4.44×2.75×1.65 in)
- Weight: 376 g (13 oz) (body only)
- Made in: Japan

Chronology
- Predecessor: Sigma fp Sigma BF

The Sigma FP2 is a 24.5-megapixel full-frame mirrorless interchangeable-lens camera made by Sigma. It was publicly announced on October 23, 2026 and launched on November 11, 2026 with a suggested retail price of US$2,199 (body only) at the time.

It has a 24.5-megapixel partially stacked CMOS sensor.

There is an optional Electronic Viewfinder EVF-21.

It was preceded by the Sigma fp and Sigma BF.

== See also ==
- List of smallest mirrorless cameras

Type	Lens	2002	2003	2004	2005	2006	2007	2008	2009	2010	2011	2012	2013	2014	2015	2016	2017	2018	2019	2020	2021	2022	2023	2024	2025	2026
MILC	Full frame																									
MILC	Full frame																									BF
MILC	Full frame																					fp L				
MILC	Full frame																		fp							FP2
MILC	APS-H															SD Quattro H										
MILC	APS-C															SD Quattro										
Compact (Prime lens)	Wide														dp0 Quattro											
Compact (Prime lens)	Wide							DP1		DP1s	DP1x		DP1 Merrill		dp1 Quattro											
Compact (Prime lens)	Normal								DP2	DP2s	DP2x		DP2 Merrill	dp2 Quattro												
Compact (Prime lens)	Tele												DP3 Merrill	dp3 Quattro												
DSLR	APS-C	SD9		SD10				SD14		SD15		SD1	SD1 Merrill													
