= Samsung mount =

Samsung mount may refer to:

- Samsung NX-mount, an APS-C format digital camera mount introduced by Samsung in 2010
- Samsung NX-M-mount, a miniature digital camera mount introduced by Samsung in 2015
- Samsung K-mount, a Pentax K-compatible auto-focus SLR mount used by Samsung APS-C format digital SLRs (GX-1S, GX-1L, etc.) between 2006 and 2008
- Samsung GX-mount, a manual-focus 35mm SLR camera mount used only by the Samsung Kenox GX-1 and Samsung SR4000 between 1998 and 2002
