= Fujinon XF 35mm f/1.4 R =

Fujifilm XF 35mm F1.4 R
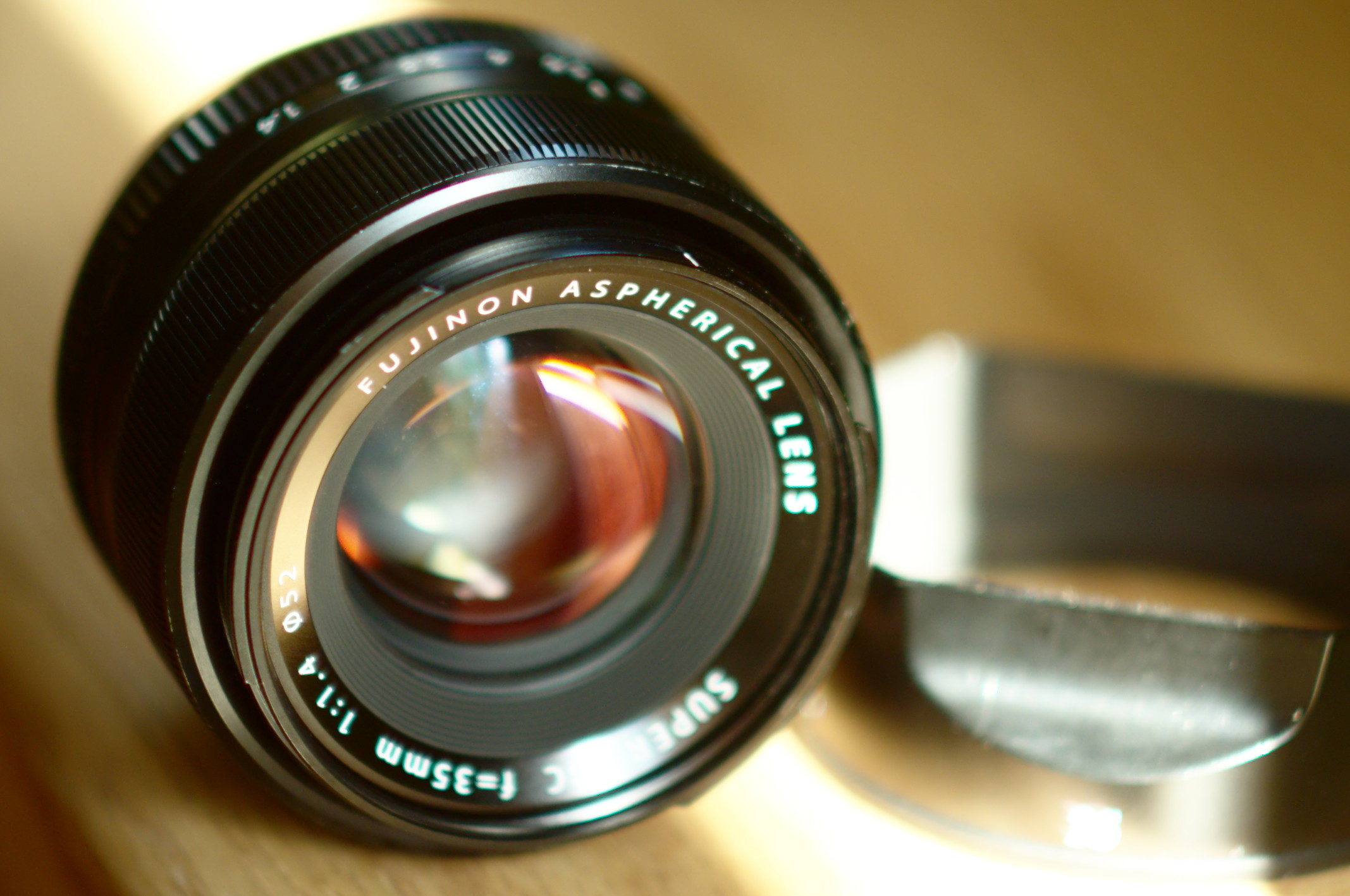
- Maker: Fujifilm
- Lens mount(s): Fujifilm X

Technical data
- Type: Prime
- Focal length: 35mm
- Focal length (35mm equiv.): 53mm
- Aperture (max/min): f/1.4
- Close focus distance: 0.28 metres (0.92 ft)
- Max. magnification: 0.17
- Diaphragm blades: 7, rounded
- Construction: 8 elements in 6 groups

Features
- Weather-sealing: No No
- Lens-based stabilization: No No
- Aperture ring: Yes Yes

Physical
- Max. length: 55 millimetres (2.2 in)
- Diameter: 65 millimetres (2.6 in)
- Weight: 187 grams (0.412 lb)
- Filter diameter: 52mm

History
- Introduction: 2012

The Fujifilm XF 35mm F1.4 R is an interchangeable camera lens announced by Fujifilm on January 9, 2012. As of 2015, it remains one of the widest-aperture 35mm lenses available, giving a normal field of view on Fujifilm's APS-C format digital cameras.

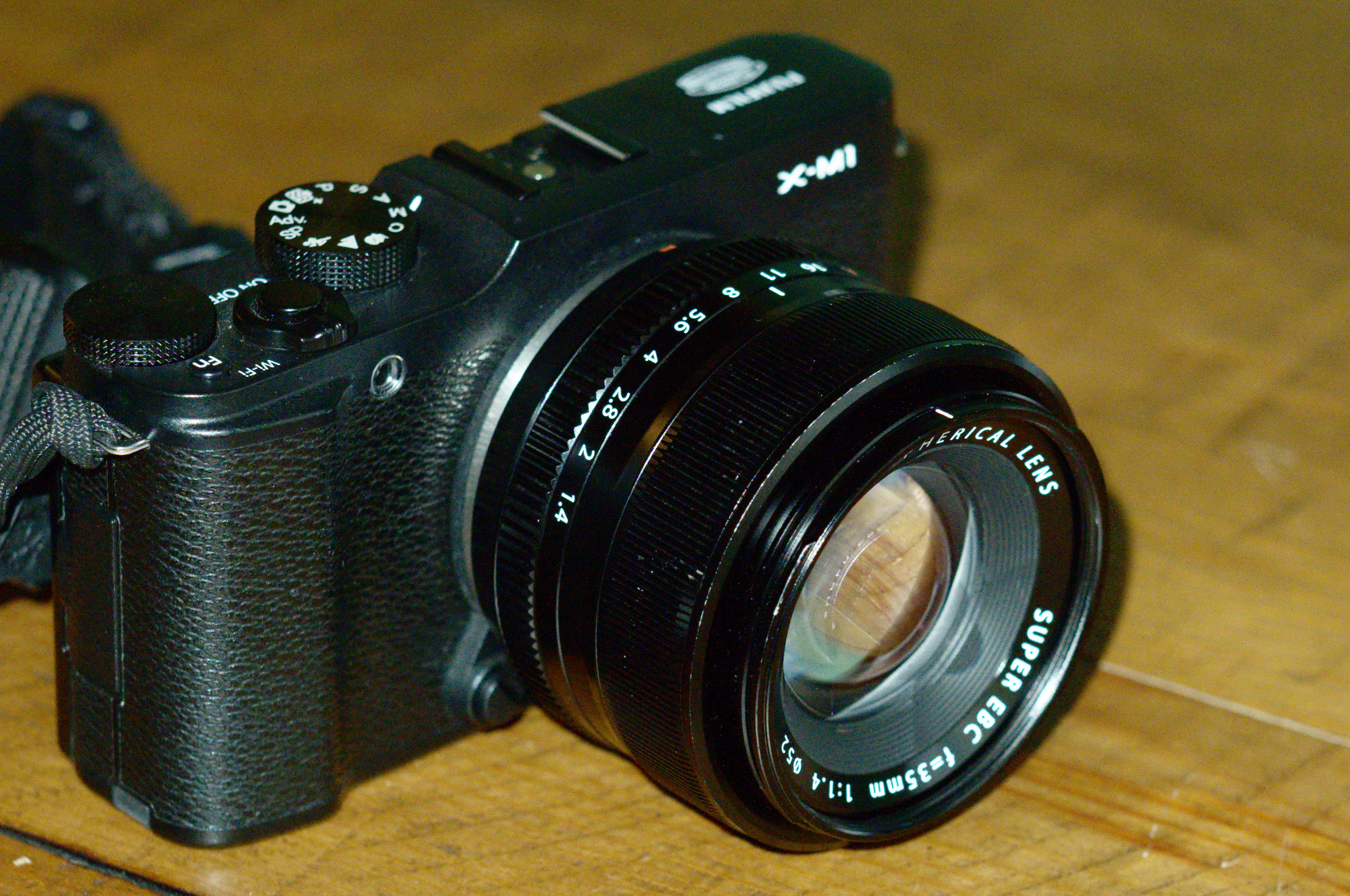
XF 35mm f1.4 R mounted on Fujifilm X-M1
