= NX2000 =

NX2000 may refer to:

- Nissan NX, sports car
- Samsung NX2000, photo camera
