= Sigma fp =

Digital mirrorless camera

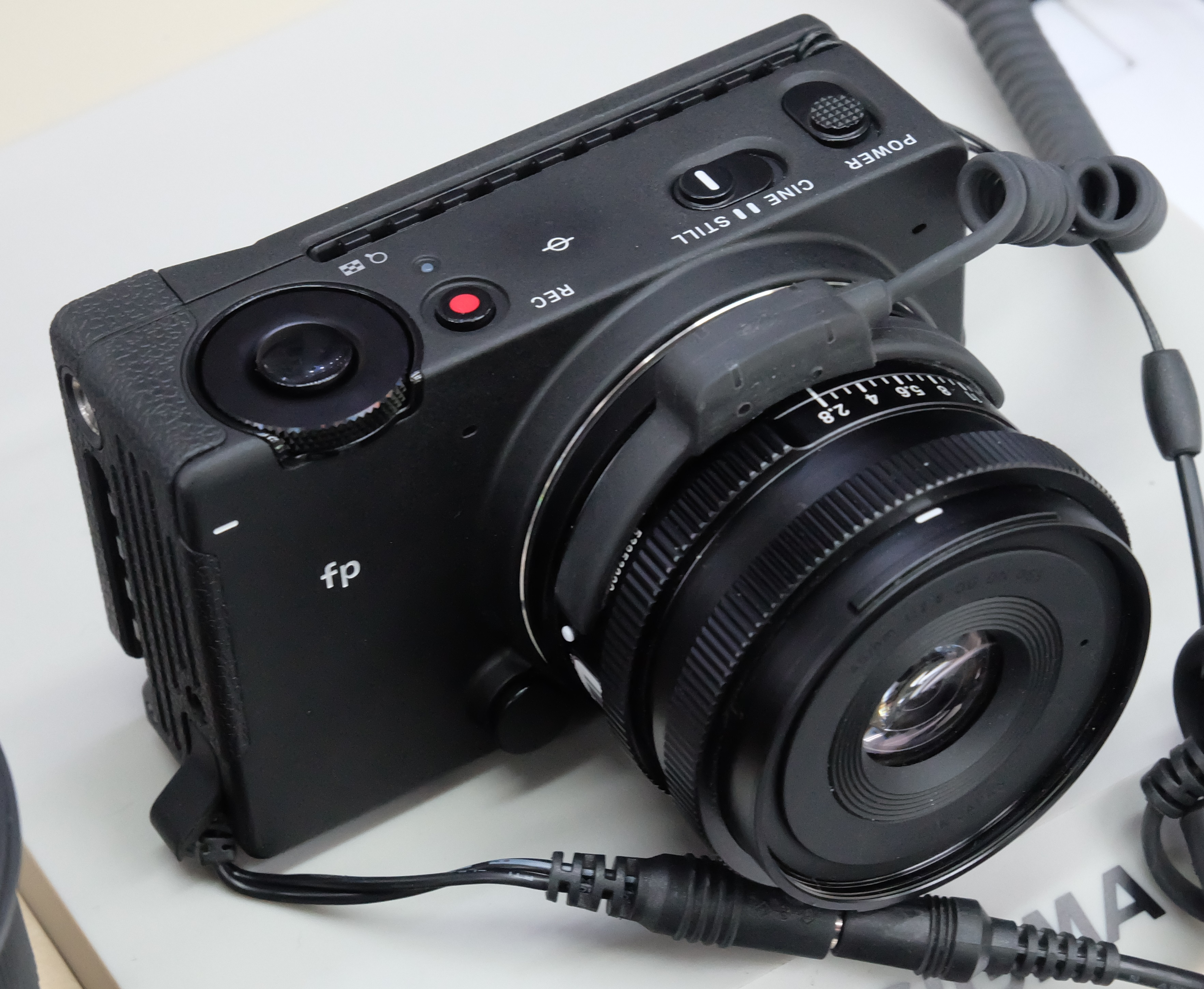

Overview
- Maker: Sigma corporation
- Type: Full-frame mirrorless interchangeable-lens camera
- Released: 25 October 2019; 7 years ago
- Production: 2019–2025

Lens
- Lens mount: Leica L-mount

Sensor/medium
- Sensor type: BSI-CMOS with Bayer filter
- Sensor size: 35.9 mm × 23.9 mm Full-frame
- Sensor maker: Sony Semiconductor Manufacturing Corporation
- Maximum resolution: 6000 x 4000 (24.6 megapixels)
- Film speed: ISO 100–25600 (standard); ISO 6-102400 (expand)
- Recording medium: SD card, portable SSD via USB 3.0

Focusing
- Focus: Contrast AF
- Focus areas: 49 points

Exposure/metering
- Exposure: TTL exposure metering
- Exposure modes: Programmed Auto [P] with flexible program; Shutter-Priority Auto [S]; Aperture Priority Auto [A]; Manual [M]
- Exposure metering: TTL exposure metering

Flash
- Flash: no

Shutter
- Shutter: Electronic shutter
- Shutter speeds: 30s - 1/8000s
- Continuous shooting: 18fps

General
- Video recording: 4K UHD at 24p, Full HD
- LCD screen: 3.15-inch fixed TFT LCD with touchscreen, 2.1 million dots
- Battery: BP-51
- AV port(s): USB3.1 Type-C, HDMI Type-D
- Data port: none
- Dimensions: 112.6×69.9×45.3 mm (4.43×2.75×1.78 in)
- Weight: 370 g (13 oz) (body only)
- Made in: Japan

Chronology
- Successor: Sigma BF; Sigma FP2

The Sigma fp is a 24.6-megapixel full-frame mirrorless interchangeable-lens camera made by Sigma. It was publicly announced in July 2019 and launched on October 25, 2019 with a suggested retail price of US$1,899 (body only) at the time.

The Sigma fp is offered as a body only or in a body-and-lens kit package with a Sigma 45mm F2.8 DG DN prime lens at a suggested retail price of US$2,199.

The Sigma fp won the Good Design Gold Award in 2019.

The Sigma fp and fp L were discontinued in June 2025, slightly after the release of the Sigma BF.

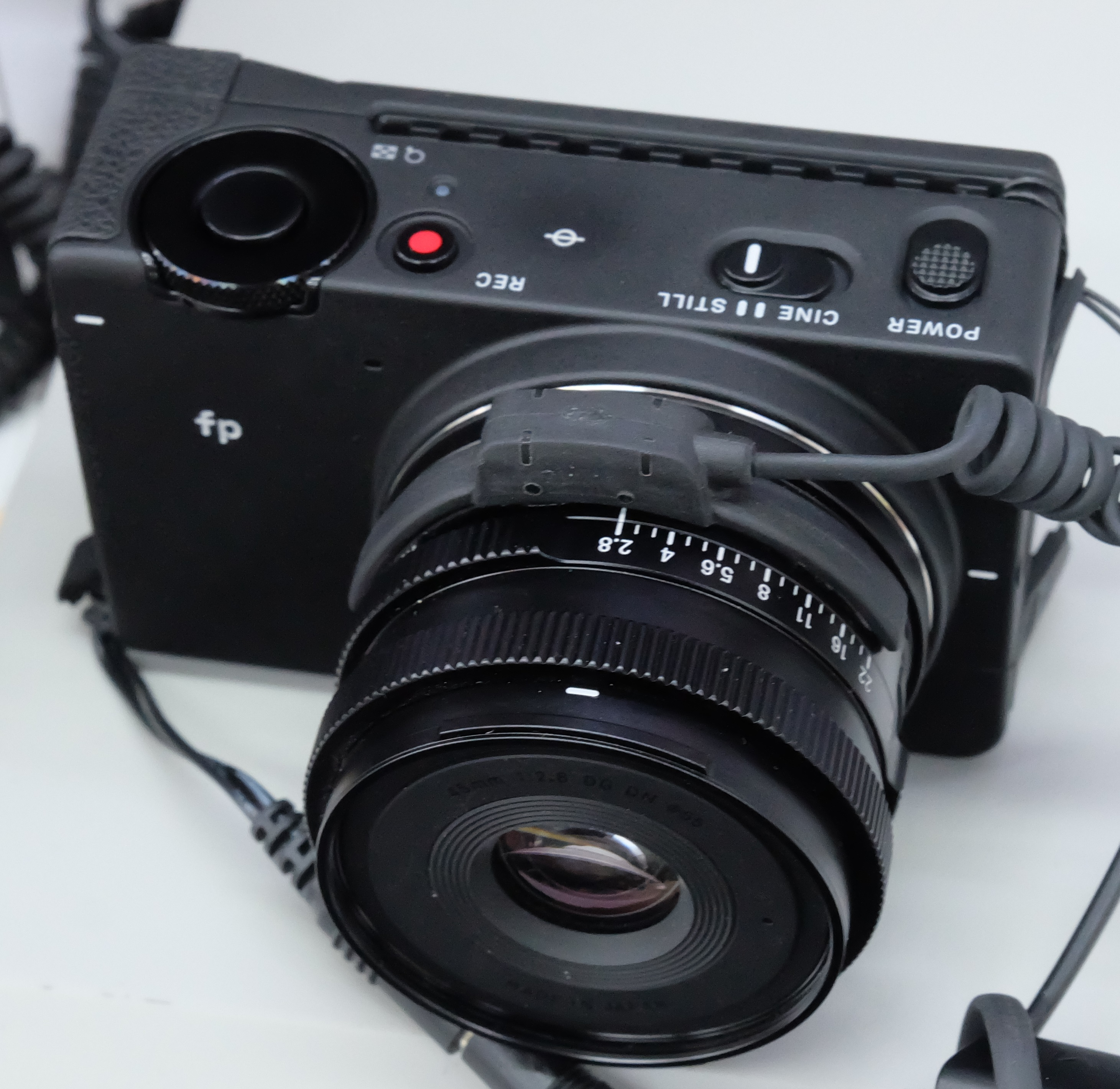

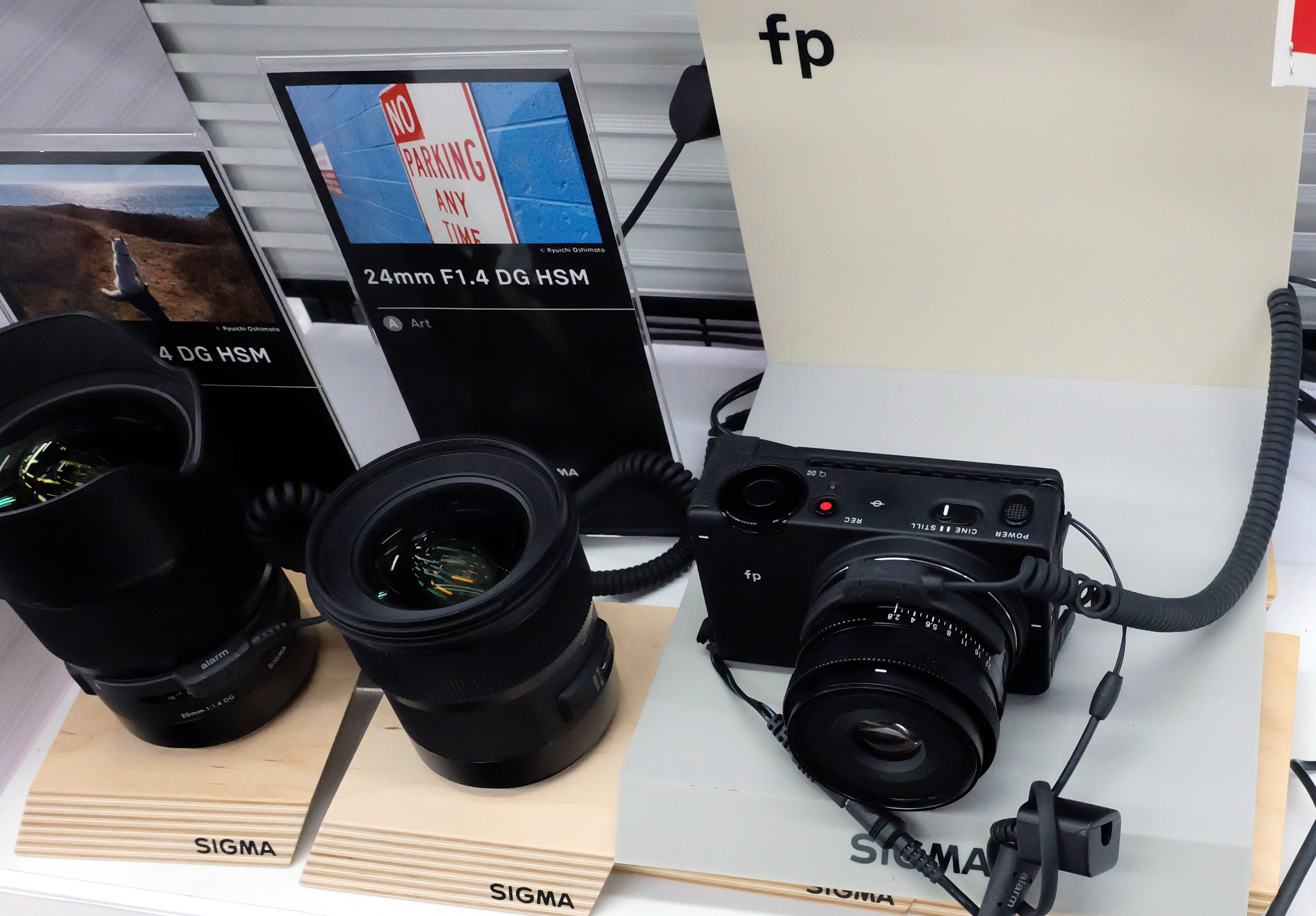

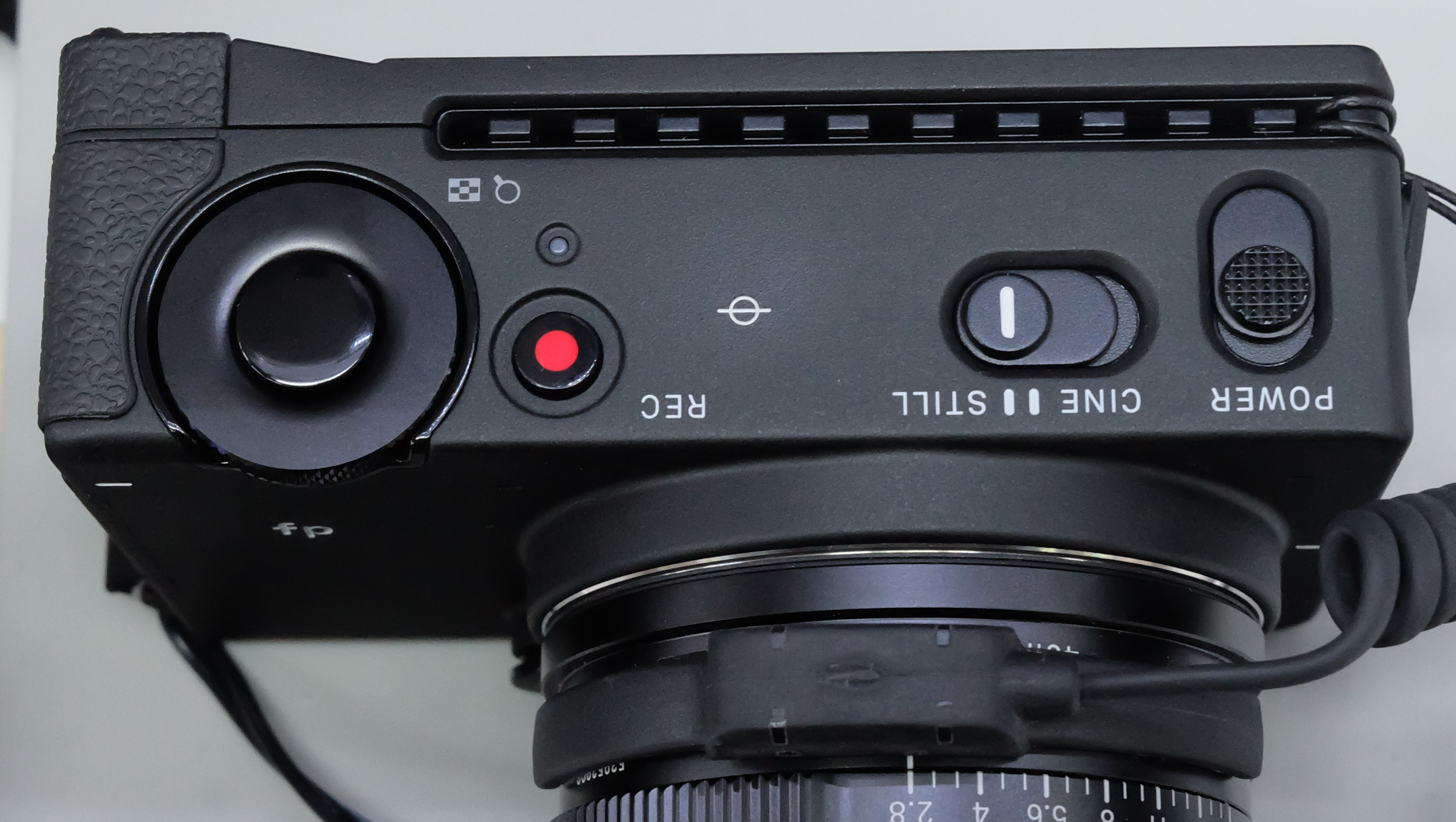

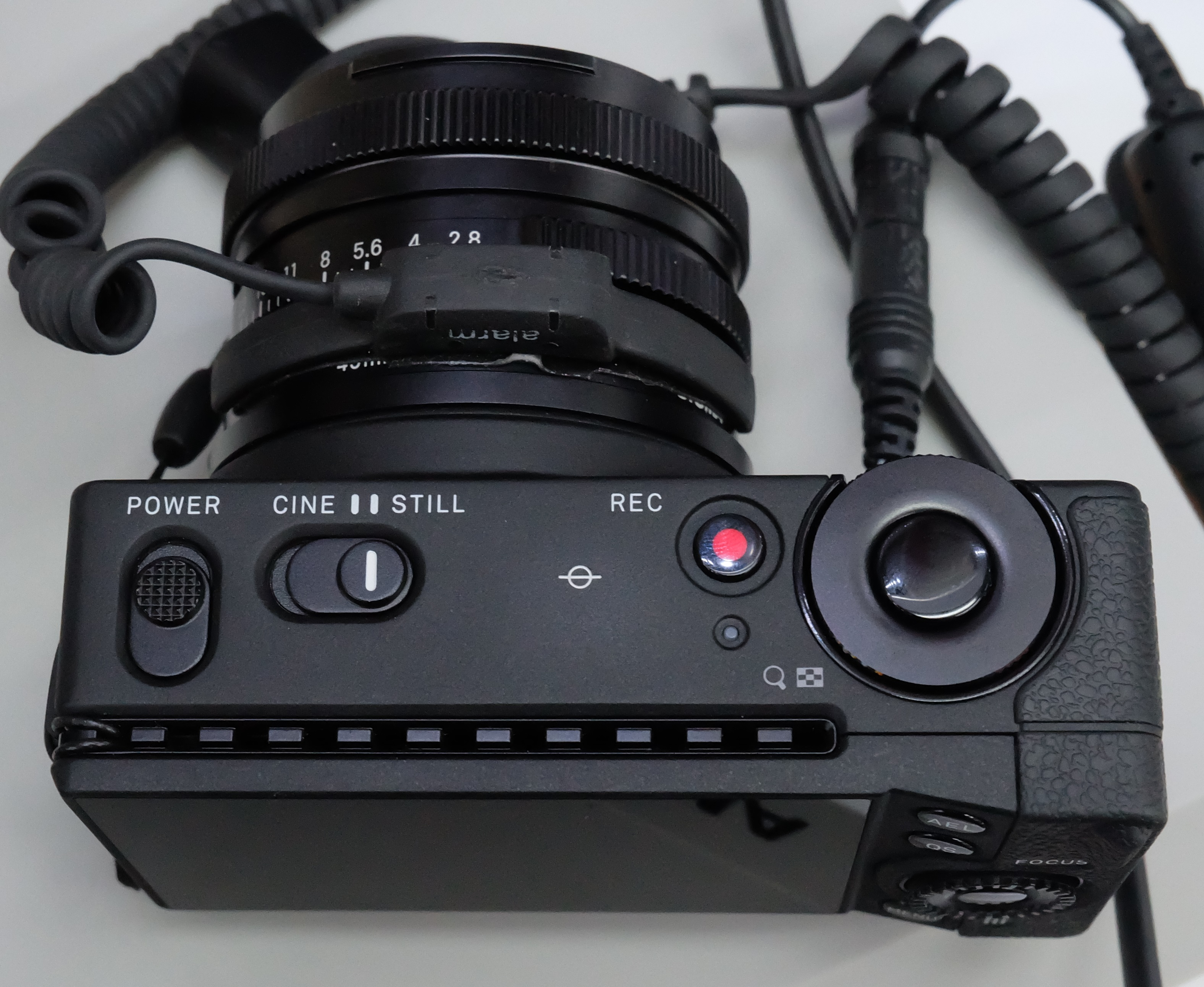

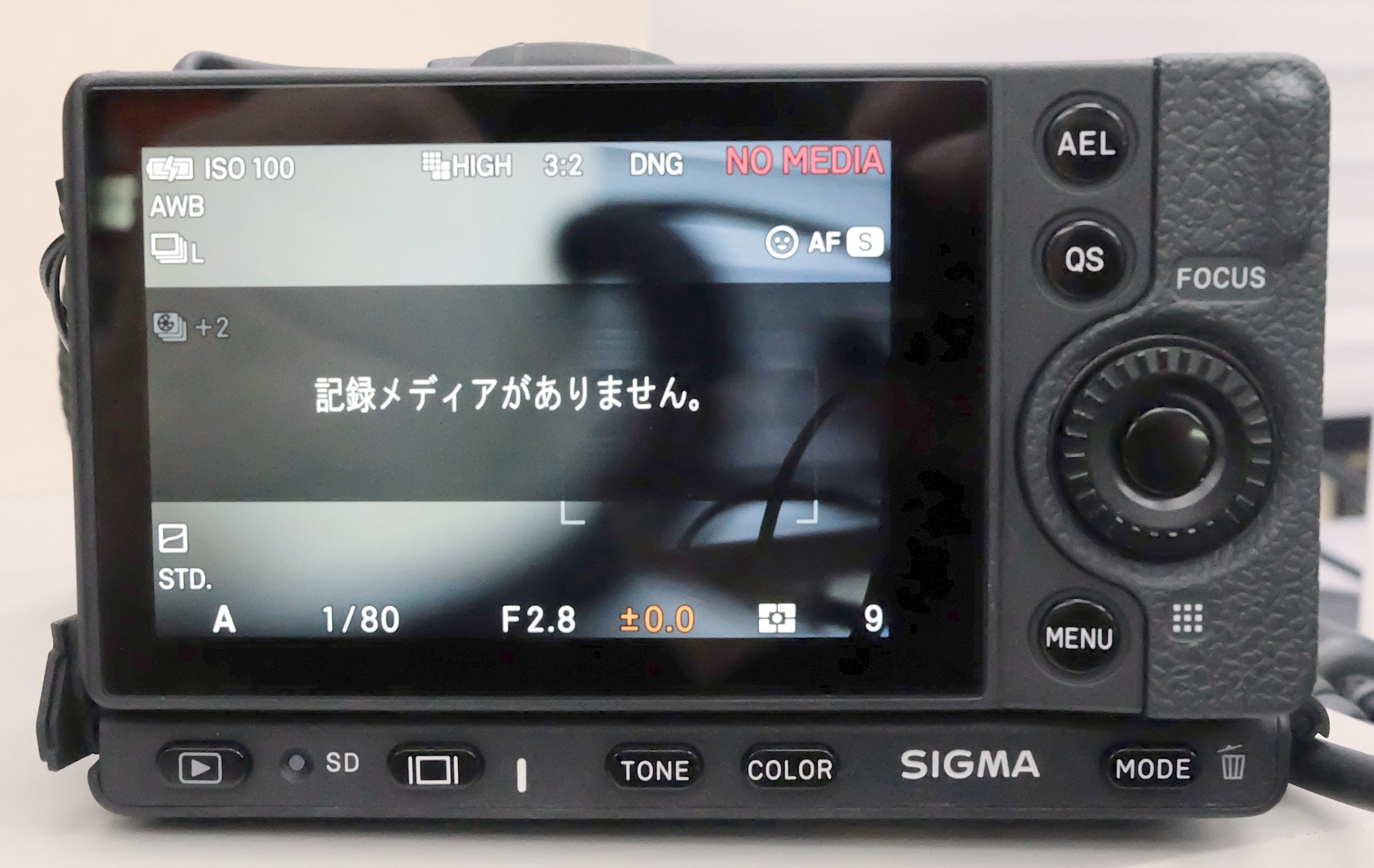

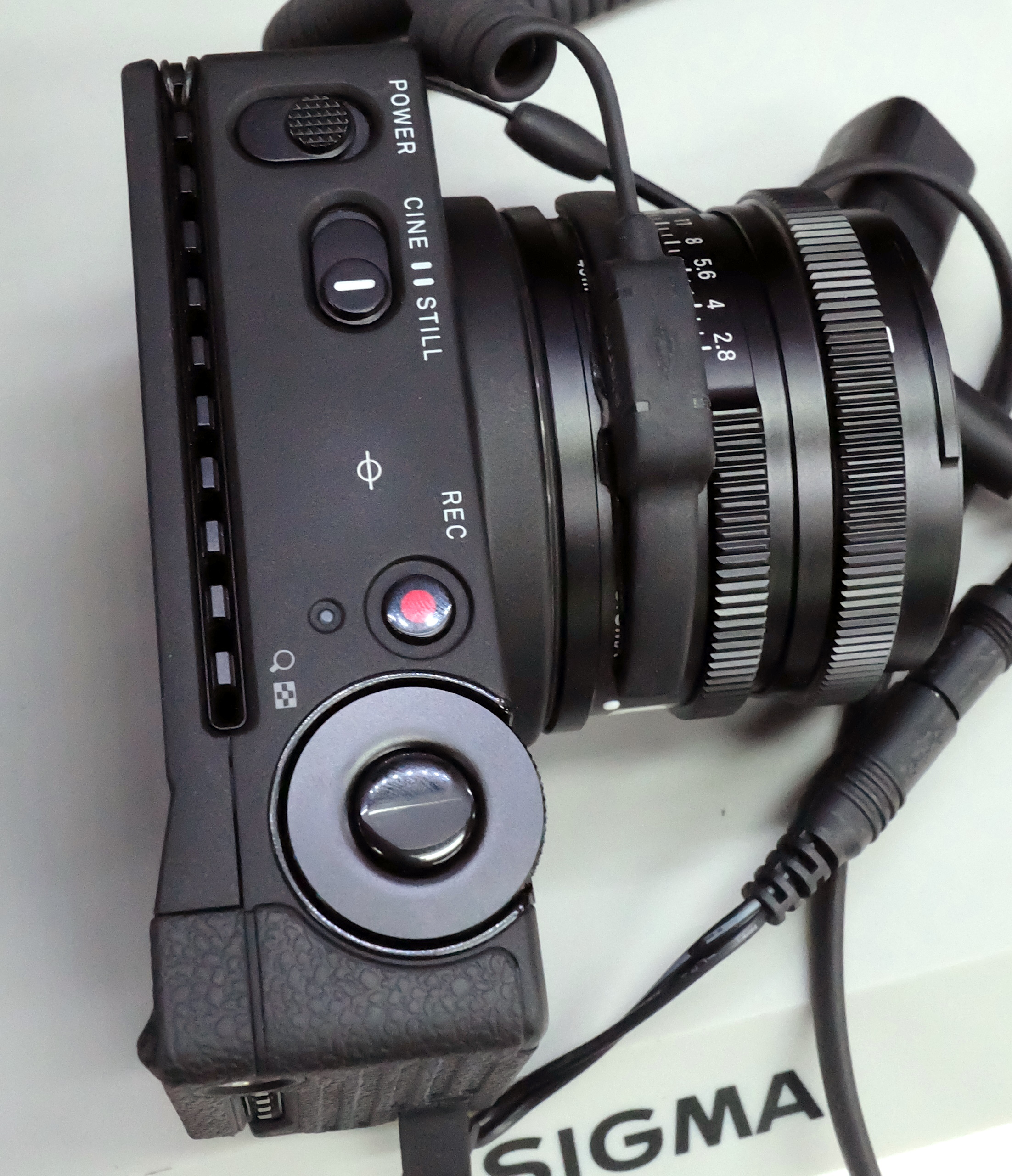

== See also ==
- List of smallest mirrorless cameras

Type	Lens	2002	2003	2004	2005	2006	2007	2008	2009	2010	2011	2012	2013	2014	2015	2016	2017	2018	2019	2020	2021	2022	2023	2024	2025	2026
MILC	Full frame																									
MILC	Full frame																	BF								
MILC	Full frame																	fp L								
MILC	Full frame																	fp							FP2	
MILC	APS-H															SD Quattro H										
MILC	APS-C															SD Quattro										
Compact (Prime lens)	Wide														dp0 Quattro											
Compact (Prime lens)	Wide							DP1		DP1s	DP1x		DP1 Merrill		dp1 Quattro											
Compact (Prime lens)	Normal								DP2	DP2s	DP2x		DP2 Merrill	dp2 Quattro												
Compact (Prime lens)	Tele												DP3 Merrill	dp3 Quattro												
DSLR	APS-C	SD9		SD10				SD14		SD15		SD1	SD1 Merrill													
