= YI Technology =

Chinese consumer electronics company

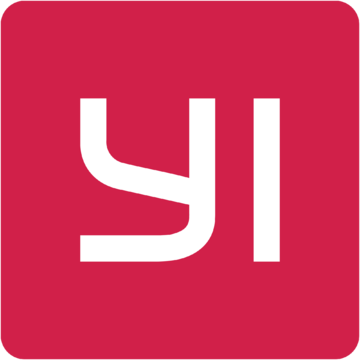
- Trade name: YI Technology inc.
- Native name: 小蚁科技有限公司
- Type: Private
- Industry: Consumer electronics, Computer vision
- Founded: February 1, 2014; 12 years ago
- Founder: Shengwei (Sean) Da
- Headquarters: Pudong District, Shanghai, China
- Website: www.yitechnology.com

YI Technology, also known as Xiaoyi (Chinese: 小蚁) in Mainland China markets, is a company that manufactures cameras and computer vision technologies. Some of the company's popular camera models include the YI 1080p Home Camera, and the YI Outdoor Security Camera. YI Technology was originally backed and branded by Xiaomi, but in October 2016, YI split off from Xiaomi, dropping the "Xiaomi Yi" branding.

Since its founding YI Technology has gone on to produce a wide range of indoor and outdoor security cameras and has shipped products to over 186 countries and created the sub-brand "Kami" in late 2018.

== History ==
YI Technology was founded in 2015 and is headquartered in Shanghai, China.

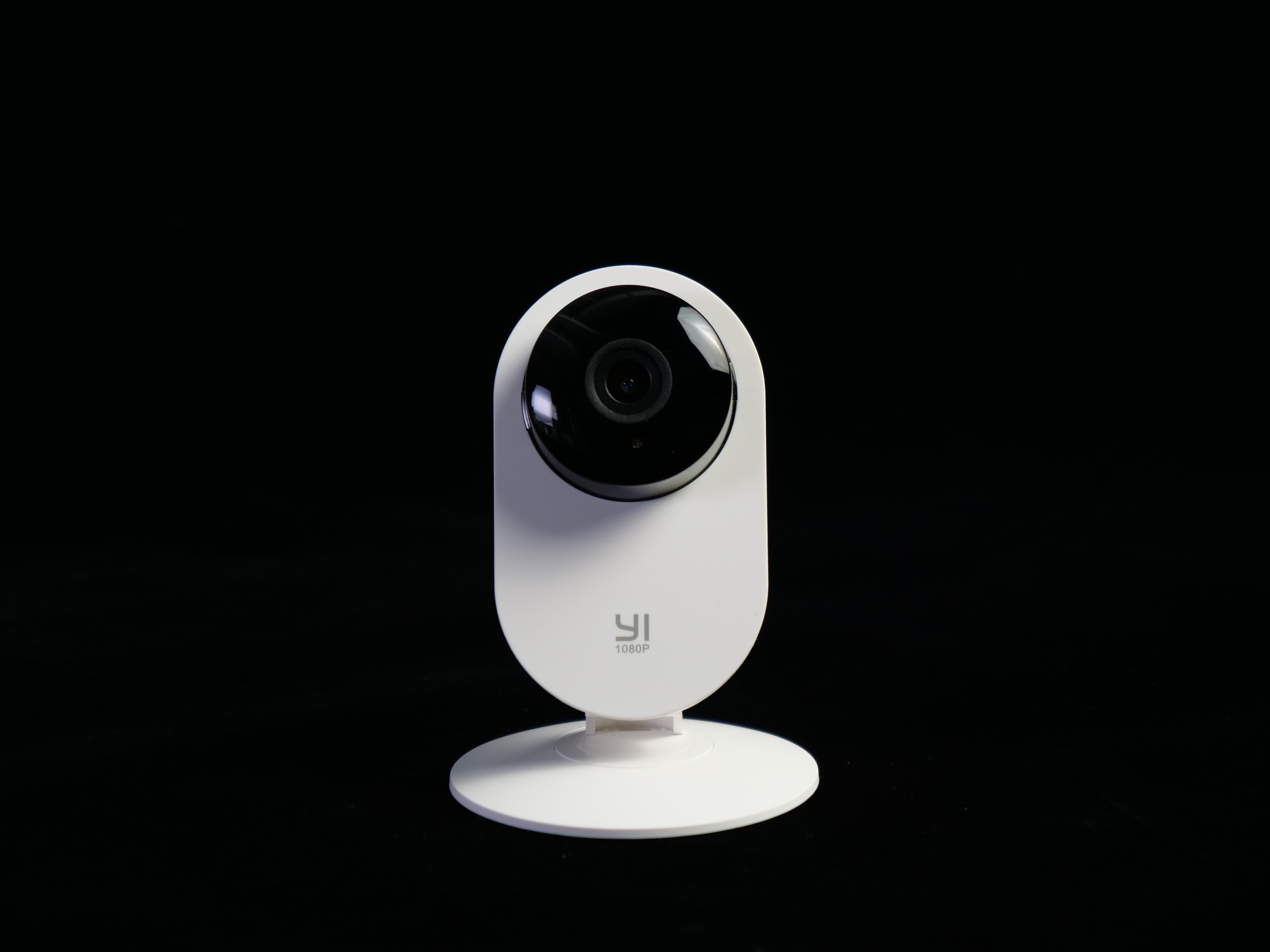
The YI 1080p Home Camera

In 2018, YI Technology partnered with Google to produce the YI Horizon VR180, Google's first VR180 marketplace camera.

On November 7, 2018, YI Technology launched the sub-brand "Kami" and released the Kami Indoor Camera.

== Products ==
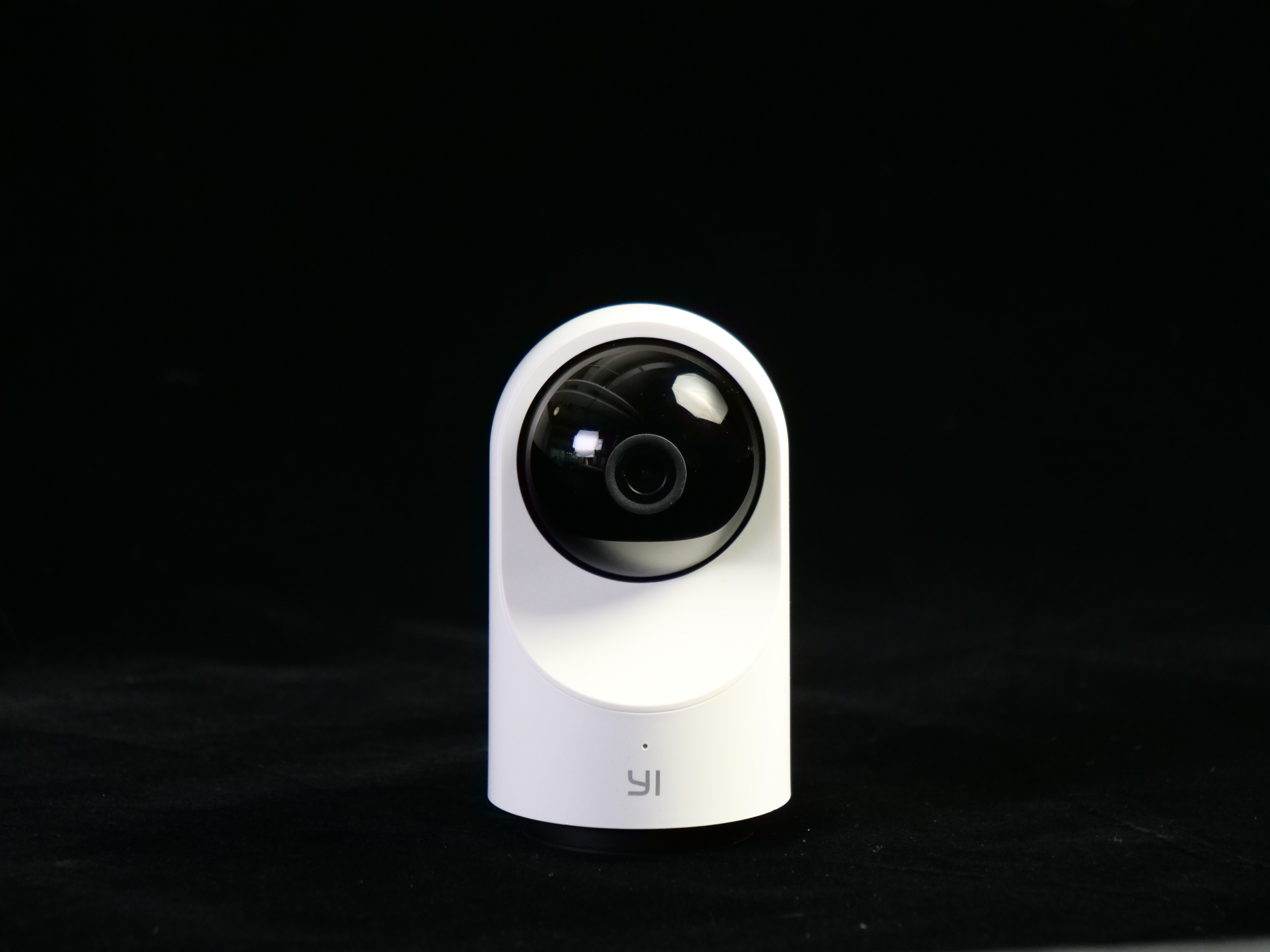
The YI Dome X Camera

Notable products include:

- YI Halo Camera (discontinued)
- YI 360 VR Camera (discontinued)
- YI 1080p Home Camera
- YI Dome X Camera
- YI Outdoor Security camera
- YI Lite Action Camera
- YI 4K Action Camera
- YI M1 Mirrorless Camera (discontinued)
- YI Nightscape Dash Camera
- YI Smart Dash Camera
- YI PTZ 1080p Outdoor camera
- Kami Indoor Camera
- Kami Outdoor Camera

== Recognition ==
YI Technology has received a number of awards in mainland China and abroad. Some awards include the 2017 Red Dot Award for Product design, and the 2018 DISTREE EMEA Smart Tech Diamond Award.

== See also ==
- Home Security
- Edge Computing
- Security Cameras
- Google Nest
- Ring
