= Samsung NX mini =

2014 1.0-type mirrorless camera

Samsung NX Mini
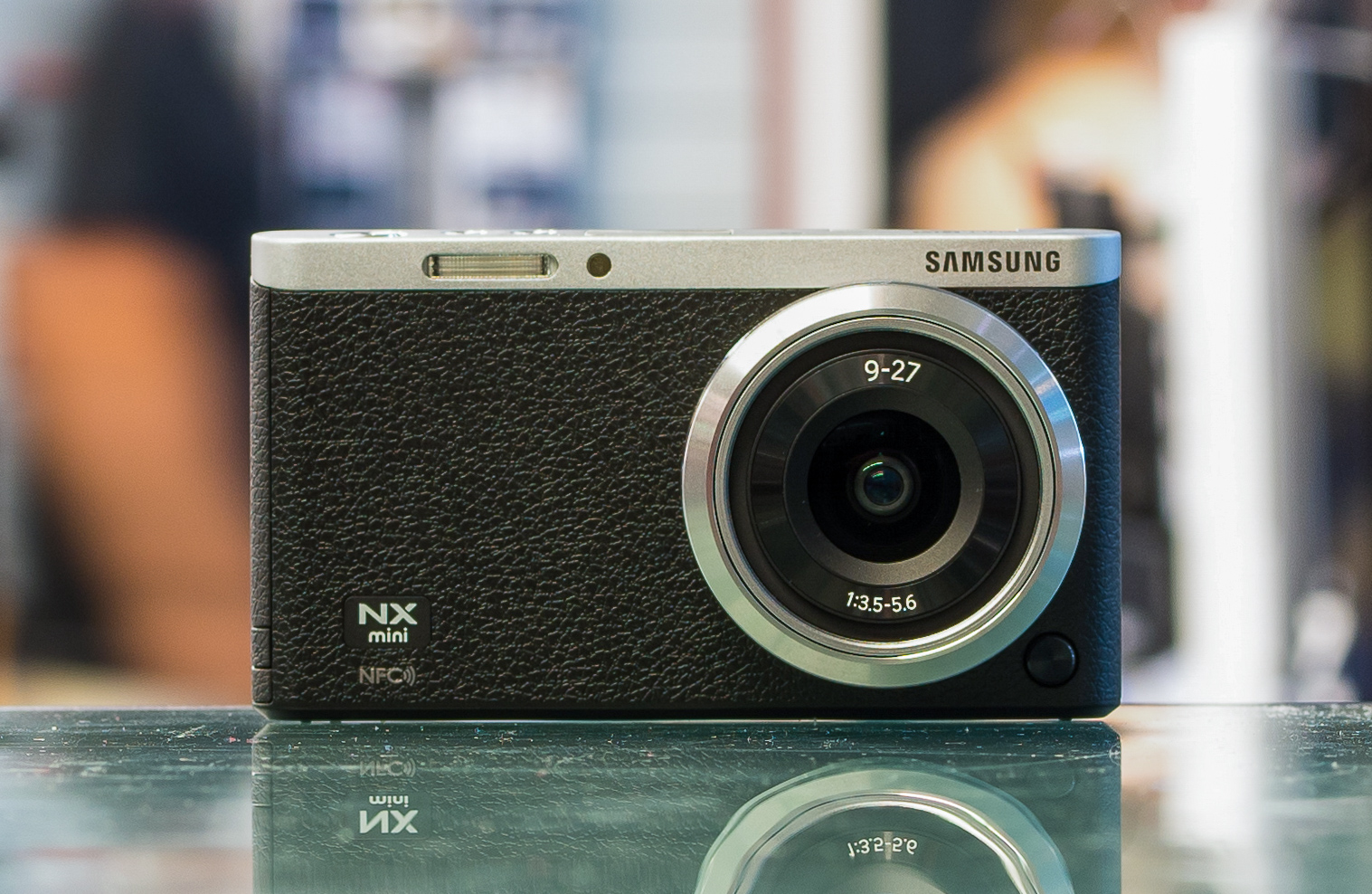
- Samsung NX mini, black color, with Samsung 9-27mm lens

Overview
- Maker: Samsung

Lens
- Lens mount: Samsung NX-M mount

Sensor/medium
- Sensor type: BSI-CMOS
- Sensor size: 13.2 × 8.8mm (1 inch type)
- Maximum resolution: 5472 × 3648 (21 megapixels)
- Film speed: 100-25600
- Recording medium: microSD/microSDHC/microSDXC

Focusing
- Focus: contrast-detect autofocus
- Focus areas: 21 focus points

Exposure/metering
- Exposure modes: Program; Aperture-priority; Shutter-priority; Manual

Shutter
- Shutter speeds: 1/16000s to 30s
- Continuous shooting: 6 frames per second

Image processing
- White balance: Yes

General
- Video recording: H.264, up to 1920 × 1080/30p
- LCD screen: 3 inches with 460,800 dots, capacitive touchscreen
- Battery: 3.8V, 2330 mAh
- AV port: HDMI
- Data port(s): 802.11b/g/n, NFC, USB 2.0
- Dimensions: 110 mm × 62 mm × 23 mm (4.33 in × 2.44 in × 0.91 in) (W × H × D)
- Weight: 158 g (5.6 oz) (196 g (6.9 oz) with battery)

The Samsung NX mini is a digital rangefinder-style interchangeable lens mirrorless camera announced by Samsung on March 19, 2014.

== Design features ==
The NX mini features a self-portrait mode where flipping the rear screen to face forward turns the camera on, and a wink will start a two-second countdown timer to shutter release. Photographs may be shared via flickr and Dropbox when the NX mini is connected using its onboard Wi-Fi, or transmitted to compatible smartphones through NFC.

== NX Mini 2 ==
In June 2015, rumors were circulated of a NX mini 2. Based on leaked specifications, the NX mini 2 would feature high-resolution 4K video recording and interchangeable front covers. It would use the same sensor with an AMOLED rear screen and a battery with slightly less capacity (1820 mAh versus 2330 mAh).

== Lenses ==
The NX mini uses a 1" sensor, giving it a 2.7x crop factor relative to 35mm. It uses the Samsung NX-M lens mount with a register of 6.95 mm, which is among the shortest in existence. An adaptor (ED-MA4NXM) may be separately purchased to mount larger lenses using the Samsung NX-mount, which is designed for an APS-C sensor.

Focal length	35mm EFL	Angle of view	Design				Features		Filter size
Focal length	35mm EFL	Angle of view	Aperture	Construction (Note: Lens construction, consisting of: E: number of elements; G: number of cemented groups; A: number of aspherical elements; ED: number of "extra-low dispersion" elements; XHR: number of "extreme high refractive" elements)	Size (Note: Listed as maximum diameter × length)	Weight	OIS (Note: "Optical Image Stabilizer" (moving-element type))	Pancake (Note: "Pancake" type compact lens)	Filter size
9mm	24.3mm	83.4°	f/3.5–11	6E/5G (1A, 1ED, 1XHR)	50 mm × 12.5 mm (1.97 in × 0.49 in)	31 g (1.1 oz)	No	Yes	none
9–27mm	24.3–72.9mm	83.4–33.1°	f/3.5~5.6–11	9E/8G (1A, 1ED)	50 mm × 29.5 mm (1.97 in × 1.16 in)	73 g (2.6 oz)	Yes	Yes	39mm
17mm	45.9mm	50.5°	f/1.8–11	8E/5G (2A, 1XHR)	50 mm × 27.5 mm (1.97 in × 1.08 in)	55 g (1.9 oz)	Yes	Yes	39mm

== See also ==
- Samsung NX-mount
- Nikon 1 series, a competing interchangeable-lens system with 1"-sensors (branded Nikon CX format)
- List of smallest mirrorless cameras

Level	2010		2011	2012	2013		2014	2015
High-End								NX1
Advanced	NX10		NX11	NX20			NX30	
Mid-range		NX100	NX200	NX210	NX300		NX300M	NX500
Mid-range							Galaxy NX	
Upper-entry						NX2000	NX3000	NX3300
Entry-level	NX5			NX1000	NX1100			
Compact-entry							NX mini	NX mini 2
