= Panasonic Lumix DC-S9 =

Panasonic LUMIX DC-S9
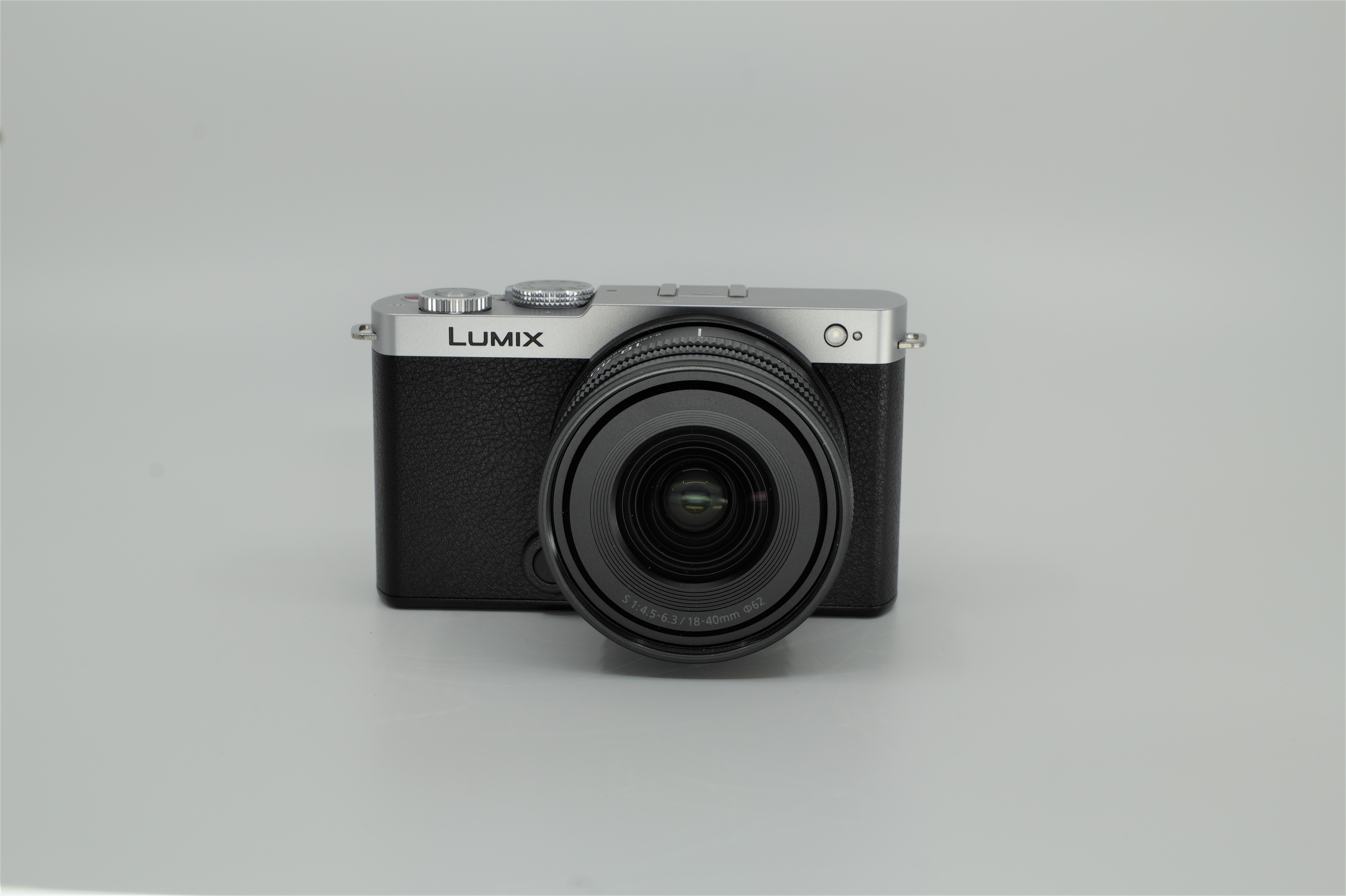
- Panasonic LUMIX S9 full frame mirrorless camera with a lens

Overview
- Maker: Panasonic Corporation
- Type: Mirrorless interchangeable-lens digital camera (full frame)
- Released: 20 June 2024; 2 years ago

Lens
- Lens mount: Leica L-mount
- Lens: L-Mount system
- Compatible lenses: L-Mount lenses

Sensor/medium
- Sensor: Full-frame CMOS sensor
- Sensor type: 24.2 MP BSI CMOS (digital)
- Sensor size: 36 × 24 mm
- Sensor maker: Sony Semiconductor manufacturing Corporation
- Maximum resolution: 6000 x 4000 (~24.2 MP)
- Film speed: 100 – 51200 (standard); 50 - 204800 (expand)
- Recording medium: SD/SDHC/SDXC (UHS-II)

Focusing
- Focus: Hybrid AF (phase-detect + contrast detect)
- Focus modes: AFS (Single), AFC (Continuous), MF, AFF
- Focus areas: Multiple selectable (incl. AI subject detection/tracking)
- Focus bracketing: Yes

Exposure/metering
- Exposure: TTL metering
- Exposure bracketing: Yes
- Exposure modes: Program (P), Aperture Priority (A), Shutter Priority (S), Manual (M), Auto
- Metering modes: Multiple / Center-weighted / Spot

Flash
- Flash: No built-in flash

Shutter
- Frame rate: Up to ~30 fps (electronic shutter, burst mode)
- Shutter: Electronic shutter only
- Shutter speed range: up to approx. 60–1/8000 sec
- Continuous shooting: Up to 30 fps

Image processing
- Image processor: Venus Engine with L2 Technology
- White balance: Presets and custom
- WB bracketing: Yes

General
- Video recording: 6K (3:2 open gate) up to 30p, 10-bit 5.9K / 4K up to 30p–60p (depending on crop mode) 4K 10-bit 4:2:2 internal recording FHD up to high frame rates (slow motion modes up to 180 fps)
- LCD screen: 3.0-inch vari-angle touchscreen, 1.84M-dot resolution
- Battery: DMW-BLK22 Li-ion battery USB-PD rechargeable
- Optional battery packs: External USB-C power support
- Optional accessories: Hand grip (DMW-HGR2-type accessories), cages, L-Mount lenses, straps, USB-C power accessories
- AV port(s): Micro HDMI Type-D, 3.5mm mic, USB-C
- Data port(s): USB-C, Wi-Fi, Bluetooth
- Body features: Magnesium alloy top plate, IBIS, cold shoe
- Dimensions: 126 mm × 74 mm × 47 mm (5.0 in × 2.9 in × 1.9 in)
- Weight: 486 g (17 oz) (1.071 lb) (with battery and SD card)
- Made in: PR China

The Panasonic LUMIX DC-S9 (also known as the LUMIX S9) is a digital, full frame mirrorless interchangeable-lens camera. It was released by Panasonic in June 2024 as part of the LUMIX S series cameras. Designed with input from Gen Z and marketed as a camera for social media, it combined many of the features of the LUMIX S5II with a smaller body that measures 126x74x47mm, and weighs only 486g. It also added a dedicated LUT (Look Up Table) button on the back to allow quick access to color alteration, akin to filters. It was released in a number of different colors.

The S9 uses a 24 MP BSI CMOS sensor and is designed as a hybrid model that includes features for both still photography and video. It has in-body image stabilization (IBIS) and a hybrid phase detection autofocus system with 779 points on the sensor.

== Features ==
=== Video Capabilities ===
The S9 offers a range of video recording options, including 6K recording at up to 30p with 10-bit 4:2:0 color sampling. It supports both 16:9 widescreen and full sensor-height 3:2 open-gate recording, allowing footage to be reframed or cropped into multiple aspect ratios such as vertical or square formats. The camera also includes a 3.8K "MP4 Lite" recording option designed for smaller file sizes meant for smartphones. This combines with the S9's Real Time LUT to cut down on necessary editing and enable faster turnaround from capture to sharing. The IBIS unit provides good stabilization for handheld video capture.

On release, the S9 was limited to 10 minutes of recording in 6K, 15 minutes in DCI 4K/4K UHD and below, and 20 minutes in 1080P, but an October 2024 firmware update included the ability to shoot video without any time limitations. In its open gate video mode, it also added new frame formats and a display of up to three frame markers to enable easier editing at different crops.

The S9 is recommended for anyone looking to upgrade from their phone since you can get the footage instantly on your phone, or anyone with one of the larger versions looking for a smaller camera to take while traveling.

=== Still photography features ===
The S9 supports up to 30fps focus drive with a pre-capture option, phase detect autofocus with subject recognition, and a 96MP handheld multi-shot mode. With live view, the S9 can shoot up to 8fps. JPG and Raw formats are available.

The S9 only has an electronic shutter. While electronic shutters have been known to have rolling shutter issues, the S9 uses the same sensor and processing engine as the S5II which has not had complaints of this. The S9 also doesn't support flash photography, as its cold shoe cannot support an external flash.

New cropping features, Crop Zoom and Hybrid Zoom, allow more reach without the need to switch lenses.

The S9 reportedly provides comparable image quality to other 24MP full-frame cameras, with good detail and noise reduction. Color reproduction is generally accurate, but the camera is notable for its LUT options and easy in-camera editing.

=== Autofocus ===
The S9 shares its autofocus algorithms with the S5II. It uses a 779-point autofocus system with a variety of selectable AF modes, including pinpoint, one-area, one-area plus, zone, horizontal/vertical zone, full-area, and subject tracking. Focus points can be selected via the touchscreen or the four-way controller.

Subject recognition autofocus is available in both stills and video modes, though some reviewers noted that it is common for tracking performance to be less consistent in video. Upon launch, the S9 could track humans, animals, birds, cars, and motorcycles. An October 2024 update enhanced the subject detection to include airplanes, trains, and specific parts of cars and motorcycles.

=== Body ===
Panasonic polled Gen Z users to discover what that generation considers most important in a camera, and based on this feedback, built the S9 to have a compact, lightweight body aimed at portability and social media-oriented use. It measures 126x74x47mm, and weighs only 486g. In exchange for that small chassis, it did eliminate an eye-level viewfinder and a mechanical shutter. It also lacks dual card slots, instead featuring a single SD card slot.

The camera's only display is a three inch vari-angle LCD touchscreen with approximately 1.84 million dots that can flip and rotate. It also has a four-way controller and a dedicated LUT (Look Up Table) button on the back to allow quick access to color alteration, akin to social media filters.

The S9 has an accessory shoe, but it does not have electrical contacts, so it cannot be connected to a flash or a dedicated microphone. It is also missing a headphone jack.

The camera uses the DMW-BLK22 battery CIPA rated for 470 shots per charge, and supports USB-C charging from external power sources.

The S9 was released in 4 colors: Jet Black, Crimson Red, Dark Olive, and Night Blue. More color options have been released since, though they may differ by region.

=== Image sensor ===
The S9 features the same 24 megapixel, full frame BSI CMOS sensor as the LUMIX S5II though Panasonic has suggested that it is not identical. It therefore inherits the photo and video quality options, including the composite high-resolution pixel shift mode and pre-capture bursts from the S5II. However, because the S9 only has an electronic-shutter with a 12-bit readout mode, its dynamic range is slightly reduced. This does not seem to impact video.

The S9 has a built-in 5-axis IBIS unit and is CIPA rated up to 6.5 stops of stability with Dual IS.

=== Lenses ===
The S9 uses the L-Mount system, making it compatible with a wide range of full-frame lenses from Panasonic, Leica, Sigma, and others. At launch, it was introduced alongside a compact 26mm f/8 prime lens that matches its size-focused concept. The lens is extremely small and lightweight, but it is manual-focus only, with no distance markings and a fixed aperture, requiring focus aids such as magnification and focus peaking for precise operation. Image quality is described as acceptable for the price.

Following launch, Panasonic also introduced an 18–40mm f/4.3–6.3 collapsible zoom lens as a kit option for the S9 with a more flexible zoom range while retaining the prioritization of portability.

=== Connectivity and smart features ===
The S9 includes a Micro HDMI port and a USB-C port as well as a 3.5mm microphone jack. The camera does not include a headphone jack. The USB-C supports battery charging but does not support UVC or UAC for use as a USB webcam. The camera has built-in stereo microphones and can be used with external microphones. The S9 can connect to Bluetooth and Wi-Fi, and can be set to automatically pair with a smartphone.

Upon release, the S9 was compatible with the LUMIX Sync app, which was expanded upon in the LUMIX Lab app in an October 2024 update.

=== Assist tools and features ===
The S9 includes a LUT (Look Up Table) system that allows color adjustments, akin to a filter on social media, to be applied in-camera to photos and video. It can store up to 40 LUTs, including a reserved V-Log to 709 LUT, and supports Real-time LUT processing so effects can be applied at the point of capture and apply two LUTs simultaneously. LUTs can be created or downloaded via the Lumix Lab smartphone app and transferred to the camera, including LUTs from Panasonic and selected creators. This should minimize editing needed after capture.

In video mode, the camera also has various display and monitoring tools like waveform, zebras, log view assist, and record frame indicator. It also has support for anamorphic lenses.

=== Similar cameras ===
The LUMIX S9 is often compared to the Fujifilm X100VI due to its size. However, the X100VI uses an APS-C sensor with a permanently attached lens, while the S9 is a full-frame mirrorless camera that works with the full-range of L-Mount lenses, among other differences.

The S9 has also been compared in size to the Sony ZV-E10, but is less expensive, has a different kind of sensor, and provides higher resolution photos and video.

The S9 shares many features with other Panasonic mirrorless cameras. It has the same 15.8Wh DMW-BLK22 battery as the LUMIX S5II, S1RII, S1II and S1IIE.

== Reception ==
Reviews of the Panasonic LUMIX S9 were mixed with some reviewers pointing out that the simplicity of the camera made it a useful tool for content creators but less customizable for professional photographers and videographers. A reviewer for Digital Camera World argued that the LUMIX S9 has had bad marketing. Many users compared it to the Fujifilm X100VI due to its size, however the cameras' features differ significantly. He highlighted the versatility of compatibility with L-Mount lenses and the Realtime LUTs to show how the S9 isn't just a small camera, but a useful tool for serious content creators looking to make quality content and minimize necessary editing time.

Other positive feedback included appreciation for the S9's stability, and open gate allowing flexibility in shooting for YouTube and social media simultaneously. Many other reviews also highlighted the Real Time LUT and the way it cuts down on editing and allows for a quick turnaround time between capture and posting.

Criticism included the lack of a front grip and viewfinder, as well as concerns about overheating and battery life while using Wifi. Reviewers also noted limitations in handling for still photography, including slower focus point selection and reduced performance with moving subjects. Some reported banding in still images. Some reviewers pointed out rolling shutter issues, but others did not find this to be a problem.
