= Panasonic Lumix DC-GX850/GX800 =

Overview
- Maker: Panasonic
- Type: Micro Four Thirds system mirrorless camera
- Released: February 2017

Lens
- Lens mount: Micro Four Thirds system mount

Sensor/medium
- Sensor type: CMOS
- Sensor size: 17.3 × 13mm (Four Thirds type)
- Maximum resolution: 4592 × 3448 (16 megapixels)
- Recording medium: SD, SDHC, or SDXC card

Focusing
- Focus modes: AF-C (Continuous-Servo), AF-F (Flexible AF), AF-S (Single Servo AF), Manual Focus
- Focus areas: 49 focus points

Exposure/metering
- Exposure modes: Program AE; Aperture Priority, Shutter priority, Manual

Shutter
- Shutter speeds: 1/16000s to 60s
- Continuous shooting: 5.8 frames per second with mechanical shutter. 10 fps with electronic shutter.

Image processing
- Image processor: Venus Engine
- White balance: Yes

General
- Video recording: AVCHD / MP4 / MOV; 3840 x 2160 (24p, 25p, 30p): 100 Mbps; 1920 x 1080p (25p, 30p, 50p, 60p):20 Mbps - 28 Mbps; 1280 x 720p (25p, 30p):10 Mbps
- LCD screen: 3 inch diagonal with 1,040,000 dots
- Dimensions: 106.5 × 64.6 × 33.3mm (4.2 × 2.55 × 1.32 inches)
- Weight: 269 g (9 oz) including battery

The Panasonic Lumix DC-GX850/GX800 (also known as the GF9 in some regions) is an interchangeable lens mirrorless system digital camera announced by Panasonic on January 4, 2017.

It uses the same 16MP Four Thirds sensor as several of its siblings. It is sold with a 12-32mm collapsible f/3.5-5.6 ASPH. MEGA O.I.S. kits lens and includes a 180-degree 3-inch flip-up touch LCD with a 1,040k-dot resolution, Panasonic's Depth-from-Defocus AF, built-in WiFi, and 4K 3840 x 2160 video capture.

The camera also offers Face Detection Focusing, a max ISO of 25600 and Timelapse Recording. However, it doesn't include in-body image stabilization, an external flash shoe, or a built-in viewfinder.

In some markets, a follow-up model named the GX880, GF10, or GF90 was released, with only external changes to the grip and no internal updates.

Brand	Form	Class	2008	2009	2010	2011			2012	2013	2014	2015	2016	2017	2018	2019	2020	2021	2022	2023	2024	2025	2026
Olympus	SLR style OM-D	Professional															E-M1X ^{R}						
Olympus	SLR style OM-D	High-end									E-M1			E-M1 II ^{R}			E-M1 III ^{R}						
Olympus	SLR style OM-D	Advanced							E-M5			E-M5 II ^{R}					E-M5 III ^{R}						
Olympus	SLR style OM-D	Mid-range									E-M10		E-M10 II		E-M10 III			E-M10 IV					
Olympus	Rangefinder style PEN	Mid-range		E-P1	E-P2		E-P3				E-P5		PEN-F ^{R}										
Olympus	Rangefinder style PEN	Upper-entry			E-PL1	E-PL2		E-PL3	E-PL5		E-PL6	E-PL7		E-PL8	E-PL9		E-PL10						
Olympus	Rangefinder style PEN	Entry-level					E-PM1		E-PM2														
Olympus	remote													Air									
OM System	SLR style	Professional																	OM-1 ^{R}		OM-1 II ^{R}		
OM System	SLR style	High-end																				OM-3 ^{R}	
OM System	SLR style	Advanced																		OM-5 ^{R}			OM-5 II ^{R}
OM System	PEN	Mid-range																	E-P7				
Panasonic	SLR style	High-end Video													GH5S				GH6 ^{R}			GH7 ^{R}	
Panasonic	SLR style	High-end Photo													G9 ^{R}						G9 II ^{R}		
Panasonic	SLR style	High-end		GH1		GH2			GH3		GH4				GH5				GH5II				
Panasonic	SLR style	Mid-range		G1	G2		G3		G5		G6		G7	G80/G85			G90/G95						
Panasonic	SLR style	Entry-level			G10													G100			G100D		
Panasonic	Rangefinder style	Advanced							GX1		GX7		GX8		GX9								
Panasonic	Rangefinder style	Mid-range									GM1	GM5	GX80/GX85										
Panasonic	Rangefinder style	Entry-level			GF1	GF2	GF3		GF5		GF6	GF7	GF8	GX800/GX850/GF9		GX880/GF10/GF90							
Panasonic	Camcorder	Professional							AG-AF104														
Kodak	Rangefinder style	Entry-level										S-1											
DJI	Drone	.												Zenmuse X5S									
DJI	Drone	.												Zenmuse X5									
YI	Rangefinder style	Entry-level												M1									
Yongnuo	Rangefinder style	Android camera															YN450M		YN455				
Blackmagic Design	Rangefinder style	High-End Video							Cinema Camera														
Blackmagic Design	Rangefinder style	High-End Video									Pocket Cinema Camera					Pocket Cinema Camera 4K							
Blackmagic Design		High-End Video										Micro Cinema Camera									Micro Studio Camera 4K G2		
Z CAM	Cinema	Advanced											E1			E2							
Z CAM	Cinema	Mid-Range																E2-M4					
Z CAM	Cinema	Entry-Level															E2C						
JVC	Camcorder	Professional										GY-LS300											
SVS-Vistek		Industrial							EVO Tracer														
