= Samsung NX2000 =

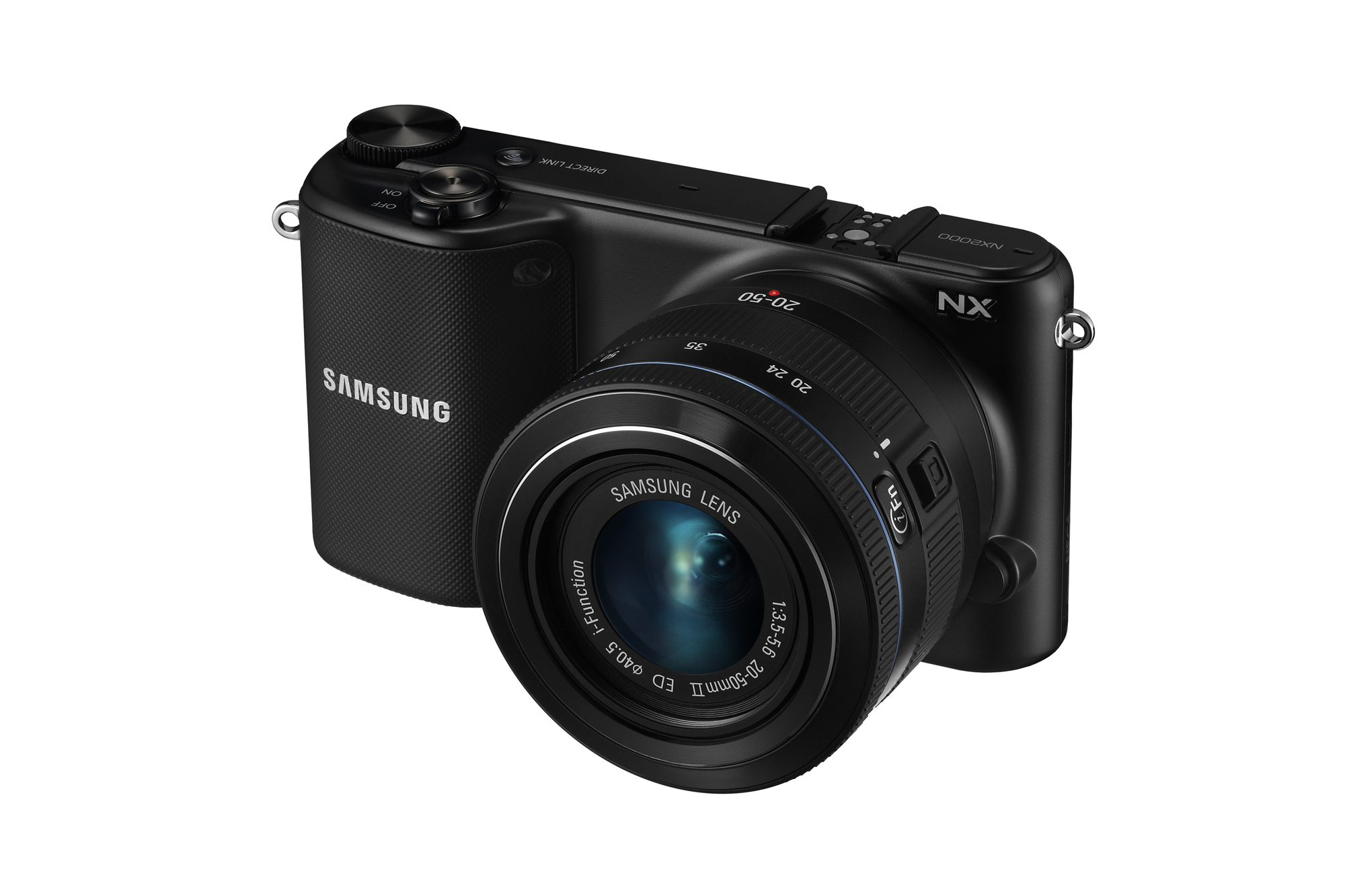

Overview
- Maker: Samsung

Lens
- Lens mount: NX mount

Sensor/medium
- Sensor type: CMOS
- Sensor size: 23.5 x 15.7mm (APS-C type)
- Maximum resolution: 5472 x 3648 (20 megapixels)
- Film speed: 100-25600
- Recording medium: MicroSD, microSDHC or microSDXC memory card

Shutter
- Continuous shooting: 8 frames per second

Image processing
- White balance: Yes

General
- LCD screen: 3.7 inches with 1,152,000 dots (touch screen)
- Dimensions: 119 x 65 x 36mm (4.69 x 2.56 x 1.42 inches)
- Weight: 228 g (8 oz) including battery

The Samsung NX2000 is a rangefinder-styled mirrorless interchangeable lens camera announced by Samsung on May 1, 2013. It has a 20 megapixel sensor, WiFi, and a touch screen, and uses the iFunction menu system.

Level	2010		2011	2012	2013		2014	2015
High-End								NX1
Advanced	NX10		NX11	NX20			NX30	
Mid-range		NX100	NX200	NX210	NX300		NX300M	NX500
Mid-range							Galaxy NX	
Upper-entry						NX2000	NX3000	NX3300
Entry-level	NX5			NX1000	NX1100			
Compact-entry							NX mini	NX mini 2
