= Sigma BF =

Digital mirrorless camera

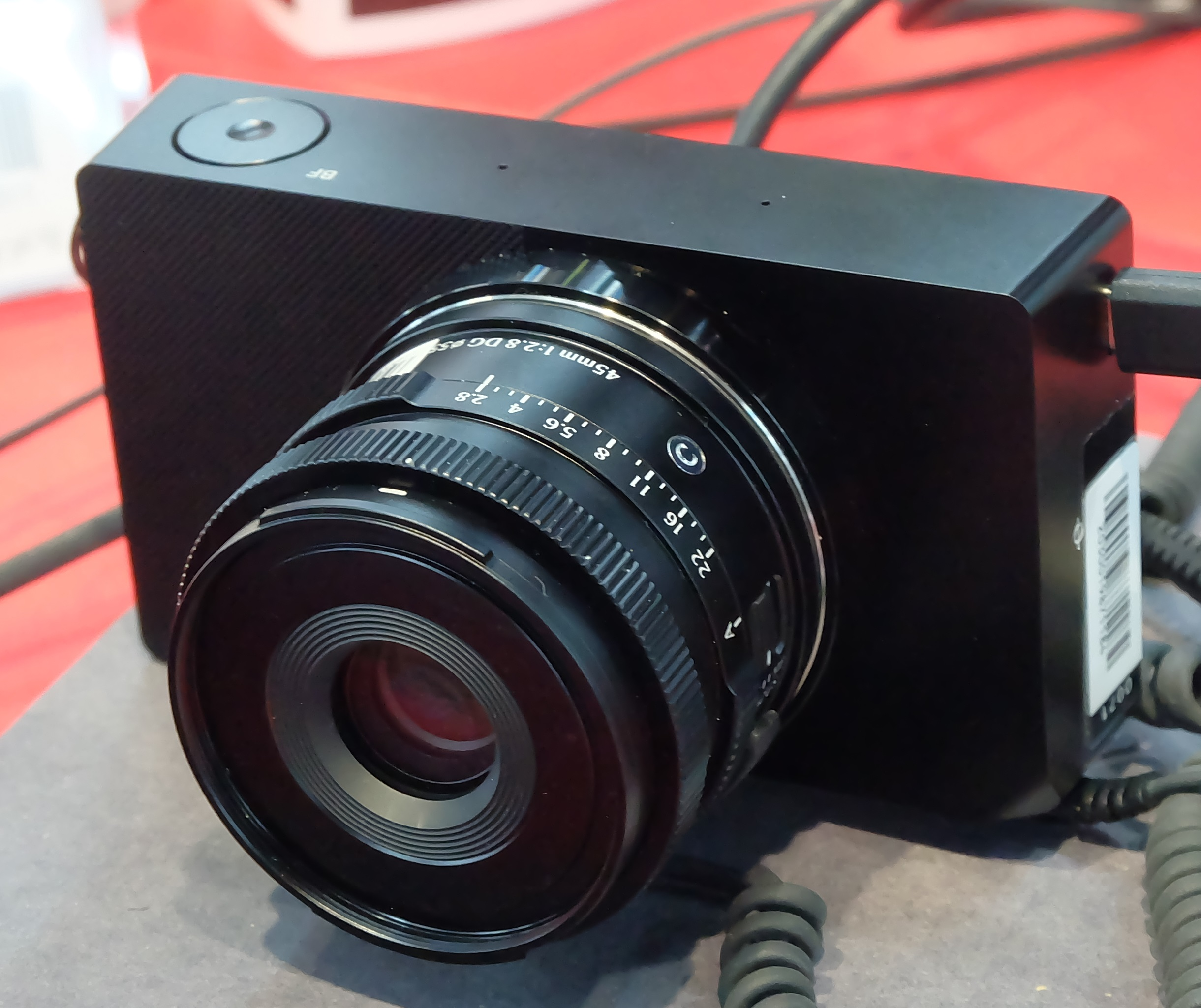
- Sigma BF in black, with the Sigma 45 mm F2.8 DG DN Contemporary lens

Overview
- Maker: Sigma Corporation
- Type: Full-frame mirrorless interchangeable-lens camera
- Released: 24 April 2025; 18 months ago
- Intro price: US$1,999 (body only, at launch)

Lens
- Lens mount: Leica L-Mount
- Lens: Interchangeable

Sensor/medium
- Sensor type: Back-illuminated CMOS
- Sensor size: 35.9 mm × 23.9 mm (full-frame)
- Sensor maker: Sony Semiconductor Manufacturing Corporation
- Maximum resolution: 6016 × 4012 (24.6 effective megapixels)
- Film speed: ISO 100–102400 (expanded ISO 6, 12, 25, 50)
- Recording medium: Approx. 230 GB internal memory; USB storage for backup

Focusing
- Focus: Hybrid phase-detection and contrast-detection autofocus
- Focus modes: Single AF, continuous AF, manual focus
- Focus areas: 1-point AF, area AF, subject tracking (human, animal)

Exposure/metering
- Exposure modes: Program AE, shutter priority, aperture priority, manual
- Exposure metering: Evaluative, spot

Shutter
- Shutter: Electronic
- Shutter speed range: 30 s – 1/25600 s, bulb up to 5 minutes
- Continuous shooting: 3, 5 or 8 fps

Viewfinder
- Viewfinder: None

General
- Video recording: 6K (6016 × 3384) up to 29.97 fps, UHD 4K up to 29.97 fps, FHD up to 119.88 fps; H.264, H.265, L-Log
- LCD screen: 3.15-inch touchscreen TFT LCD, approx. 2.1 million dots
- Battery: BP-81 lithium-ion USB-PD rechargeable
- Data port: USB-C (USB 3.2, 10 Gbit/s)
- Body features: Machined aluminium unibody; dust- and splash-resistant
- Dimensions: 130.1 mm × 72.8 mm × 36.8 mm (5.12 in × 2.87 in × 1.45 in)
- Weight: 388 g (13.7 oz) (body only); 446 g (15.7 oz) (with battery)
- Made in: Japan

Chronology
- Predecessor: Sigma fp

The Sigma BF is a 24.6-megapixel full-frame mirrorless interchangeable-lens camera made by Sigma Corporation. It was announced on 24 February 2025 and released in April 2025 with a suggested retail price of US$1,999 for the body only. It uses the L-mount and is sold in black and silver finishes.

== Design ==
The camera body is machined from a single block of aluminium, a process Sigma states takes about seven hours per body.

== See also ==
- Sigma fp
- Leica L-Mount

Type	Lens	2002	2003	2004	2005	2006	2007	2008	2009	2010	2011	2012	2013	2014	2015	2016	2017	2018	2019	2020	2021	2022	2023	2024	2025
MILC	Full frame																								
MILC	Full frame																	BF							
MILC	Full frame																	fp L							
MILC	Full frame																	fp							
MILC	APS-H															SD Quattro H									
MILC	APS-C															SD Quattro									
Compact (Prime lens)	Wide														dp0 Quattro										
Compact (Prime lens)	Wide							DP1		DP1s	DP1x		DP1 Merrill		dp1 Quattro										
Compact (Prime lens)	Normal								DP2	DP2s	DP2x		DP2 Merrill	dp2 Quattro											
Compact (Prime lens)	Tele												DP3 Merrill	dp3 Quattro											
DSLR	APS-C	SD9		SD10				SD14		SD15		SD1	SD1 Merrill												
