= Articulating screen =

Small repositionable electronic screen

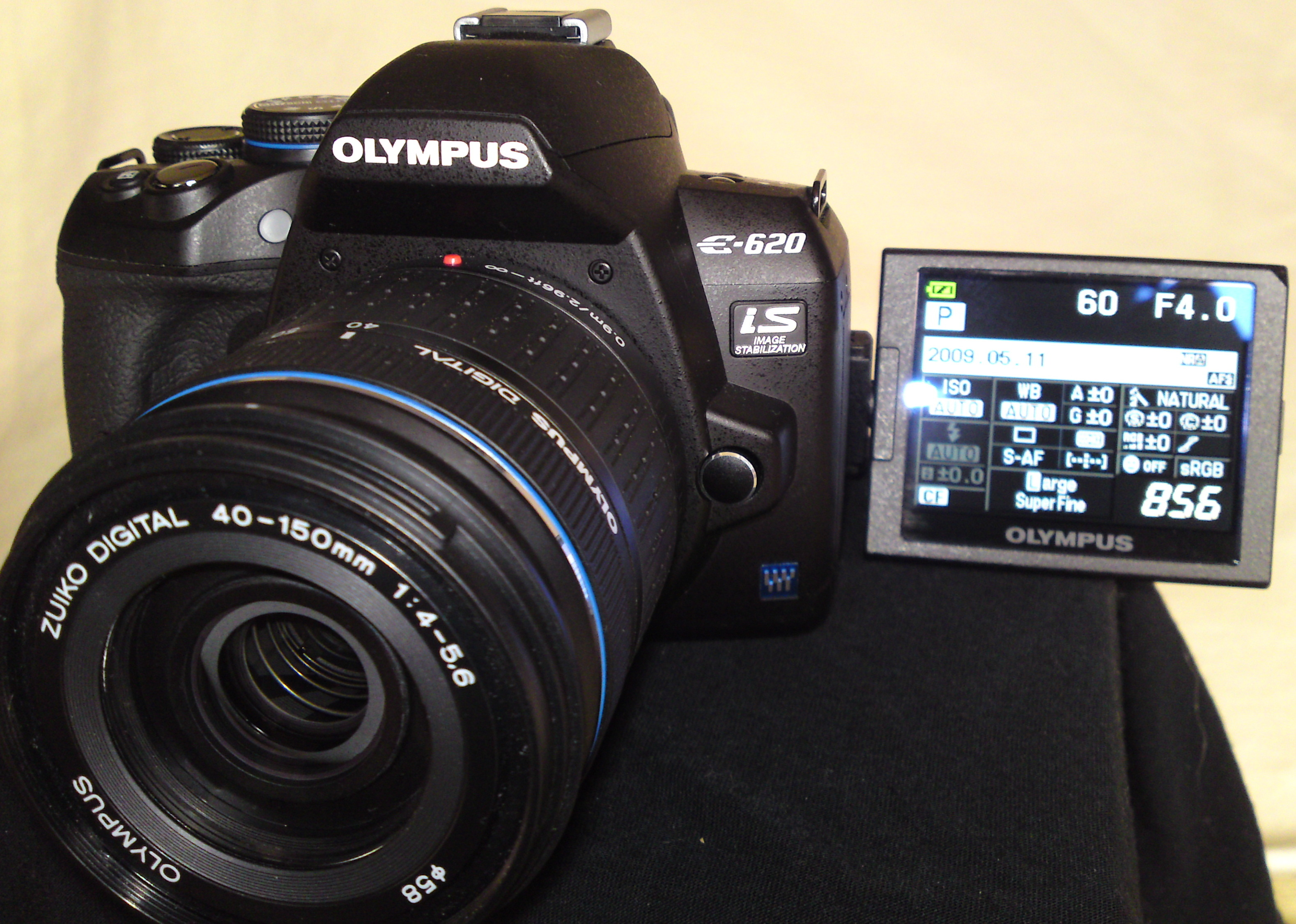
An articulating screen in the Olympus E-620.

An articulating screen is a built-in small electronic visual display which is not fixed, but rather can be repositioned using a hinge or pivot. The articulating screen is known under different other names such as flip-out screen, flip screen, adjustable screen, articulated screen, or hinged screen. According to the way it moves, there are five main types:

1. The display moves around one axis, so that it only tilts. It is called tilting screen or tiltable screen.
2. The display tilts horizontally both up and down and also vertically. This type is called double-hinged tilting screen, two-axis tilting screen, three-direction tilting screen or screen with 3-way tilt.
3. The display moves around two axes which are at a right angle to each other, so that the screen both tilts and swivels. This type is called swivel screen. Other names for this type are vari-angle screen, fully articulated screen, fully articulating screen, rotating screen, multi-angle screen, variable angle screen, flip-out-and-twist screen, twist-and-tilt screen and swing-and-tilt screen.
4. The display is mounted on a fully-articulating hinge that itself is attached to a tilting plate. Such display can be extended out from the back of the camera, ensuring it stays clear of the camera's left-mounted ports when flipping it out to the side. This type of articulating screen is called tilt-and-articulating screen.
5. The display moves into a variety of angles; it tilts horizontally and vertically and also rotates to a certain extent while staying aligned with the lens axis. It still can not be turned all the way up, down or to the side to be seen from the front of the camera for self-portraits. This type of articulating screen is called cross-tilt screen, flexible-tilt screen or flex-tilt screen.

Articulating screens are used in a variety of electronic devices such as laptops, camcorders, digital cameras, desk phones, mobile phones, DVD players and others; also TV screens and computer monitors can be articulating screens.

This article focuses on digital photography, where an articulating screen allows convenient or unobtrusive shooting from various perspectives.

== Digital cameras with a tilting screen ==
The tilting screens of camera models marked with an asterisk (*) here below can be tilted by 180 degrees or close to it so that they may be used to take self portraits more easily.

=== Canon ===
- PowerShot N (2013)
- PowerShot N Facebook ready (2013)
- PowerShot N100 (2014)
- PowerShot G1X Mark II(*) (2014)
- PowerShot G7X(*) (2014)
- PowerShot N2(*) (2015)
- EOS M3(*) (2015)
- XC10 (2015)
- PowerShot G3X(*) (2015)
- EOS M10(*) (2015)
- PowerShot G7 X Mark II(*) (2016)
- EOS M5(*) (2016)
- EOS M6(*) (2017)
- PowerShot SX730 HS(*) (2017)
- EOS M100(*) (2017)
- PowerShot SX740 HS(*) (2018)
- PowerShot G7 X Mark III(*) (2019)
- PowerShot G5 X Mark II(*) (2019)
- EOS M6 Mark II(*) (2019)
- EOS M200(*) (2019)
- PowerShot V10 (2023)

=== Casio ===
- Exilim EX-ZR1000(*) (2012)
- Exilim EX-ZR1100/Exilim EX-ZR1200(*) (2013)
- Exilim EX-10(*) (2013)
- Exilim EX-100(*) (2014)
- Exilim EX-ZR1300/Exilim EX-ZR1500(*) (2014)
- Exilim EX-ZR50(*) (2014)
- Exilim EX-FC500S(*) (2014)
- Exilim EX-ZR1600 / Exilim EX-ZR2000(*) (2015)
- Exilim EX-ZR3000 / Exilim EX-ZR3500(*) (2015)
- Exilim EX-ZR60(*) (2015)

=== Fujifilm ===
- FinePix S9000 Zoom/FinePix S9500 (2005)
- FinePix S9100/FinePix S9600 (2006)
- FinePix S100fs (2008)
- FinePix HS10/FinePix HS11 (2010)
- FinePix HS20 EXR/FinePix HS22 EXR (2011)
- X-S1 (2011)
- FinePix HS30 EXR (2012)
- FinePix SL1000 (2013)
- FinePix HS35 EXR (2013)
- X-M1 (2013)
- X-A1 (2013)
- X-T1 (2014)
- X30 (2014)
- X-A2(*) (2015)
- X-T10 (2015)
- X-T1 IR (2015)
- X70(*) (2016)
- X-A3(*) (2016)
- X-A10(*) (2016)
- X-T20(*) (2017)
- X-A5(*) (2018)
- X-H1 (2018)
- GFX 50R (2018)
- X-T30 (2019)
- X-Pro3 (2019)
- X100V (2020)
- X-E4(*) (2021)
- X-T30 II (2021)
- X100VI (2024)
- X-T50 (2024)
- GFX 100RF (2025)
- X-E5 (2025)
- X-T30 III (2025)

=== Hasselblad ===
- X2D 100C (2022)
- X2D II 100C (2025)

=== JVC ===
- GC-PX10(*) (2011)

=== Kodak ===
- Pixpro S-1 (2014)

=== Konica Minolta ===
- DiMAGE A2 (2004)

=== Leica ===
- Q3 (2023)
- SL3 (2024)
- Q3 43 (2024)
- SL3-S (2025)
- Q3 Monochrom (2025)

=== Lytro ===
- Illum (2014)

=== Medion ===
- Life P44034 (MD 86934)(*) (2014)

=== Minolta ===
- DiMAGE A1 (2003)

=== Nikon ===
- Coolpix P90 (2009)
- Coolpix P100 (2010)
- Coolpix P500 (2011)
- Coolpix P7100 (2011)
- Coolpix P510 (2012)
- Coolpix L830 (2014)
- 1 V3 (2014)
- D750 (2014)
- Coolpix L840 (2015)
- 1 J5(*) (2015)
- D500 (2016)
- Coolpix A900(*) (2016)
- Coolpix B500 (2016)
- D7500 (2017)
- D850 (2017)
- Z6 (2018)
- Z7 (2018)
- A1000(*) (2019)
- Z50(*) (2019)
- D780 (2020)
- Z5 (2020)
- Z6II (2020)
- Z7II (2020)

=== Olympus ===
- E-10 (2000)
- E-20 (2001)
- C-5050 Zoom (2002)
- C-8080 Wide Zoom (2004)
- E-330/EVOLT E-330 (2006)
- PEN E-PL3 (2011)
- OM-D E-M5 (2012)
- PEN E-PL5(*) (2012)
- XZ-2 iHS (2012)
- PEN E-PL6(*) (2013)
- PEN E-P5 (2013)
- OM-D E-M1 (2013)
- Stylus 1 (2013)
- Stylus TG-850(*) (2014)
- OM-D E-M10 (2014)
- PEN E-PL7(*) (2014)
- Stylus 1s (2014)
- Stylus TG-860(*) (2015)
- OM-D E-M10 II (2015)
- Stylus Tough TG-870(*) (2016)
- TG-Tracker (2016)
- PEN E-PL8(*) (2016)
- OM-D E-M10 Mark III (2017)
- PEN E-PL9(*) (2018)
- PEN E-PL10(*) (2019)
- OM-D E-M10 Mark IV(*) (2020)
- PEN E-P7(*) (2021)

=== Panasonic ===
- Lumix DMC-GF6(*) (2013)
- Lumix DMC-GX7 (2013)
- Lumix DMC-ZS35/Lumix DMC-TZ55/Lumix DMC-TZ56(*) (2014)
- Lumix DMC-SZ10(*) (2015)
- Lumix DMC-ZS45/Lumix DMC-TZ57/Lumix DMC-TZ58(*) (2015)
- Lumix DMC-GF7(*) (2015)
- Lumix DMC-GF8(*) (2016)
- Lumix DMC-GX85/Lumix DMC-GX80 (2016)
- Lumix DMC-LX10/Lumix DMC-LX15(*) (2016)
- Lumix DMC-GX850/Lumix DMC-GX800/Lumix DMC-GF9(*) (2017)
- Lumix DC-ZS70/Lumix DC-TZ90/Lumix DC-TZ91(*) (2017)
- Lumix GX9 (2018)
- Lumix DC-TZ96(*) (2019)
- Lumix DC-ZS99/Lumix DC-TZ99(*) (2024)

=== Pentax ===
- Optio 230 (2002)
- Optio 330GS (2002)
- X-5 (2012)
- MX-1 (2013)
- 645Z (2014)
- 645Z-IR (2015)
- KP (2017)

=== Praktica ===
- Luxmedia 18-Z36C (2012)

=== Rollei ===
- Powerflex 360 (2012)
- Powerflex 850(*) (2014)

=== Samsung ===
- MV800(*) (2011)
- MV900F(*) (2012)
- NX300 (2013)
- WB2100 (2013)
- NX300M(*) (2014)
- NX mini(*) (2014)
- NX3000(*) (2014)
- NX1 (2014)
- NX500(*) (2015)

=== Sony ===
- Cyber-shot DSC-H9 (2007)
- Alpha DSLR-A300 (2008)
- Alpha DSLR-A350 (2008)
- Cyber-shot DSC-H50 (2008)
- Cyber-shot DSC-HX1 (2009)
- Alpha DSLR-A330 (2009)
- Alpha DSLR-A380 (2009)
- Alpha DSLR-A500 (2009)
- Alpha DSLR-A550 (2009)
- Alpha NEX-3 (2010)
- Alpha NEX-5 (2010)
- Alpha DSLR-A390 (2010)
- Alpha DSLR-A560 (2010)
- Alpha DSLR-A580 (2010)
- Alpha NEX-C3 (2011)
- Cyber-shot DSC-HX100V (2011)
- Alpha NEX-7 (2011)
- Alpha NEX-5N (2011)
- Cyber-shot DSC-HX200V (2012)
- Alpha NEX-F3(*) (2012)
- SLT-A37 (2012)
- Alpha NEX-5R(*) (2012)
- Alpha NEX-6 (2012)
- Alpha NEX-3N(*) (2013)
- Cyber-shot DSC-HX300 (2013)
- Cyber-shot DSC-RX100 II (2013)
- Alpha NEX-5T(*) (2013)
- α7 (2013)
- α7R (2013)
- Cyber-shot DSC-RX10 (2013)
- α5000(*) (2014)
- α6000 (2014)
- α7S (2014)
- Cyber-shot DSC RX100 III(*) (2014)
- α5100(*) (2014)
- α7 II (2014)
- Cyber-shot DSC-WX500(*) (2015)
- Cyber-shot DSC-HX90(*) (2015)
- Cyber-shot DSC-HX90V(*) (2015)
- α7R II (2015)
- Cyber-shot DSC-RX10 II (2015)
- Cyber-shot RX100 IV(*) (2015)
- RX1R II (2015)
- SLT-A68 (2015)
- α6300 (2016)
- Cyber-shot DSC-HX80(*) (2016)
- Cyber-shot DSC-RX10 III (2016)
- α6500 (2016)
- Cyber-shot RX100 V(*) (2016)
- Cyber-shot DSC-HX350 (2016)
- α9 (2017)
- Cyber-shot DSC-RX10IV (2017)
- α7R III (2017)
- α7 III (2018)
- Cyber-shot RX100 VI(*) (2018)
- Cyber-shot HX95(*) (2018)
- Cyber-shot HX99(*) (2018)
- α6400(*) (2019)
- RX0 II(*) (2019)
- α7R IV (2019)
- Cyber-shot DSC-RX100 VII(*) (2019)
- α6100(*) (2019)
- α6600(*) (2019)
- α9 II (2019)
- α1 (2021)

=== Vivikai ===
- DC-1550(*) (2011)

=== Vivitar (ViviCam iTwist series) ===
- 5028(*) (2010)
- X018(*) (2010)
- 7028(*) (2010)
- X028(*) (2010)
- T126(*) (2011)
- F129(*) (2011)
- F536(*) (2011)
- T028(*) (2012)
- X014(*) (2012)
- T022(*) (2012)
- F124(*) (2012)

=== Yongnuo ===
- YN455(*) (2021)

== Digital cameras with a double-hinged tilting screen ==
=== Fujifilm ===
- X-T2 (2016)
- GFX 50S (2017)
- X-T100 (2018)
- X-T3 (2018)
- GFX 100 (2019)
- GFX 100S (2021)
- GFX 50S II (2021)
- X-T5 (2022)
- GFX 100 II (2023)
- GFX 100S II (2024)

=== Nikon ===
- Z9 (2021)
- Z8 (2023)

=== Panasonic ===
- Lumix DC-S1/S1R (2019)

== Digital cameras with a swivel screen ==
=== BenQ ===
- G1 (2012)

=== Canon ===
- PowerShot Pro70 (1998)
- PowerShot G1 (2000)
- PowerShot Pro90 IS (2001)
- PowerShot G2 (2001)
- PowerShot G3 (2002)
- PowerShot G5 (2003)
- PowerShot A80 (2003)
- PowerShot S1 IS (2004)
- PowerShot Pro1 (2004)
- PowerShot G6 (2004)
- PowerShot A95 (2004)
- PowerShot S2 IS (2005)
- PowerShot A610 (2005)
- PowerShot A620 (2005)
- Powershot S3 IS (2006)
- PowerShot A630 (2006)
- PowerShot A640 (2006)
- PowerShot TX1 (2007)
- PowerShot S5 IS (2007)
- PowerShot A650 IS (2007)
- PowerShot SX1 IS (2008)
- PowerShot SX10 IS (2008)
- PowerShot SX20 IS (2009)
- PowerShot G11 (2009)
- EOS 60D (2010)
- PowerShot G12 (2010)
- PowerShot SX30 IS (2010)
- EOS Rebel T3i/EOS 600D (2011)
- PowerShot SX40 HS (2011)
- PowerShot G1X (2012)
- EOS 60Da (2012)
- EOS Rebel T4i/EOS 650D (2012)
- PowerShot SX50 HS (2012)
- EOS Rebel T5i/EOS 700D (2013)
- EOS 70D (2013)
- PowerShot SX60 HS (2014)
- EOS Rebel T6i/EOS 750D (2015)
- EOS Rebel T6s/EOS 760D (2015)
- PowerShot G5X (2015)
- EOS 80D (2016)
- EOS 77D/EOS 9000D (2017)
- EOS Rebel T7i/EOS 800D (2017)
- EOS Rebel SL2/EOS 200D/EOS Kiss X9 (2017)
- EOS 6D Mark II (2017)
- PowerShot G1 X Mark III (2017)
- EOS M50/EOS Kiss M (2018)
- EOS R (2018)
- PowerShot SX70 (2018)
- EOS RP (2019)
- EOS Rebel SL3/EOS 250D/EOS Kiss X10 (2019)
- EOS 90D (2019)
- EOS Ra (2019)
- EOS Rebel T8i/EOS 850D (2020)
- EOS R6 (2020)
- EOS R5 (2020)
- EOS M50 Mark II (2020)
- EOS R3 (2021)
- EOS R5C (2022)
- EOS R10 (2022)
- EOS R7 (2022)
- EOS R6 Mark II (2022)
- EOS R50 (2023)
- EOS R8 (2023)
- EOS R1 (2024)
- EOS R5 Mark II (2024)
- PowerShot V1 (2025)
- EOS R50 V (2025)
- EOS R6 Mark III (2025)

=== Casio ===
- EX-P505 (2005)
- Exilim TRYX/EX-TR100 (2011)
- EX-TR150 (2012)
- EX-TR200 (2012)
- EX-TR10 (2013)
- EX-TR15 (2013)
- EX-TR35 (2014)
- EX-TR50/EX-TR500 (2014)

=== Fujifilm ===
- FinePix HS50 EXR (2013)
- FinePix S1 (2014)
- X-A7 (2019)
- X-T200 (2020)
- X-T4 (2020)
- X-S10 (2020)
- X-H2S (2022)
- X-H2/X-H2S (2022)
- X-S20 (2023)
- X-M5 (2024)

=== Kodak ===
- EasyShare-One (2005)
- Pixpro AZ651 (2014)

=== Konica Minolta ===
- DiMAGE A200 (2004)

=== Leica ===
- V-Lux 2 (2010)
- V-Lux 3 (2011)
- V-Lux 4 (2012)
- V-Lux Typ 114 (2014)
- V-Lux 5 (2019)

=== Nikon ===
- Coolpix 5000 (2001)
- Coolpix 5700 (2002)
- Coolpix 5400 (2003)
- Coolpix 8700 (2004)
- Coolpix 8400 (2004)
- Coolpix 8800 (2004)
- D5000 (2009)
- D5100 (2011)
- Coolpix P7700 (2012)
- D5200 (2012)
- Coolpix P520 (2013)
- Coolpix S6600 (2013)
- Coolpix P7800 (2013)
- D5300 (2013)
- Coolpix P600 (2014)
- Coolpix S6900 (2014)
- D5500 (2015)
- Coolpix P610 (2015)
- Coolpix S9900 (2015)
- Coolpix P900 (2015)
- Coolpix B700 (2016)
- D5600 (2016)
- Coolpix P1000 (2018)
- Coolpix P950 (2020)
- Zfc (2021)
- Z30 (2022)
- Zf (2023)
- Z6III (2024)
- Z50II (2024)
- Coolpix P1100 (2025)
- Z5II (2025)
- Z5IIC (2026)
- ZR (2025)

=== Olympus ===
- C-5060 WideZoom (2003)
- C-7070 WideZoom (2005)
- E-3 (2007)
- E-30 (2008)
- E-620 (2009)
- E-600 (2009)
- E-5 (2010)
- OM-D E-M5 II (2015)
- PEN-F (2016)
- OM-D E-M1 II (2016)
- OM-D E-M1X (2019)
- OM-D E-M5 III (2019)
- OM-D E-M1 Mark III (2020)

=== OM Digital Solutions ===
- OM-1 (2022)
- OM-5 (2022)
- OM-1 Mark II (2024)
- OM-3 (2025)
- OM-5 II (2025)

=== Panasonic ===
- Lumix DMC-FZ30 (2005)
- Lumix DMC-FZ50 (2006)
- Lumix DMC-L10 (2007)
- Lumix DMC-G1 (2008)
- Lumix DMC-GH1 (2009)
- Lumix DMC-G2 (2010)
- Lumix DMC-FZ100 (2010)
- Lumix DMC-GH2 (2010)
- Lumix DMC-G3 (2011)
- Lumix DMC-FZ150 (2011)
- Lumix DMC-G5 (2012)
- Lumix DMC-FZ60/FZ62 (2012)
- Lumix DMC-FZ200 (2012)
- Lumix DMC-GH3 (2012)
- Lumix DMC-G6 (2013)
- Lumix DMC-GH4 (2014)
- Lumix DMC-FZ1000 (2014)
- Lumix DMC-G7/Lumix DMC-G70 (2015)
- Lumix DMC-FZ300 (2015)
- Lumix DMC-GX8 (2015)
- Lumix DMC-FZ2500/FZ2000 (2016)
- Lumix DMC-G80/G81/G85 (2016)
- Lumix DC-GH5 (2017)
- Lumix DC-G9 (2017)
- Lumix DC-GH5S (2018)
- Lumix DC-FZ1000 II (2019)
- Lumix DC-G90/G91/G95 (2019)
- Lumix DC-G100/DC-G110 (2020)
- Lumix DC-S5 (2020)
- Lumix DC-GH5II/DC-GH5M2 (2021)
- Lumix DC-S5 II/II X (2023)
- Lumix DC-G9 II (2023)
- Lumix DC-S9X (2024)
- Lumix DC-G97 (2024)

=== Pentax ===
- Optio 750Z (2004)
- K-S2 (2015)
- K-70 (2016)
- KF (2022)

=== Protax ===
- DC600 (2010)
- D3000 (2013)

=== Ricoh ===
- RDC-7 (2000)
- RDC-i700 (2000)
- RDC-i500 (2001)
- Caplio RR-1 (2001)

=== Samsung ===
- Digimax V40 (2004)
- Digimax V50 (2004)
- Digimax V60 (2004)
- Digimax V70 (2004)
- TL500/EX1 (2010)
- NX20 (2012)
- EX2F (2012)
- NX30 (2014)

=== Sony ===
- Cyber-shot DSC-R1 (2005)
- SLT-A55 (2010)
- SLT-A33 (2010)
- SLT-A65 (2011)
- SLT-A77 (2011)
- SLT-A57 (2012)
- SLT-A99 (2012)
- SLT-A58 (2013)
- SLT-A77 II (2014)
- SLT-A99 II (2016)
- ZV-1 (2020)
- α7S III (2020)
- α7C (2020)
- FX3 (2021)
- ZV-E10 (2021)
- α7 IV (2021)
- FX30 (2022)
- ZV-1 Mark II (2023)
- α6700 (2023)
- α7CR (2023)
- α7C II (2023)
- ZV-E10 II (2024)

=== Vivikai ===
- DC600 (2010)

== Digital cameras with a tilt-and-articulating screen ==
=== Panasonic ===
- Lumix DC-S1H (2019)
- Lumix DC-GH6 (2022)
- Lumix DC-GH7 (2024)
- Lumix DC-S1RII (2025)
- Lumix DC-S1IIE (2025)
- Lumix DC-S1II (2025)

=== Sony ===
- α7R V (2022)
- α9 III (2023)
- α1 II (2024)
- α7 V (2025)

== Digital cameras with a cross-tilt screen ==
=== Pentax ===
- K-1 (2016)
- K-1 II (2018)

== Accessories ==
Aftermarket products are available which can be fitted to static screen cameras. These reflect the screen image, or capture and duplicate the image.

== See also ==
- Swivel lens
- Waist-level finder — film camera optical focusing screen viewed from above
