= Waist-level finder =

Type of viewfinder used in some cameras

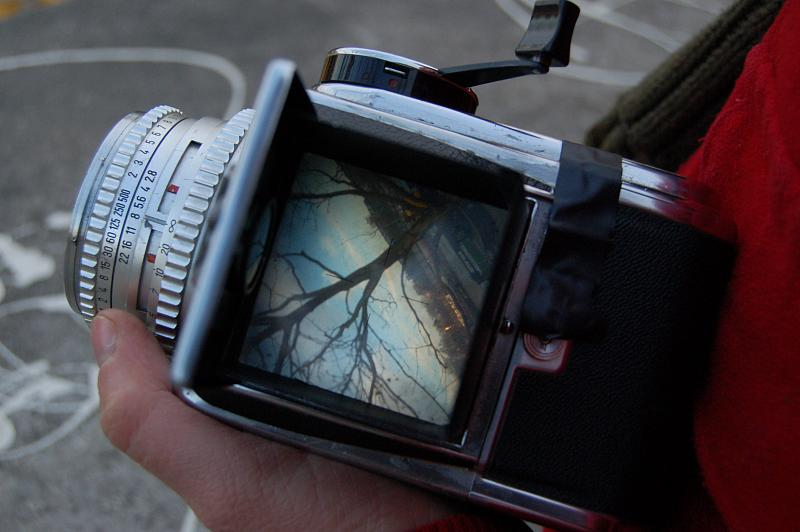
Viewfinder of a Hasselblad series 500 camera.

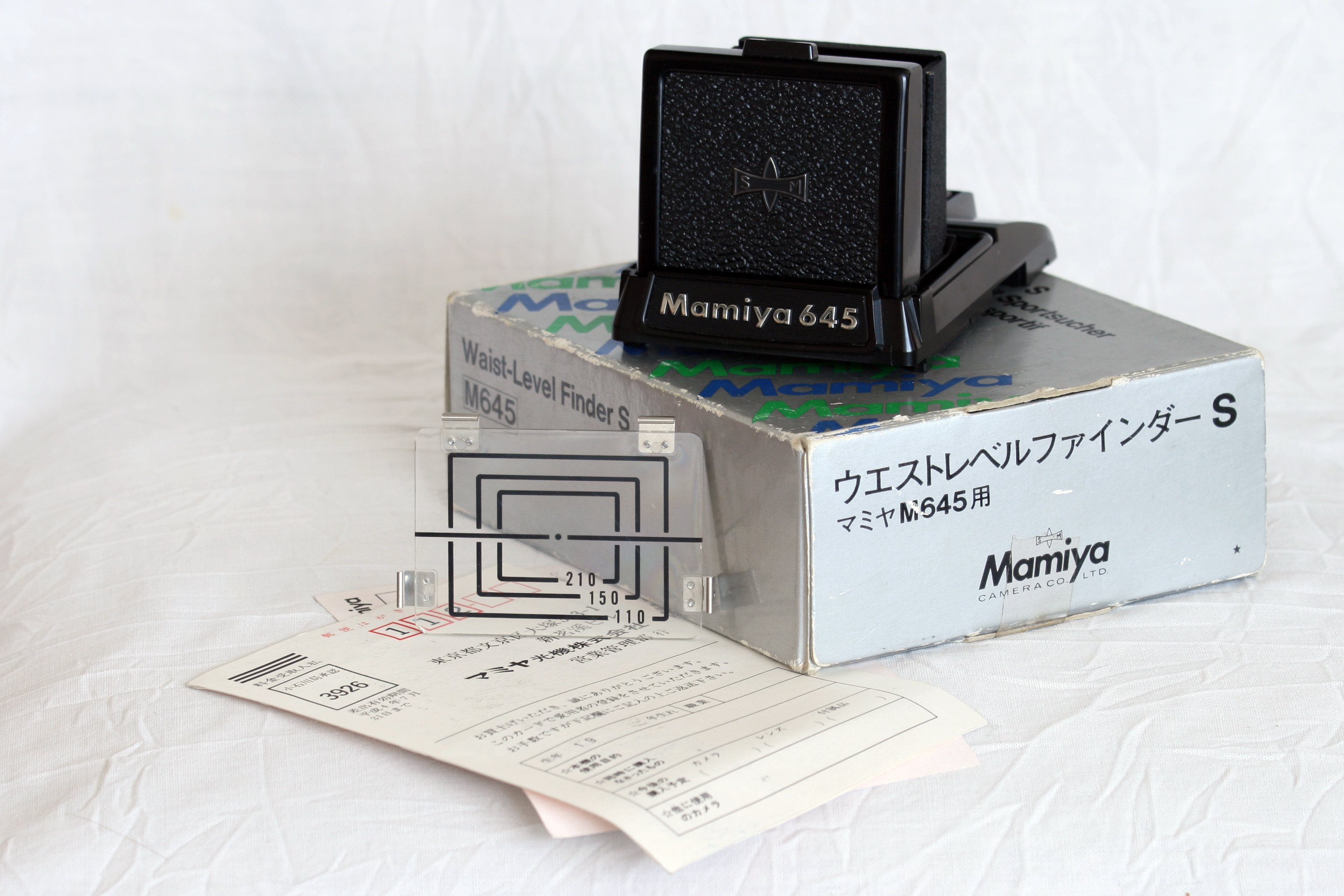
Mamiya 645 1000s waist level finder

The waist-level finder (WLF), also called waist-level viewfinder (WLVF), is a type of viewfinder that can be used on twin lens and single lens reflex cameras. While it is typically found on older medium format cameras, some newer and/or 35 mm cameras have this type of finder (perhaps as an option).

In the reflex camera, the light from the lens is projected onto a focusing screen. The waist-level finder makes this screen viewable from above, where the image is seen upright but reversed left-to-right. This allows the camera user to determine the target area while holding the camera below eye level.

The eye-level finder is an evolution of the waist-level finder, using a roof pentaprism or pentamirror to correct the image while making it viewable through an eyepiece at the rear of the camera.

Some digital cameras have an articulating screen or a swivel lens, this allows the screen to be angled to make it viewable at waist-level. With live preview the screen can be used as a viewfinder.

== Advantages ==
- The photographer is looking down into the camera, attracting less attention compared to an eye-level finder. This makes it better for street or candid photography.
- Even when they know they are being photographed, the subject may feel less "targeted" because the photographer is not looking at them.
- Conversely, for portraits where a rapport between photographer and subject helps to relax the subject, it is possible to maintain eye contact, i.e. without a camera blocking the photographer's face.
- The camera is often held against the belly or resting on something (e.g. table, the lap, etc.), resulting in less motion blur.

== Disadvantages ==
- The image is reversed left-to-right, making it tricky to follow moving subjects.

== See also ==
- Articulating screen — similar functionality for digital cameras
- Fresnel lens
- Microform
