= Nikon Coolpix 5700 =

Digital camera model

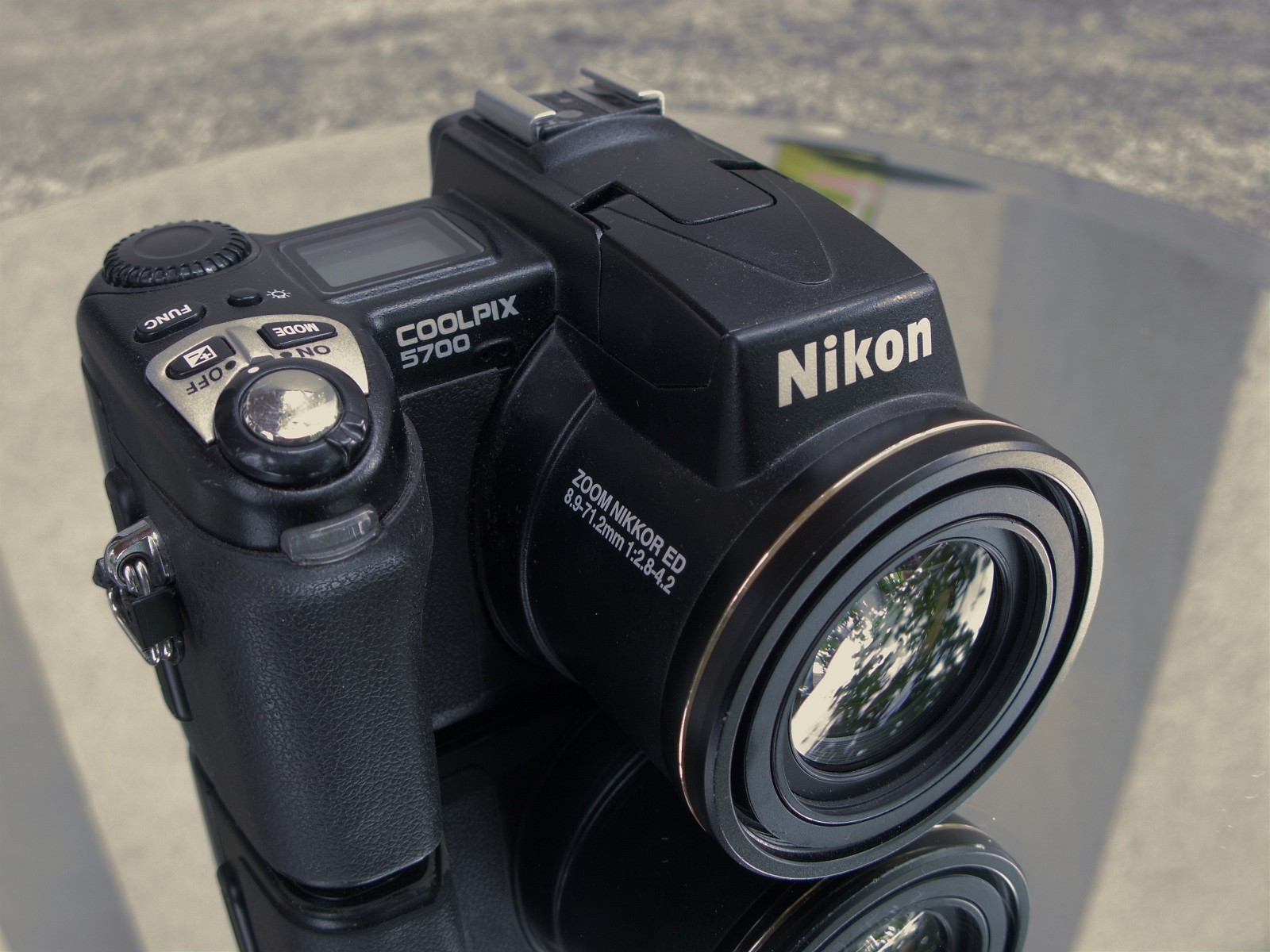

Overview
- Type: Bridge digital camera

Lens
- Lens: 8× Zoom-Nikkor ED lens (35-280mm equivalent zoom range)

Sensor/medium
- Sensor: CCD
- Maximum resolution: 2560×1920 (5 million)
- Film speed: 100 - 800
- Storage media: Compact Flash

Focusing
- Focus modes: Manual, Automatic, and Center-only. Single shot AF or Continuous AF
- Focus areas: 5 zone selectab le

Exposure/metering
- Exposure modes: Automatic, Programmed Auto, Manual, Aperture Priority, Shutter Priority
- Metering modes: Spot, Spot AF Area, Center Weighted, 256 Segment Matrix

Flash
- Flash: Built-in Speedlight with hotshoe

Shutter
- Shutter speed range: 1/4000-second to 8 seconds, 5 minute Bulb mode

Viewfinder
- Viewfinder: Electronic viewfinder

Image processing
- White balance: Automatic, Incandescent, Fluorescent, Daylight, Speedlight, Cloudy, Shade, Preset (Custom). Fine tunable.

General
- LCD screen: 1.5", 111,000 pixels with swivel design
- Battery: EN-EL1 Li-ion
- Weight: 512g (18.1oz)

The Nikon Coolpix 5700 is a 2002 bridge digital camera manufactured and distributed by Nikon, succeeded by the Coolpix 8700, now both discontinued.

A large zoom lens, a magnesium body, and other features make the 5700 unusual for a bridge camera, and it is very different from the later Coolpix cameras. Despite the solid construction, these cameras suffer from unprovoked sensor failure, a common problem for which Nikon has issued a service advisory. This was the last of the Nikon Coolpix series to use the CYGM colour filter. The camera is capable of RAW output with 12-bits of precision.

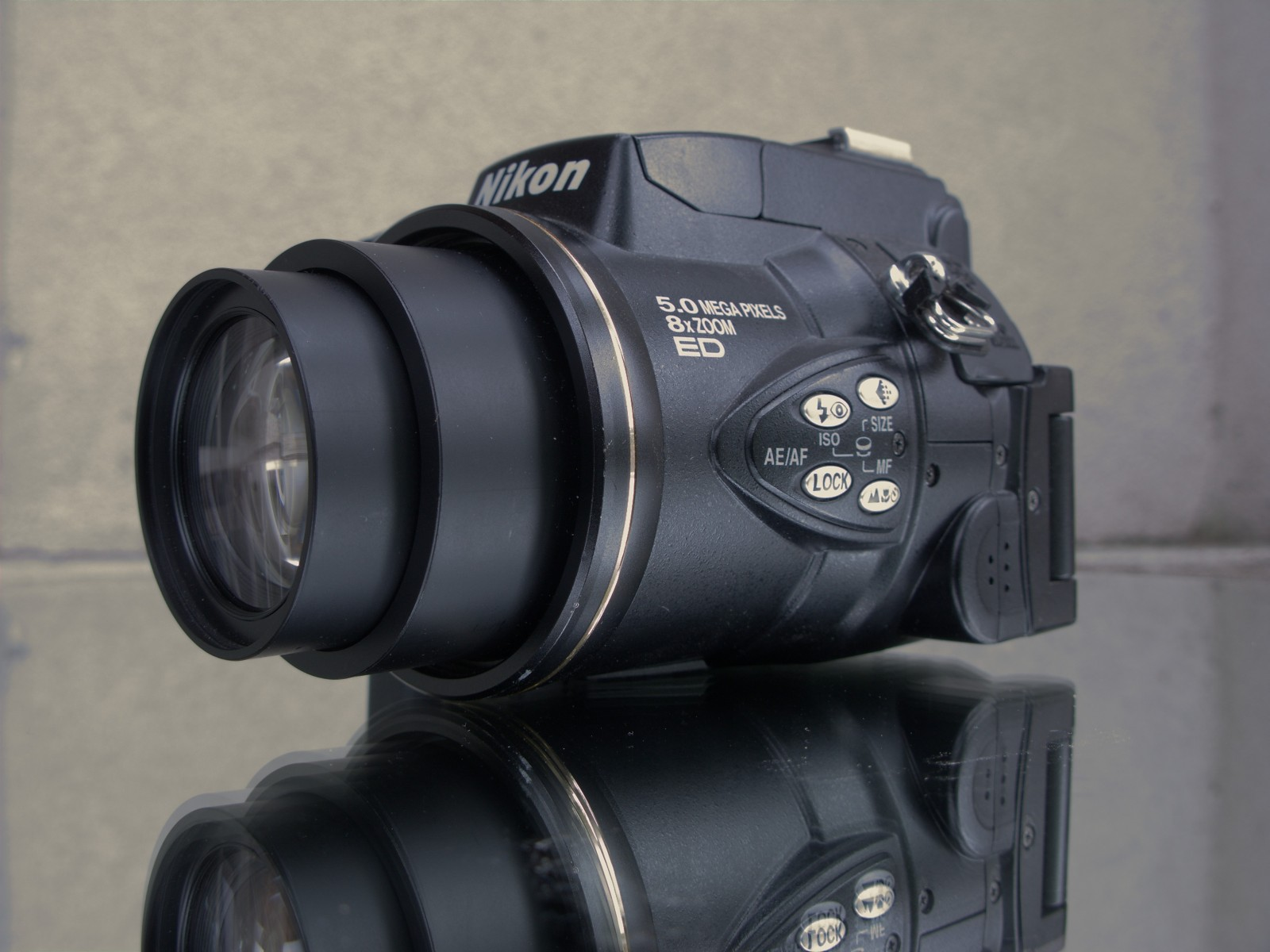

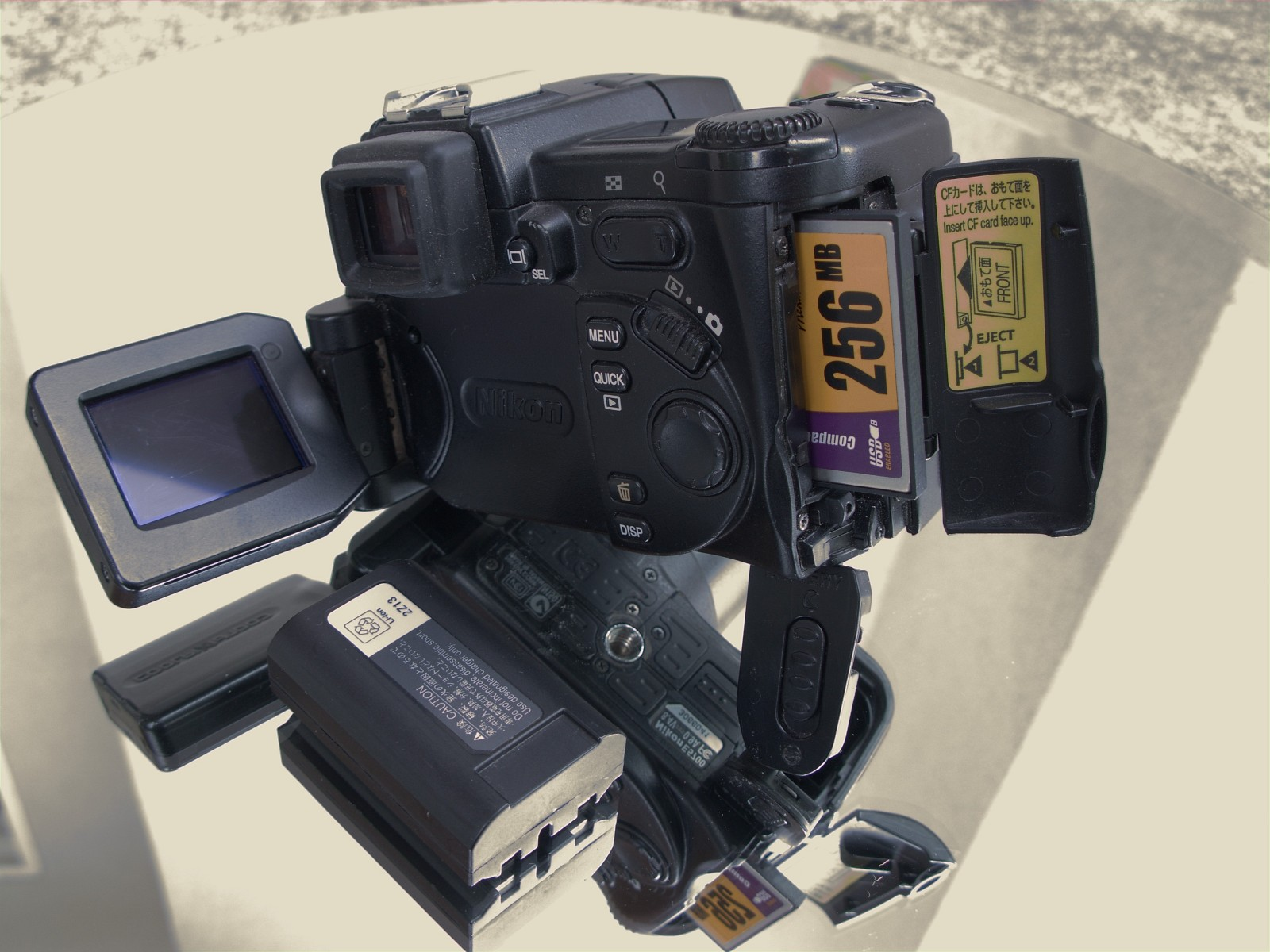
