= Fujifilm FinePix HS50EXR =

DSLR styled ultra-zoom bridge camera released in 2013

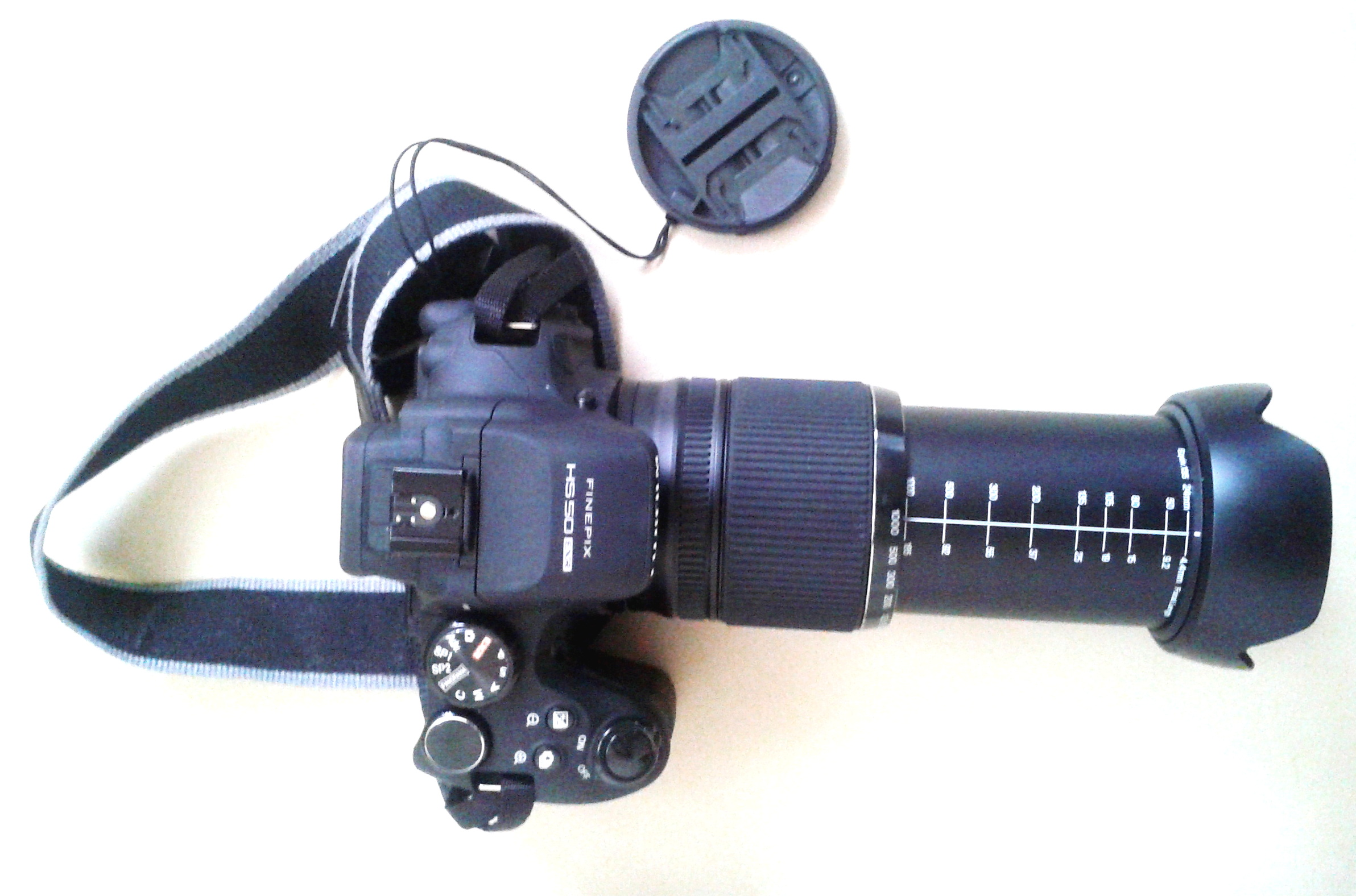

Overview
- Maker: Fujifilm
- Type: Ultra-zoom bridge camera
- Released: January 7, 2013

Lens
- Lens: 4.4-185mm (24-1000mm equivalent)
- F-numbers: f/2.8-f/5.6 at the widest

Sensor/medium
- Sensor type: EXR CMOS
- Sensor size: 6.4 x 4.8mm (1/2 inch type)
- Maximum resolution: 4608 x 3456 (16 megapixels)
- Film speed: ISO 100-12,800
- Recording medium: SD, SDHC or SDXC memory card

Focusing
- Focus: Auto or Manual
- Focus modes: AF-C, AF-S, or Manual

Exposure/metering
- Exposure modes: EXR Auto, Auto, Program (P), Manual (M), Aperture Priority (A), Shutter Priority (S), Custom (C), SP1, SP2, Adv., Motion Panorama
- Metering modes: Multi-Segment, Center-Weighted, and Spot

Flash
- Flash: Built-in, pop-up

Shutter
- Shutter speeds: 1/4000s to 30s
- Continuous shooting: 11 frames per second

Viewfinder
- Viewfinder: Electronic viewfinder
- Frame coverage: 100%

Image processing
- Image processor: EXR Processor II
- White balance: Yes

General
- Video recording: 1920 x 1080 (FHD) @ 60 fps
- LCD screen: Fully articulating 3-inch LCD screen with 920,000 dots
- Data port(s): USB 2.0, mini HDMI, A/V (NTSC and PAL)

Chronology
- Predecessor: Fujifilm FinePix HS30EXR

The Fujifilm FinePix HS50EXR is a DSLR styled ultra-zoom bridge camera announced by Fujifilm on January 7, 2013. It is the last model of the Fujifilm FinePix HS series. At the time of its release, it competed most closely with the Canon PowerShot SX50 HS, another ultra-zoom bridge camera with raw capability. The SX50 has 20% longer maximum effective focal length, but the HS50 has 33% more resolution on the sensor.

== Features ==
- Weight: 636 g (1.402 lb)
- Size: 5.16 x 3.82 x 4.96 inches
- Sensor: 16 megapixel 1/2-inch EXR-CMOS

=== Photographic functions ===
- Sensitivity: ISO 100 to 12,800
- Shutter speed: 30 – 1/4000 s (extremes depending on exposure mode)
- Electronic level
- Histogram display
- Focus check, Focus peaking in Manual focus mode
- Framing guideline
- Film simulation
- Advanced filter: Toy Camera / Miniature / POP COLOR / High-Key / Low-Key / Dynamic Tone / Partial Color / Soft Focus
- Advanced modes: Pro focus, Pro low light, Multiple exposure
- Fujinon 42x optical zoom lens, manually actuated (no motor delay)
  - Focal length: f=4.4–185mm, equivalent to 24–1000mm on a 35mm camera
  - Aperture: f/2.8–11 (wide) f/5.6–11 (telephoto)
- Still images: RAW (.raf) or JPEG
- Storage: SD, SDHC, or SDXC memory cards.
- Flash: Built in pop-up and external hot shoe
- Auto Red-eye removal
- Monitor: Fully articulating 920k pixel 3-inch LCD screen
- Exposure compensation: −2 to +2 EV at 1/3 intervals, in P, S, A, C modes.
- Exposure bracketing: ±1/3 to 1 EV in P, S, A, M and C modes.
- Connections: USB 2.0, mini HDMI, A/V (NTSC and PAL)
- Lens filter mount: 58 mm
- Sweep panoramas are taken in one long exposure with Motion Panorama 360.
- Dynamic range: Has three settings of DR100, DR200 and DR400.
- Continuous shooting modes:
  - Continuous shooting at 11 fps
  - Best frame capture: fires the shutter continuously prior to shutter release when half pressing the shutter button after focus is achieved.
  - Zoom bracketing

=== Video functions ===
- FHD video: up to 1080p at 60 frame/s with stereo audio. Duration limited to 29 minutes or 4 GB (whichever comes first).
- High speed video capture (aka slo-mo) with frame rates up to 1,000 fps
- Movie format: Apple MOV H.264 video codec
- Stereo audio track recorded through two microphones
- Manual Focusing
- Microphone-level adjustment
- External microphone input
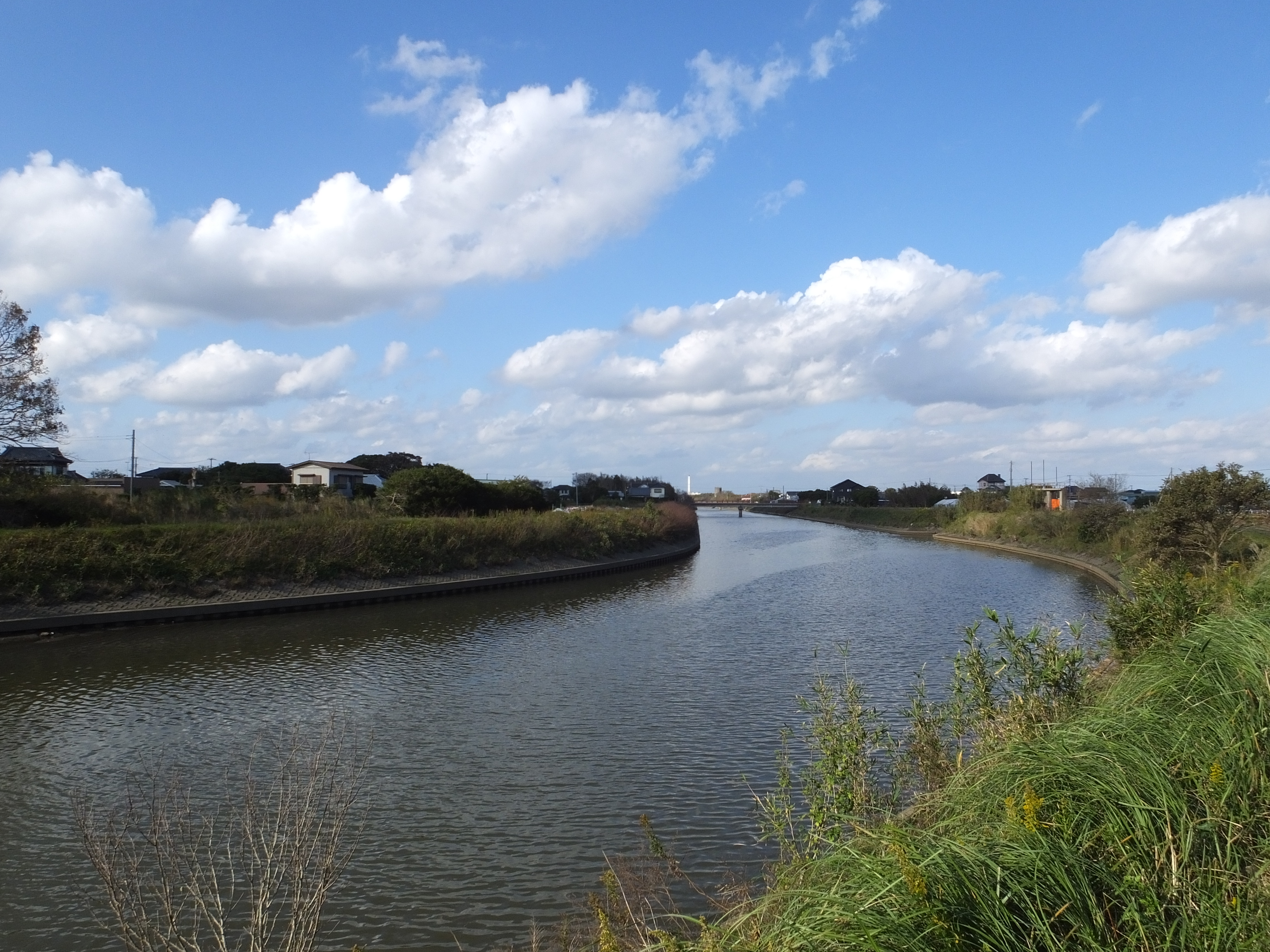
File:Shinkawa_river_Nittama_Asahi_city_Chiba_prefecture_20191104_1435.jpg

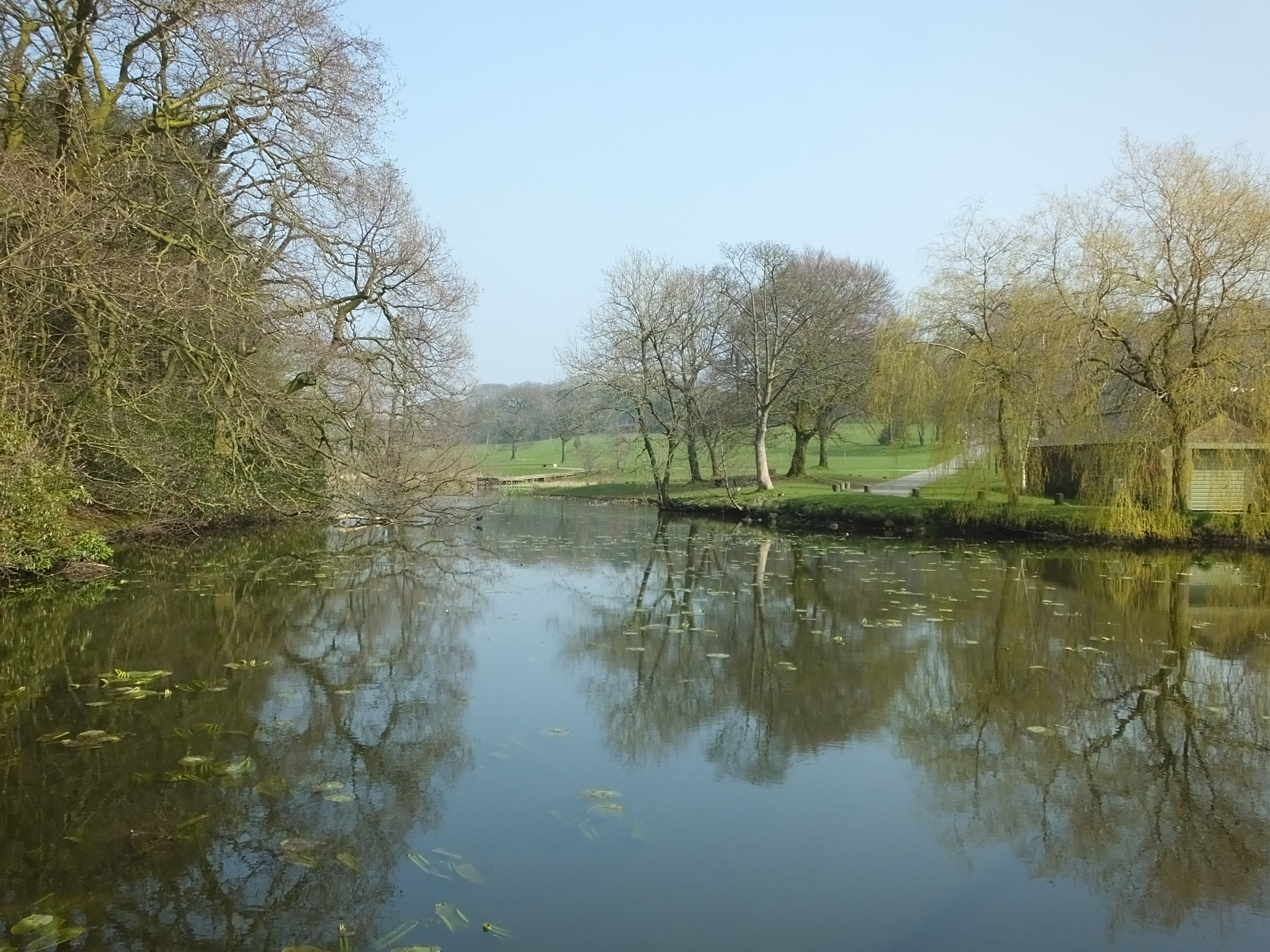
File:Lancaster_University_5_Sports_Centre_lake_6088.JPG

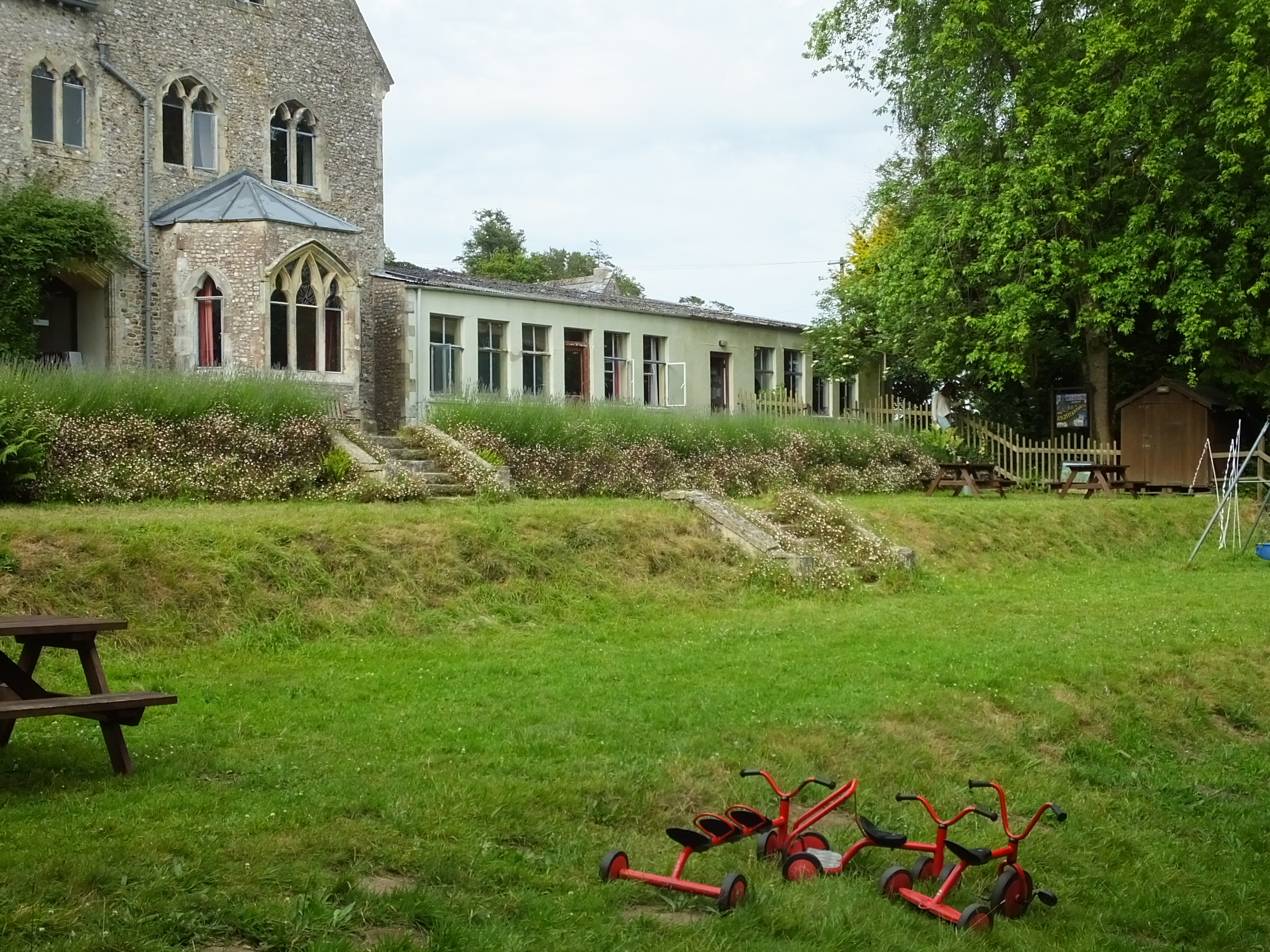
File:Monkton_Wyld_Court_tiered_lawns_and_micropub_7207.JPG

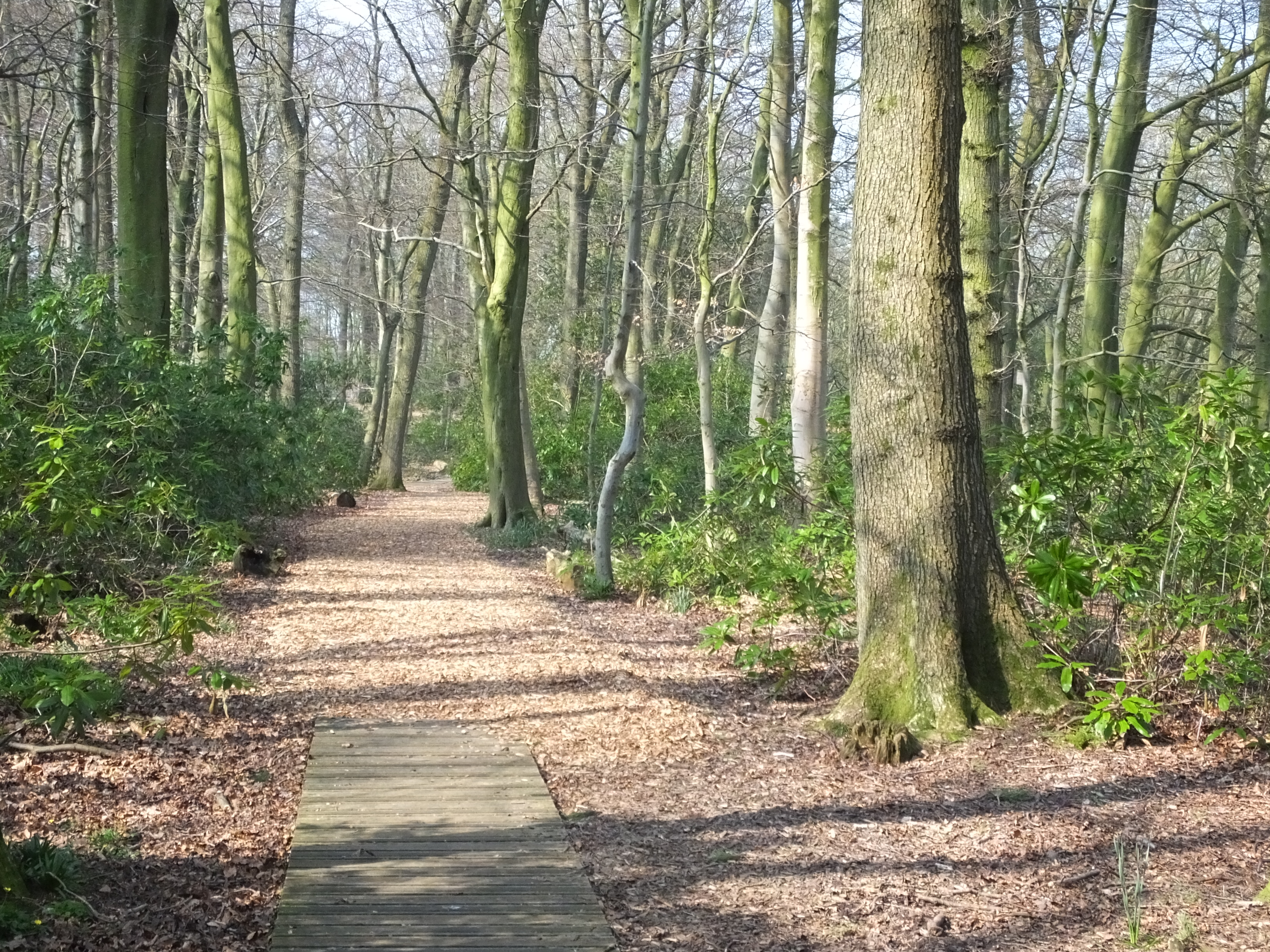
File:Lancaster_University_Woodland_Trail_6077.JPG
