= Nikon Coolpix P520 =

Digital camera model

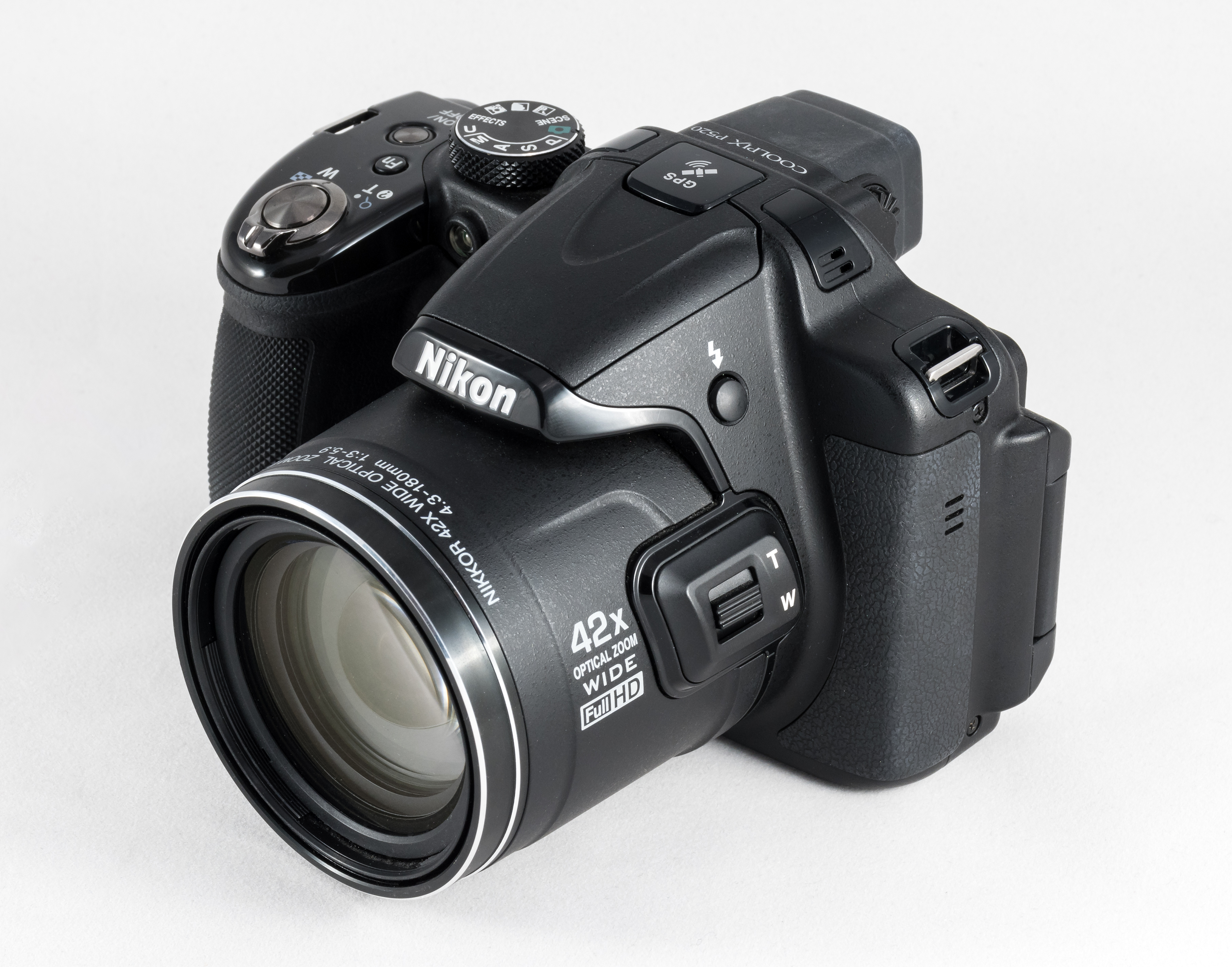

Overview
- Maker: Nikon

Lens
- Lens: 4.3-180mm (24-1000mm equivalent)
- F-numbers: 3.0 - 5.9 (at widest)

Sensor/medium
- Sensor type: BSI-CMOS
- Sensor size: 6.17 x 4.55 mm (1/2.3 inch type)
- Maximum resolution: 4896 x 3672 (18.1 megapixels)
- Film speed: 80 - 3200
- Recording medium: SD, SDHC or SDXC memory card

Shutter
- Shutter speeds: 8 - 1/2000 second (at IS0 80)

General
- LCD screen: 3.2 inches
- Battery: EN-EL5 Lithium-ion battery
- AV port(s): USB, HDMI
- Data port(s): USB
- Dimensions: 125 x 84 x 102mm (4.92 x 3.31 x 4.02 inches)
- Weight: 550 g (19 oz) including battery
- Made in: China

The Nikon Coolpix P520 is a DSLR-styled digital ultrazoom bridge camera announced by Nikon on January 29, 2013.
