= Pentax MX-1 =

Overview
- Maker: Ricoh
- Type: Digital compact camera

Lens
- Lens: 28-112mm (35mm equivalent)
- F-numbers: f/1.8-f/2.5

Sensor/medium
- Sensor type: BSI CMOS
- Sensor size: 7.44 x 5.58mm (1/1.7 inch type)
- Maximum resolution: 4000 x 3000 (4:3)(12 megapixels)
- Film speed: 100-12800 ISO
- Recording medium: SD/SDHC/SDXC
- Storage media: SD

Focusing
- Focus: Autofocus
- Focus modes: AF-S, AF-C, MF.
- Focus areas: 25 Contrast detection focus points

Shutter
- Shutter: Leaf shutter
- Shutter speeds: 1/8000s to 30s
- Continuous shooting: 4.2 fps

Image processing
- White balance: Yes

General
- Video recording: 1.920 x 1.080 (16:9) 30p 1.280 x 720 (16:9) 30p 640 x 480 (4:3) 30p MPG4
- LCD screen: 3 inches with 920,000 dots
- Battery: Pentax D-LI106 (Li-Ion)
- Body features: Brass
- Dimensions: 122 x 61 x 51mm (4.8 x 2.4 x 2.01 inches)
- Weight: 391g including battery
- Made in: Indonesia

The Pentax MX-1 is a digital compact camera by Ricoh Imaging (Pentax) announced on January 7, 2013.

The design of the Pentax MX-1 is reminiscent of that of the original Pentax MX analog camera from 1976. The Pentax MX-1 also uses the same materials as the original Pentax MX, namely brass for the top and bottom plate.

The Pentax MX-1 houses a 12 megapixel 1/1.7" inch BSI CMOS sensor. It enables video recordings up to 1,920 x 1,080 (16:9) 30p.

The camera has sensor based Shake Reduction (SR), a tilt screen as well as a build in pop-up flash.

Its lens is a 28-112mm (35mm equivalent) zoom with a variable aperture of f1.7-f2.5 .
