= Samsung Mirror Pop MV800 =

Digital camera model

Mirror Pop MV800 is a digital camera manufactured by Samsung. It's the first Samsung digital camera with 2 different mirrors.
