= Samsung NX3000 =

Digital mirrorless camera

Overview
- Maker: Samsung

Sensor/medium
- Sensor type: CMOS
- Sensor size: 23.5 x 15.7mm (APS-C type)
- Maximum resolution: 5472 x 3648 (20 megapixels)
- Film speed: 100-25600
- Recording medium: microSD, microSDHC, or microSDXC memory card

Focusing
- Focus areas: 35 focus points

Shutter
- Shutter speeds: 1/4000s to 30s
- Continuous shooting: 5 frames per second

Image processing
- White balance: Yes

General
- LCD screen: 3 inches with 460,800 dots
- Dimensions: 117 x 66 x 39mm (4.61 x 2.6 x 1.54 inches)

The Samsung NX3000 is a rangefinder-styled digital mirrorless camera announced by Samsung on May 8, 2014.

Level	2010		2011	2012	2013		2014	2015
High-End								NX1
Advanced	NX10		NX11	NX20			NX30	
Mid-range		NX100	NX200	NX210	NX300		NX300M	NX500
Mid-range							Galaxy NX	
Upper-entry						NX2000	NX3000	NX3300
Entry-level	NX5			NX1000	NX1100			
Compact-entry							NX mini	NX mini 2
