= Sony Cyber-shot DSC-RX100 IV =

Overview
- Maker: Sony

Lens
- Lens: 24-70mm equivalent
- F-numbers: Maximum aperture: f/1.8 (wide-angle) to f/2.8 (telephoto).

Sensor/medium
- Sensor type: BSI-CMOS
- Sensor size: 13.2 x 8.8mm (1 inch type)
- Maximum resolution: 5472 x 3648 (20 megapixels)
- Recording medium: SD, SDHC or SDXC memory card or Memory Stick Pro Duo/Pro-HG Duo

Focusing
- Focus areas: 25 focus points

Shutter
- Shutter speeds: 1/32000s to 30s
- Continuous shooting: 16 frames per second

Viewfinder
- Viewfinder magnification: 0.59
- Frame coverage: 100%

Image processing
- Image processor: Bionz X
- White balance: Yes

General
- LCD screen: 3 inches with 1,228,800 dots
- Dimensions: 102 x 58 x 41mm (4.02 x 2.28 x 1.61 inches)
- Weight: 298 g (11 oz) including battery

The Sony Cyber-shot DSC-RX100 IV is a digital premium compact camera announced by Sony on June 10, 2015 as the fourth entry in the Sony Cyber-shot DSC-RX100 series. It is one of a pair of cameras launched together by Sony that use their new stacked CMOS sensor. The other camera is the Sony Cyber-shot DSC-RX10 II, a model providing a larger lens and greater zoom, but less compact body.

Compared to its predecessors, the RX100 IV also has a faster electronic shutter and increased read-out speed for video, which will also result in a reduction in rolling shutter effect and allow high speed video to be captured.

The camera was succeeded by the RX100 V, which improved upon some of the issues such as buffer and heating that the RX100 IV suffered from particularly in recording video.

== See also ==
- Sony Cyber-shot DSC-RX100 series
- List of large sensor fixed-lens cameras
