= Olympus PEN E-PL9 =

Digital camera

Overview
- Maker: Olympus Corp.
- Released: February 2019

Lens
- Lens mount: Micro Four Thirds

Sensor/medium
- Sensor type: CMOS
- Sensor size: 17.3 x 13mm (Four Thirds type)
- Maximum resolution: 4608 x 3456 (16 megapixels)
- Film speed: Auto, 200-6400 (expandable to 100-25600)
- Recording medium: RAW, JPEG (Super fine, fine, normal)
- Storage media: SD/SDHC/SDXC card (UHS-I supported)

Focusing
- Focus: Contrast Detect AF
- Focus modes: Multi-area Center, Selective single-point, S-AF, C-AF, AF Tracking, AF Touch (on screen), Face Detection, Live View, Manual focus
- Focus areas: 121 focus points

Exposure/metering
- Exposure bracketing: ±5 (3, 5 frames at 2/3 EV, 1 EV steps)
- Exposure modes: Auto, P, A, S, M
- Metering modes: Multi, Center-weighted, Highlight-weighted, Spot

Flash
- Flash: Built-in, 7.60 m (at ISO 200)
- Flash synchronization: 1/250 sec

Shutter
- Shutter speeds: 1/4000s to 60s (1/16,000 with e-shutter)
- Continuous shooting: 8.6 frames per second

Viewfinder
- Viewfinder: None

Image processing
- Image processor: TruePic VIII
- White balance: Auto, 6 presets

General
- Video recording: MPEG-4 MOV H.264 Linear PCM, 4K at 30fps, FHD at 30fps and HD at 120fps. 3840 x 2160 30p/102 Mbps, 3840 x 2160 25p/102 Mbps, 3840 x 2160 24p/102 Mbps, 1920 x 1080 30p/52 Mbps, 1920 x 1080 25p/52 Mbps, 1920 x 1080 24p/52 Mbps, 1280 x 720 120p,
- LCD screen: 3 inch touch LCD with 1,040,000 dots; articulated
- Battery: lithium-ion battery BLS-50. 350 shots (CIPA)
- AV port: micro-HDMI
- Data port(s): USB 2.0, WiFi 802.11b/g/n, Bluetooth 4.0 LE, Remote Control via smartphone.
- Dimensions: 117×68×39 mm (4.6×2.7×1.5 in) (4.61 * 2.68 * 1.54″)
- Weight: 380 g (13 oz) including battery

The Olympus PEN E-PL9 is a rangefinder-styled digital mirrorless interchangeable lens camera announced by Olympus Corp. in February 2018. It succeeds the Olympus PEN E-PL8. The E-PL9 was succeeded by the Olympus PEN E-PL10 announced in October 2019.
