= Fujifilm FinePix HS20EXR =

Fujifilm FinePix HS20EXR or Fujifilm FinePix HS22EXR
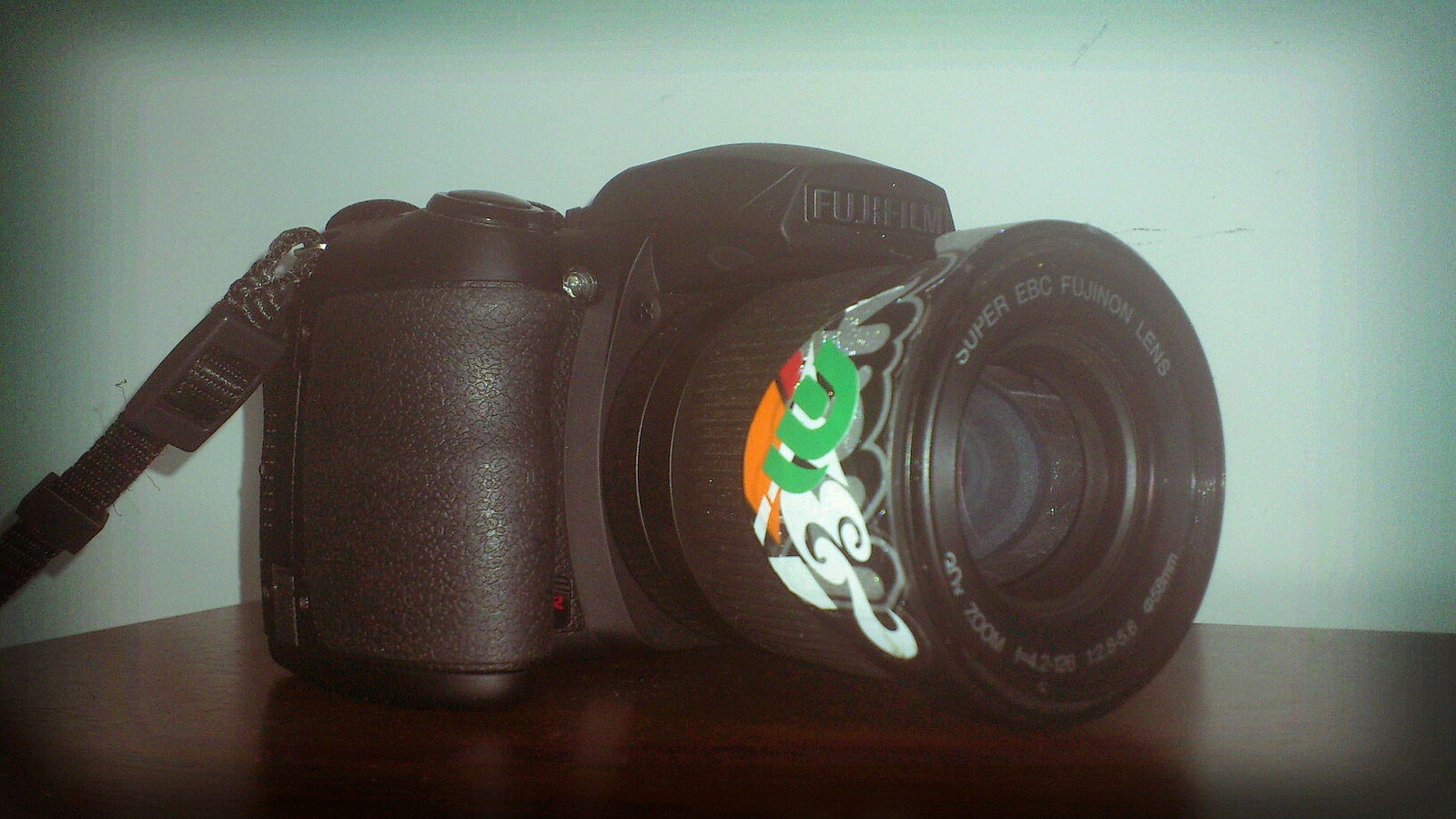
- An HS20EXR camera

Overview
- Maker: Fujifilm

Lens
- Lens: 24-720mm equivalent
- F-numbers: f/2.8-f/5.6 at the widest

Sensor/medium
- Sensor type: EXR CMOS
- Sensor size: 6.4 x 4.8mm (1/2 inch type)
- Maximum resolution: 4608 x 3456 (16 megapixels)
- Film speed: 100-12800
- Recording medium: SD, SDHC, or SDXC memory cards

Shutter
- Shutter speeds: 1/4000s to 30s
- Continuous shooting: 8 frames per second

Viewfinder
- Frame coverage: 97%

Image processing
- Image processor: EXR Processor
- White balance: Yes

General
- Video recording: 1920 x 1080 (FullHD) at 30 fps, 1280 x 720 (720p) at 60 fps, 640 x 480 at 30 or 80 fps, 320 x 112 at 320 fps, 320 x 240 at 160 fps; MPEG-4 file format
- LCD screen: 3 inches with 460,000 dots
- Battery: 4 x AA
- Dimensions: 131 x 91 x 126mm (5.16 x 3.58 x 4.96 inches)
- Weight: 730g including battery

The Fujifilm FinePix HS20EXR or Fujifilm FinePix HS22EXR is a DSLR-styled digital superzoom bridge camera announced by Fujifilm on January 5, 2011. It is the first model in the Fujifilm FinePix HS line to use an EXR sensor.
