= Canon EOS R6 Mark III =

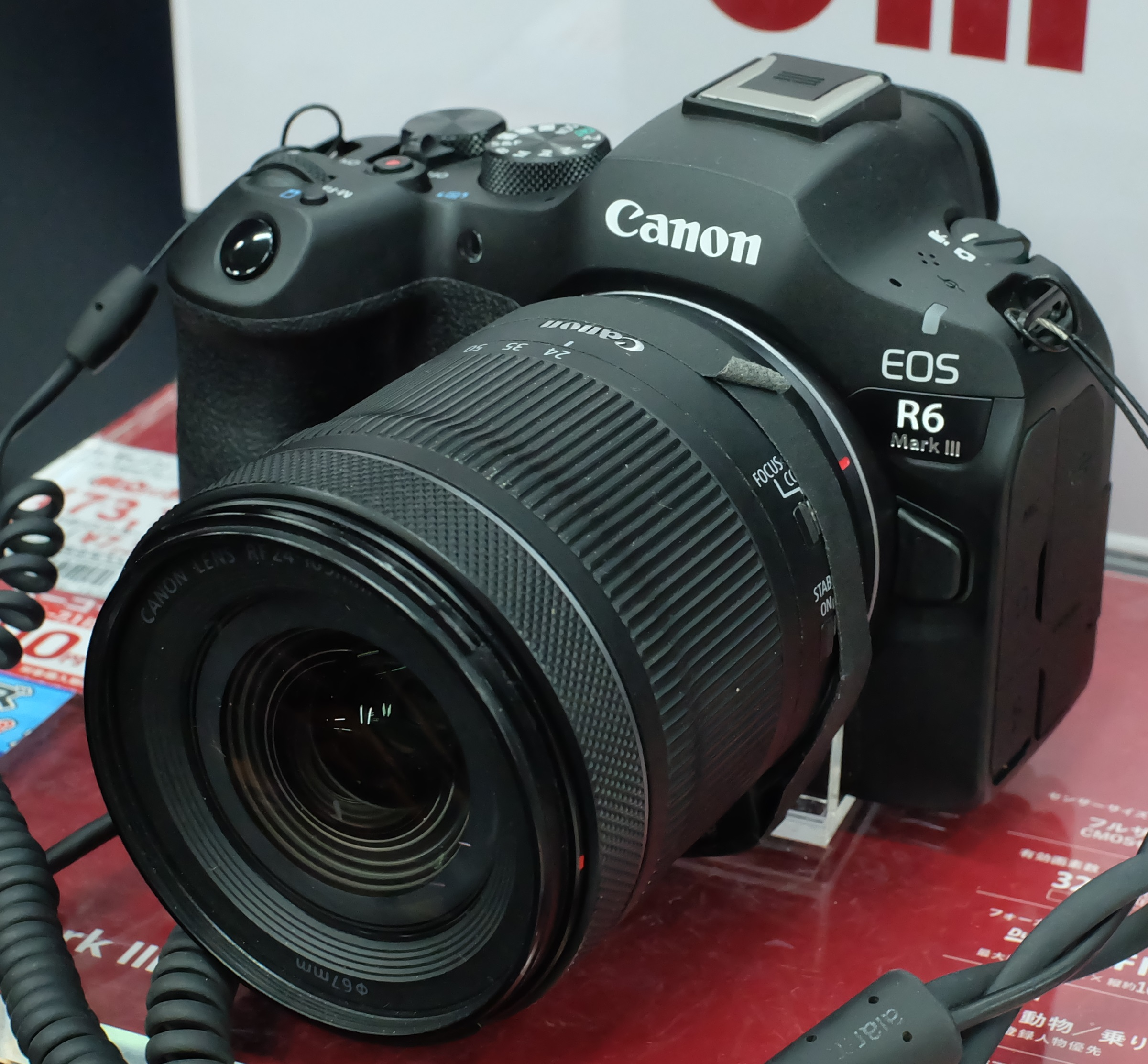
- The Canon EOS R6 Mark III, pictured with an RF 24-105mm F4-7.1 IS STM lens.

Overview
- Maker: Canon Inc.
- Type: Mirrorless interchangeable lens camera
- Released: November 5, 2025
- Intro price: US$2,799 (body only); US$3,150 (with RF 24-105 F4-7.1 IS STM); US$4,050 (with RF 24-105 F4 L IS USM)

Lens
- Lens mount: Canon RF

Sensor/medium
- Sensor: Dual-pixel CMOS sensor
- Sensor type: Full-frame 35mm
- Sensor size: Full-frame (36 × 24 mm)
- Maximum resolution: 6960 × 4640 pixels (32.5 MP)
- Film speed: ISO 100– 64,000, expandable to 50 and 102,400
- Recording medium: SDXC UHS-II compatible and CFexpress-B

Focusing
- Focus: Dual Pixel CMOS autofocus
- Focus modes: One Shot, Servo AF, AI Focus AF

Flash
- Flash exposure compensation: ± 3 stops in 1/3- or 1/2-stop increments

Shutter
- Frame rate: 40 fps with electronic shutter, 12 fps with mechanical shutter
- Shutter speeds: 30 s to 1/8000 s; up to 1/16000 s with electronic shutter

Viewfinder
- Viewfinder: 3.69-million dot OLED EVF
- Viewfinder magnification: 0.76x
- Frame coverage: 100%

Image processing
- Image processor: DIGIC X

General
- Video recording: 7K RAW/60p (with CFexpress card); 4K/60p internal (oversampled from 7K)
- LCD screen: 3.2 in 1.62-million-dot LCD
- Battery: LP-E6P; 270 shots, 390 shots (Power Saving Mode) (EVF); 510 shots, 620 shots (Power Saving Mode) (LCD) (CIPA rating)
- Optional battery packs: BG-R20 grip allows the use of one LP-E6P or LP-E6/N/H battery or two LP-E6P or LP-E6/N/H batteries
- Data port(s): USB-C, Wi-Fi, Bluetooth, HDMI
- Dimensions: 138.4 mm × 98.4 mm × 88.4 mm (5.45 in × 3.87 in × 3.48 in)
- Weight: 609 g (21.5 oz) (body only), 699 g (24.7 oz) (incl. battery and memory card)
- Made in: Japan

Chronology
- Predecessor: Canon EOS R6 Mark II

The Canon EOS R6 Mark III is a full-frame mirrorless interchangeable-lens camera produced by Canon. It was announced as the successor to the Canon EOS R6 Mark II on November 5, 2025.

== Features ==
- A new 32.5 megapixel full-frame CMOS sensor
- Continuous shooting at 12 fps with mechanical shutter / 40 fps with electronic shutter
- DIGIC X image processor
- 7K RAW video recording at 60 fps
- 4K oversampled video recording at 60 fps
- 1080p video recording at 180 fps
- 100% autofocus coverage
- Native ISO range of 100 to 64,000; expandable to 50 and 102,400
- 8,5 stops (7.5 stops peripheral) in-body image stabilization
- UHS-II SD and CFexpress-B memory card slots
- 0.5" 3.69 million dots OLED electronic viewfinder with a 120 fps refresh rate
- Vari-angle LCD touchscreen
- Dual Pixel CMOS AF II
- Weather Resistant

== Software releases ==
On November 24, 2025, the bugfix release 1.0.1 was released. It fixes issues with CFexpress cards being formatted in the camera.

== See also ==
other weather resistant Canon mirrorless cameras from the same period:

- Canon EOS R5 Mark II
- Canon EOS R7
- Canon EOS R8

Sensor	Class	12	13	14	15	16	17	18	19	20	21	22	23	24	25	26
Full-frame	Flagship														_{m} R1 ^{ATS}	
Full-frame	Professional											_{m} R3 ^{ATS}				
Full-frame	Professional										R5 ^{ATSR}				_{m} R5 Mk II ^{ATSR}	
Full-frame	Professional											_{m} R5 C ^{ATCR}				
Full-frame	Advanced										R6 ^{ATS}		_{m} R6 Mk II ^{ATS}			_{m} R6 Mk III ^{ATS}
Full-frame	Advanced									Ra ^{AT}						
Full-frame	Advanced								R ^{AT}							
Full-frame	Midrange													_{m} R8 ^{AT}		
Full-frame	Entry/mid								RP ^{AT}							
APS-C	Advanced												_{m} R7 ^{ATS}			
APS-C	Midrange						M5 ^{FT}						_{m} R10 ^{AT}			
APS-C	Entry/mid		_{x} M ^{T}	M2 ^{T}	M3 ^{FT}			M6 ^{FT}		M6 Mk II ^{FT}						
APS-C	Entry/mid								M50 ^{AT}		M50 Mk II ^{AT}			_{m} R50 ^{AT}		
APS-C	Entry/mid															_{m} R50 V ^{AT}
APS-C	Entry					M10 ^{FT}		M100 ^{FT}		M200 ^{FT}				R100		
Sensor	Class															
Sensor	Class	12	13	14	15	16	17	18	19	20	21	22	23	24	25	26
