= Nikon Coolpix P510 =

Digital camera model

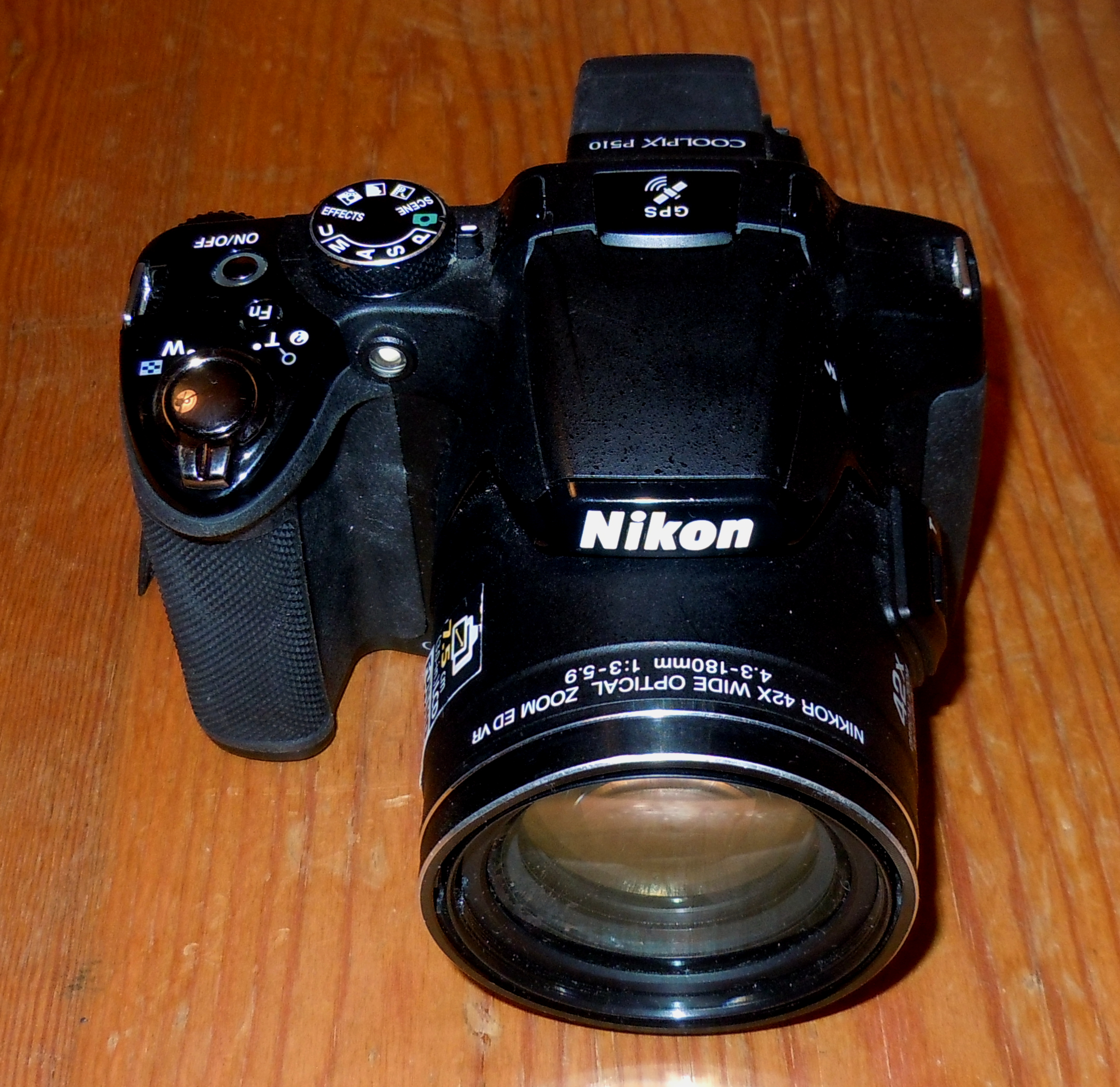

Overview
- Maker: Nikon

Lens
- Lens: 24-1000 mm equivalent
- F-numbers: f/3.0-f/5.9 at the widest

Sensor/medium
- Sensor type: BSI-CMOS
- Sensor size: 6.17 x 4.55 mm (1/2.3 inch type)
- Maximum resolution: 4608 x 3456 (16.1 megapixels)
- Film speed: 100-3200
- Recording medium: SD, SDHC, or SDXC memory card

Image processing
- Image processor: Expeed C2
- White balance: Yes

General
- LCD screen: 3 inches with 921,000 dots
- Dimensions: 120 x 83 x 102 mm (4.72 x 3.27 x 4.02 inches)
- Weight: 555 g (20 oz) including battery

The Nikon Coolpix P510 is an ultrazoom bridge camera announced by Nikon on February 1, 2012.
