= Fujifilm FinePix S9100 =

Digital camera model

Fujifilm Finepix s9600 or Finepix s9100 is a prosumer or bridge digital camera released by Fujifilm in 2006. The camera is an upgrade of the Finepix s9500 or s9000, fixing a number of technical faults such as the Command dial failure. Other upgrades included improved LCD size and quality, image sharpness and low light autofocus.
