= Nikon Coolpix 8700 =

Digital camera model

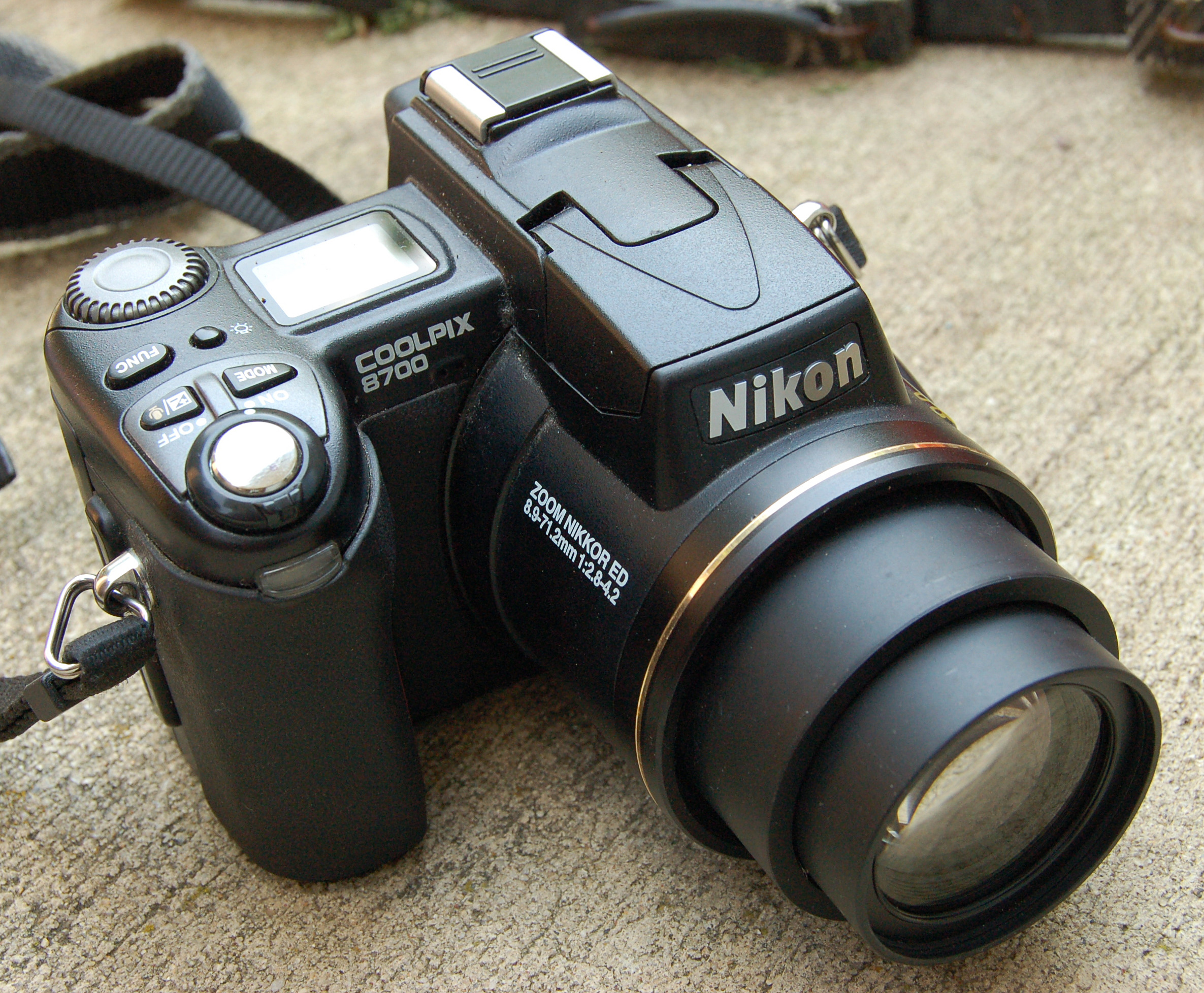

Overview
- Maker: Nikon
- Type: Bridge digital camera

Lens
- Lens: 8× Zoom-Nikkor ED lens (35-280mm equivalent zoom range)

Sensor/medium
- Sensor: CCD
- Maximum resolution: 3,264 × 2,448 (8 million)
- Film speed: 50 - 400
- Storage media: Compact Flash

Focusing
- Focus modes: Manual, Automatic, and Center-only. Single shot AF or Continuous AF
- Focus areas: 5 zone selectable

Exposure/metering
- Exposure modes: Automatic, Programmed Auto, Manual, Aperture Priority, Shutter Priority, and 12 Scene Modes
- Metering modes: Spot, Spot AF Area, Center Weighted, 256 Segment Matrix

Flash
- Flash: Built-in Speedlight with hotshoe

Shutter
- Shutter speed range: 1/4,000-second to 8 seconds, 10 minutes Bulb mode
- Continuous shooting: High Speed: 2.5 frame/s up to 5 pictures, Low Speed: 1.2 frame/s up to 12 pictures, multi-shot 16, Ultra High Speed: 30 frame/s up to 100 pictures at 640×480, 5 shot buffer at 1 frame/s, time lapse, and movie

Viewfinder
- Viewfinder: EVF

Image processing
- White balance: Automatic, Incandescent, Fluorescent, Daylight, Speedlight, Cloudy, Shade, Preset (Custom). Fine tunable

General
- LCD screen: 1.8 in (46 mm), 134,000 pixels with swivel design
- Battery: EN-EL1 Li-ion
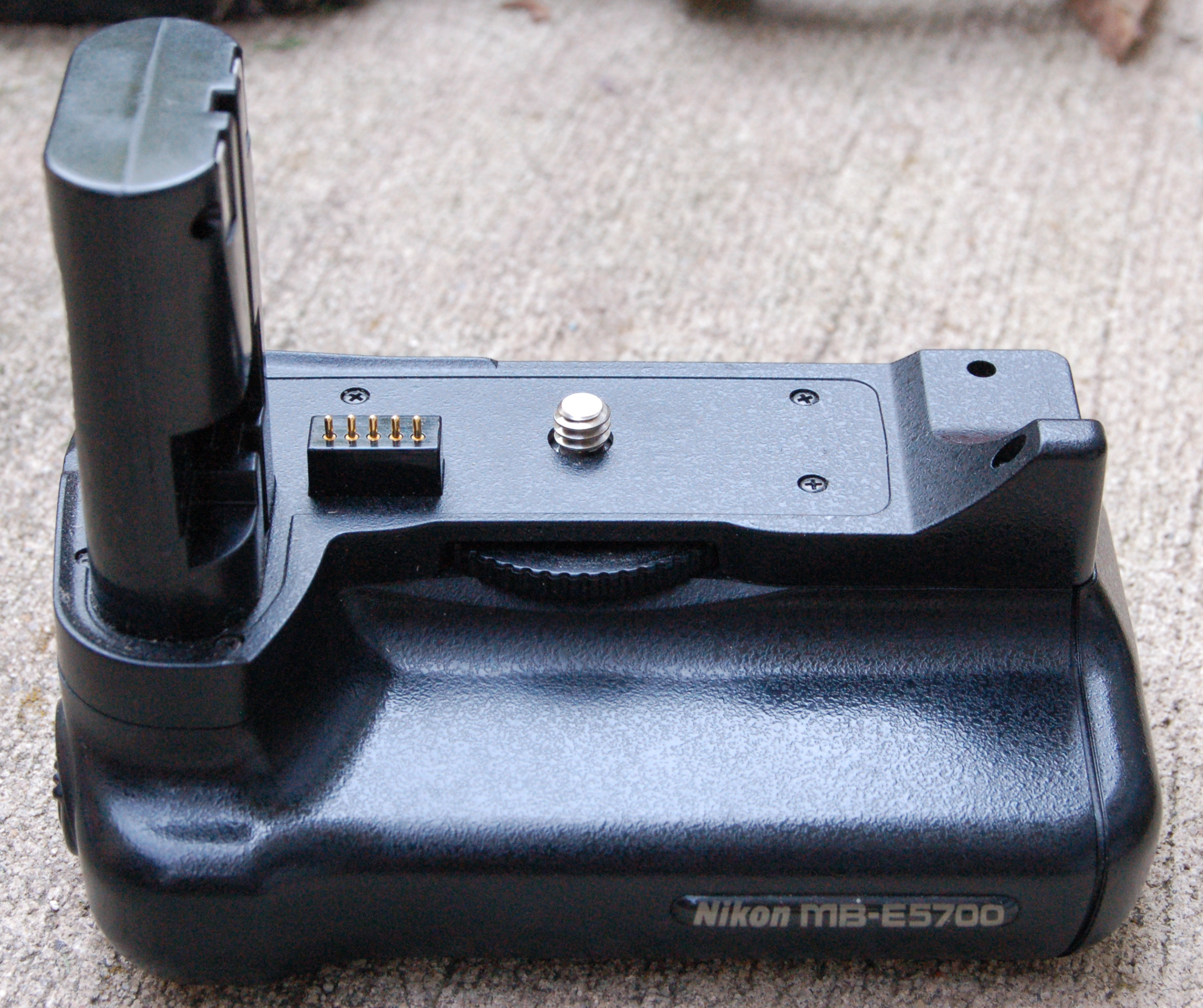
- Optional battery packs: MB-E5700 6-AA Battery Pack
- Weight: 480 g (16.8 oz)

The Coolpix 8700 was a digital camera manufactured and distributed by Nikon. It was introduced in 2004. It featured 8.0 megapixels (effective), and a 8× optical/4× digital zoom. It was part of the Nikon Coolpix line of cameras.

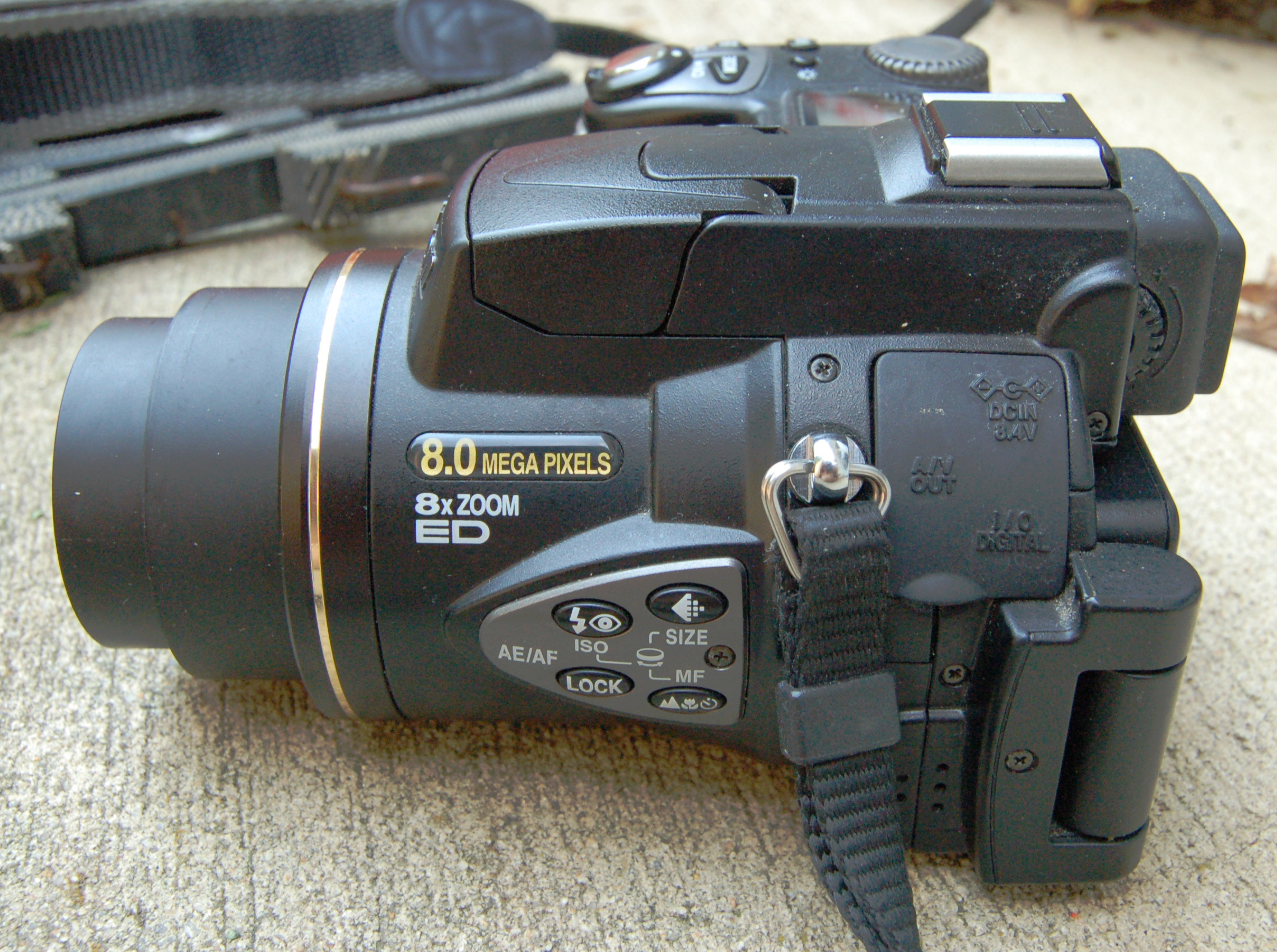

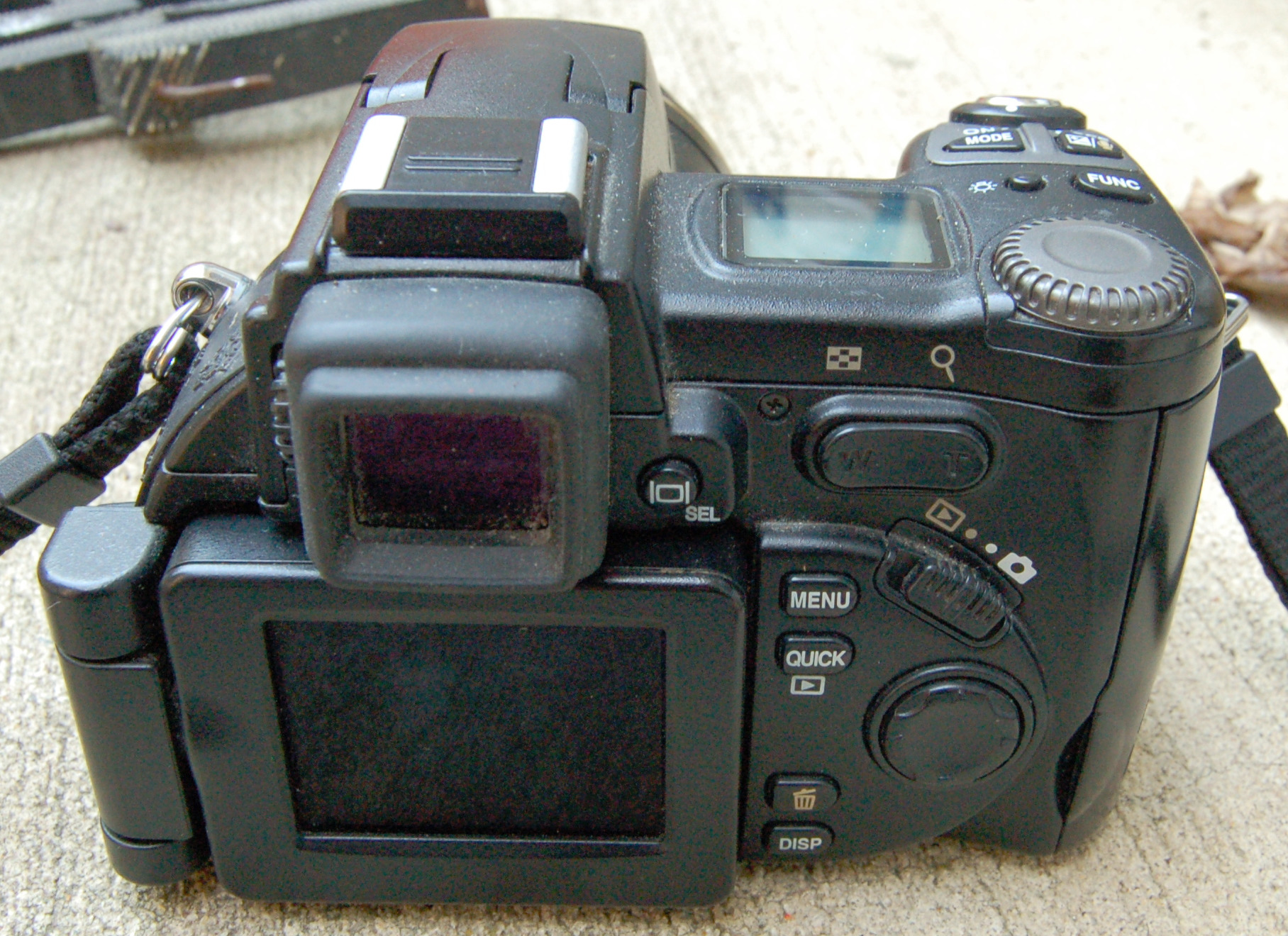

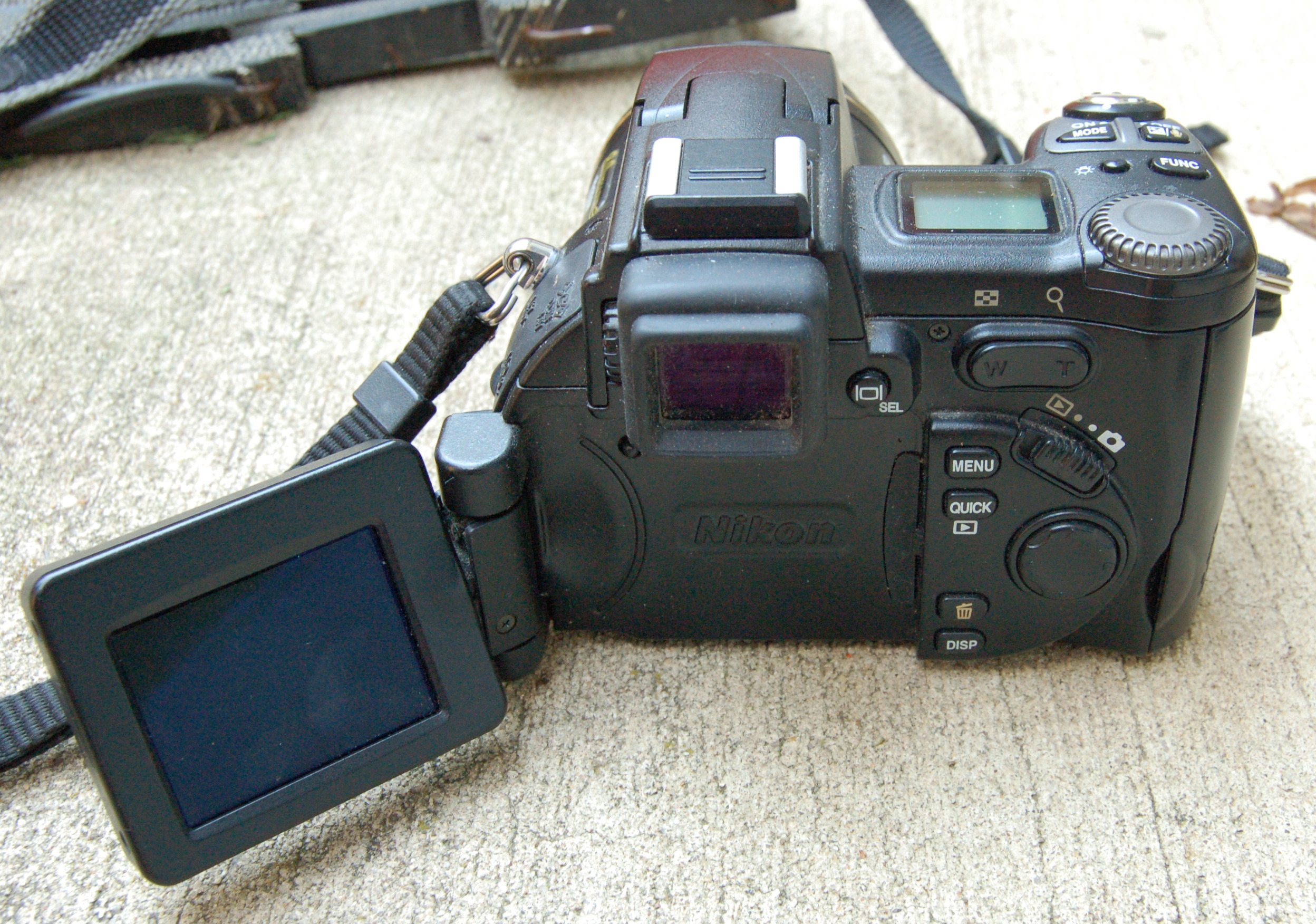

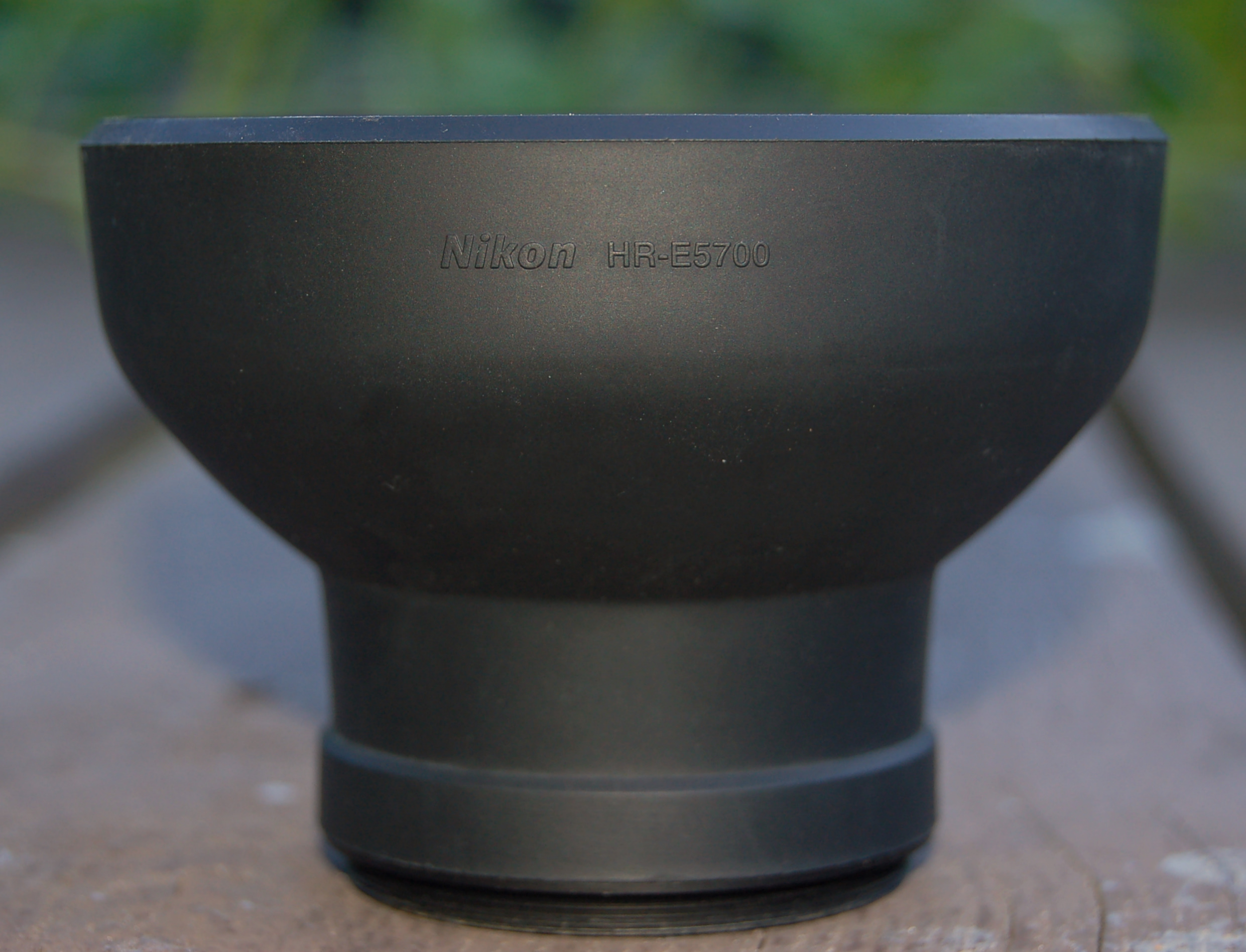
HR-E5700 Lens Hood

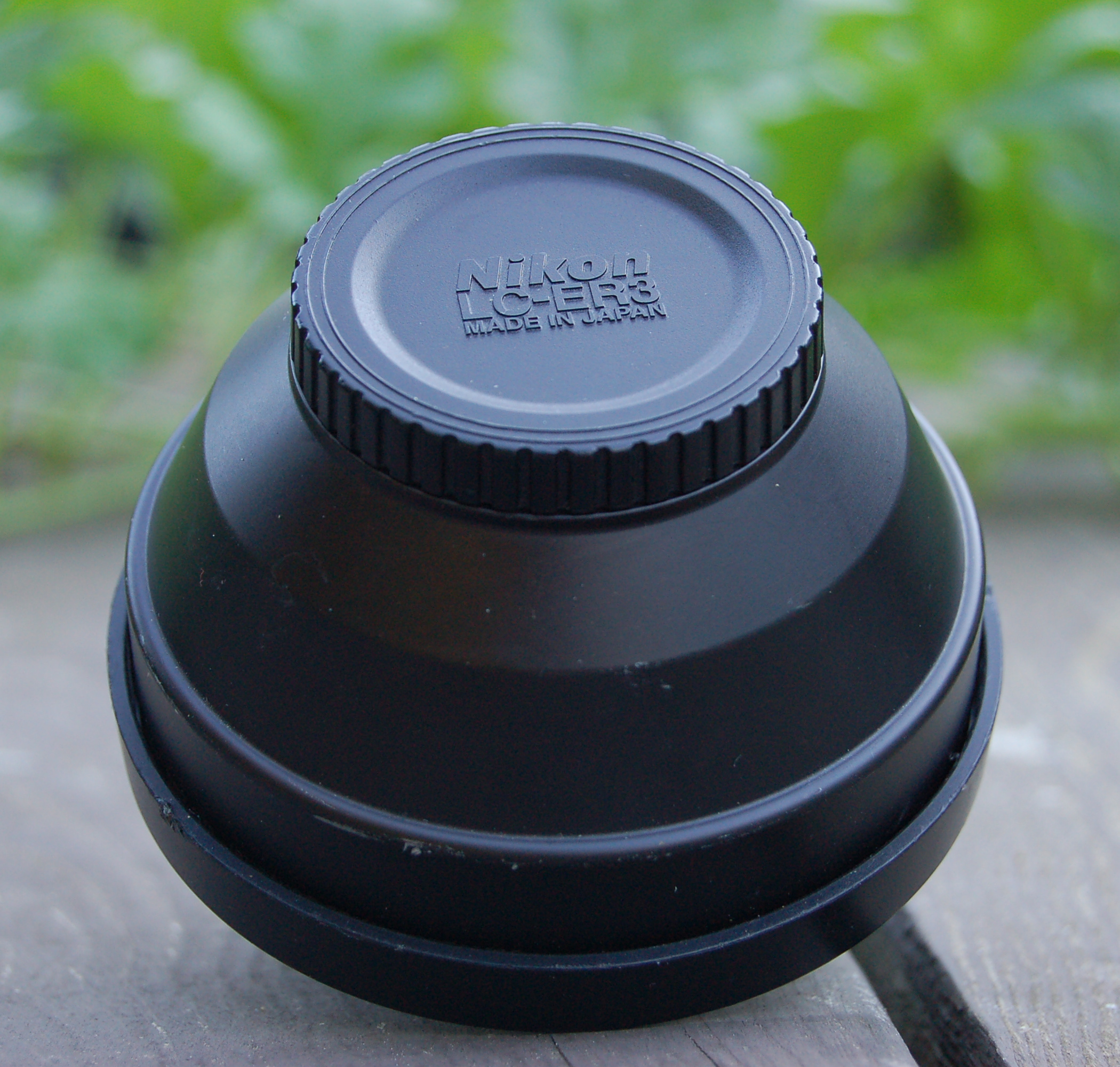
Bottom of WC-E80 0.8× wide angle converter lens

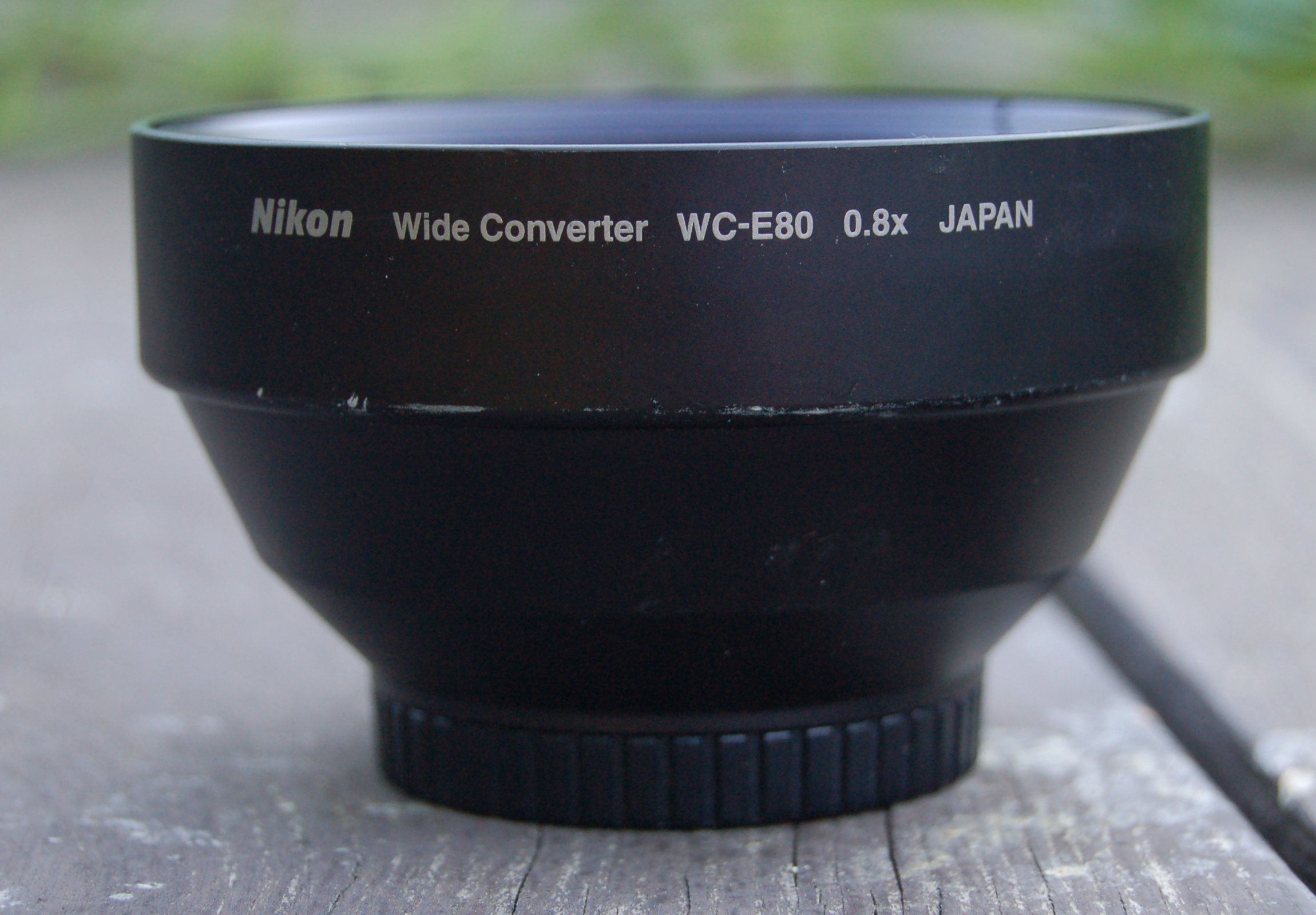
Side of WC-E80 lens

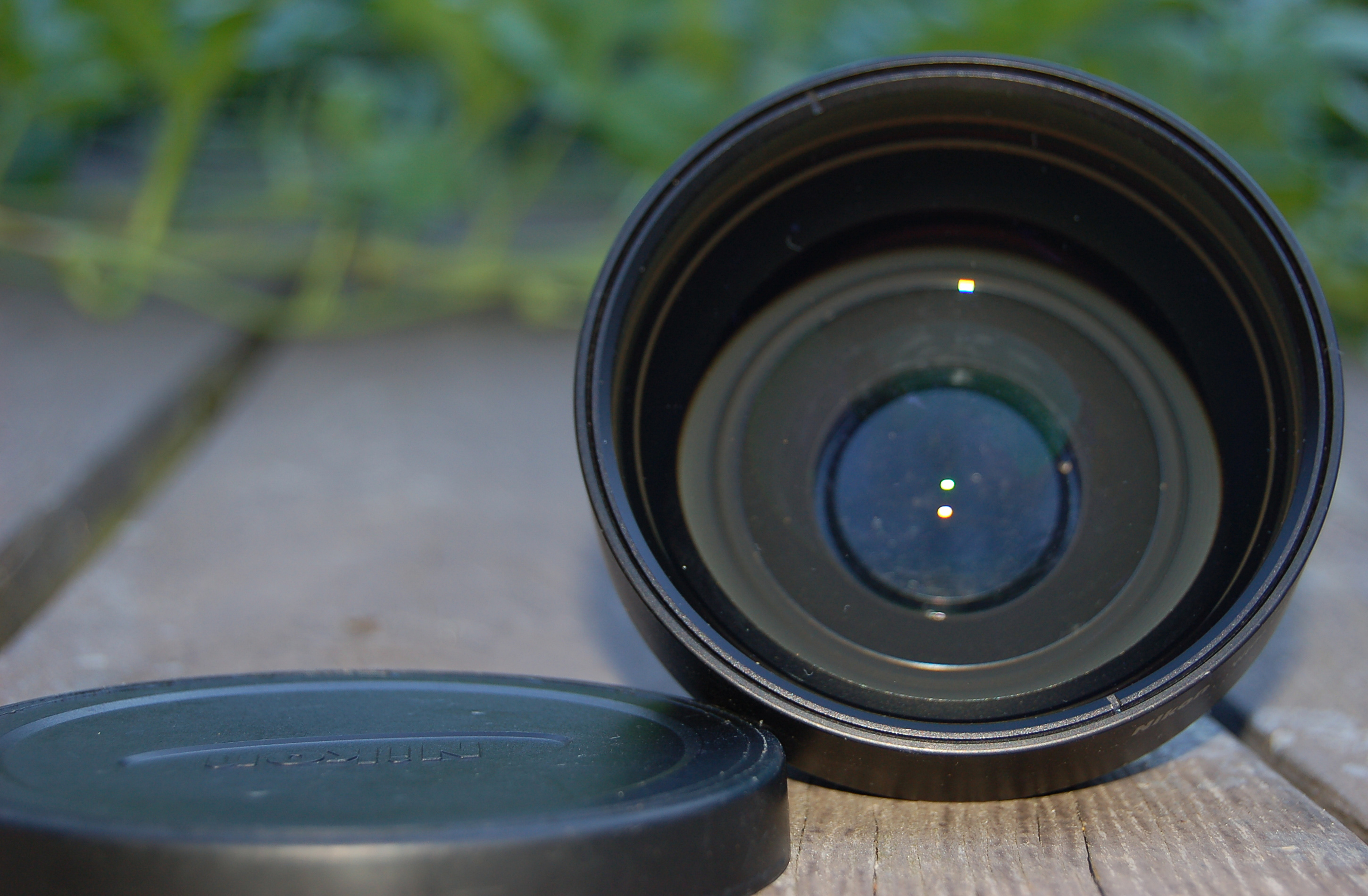
Top of WC-E80 lens

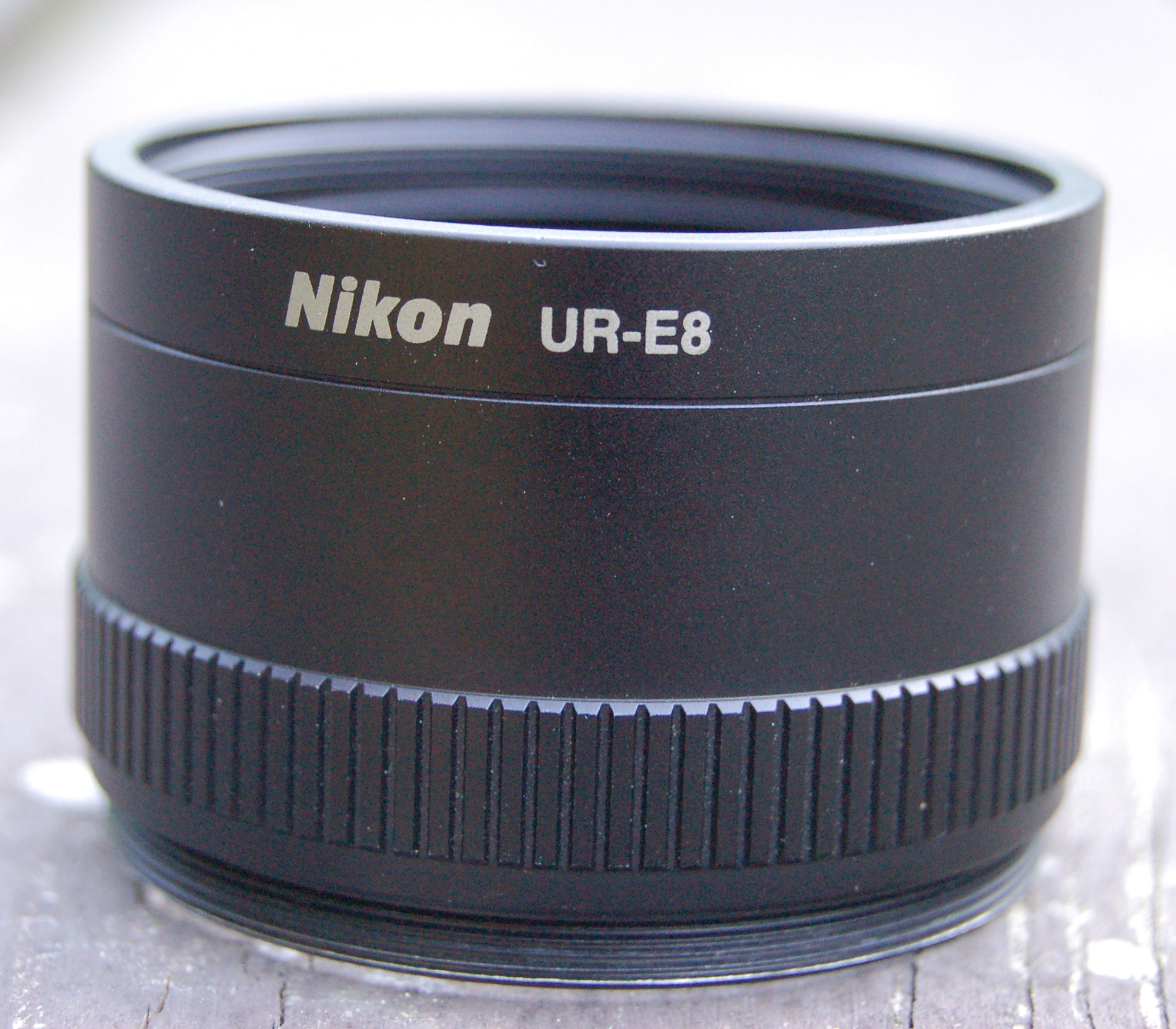
UR-E8 Lens Adapter
