= Fujifilm FinePix HS30EXR =

Fujifilm FinePix HS30EXR or Fujifilm FinePix HS33EXR
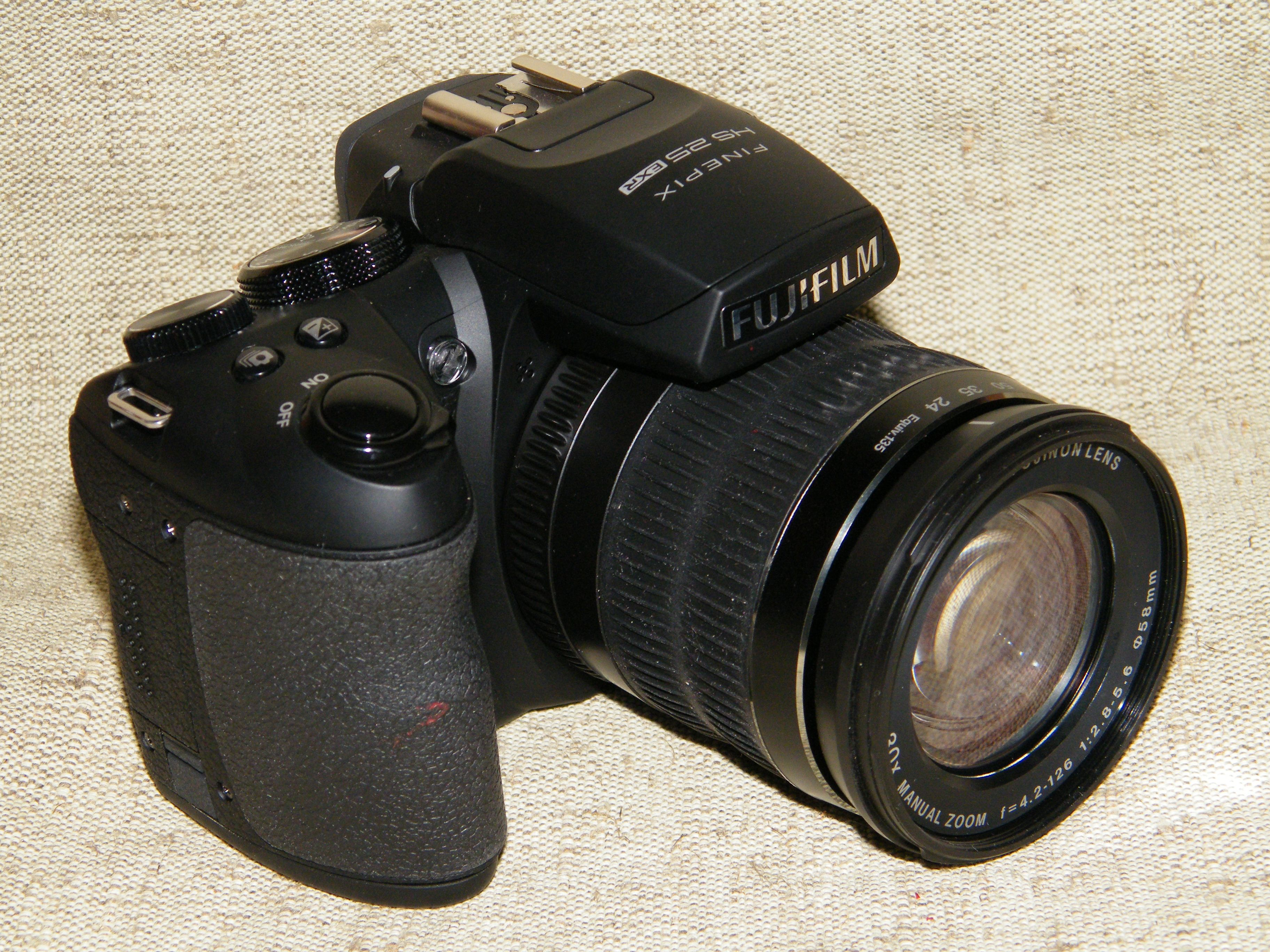

Overview
- Maker: Fujifilm
- Type: Bridge camera

Lens
- Lens: 24-720mm equivalent
- F-numbers: f/2.8-f/5.6 at the widest

Sensor/medium
- Sensor type: EXR CMOS
- Sensor size: 6.4 x 4.8mm (1/2 inch type)
- Maximum resolution: 4608 x 3456 (16 megapixels)
- Film speed: 100-12800
- Recording medium: SD, SDHC, or SDXC memory card

Focusing
- Focus: Autofocus

Flash
- Flash: Built-in, pop-up

Shutter
- Shutter speeds: 1/4000s to 30s
- Continuous shooting: 11 frames per second

Viewfinder
- Frame coverage: 100%

Image processing
- Image processor: EXR
- White balance: Yes

General
- Video recording: 1920 x 1080 (FullHD) at 30 fps, 1280 x 720 (720p) at 30 fps, 640 x 480 (VGA) at 30 fps; MPEG-4 or H.264 file format
- LCD screen: 3 inches with 460,000 dots, tiltable
- Dimensions: 130.6 (W) x 96.6 (H) x 126.0 (D) mm (5.16 x 3.82 x 4.96 inches)

The Fujifilm FinePix HS30EXR or Fujifilm FinePix HS33EXR is a DSLR-styled digital ultrazoom bridge camera announced by Fujifilm on January 5, 2012. Its sister model, known as the Fujifilm FinePix HS25EXR or Fujifilm FinePix HS28EXR, and HS33, HS35. Is identical HS25EXR and HS28EXR except for a lower resolution viewfinder, the use of standard AA batteries rather than the model-specific lithium battery of the HS30EXR, and the omission of RAW support in the HS25EXR. Loaded with batteries and memory card, the HS30EXR weighs 687 grams compared to the HS20EXR's 730 grams.

== Reviews ==
Initial reviews on the HS30EXR have been favourable, with users citing the 30x zoom lens as one of the camera's key benefits. This view was also echoed by a wildlife and safari photographer who tried the camera out in the field.

== Notes and references ==
- http://www.dpreview.com/products/fujifilm/compacts/fujifilm_hs30exr/specifications
