= Canon PowerShot G3 X =

Large sensor digital bridge camera

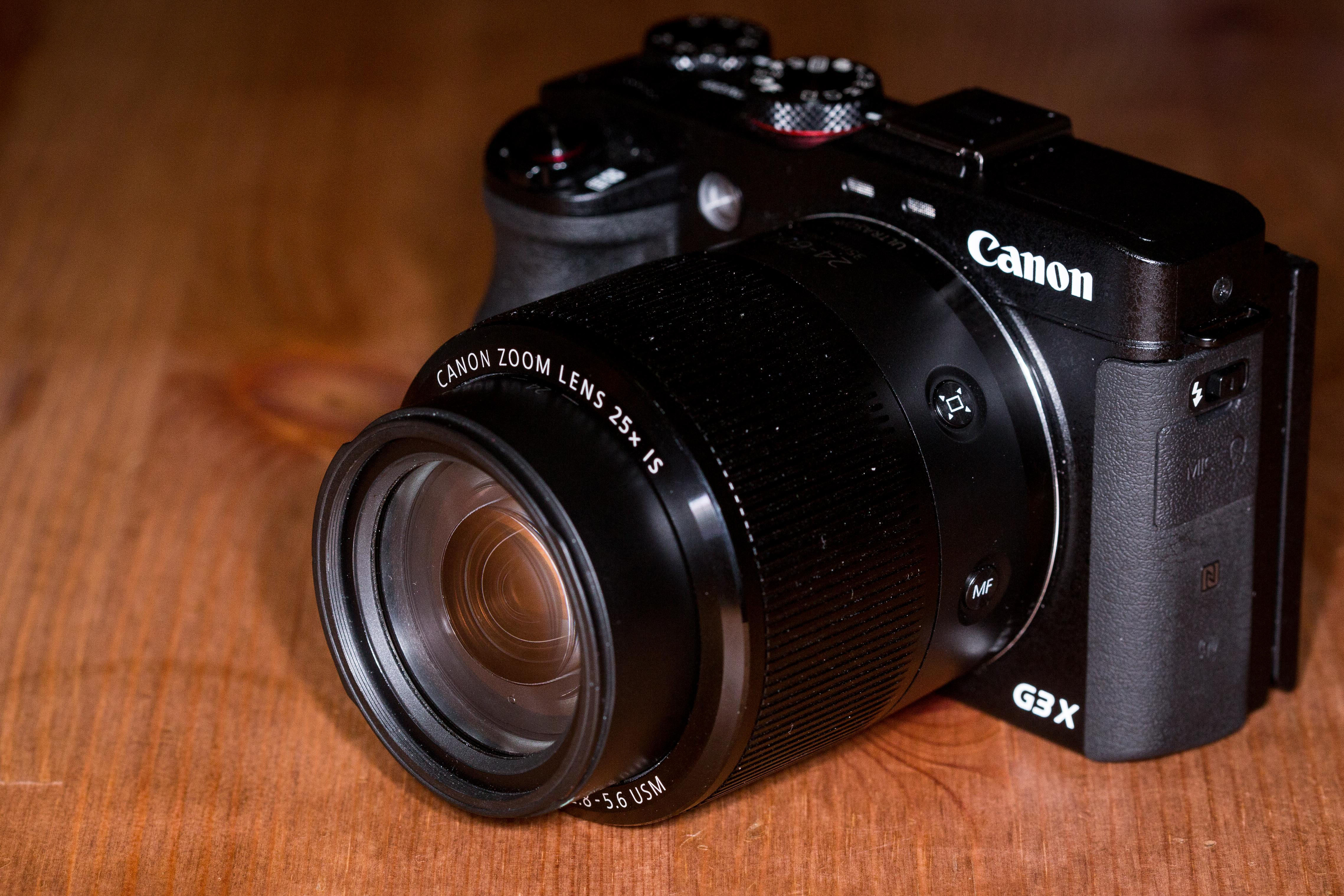

Overview
- Maker: Canon
- Type: Digital superzoom bridge
- Released: June 18, 2015

Lens
- Lens: 8.8-220mm (24-600mm equivalent)
- F-numbers: f/2.8-5.6 at the widest (f/7.6-15 equivalent)

Sensor/medium
- Sensor type: BSI-CMOS
- Sensor size: 13.2 x 8.8mm (1 inch type, 2.7x crop factor)
- Sensor maker: Sony
- Maximum resolution: 5472 x 3648 (20 megapixels)
- Recording medium: SD, SDHC or SDXC memory card; UHS-I compatible

Focusing
- Focus areas: 31 focus points

Shutter
- Shutter speeds: 1/2000s to 30s
- Continuous shooting: 5.9 frames per second

Viewfinder
- Optional viewfinders: EVF-DC1 electronic viewfinder

Image processing
- Image processor: DIGIC 6
- White balance: Yes

General
- Video recording: 1080p at 60/30 or 50/25 or 24 fps, 720p at 25 or 30 fps, 640x480 at 30 or 25 fps; h.264 in MP4 with AAC audio
- LCD screen: 3.2 inches with 1,620,000 dots
- Battery: NB-10L
- Dimensions: 123 x 77 x 105mm (4.84 x 3.03 x 4.13 inches)
- Weight: 733 g (26 oz) including battery

The Canon PowerShot G3 X is a large sensor digital bridge camera announced by Canon on June 18, 2015. It marks Canon's entry into this product category, alongside competitors such as the Panasonic Lumix DMC-FZ1000, Sony Cyber-shot RX10 and RX10 II.

It has the longest focal length zoom range of any Powershot G-Series, from 24-600mm (35mm equivalent) with a maximum aperture of f/2.8 at widest, decreasing to f/5.6 at 600mm. In terms of overall specification it is the most capable of the current-production G-series cameras but this comes at the expense of overall size and weight - it is also the largest and heaviest of the series.

It shares the same 1.0-type ("1-inch") sensor found in the Canon G7 X as well as both the Sony RX100 III and Sony RX10 cameras.

== Features ==
- 3.5mm microphone jack for external microphones or recorders.
- 3.5mm jack for headphones
- PAL/NTSC video output
- 3.2-inch (81 mm) 3:2 aspect ratio LCD monitor, 1.62 million dots
- Live view mode
- Built-in flash
- Auto, Continuous, Servo AF and Manual Focus modes
- Internal monaural speaker, stereo microphone
- Three metering modes, Evaluative, Center Weighted Average & Spot
- ±3 stops in 1/3-stop increment Exposure Compensation, dedicated dial
- sRGB colour space
- ISO 125–12,800
- Continuous drive up to 5.9 frame/s
- SD, SDHC, and SDXC memory card file storage
- Raw and large, superfine JPEG simultaneous recording
- USB 2.0, HDMI control (CEC)
- Approximate weight 0.733 kg (1.62 lb) with battery and card
- NB-10L battery, rated at approx. 300 shots in normal usage/400 shots in ECO mode

== Comparison ==
The Canon PowerShot G3 X offers the largest zoom range of all large sensor bridge cameras (tied with the Sony RX10 III and IV), while being the smallest and lightest in the category. The G3 X is over 30% smaller and lighter than its Sony counterparts.

The size and weight savings are achieved with a smaller aperture at the telephoto end of the zoom range and by making its electronic viewfinder an optional accessory.

== See also ==
- List of large sensor fixed-lens cameras
- List of bridge cameras
