= Nikon Coolpix P1100 =

Digital bridge camera

Overview
- Maker: Nikon
- Type: Bridge camera
- Released: February 5, 2025 (announced)
- Intro price: $1,099 (MSRP)

Lens
- Lens: 4.3–539 mm (24–3000 mm in 35 mm equivalent), Dynamic Fine Zoom up to 6,000 mm (digital)
- F-numbers: f/2.8–8.0 at the widest

Sensor/medium
- Sensor: 6.2 × 4.6 mm (1/2.3 inch type) back-illuminated CMOS
- Sensor type: CMOS
- Sensor size: 6.2 × 4.6 mm (1/2.3 inch type)
- Maximum resolution: 4608 × 3456 (15.9 megapixels), 4624 × 3470 (Nikon RAW .NRW, 16.0 megapixels)
- Recording medium: SD, SDHC or SDXC memory card

Exposure/metering
- Exposure modes: Auto, Scene, Scene Auto Selector, Smart Portrait, Special Effects, Program, Aperture Priority, Shutter Priority, Manual, Fireworks Show, Long Exposure NR
- Metering modes: Matrix, center-weighted, spot

Flash
- Flash: Built-in, GN 12m at ISO 100
- Flash exposure compensation: ±2 EV in 1/3 EV steps

Shutter
- Shutter speeds: 1/4000 – 30 sec

Viewfinder
- Viewfinder: Electronic viewfinder, 1 cm (0.39 in) approx. 2359k-dot OLED, diopter adjustment (–3 to +3 m⁻¹)
- Frame coverage: 99% (shooting), 100% (playback)

Image processing
- White balance: Yes

General
- Video recording: 4K at 30, 25 fps, 1080p at 60, 50, 30, and 25 fps, 480p at 120 and 100 fps, superlapse
- LCD screen: 3.2 inches, 921,000 dots, vari-angle TFT LCD
- Battery: Rechargeable Li-ion Battery EN-EL20a
- AV port(s): HDMI micro connector (Type D), audio out
- Data port(s): Digital I/O (USB Type-C, USB 2.0), WiFi (IEEE 802.11b/g), Bluetooth 5.2
- Body features: No built-in GPS
- Dimensions: 146.3 × 118.8 × 181.3 mm (5.8 × 4.7 × 7.2 inches)
- Weight: 49.9 oz (1,410 g) , including battery and memory card

The Nikon Coolpix P1100 is a superzoom digital bridge camera produced by Nikon, officially announced on February 5, 2025 as the successor to the Nikon Coolpix P1000. The P1100 features a 125× optical zoom NIKKOR lens, covering a focal range equivalent to 24–3000 mm in 35 mm equivalent, and is equipped with a 16 MP back-illuminated CMOS sensor.

The camera uses a NIKKOR lens with 17 elements in 12 groups, including one Super ED and five ED lens elements. The camera supports 4K UHD video recording and features a vari-angle 3.2-inch LCD screen, as well as a 2.36M-dot OLED electronic viewfinder. The lens offers a maximum aperture of f/2.8 at the wide end and f/8. The camera includes a dual-detect optical VR (Vibration Reduction) system.

As the successor to the Nikon –Coolpix P1000, the P1100 keeps the same sensor and lens but replaces the micro-USB port with a USB-C connector. It adds Bluetooth 5.2, improved Wi-Fi security (WPA3-SAE), a selectable AF-area mode in Bird-watching mode, a Fireworks Show scene mode, long exposure noise reduction, and the ability to assign Fn button functions to the optional ML-L7 Bluetooth remote.

Comparison: Nikon Coolpix P1100 vs Nikon Coolpix P1000
Feature	Nikon Coolpix P1100	Nikon Coolpix P1000
USB Port	USB-C	Micro-USB
Bluetooth	5.2	5.0
Wi-Fi Security	WPA3-SAE, WPA2-PSK	WPA2-PSK
Number of Scene Modes	21 (including Fireworks Show, Lighten, and Long Exposure NR)	19 (or more, depending on firmware; no Fireworks Show or Lighten)
AF-area Mode in Bird-watching Mode	Selectable (Center spot, normal, wide)	Fixed
Fireworks Show Scene Mode	Yes	No
Long Exposure NR	Yes	No
Fn Button Assignment to ML-L7 Remote	Yes	No
IP Streaming	No	Yes
Weight (with battery and card)	1410 g (49.74 oz)	1415 g (49.9 oz)

== See also ==
- List of bridge cameras
- Nikon Coolpix P1000
