= Nikon Coolpix P900 =

Nikon point-and-shoot camera

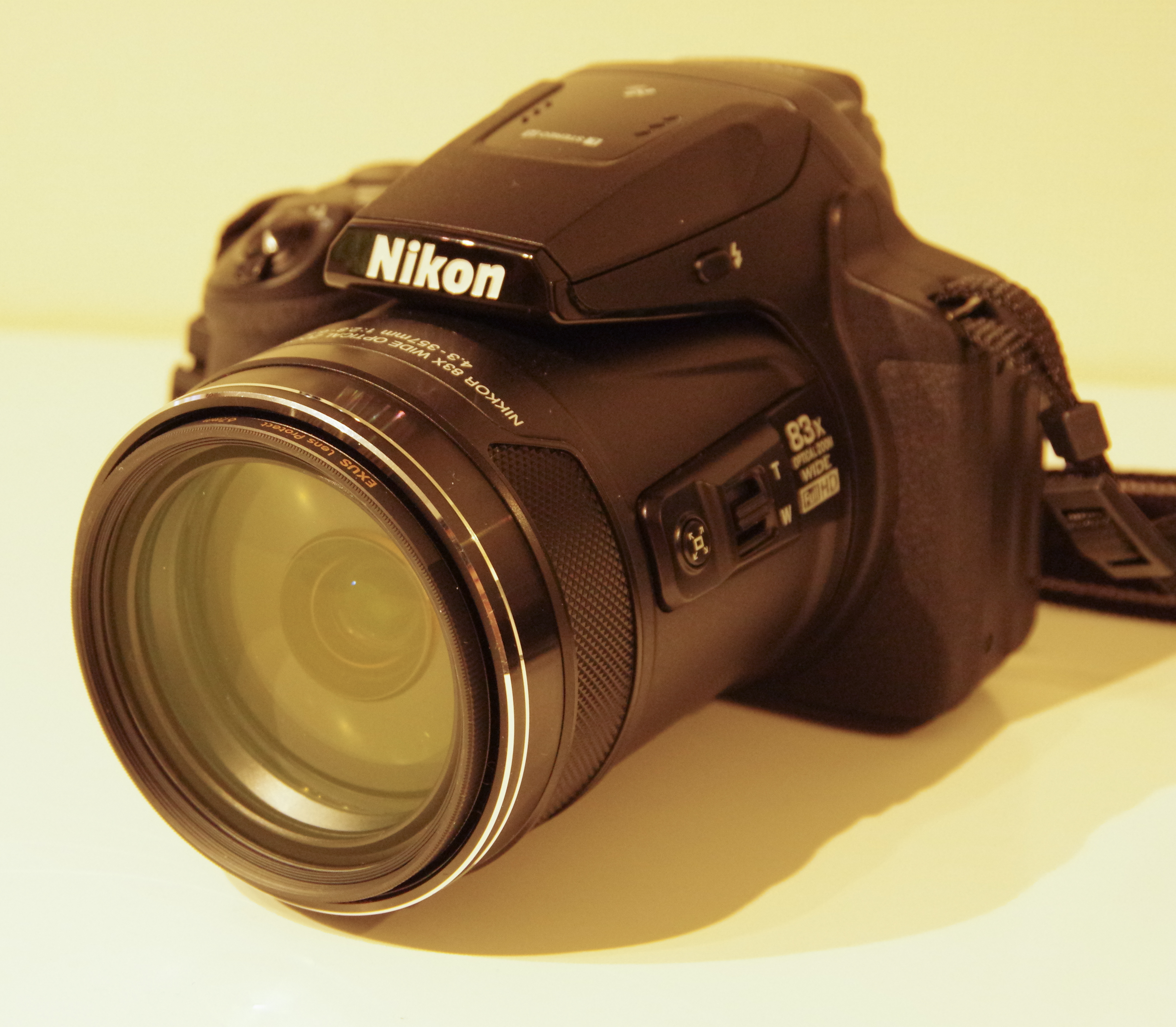

Overview
- Maker: Nikon
- Released: March 2, 2015
- Intro price: $600

Lens
- Lens: 4.3-357 mm (24-2000 mm f/15.8-36.7 equivalent)
- F-numbers: f/2.8-f/6.5 at the widest

Sensor/medium
- Sensor type: CMOS
- Sensor size: 6.17 × 4.55 mm (1/2.3 inch type)
- Maximum resolution: 4608 × 3456 (16 megapixels)
- Recording medium: SD, SDHC or SDXC memory card

Shutter
- Shutter speeds: 1/4000 s to 15 s
- Continuous shooting: 7 frames per second

Viewfinder
- Frame coverage: 100%

Image processing
- Image processor: Expeed C2
- White balance: Yes

General
- Video recording: 1080p at 60, 50, 30, and 25 fps; VGA at 120 fps
- LCD screen: 3 inches with 921 000 dots
- Dimensions: 140 × 103 × 137 mm (5.51 × 4.06 × 5.39 inches)
- Weight: 899 g (32 oz) including battery

The Nikon Coolpix P900 is a superzoom digital bridge camera announced by Nikon on March 2, 2015. With 83× zoom limit and a maximum 2000 mm 35 mm equivalent focal length, it was the greatest-zooming bridge camera at the time of its announcement, a record it held for almost two years, until the release of Kodak's Pixpro Astro Zoom AZ901 in early 2017 with its 90× zoom ratio. The record was later overtaken by the P900's successor, the Nikon P1000 on September 6, 2018, a record it still holds as of September 2020. The P900 complemented its shorter-zooming sister model, the Nikon Coolpix P610, which was announced a few weeks earlier. Later released is the Nikon Coolpix P950, which is nearly identical to the P900, adding several improvements, the most notable being a flash hotshoe, 4K video and RAW shooting.

== See also ==
- List of bridge cameras
