= Panasonic Lumix DMC-FZ300 =

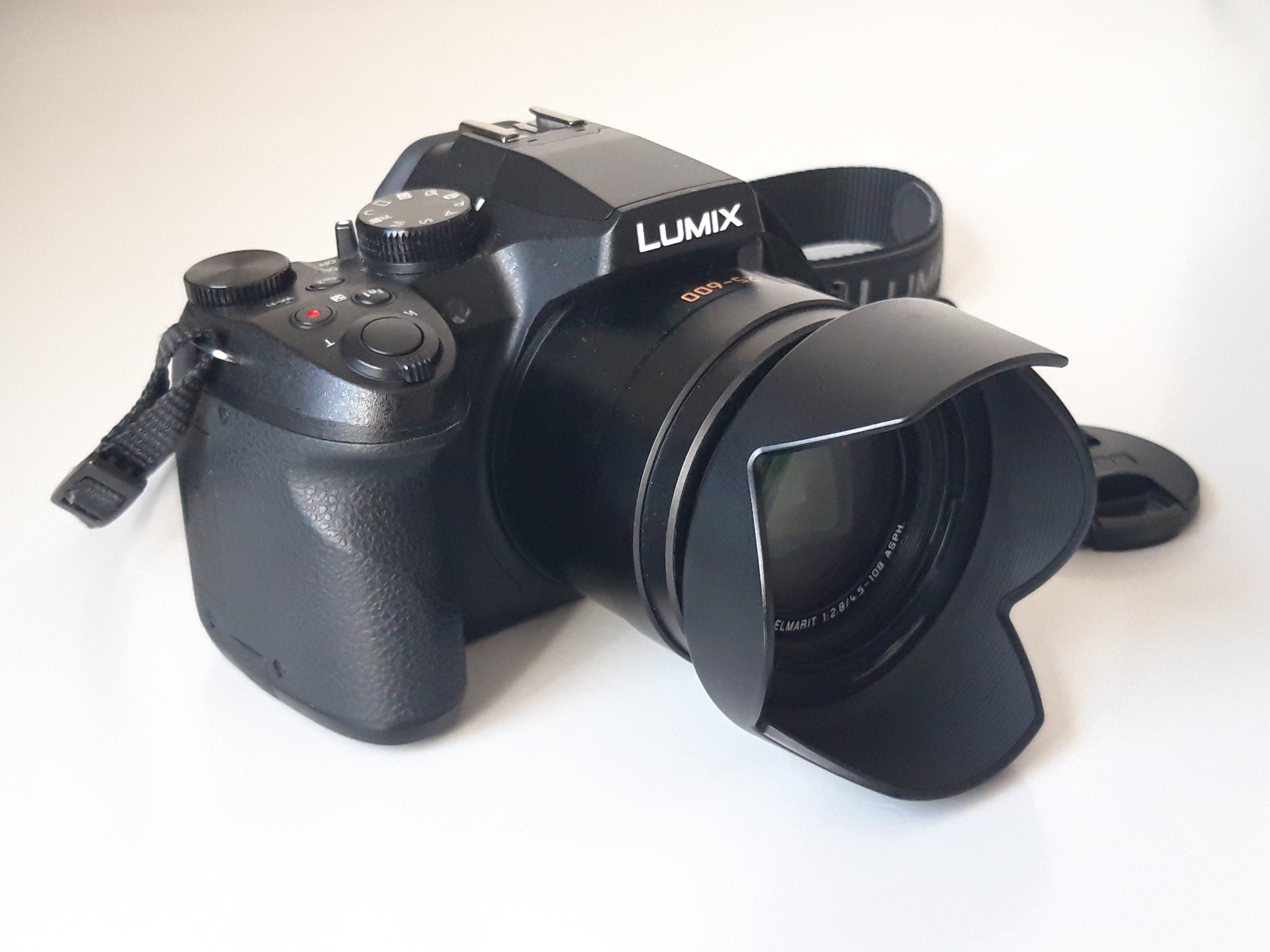

Overview
- Maker: Panasonic

Lens
- Lens: 25-600mm equivalent
- F-numbers: f/2.8 at all zoom levels

Sensor/medium
- Sensor type: BSI-CMOS
- Sensor size: 6.17 x 4.55mm (1/2.3 inch type)
- Maximum resolution: 4000 x 3000 (12 megapixels)
- Film speed: 100-6400
- Recording medium: SD, SDHC or SDXC memory card

Shutter
- Shutter speeds: 1/16000s to 60s
- Continuous shooting: 12 frames per second

Viewfinder
- Viewfinder magnification: 0.7
- Frame coverage: 100%

Image processing
- Image processor: Venus Engine
- White balance: Yes

General
- LCD screen: 3 inches with 1,040,000 dots
- Dimensions: 132 x 92 x 117mm (5.2 x 3.62 x 4.61 inches)
- Weight: 691 g (24 oz) including battery and memory card

The Panasonic Lumix DMC-FZ300 (also known as the Panasonic Lumix DMC-FZ330) is a constant-aperture DSLR-styled digital bridge camera announced by Panasonic on July 16, 2015. It succeeds the Panasonic Lumix DMC-FZ200.

== Panasonic Lumix DMC-FZ330 with opticals components and other filters ==
=== Close-up Raynox ===
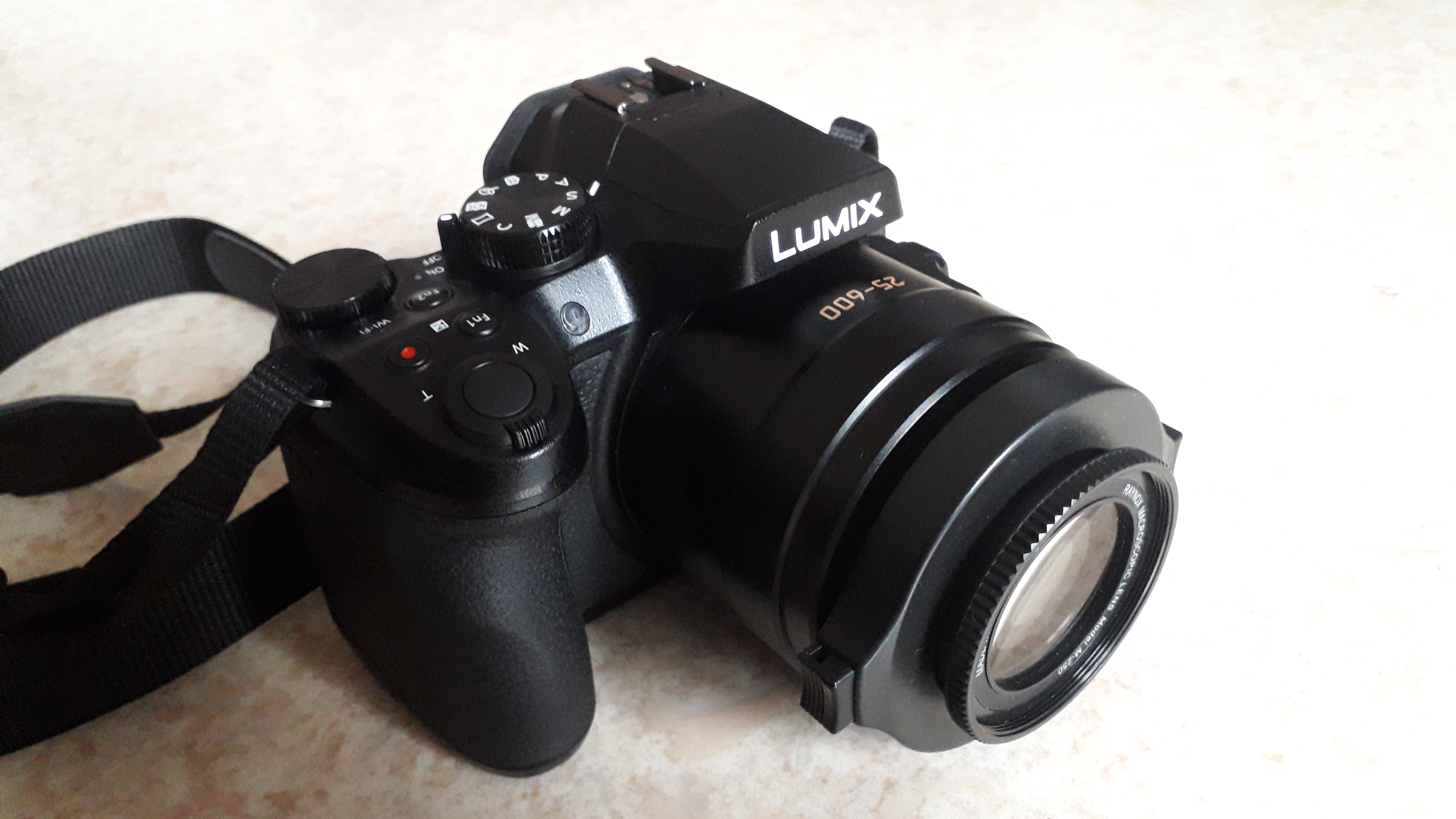
Raynox DCR-250.

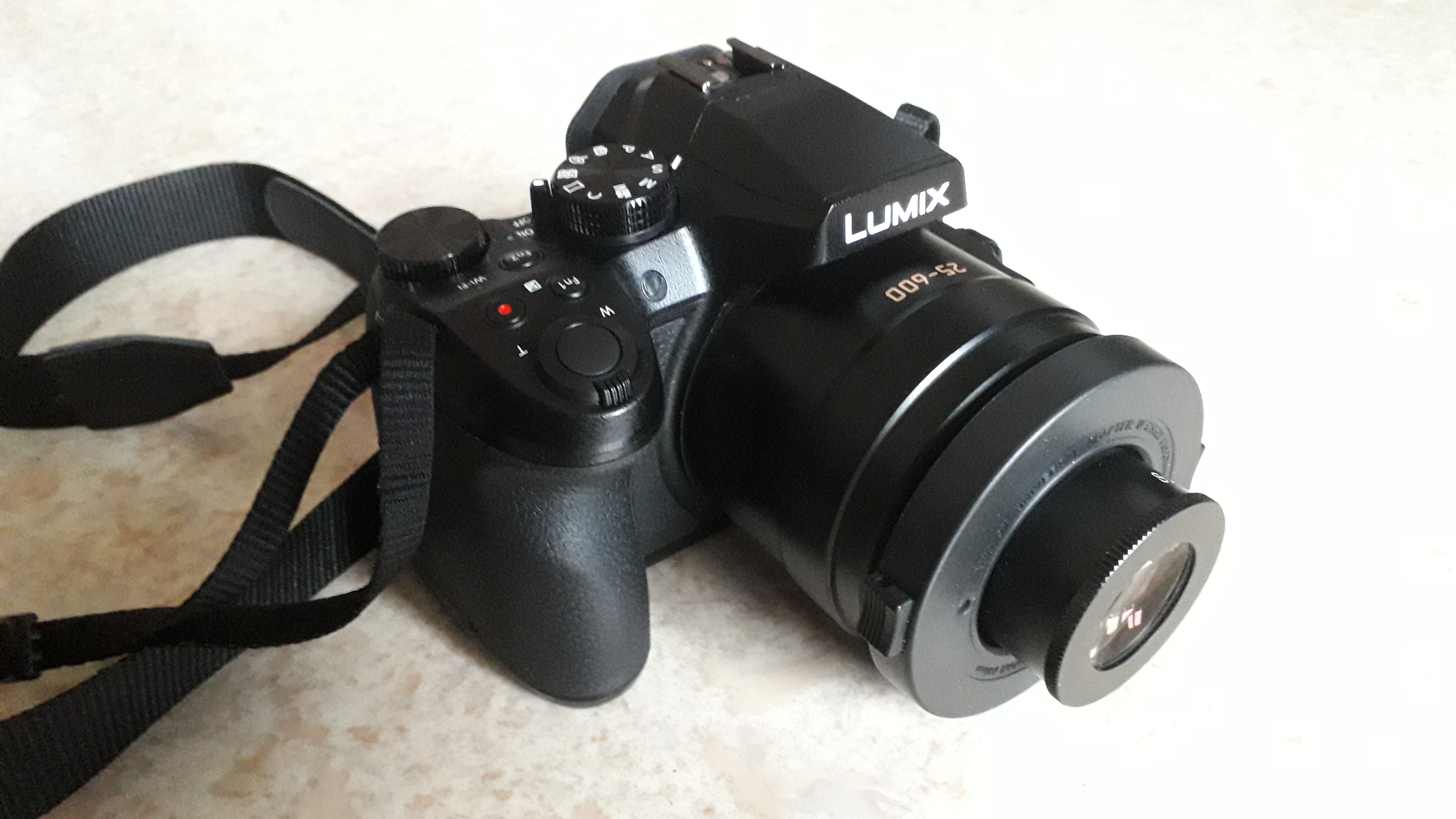
Raynox MSN-505.

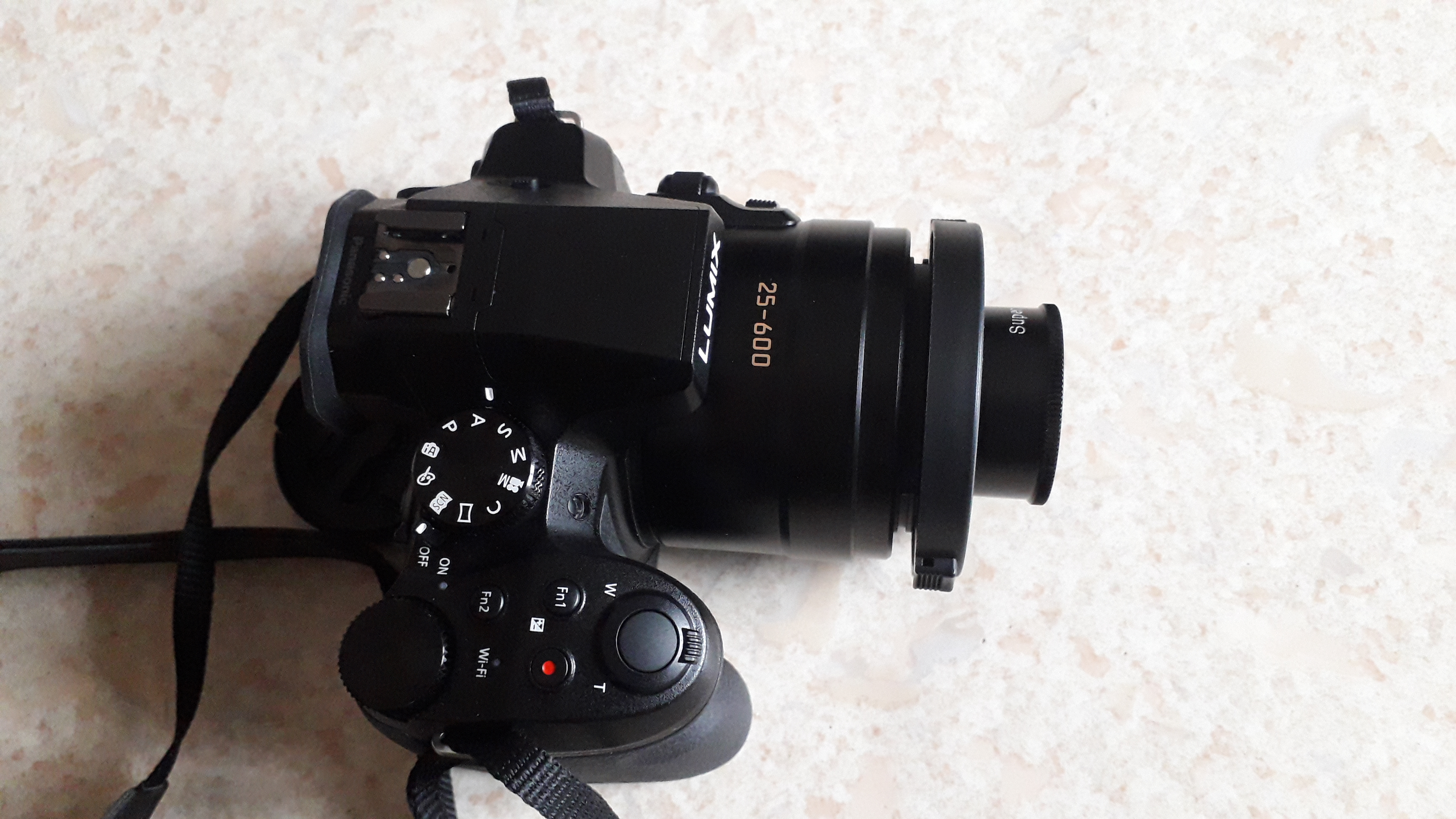
Raynox MSN-505.

=== Hoya CPL ===
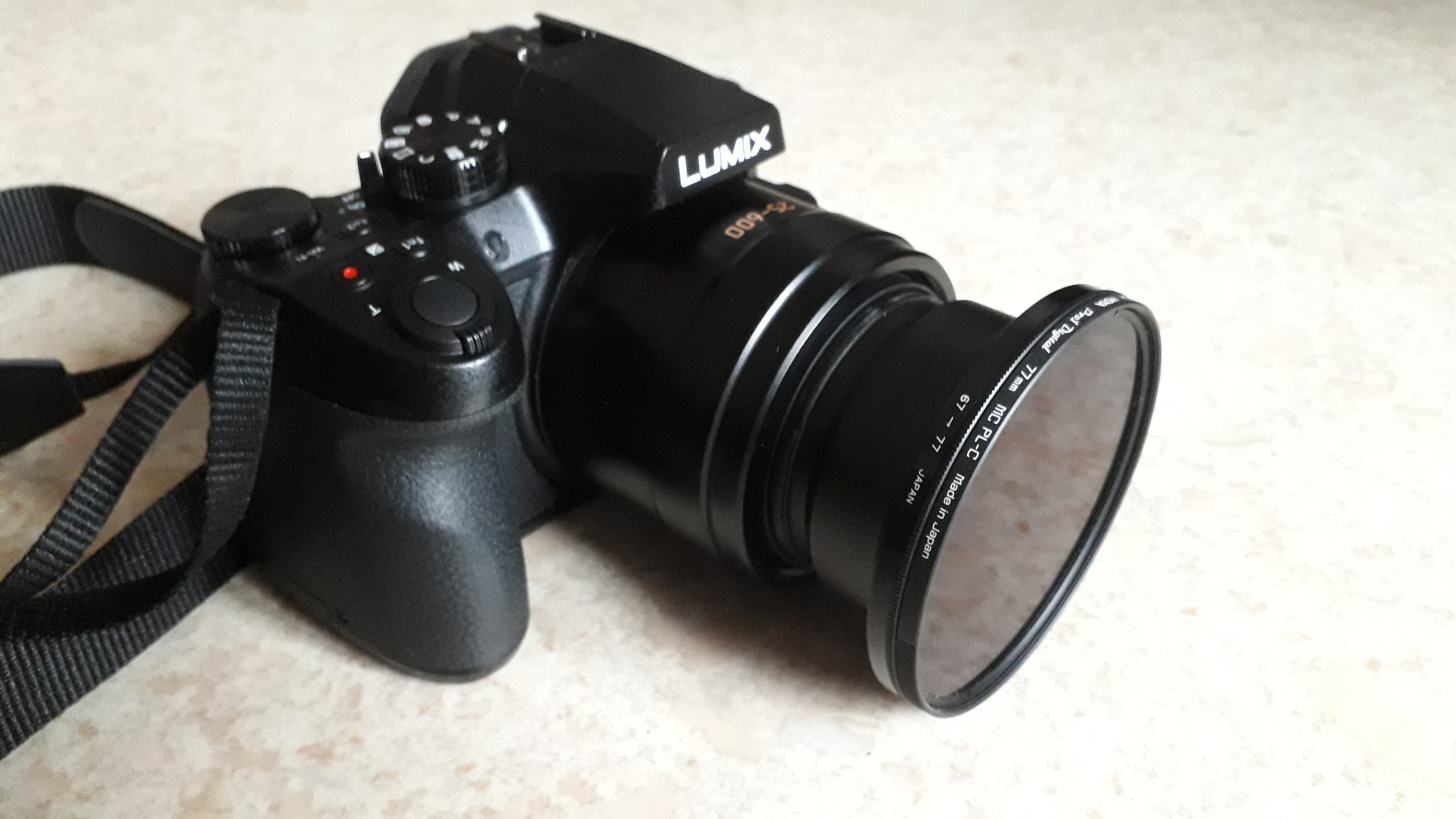
Hoya PRO1 Digital Circular Polarisation filter.

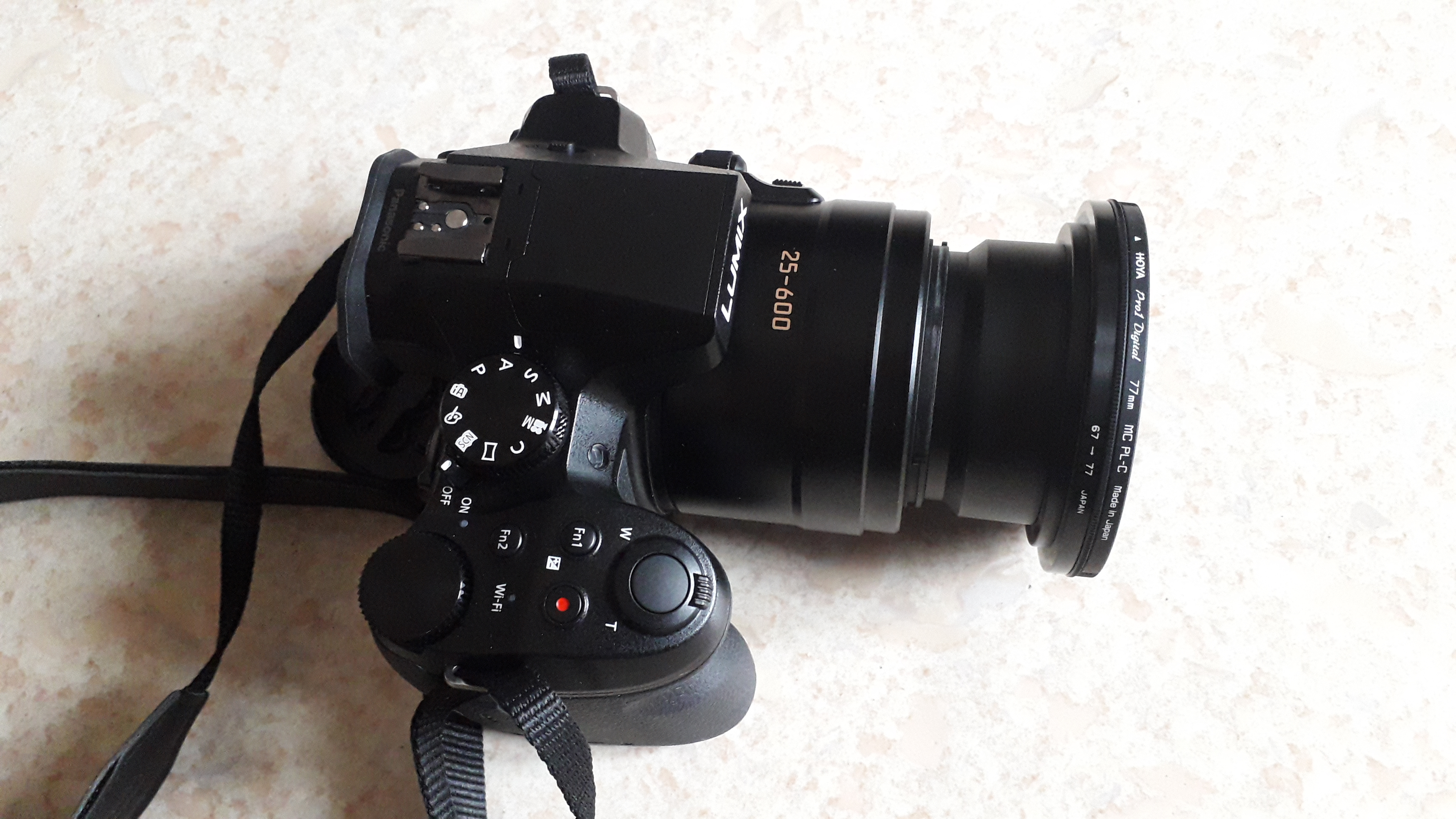
Hoya PRO1 Digital Circular Polarisation filter.

=== Hoya ND filters ===
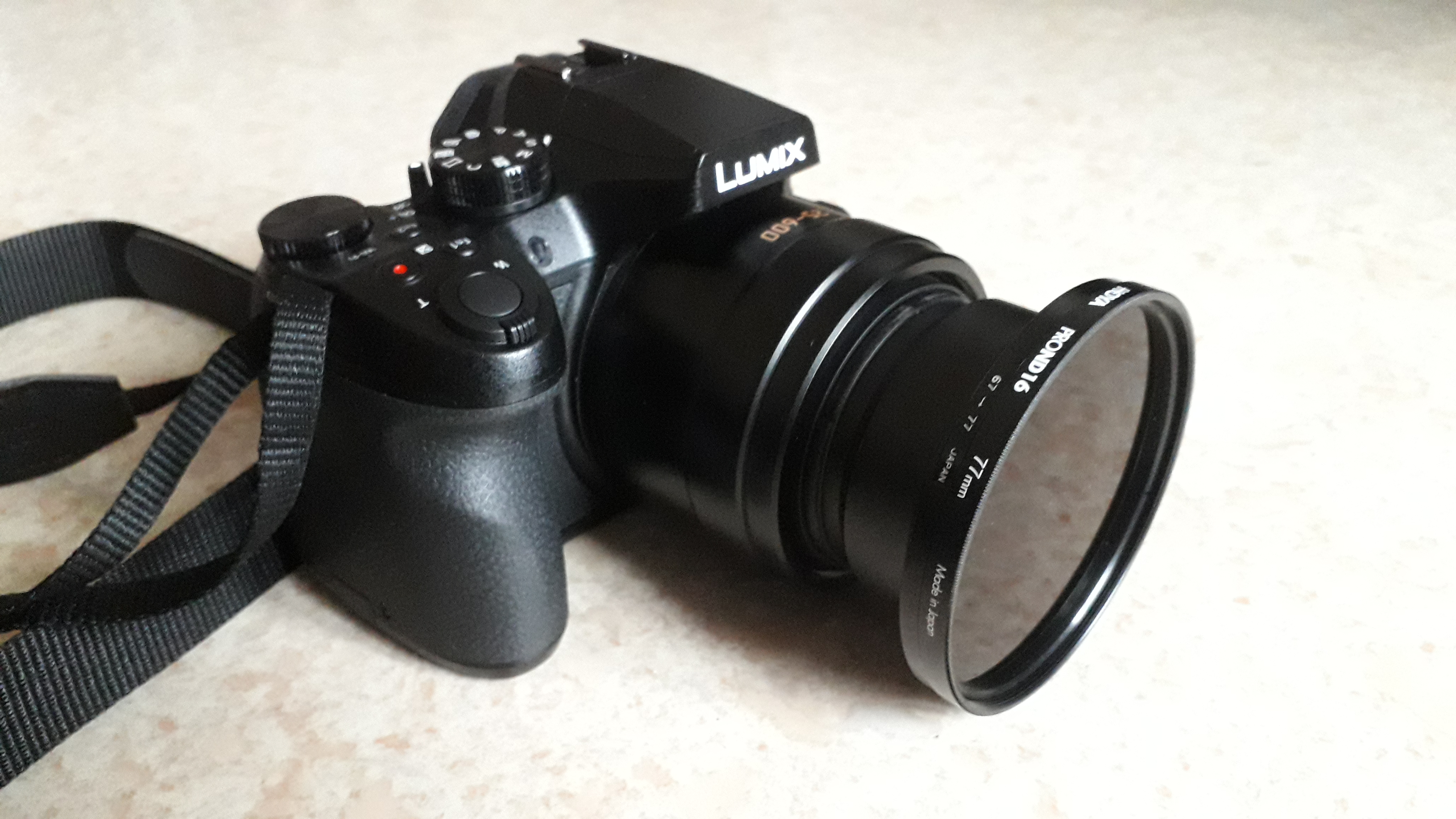
Hoya ND16.

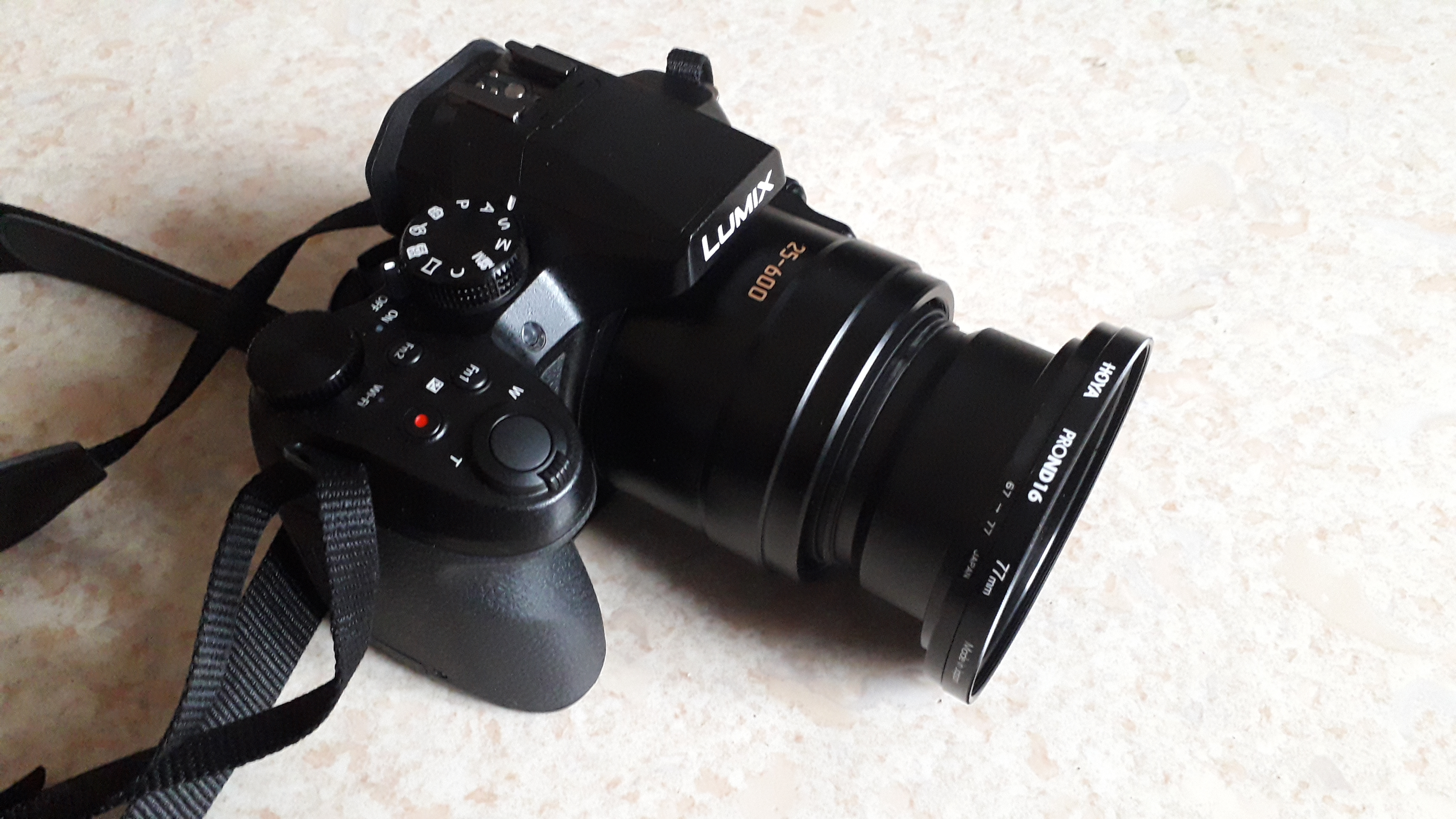
Hoya ND16.

== See also ==
- List of bridge cameras
