= Panasonic Lumix DMC-FZ1000 =

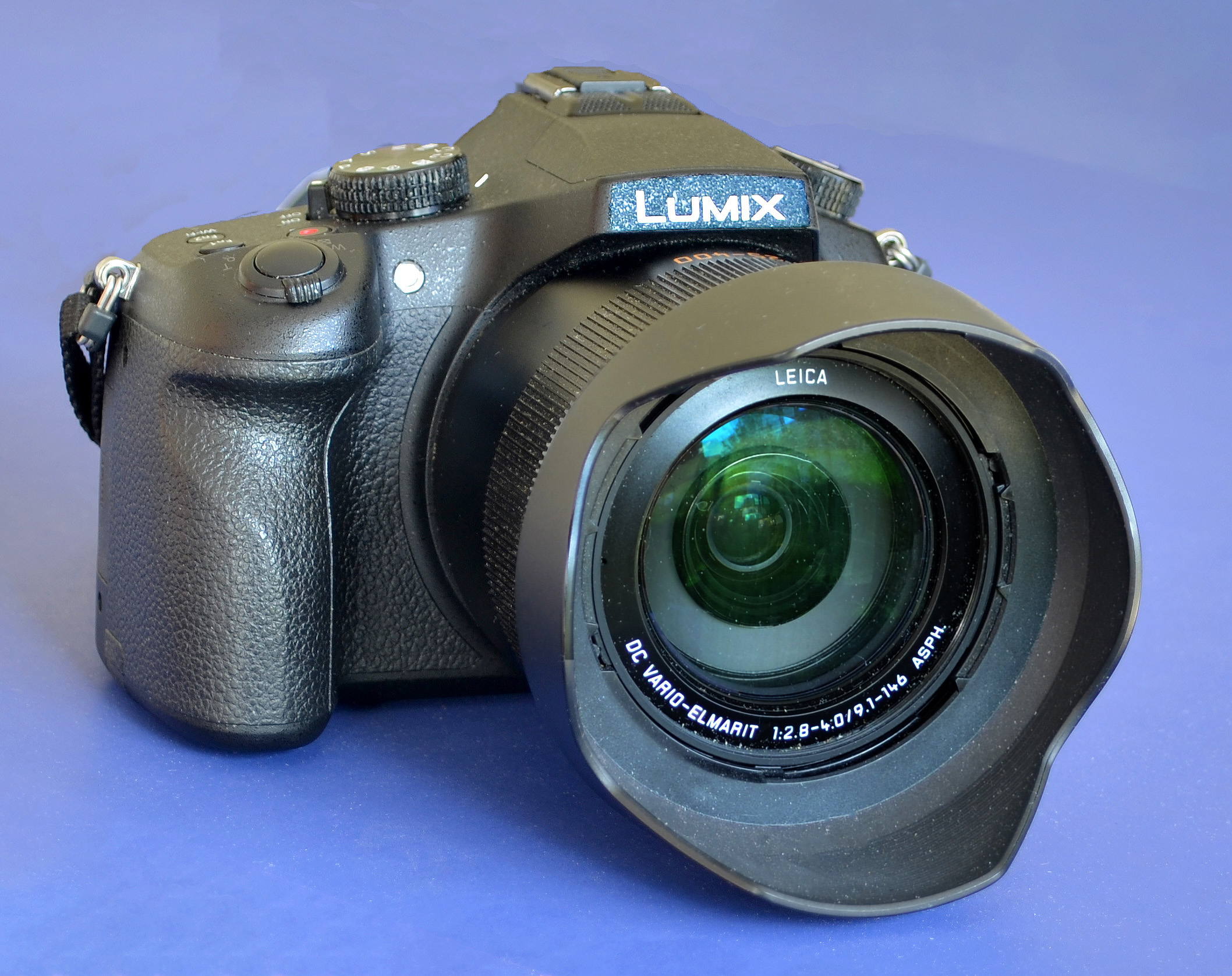

Overview
- Maker: Panasonic
- Type: Digital superzoom bridge
- Released: June 12, 2014; 12 years ago

Lens
- Lens: Leica DC Vario Elmarit f/2.8 – 4.0 9.1–146 mm Asph. (25 – 400 mm equivalent)
- F-numbers: f/2.8-4.0 at the widest (f/7.6-10.8 equivalent)

Sensor/medium
- Sensor type: BSI-CMOS
- Sensor size: 13.2 × 8.8 mm (1 inch type, 2.7x crop factor)
- Maximum resolution: 5472 × 3648 (20.1 megapixels, 3:2)
- Film speed: 125-12800, expandable to 80-25600
- Recording medium: SD/SDXC/SDHC cards
- Storage media: SD card

Flash
- Flash: Very Bright, up to 10 metres

Shutter
- Frame rate: 120 fps at 1080p (without sound)] and 25 (PAL variant) or 30 fps (NTSC variant) at 2160p 4K
- Shutter speed range: minimum: 1/16 000 s (electronic), 1/8000 s (mechanical) maximum: 60 s
- Continuous shooting: 12 fps at full resolution and 50fps at 5 MP

Viewfinder
- Viewfinder: Electronic, OLED, 2.359.000 dots
- Optional viewfinders: No

Image processing
- Image processor: Venus Engine

General
- Video recording: 4K (100 Mbps) (MP4); AVCHD, MP4, slow-motion video at 1080p at 100 FPS
- LCD screen: 3 inch display, 921 000 dots, articulated
- Optional battery packs: Original: DMW-BW7
- Dimensions: 137 × 99 × 131 mm (5.39 × 3.9 × 5.16 inches)
- Weight: 831 g (29 oz) with battery

The Panasonic Lumix DMC-FZ1000 is a digital superzoom bridge camera by Panasonic. It went on sale in June 2014. It has a 20 megapixel 3:2 BSI-CMOS sensor and Leica-branded 25–400 mm equivalent focal length lens with a maximum aperture of f/2.8 to f/4 (f/4 at about 170 mm and higher). It has a 1-inch CMOS sensor and supports ISO film speeds from 80 to 25600, shutter speeds from 1/16000 s (electronic shutter) to 60 s and RAW capture, while the lowest physical shutter speed is 1/4000 s. The unit is equipped with five "Fn" function buttons which can be allocated to custom shortcuts.

It is considered the world's first bridge camera that can record in 4K (2160p) video resolution, compared to other compact cameras as of 2014 filming at full HD (1080p) resolution. What sets it apart the most is the introduction of 4K Ultra HD video with a price lower than $900. The frame rate at that resolution is 25p on units sold in PAL regions and 30p in NTSC regions, and can not be changed. 8 megapixel still photographs in the JPEG format can be extracted from any video frame from 4K videos in playback mode. However, the 4K (2160p) video resolution is only accessible in the manual camera mode, is not optically stabilized, and the field of view is restricted because only a cropped area of 3840 by 2160 pixels is read out from the image sensor instead of downsampled from a wider area of the image sensor.

Along with its main competitor, the 2013 Sony Cyber-shot DSC-RX10, it is part of a new class of superzoom cameras that use larger sensors, better displays and electronic viewfinders. They easily provide much narrower depth of field when desired, compared to previous more compact superzoom/ultrazoom cameras. Out of the two, the FZ1000 has a much larger zoom range (16×); the exact video mode and whether OIS is used determines the crop factor, here expressed as 35 mm equivalent focal length for the inbuilt lens:

While the RX10 has a macro focus spot of 5 cm, the FZ1000 is able to record clear-focused photos and videos. The optical zoom is also usable while recording videos in any video recording mode, including the highest resolution with 3840 × 2160 pixels. It is possible to record HDR photos, but not HDR videoclips.

In their review of the FZ1000, DPReview wrote "the FZ1000 has an advantage over ILCs, as any lens you add to one of those cameras will be larger, heavier and pricier" and gave it a Gold Award. While cameras.reviewed.com wrote "it is better than 100% of the point & shoot cameras we have tested under $900".

== Leica V-Lux (Typ 114) ==
The Leica V-Lux (Typ 114) is based on and nearly identical to the FZ1000 with differences only in exterior design elements, warranty, bundled software, and price. (The unrelated but similarly named Leica V-Lux 1 is based on the Panasonic FZ50.)

== Panasonic Lumix DC-FZ1000 II ==
The Lumix DMC-FZ1000 was first succeeded by the Lumix DMC-FZ2500 in November 2016. Afterwards, Panasonic also released the Lumix DC-FZ1000 II in March 2019. The original Lumix DMC-FZ1000 was discontinued in the spring of 2021.

== Leica V-Lux 5 ==
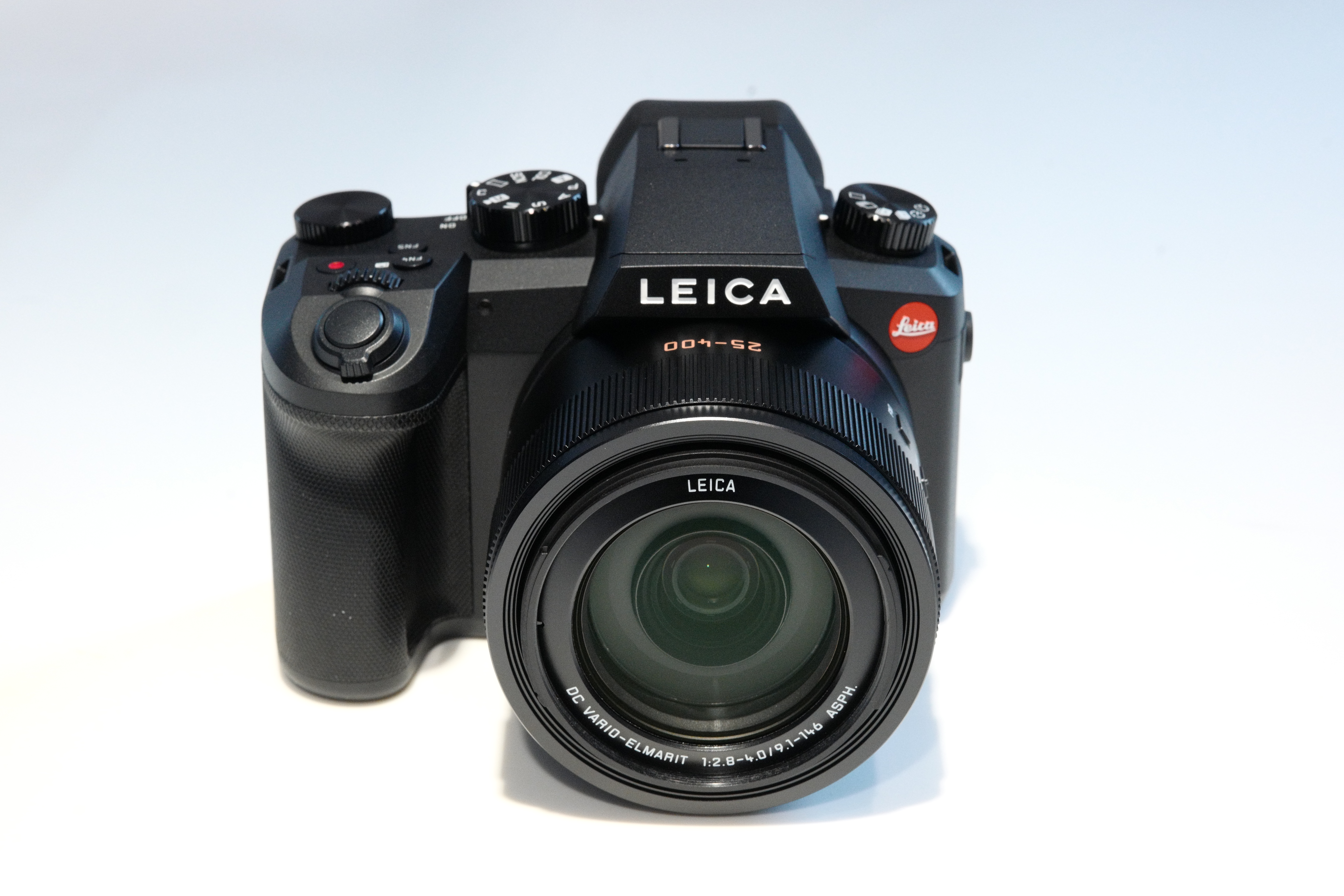
Leica V-Lux 5

The Leica V-Lux 5 is based on and nearly identical to the FZ1000 II with differences only in exterior design elements, warranty, bundled software, and price.

== Focal Length ==
- 25 – 400 mm in 35 mm equiv. in 3:2 for stills (Full Sensor and Full Zooming Range)
- 26 – 416 mm in 35 mm equiv. in 16:9 for stills
- 26 – 416 mm in 35 mm equiv. in 16:9 video recording, O.I.S. Off
- 28 – 448 mm in 35 mm equiv. in 16:9 video recording, O.I.S. On
- 37 – 592 mm in 35 mm equiv. in 4K video recording (using the center of the sensor with 3840 × 2160 pixels.)

== Optical image stabilization ==
The FZ1000 is equipped with a 5-axis optical image stabilization. However, it is deactivated while recording in the highest available resolution, 2160p 4K.

== Burst Shot ==
The FZ1000's burstshot mode can record up to 12 JPEG pictures per second with full resolution at highest selected burst speed. There are four different burst speeds to choose from. The second-highest speed can capture photos continuously, but if the burst memory is full and the memory card cannot keep up, it will slow down automatically.

== High-speed video ==
Prior to official release, the Lumix FZ1000 was originally announced as being able to record slow-motion in the following resolutions and framerates:

- Full HD 1920×1080: 100 or 120 fps
- HD 720p 1280×720: 200 or 240 fps
- 640×360: 300 or 360 fps

But the firmware currently only allows to record FullHD at 120 fps.

Another caveat to be aware of is that the device records slow motion (“high speed”) videos using the menial method, i.e. the output of Slow-Motion recording is not saved as being the original duration but is instead "stretched": for example, a one-second recording at 120 fps will be saved as being 4 seconds at 30 fps. While this is easily corrected for the video track without the need for reencoding, one consequence is that audio is not recorded.

== Zoom Levels ==
- 25 mm – f/2.8
- 200 mm – f/4.0
- 400 mm – f/4.0

The FZ1000 also has a feature for Lossless Digital Zooming, which is interpreted as iƵoom, and will be used, if the highest image resolution is not selected. This is also available for Videos up to FullHD-Resolution.

== Light sensitivity ==
According to test images from a Polish review, the level of detail remains high until ISO 6400 and acceptable at ISO 12800. The level of detail plunges at peak ISO 25600.

== See also ==
- List of large sensor fixed-lens cameras
- List of bridge cameras
