= Tamron AF 18-270mm F/3.5-6.3 Di II VC LD Aspherical (IF) MACRO =

- Maker: Tamron
- Lens mount(s): Canon EF-S, Nikon F

Technical data
- Type: Zoom
- Focus drive: Micromotor
- Focal length: 18-270mm
- Focal length (35mm equiv.): 27-410mm (Nikon), 29-437mm (Canon)
- Aperture (max/min): f/3.6 - f/6.3
- Close focus distance: 0.49 metres (1.6 ft)
- Max. magnification: 0.29
- Diaphragm blades: 7
- Construction: 18 elements in 13 groups

Features
- Weather-sealing: No No
- Lens-based stabilization: Yes Yes
- Aperture ring: No No
- Application: Travel zoom

Physical
- Diameter: 80 millimetres (3.1 in)
- Weight: 560 grams (1.23 lb)
- Filter diameter: 72mm

Accessories
- Lens hood: AB0003

History
- Introduction: 2008
- Discontinuation: 2010
- Successor: Tamron 18-270mm F/3.5-6.3 Di II VC PZD

The Tamron AF 18-270mm F/3.5-6.3 Di II VC LD Aspherical (IF) MACRO is an interchangeable superzoom camera lens for Canon EF-S and Nikon F APS-C bodies, announced by Tamron on July 30, 2008. Less than two years later, it was succeeded by the more compact Tamron 18-270mm F/3.5-6.3 Di II VC PZD.

A review by photozone noted the lens' high lateral chromatic aberration and low edge sharpness, while suggesting that distortion was typical the genre and vignetting relatively modest, while autofocus was "good" and optical stabilisation competitive. The latter was evaluated by DPReview as "at least 3 stops benefit" (sic), adding that while the lens was resistant to flare, changing aperture also shifted focus, making macro shooting difficult.
