= Olympus Stylus 1 =

Overview
- Maker: Olympus Corporation
- Released: 2013-11-25

Lens
- Lens mount: fixed lens
- Lens: i.Zuiko 6-64.3mm 1:2.8 (28–300mm equivalent)
- F-numbers: Constant f/2.8 at its widest

Sensor/medium
- Sensor type: BSI-CMOS
- Sensor size: 7.44 x 5.58 mm (1/1.7" type)
- Maximum resolution: 12 Megapixel
- Film format: RAW and JPEG
- Film size: 4/3, (1x1,3x2,16x9), maximum 3968x2976 pixels
- Film speed: ISO Auto and 100-12800
- Recording medium: SD/SDHC/SDXC card

Focusing
- Focus: Contrast Detection AF
- Focus modes: S-AF, C-AF, Touch AF(on screen), Tracking AF, Face Detection AF
- Focus areas: 25

Exposure/metering
- Exposure bracketing: Yes
- Exposure modes: P,S,A,M
- Metering modes: Multi-Segment Metering, Spot Metering, Center Weighted Metering

Flash
- Flash synchronization: 1/2000s

Shutter
- Continuous shooting: 7 frames per second

Viewfinder
- Viewfinder: Electronic, 1,440,000 dots
- Viewfinder magnification: 1.15x
- Frame coverage: 100%

General
- Video recording: 1920x1080 240 fps
- LCD screen: 3 inch tilting, 1,040,000 dots
- Dimensions: 116 x 87 x 57mm (4.57 x 3.43 x 2.24 inches)
- Weight: 402 g (14 oz) including batteries

The Olympus Stylus 1 is a constant-aperture digital superzoom bridge camera by Olympus Corporation. A slightly updated model called the Olympus Stylus 1s was later released.

== See also ==
- List of bridge cameras
