= Nikon Coolpix P1000 =

Digital bridge camera

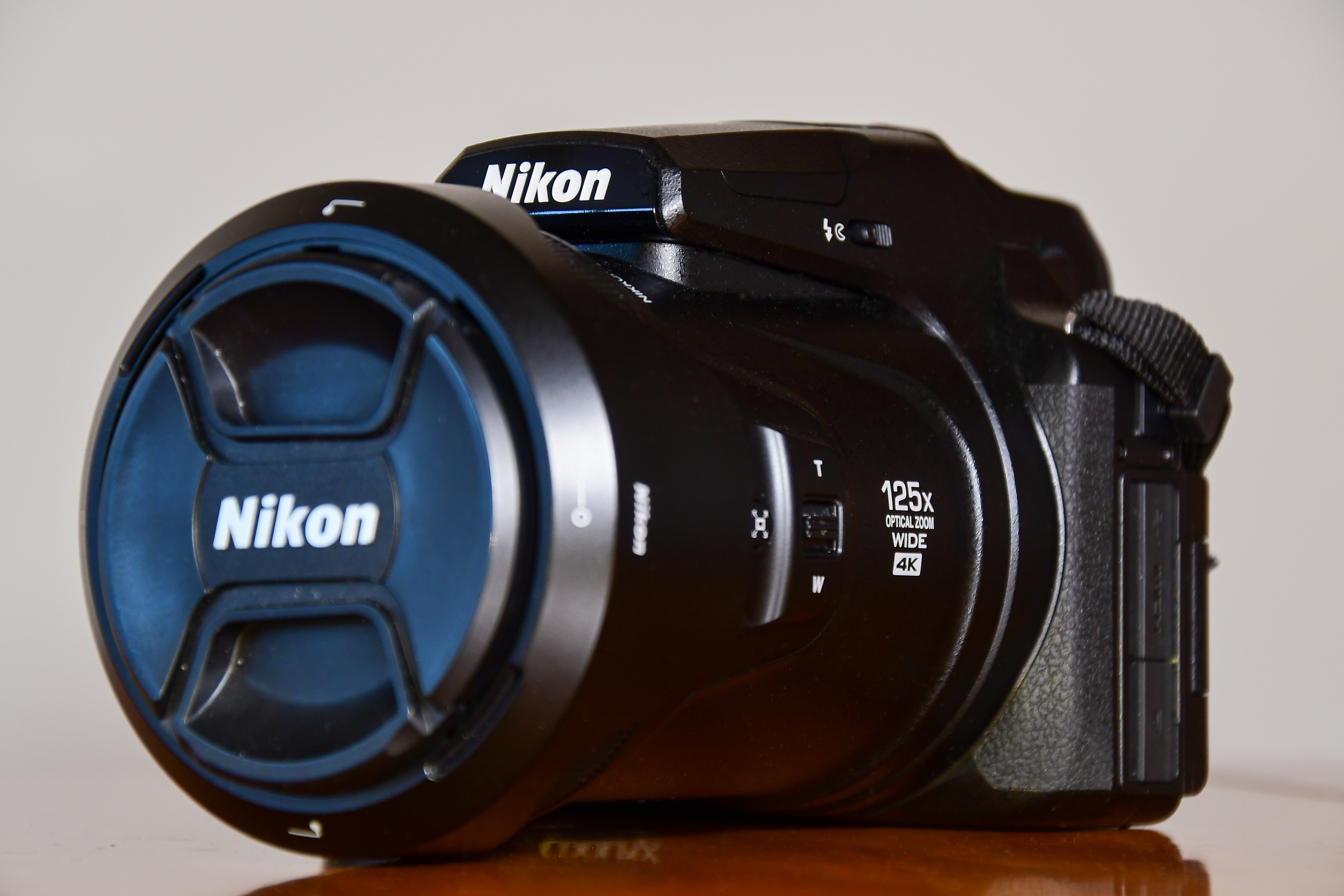

Overview
- Maker: Nikon
- Type: Bridge camera
- Released: September 6, 2018
- Intro price: US$999.95

Lens
- Lens: 4.3–539 mm (24–3000 mm in 35 mm equivalent)
- F-numbers: f/2.8–8.0 at the widest

Sensor/medium
- Sensor type: CMOS
- Sensor size: 6.17 × 4.55 mm (1/2.3 inch type)
- Maximum resolution: 4608 × 3456 (16 megapixels)
- Recording medium: SD, SDHC or SDXC memory card

Exposure/metering
- Exposure modes: Auto, Scene, Scene Auto Selector, Smart Portrait, Special Effects
- Metering modes: Matrix, center-weighted, spot

Flash
- Flash: Yes
- Flash exposure compensation: Yes

Shutter
- Shutter speeds: 1/4000 s to 30 s
- Continuous shooting: 7 fps

Viewfinder
- Viewfinder: Electronic viewfinder, 1 cm (0.39 in) approx. 2359k-dot equivalent OLED with the diopter adjustment function (-3 to +3 m-1)
- Frame coverage: 100%

Image processing
- White balance: Yes

General
- Video recording: 4K at 30, 25 fps, 1080p at 60, 50, 30, and 25 fps
- LCD screen: 3.2 inches with 921 000 dots
- Battery: Rechargeable Li-ion Battery EN-EL20a
- AV port(s): HDMI micro connector (Type D), audio out
- Data port(s): Digital I/O (USB), WiFi, Bluetooth 4.1
- Dimensions: 146.3 × 118.8 × 181.3 mm (5.8 × 4.7 × 7.2 inches)
- Weight: 49.9 oz (1,410 g), including battery and memory card

The Nikon Coolpix P1000 is a superzoom digital bridge camera produced by Nikon, released on September 6, 2018. It has a 125× optical zoom, its focal range going from 24 mm to 3000 mm 35 mm equivalent focal length. As of September 2023, it is the greatest-zooming bridge camera available, surpassing its predecessor, the Nikon Coolpix P900.

On February 4, 2025, Nikon officially announced its replacement by the new Nikon Coolpix P1100. Nikon ended production of the P1000 the following month.

== See also ==
- List of bridge cameras
