= P1000 =

P1000 may refer to:

- Landkreuzer P. 1000 Ratte, a design for a super-heavy tank for use by Nazi Germany during World War II
- P-1000 Vulkan, an anti-ship cruise missile of the Soviet Union
- Samsung P1000 Galaxy Tab, a mini-tablet computer
- Nikon Coolpix P1000, a camera
