= Canon PowerShot SX520 HS =

Overview
- Maker: Canon
- Type: Point-and-shoot
- Intro price: $330, usually $200

Lens
- Lens: 24-1008mm equivalent
- F-numbers: f/3.4-f/6.0 at the widest

Sensor/medium
- Sensor type: BSI-CMOS
- Sensor size: 6.17 x 4.55mm (1/2.3 inch type)
- Maximum resolution: 4608 x 3456 (16 megapixels)
- Film speed: 100 to 3200
- Recording medium: SD, SDHC or SDXC memory card
- Storage media: SD card

Focusing
- Focus areas: 9 focus points

Flash
- Flash: Built-in flash

Shutter
- Shutter speeds: 1/2000s to 15s
- Continuous shooting: 1.6 frames per second

Image processing
- Image processor: Digic 4+
- White balance: Yes

General
- Video recording: Full-HD 1080p
- LCD screen: 3 inches with 461,000 dots
- Battery: NB-6L
- AV port(s): NTSC/PAL HDMI
- Data port(s): USB-mini
- Dimensions: 120 x 82 x 92mm (4.72 x 3.23 x 3.62 inches)
- Weight: 441 g (16 oz) including battery

The Canon PowerShot SX520 HS is a digital compact camera announced by Canon Inc. on July 29, 2014. The point-and-shoot superzoom camera has a 16 megapixel sensor, 42x optical zoom, and full 1080p HD video capabilities. It replaced the SX 510 HS from previous year. The zoom was increased from 30x to 42x but unlike SX510 HS it does not support WiFi transfer for images and videos.

This camera is equipped with optical Image Stabilization technology, which reduces camera shake during videos and photo shooting and has a very good stabilizer. This camera records video in up to 1080p Full HD, with stereo sound via the two microphones located on the top of the camera.
