= Nikon AF-S DX Zoom-Nikkor 18-300mm f/3.5-6.3G ED VR =

AF-S DX Nikkor-Zoom 18 - 300mm f/3.5–6.3G ED VR
- Maker: Nikon
- Lens mount: F-mount

Technical data
- Type: Zoom
- Focal length: 18 - 300 mm
- Focal length (35mm equiv.): 27 - 450 mm
- Crop factor: 1.5
- Aperture (max/min): f/3.5–22 (wide) f/6.3–40 (tele)
- Close focus distance: 0.48 m/1.6 ft.
- Max. magnification: 1/16.7
- Diaphragm blades: 7 (rounded)
- Construction: 16 elements in 12 groups

Features
- Short back focus: No No
- Ultrasonic motor: Yes Yes
- Lens-based stabilization: Yes Yes
- Macro capable: No No
- Unique features: 3 Extra-low Dispersion (ED) glass elements 3 Aspherical glass elements Super Integrated Coating; Internal Focusing
- Application: Wide (DX relative); Standard (DX relative); Telephoto superzoom (DX relative)

Physical
- Min. length: 99 mm/3.8 in.
- Diameter: 78.5 mm/3.0 in.
- Weight: 550 g/19.4 oz.
- Filter diameter: 67 mm screw-on

Accessories
- Lens hood: HB-39
- Case: CL-1018

Angle of view
- Diagonal: 76˚ - 5˚20'

History
- Introduction: May 2014.

Retail info
- MSRP: 899.95 (release) USD; 699.95 (current) USD

The 18-300mm f/3.5–6.3G lens (not to be confused with the 18-300mm f/3.5–5.6G lens) is a telephoto superzoom lens manufactured by Nikon for its line of DX DSLR cameras.

As with other DX format lenses, the smaller image circle makes it compatible only with APS-C-sized image sensors. If used on a 35mm film SLR, vignetting will occur; however, the lens can be used on an FX DSLR because the camera can be automatically or manually set "DX Crop Mode", eliminating vignette, but also reducing the image area from an FX-size sensor to a DX-size sensor

The lens is designed to be an all-in-one solution. This lens does not replace the 18-300mm f/3.5–5.6G.

The differences between the lens and the 18-300mm f/3.5–5.6G are as follows:

Lens	18-300mm f/3.5–6.3G	18-300mm f/3.5-5.6G	
Max. F-stop	6.3	5.6	
Length (mm/in.)	99/3.8	120/4.7	
Diameter (mm/in.)	78.5/3.0	83/3.3	
Weight (g/oz.)	550/19.4	830/29.3	
Filter size	67 mm	77 mm	
MSRP	699.95	999.95	msrp-currency= USD

Since it has the same focal length as the f/3.5–5.6G, it shares the record of having the largest zoom range of any other lens (interchangeable camera lenses only) currently manufactured.

== Features ==
The lens has the following features:

Nikon's Silent Wave Motor to drive the autofocus mechanism quickly and almost completely silently (denoted by "AF-S" on the lens body).

Nikon's VR (Vibration Reduction) for image stabilization (denoted by "VR" on the lens body).

Nikon's Extra-low Dispersion (ED) glass elements to remove chromatic aberrations that may occur (denoted by "ED" on the lens body).

Nikon's Internal Focusing (IF) to prevent the lens assembly from changing sizes during focusing so it can remain compact.

Aspherical lens elements to remove other types of aberrations that may occur.

Nikon's Super Integrated Coating on the lens elements to improve color on photographs and reducing ghosting and flaring.

== Specifications ==
Maximum reproduction ratio	0.32x
Rangefinder	Yes (shown in camera viewfinder and display only)
Lens type	G
Format	DX; FX in "DX Crop Mode"
Focus	Automatic; Manual
