= List of bridge cameras =

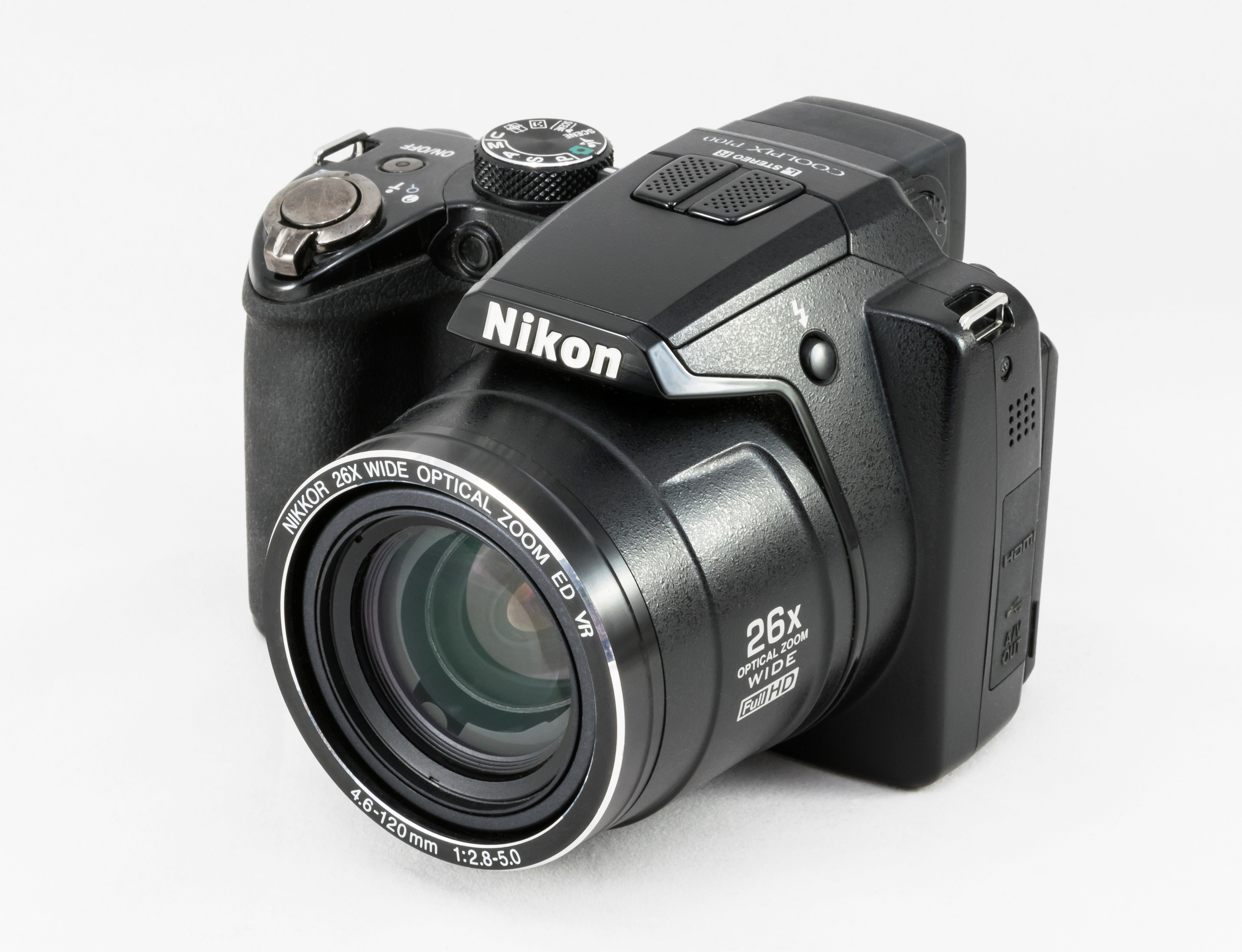
Nikon Coolpix P100

This is a list of bridge cameras, which are loosely defined as fixed-lens digital cameras with DSLR-style bodies and superzoom lenses. Their larger bodies and lenses differentiate them from smaller superzoom compact cameras, also known as travel zoom cameras.

Almost all bridge cameras include an electronic viewfinder (EVF) centered above the lens, with the exception of the Canon G3 X (that offered it as an optional accessory) and some low-end models, such as the Nikon B600.

All current models include a power zoom lens that retracts when not in use and is controlled by a lever on the body like on a point-and-shoot, but a few past models such as the Fujifilm X-S1 and S9000 included a manual zoom lens controlled by a ring on the lens barrel.

== Large sensor bridge cameras with at least 16× zoom ==
Each of the following models contains a 1.0-type ("1-inch") image sensor with a crop factor of 2.7.

Model	Sensor size	Optical zoom	Focal length (Note: 35mm equivalent.)		Aperture		Pixel count	Weight	EVF	Release year	Availability
Model	Sensor size	Optical zoom	Wide	Tele	Wide	Tele	Pixel count	Weight	EVF	Release year	Availability
Sony RX10 V	1.0-type	25×	24mm	600mm	f/2.4	f/4.0	20 MP	1111g	Yes	2026	Current
Sony RX10 IV	1.0-type	25×	24mm	600mm	f/2.4	f/4.0	20 MP	1095g	Yes	2017	Discontinued
Sony RX10 III	1.0-type	25×	24mm	600mm	f/2.4	f/4.0	20 MP	1095g	Yes	2016	Discontinued
Canon G3 X	1.0-type	25×	24mm	600mm	f/2.8	f/5.6	20 MP	733g	Opt. (Note: Optional accessory.)	2015	Discontinued
Panasonic FZ2500 (Note: Known as the FZ2000 outside of North America.)	1.0-type	20×	24mm	480mm	f/2.8	f/4.5	20 MP	966g	Yes	2016	Discontinued
Leica V-Lux 5	1.0-type	16×	25mm	400mm	f/2.8	f/4.0	20 MP	812g	Yes	2019	Discontinued
Panasonic FZ1000 II	1.0-type	16×	25mm	400mm	f/2.8	f/4.0	20 MP	810g	Yes	2019	Discontinued
Leica V-Lux	1.0-type	16×	25mm	400mm	f/2.8	f/4.0	20 MP	830g	Yes	2014	Discontinued
Panasonic FZ1000	1.0-type	16×	25mm	400mm	f/2.8	f/4.0	20 MP	831g	Yes	2014	Discontinued

== Bridge cameras with constant aperture ==
Model	Sensor size	Optical zoom	Focal length		Aperture		Pixel count	Weight	EVF	Release year	Availability
Model	Sensor size	Optical zoom	Wide	Tele	Wide	Tele	Pixel count	Weight	EVF	Release year	Availability
Sony RX10 II	1.0-type	8×	24mm	200mm	f/2.8		20 MP	813g	Yes	2015	Discontinued
Sony RX10	1.0-type	8×	24mm	200mm	f/2.8		20 MP	813g	Yes	2013	Discontinued
Olympus Stylus 1s	1/1.7-type	11×	28mm	300mm	f/2.8		12 MP	402g	Yes	2015	Discontinued
Olympus Stylus 1	1/1.7-type	11×	28mm	300mm	f/2.8		12 MP	402g	Yes	2013	Discontinued
Panasonic FZ300 (Note: Known as the FZ330 in some markets.)	1/2.3-type	24×	25mm	600mm	f/2.8		12 MP	691g	Yes	2015	Discontinued
Leica V-Lux 4	1/2.3-type	24×	25mm	600mm	f/2.8		12 MP	588g	Yes	2012	Discontinued
Panasonic FZ200	1/2.3-type	24×	25mm	600mm	f/2.8		12 MP	588g	Yes	2012	Discontinued

The Panasonic FZ1, FZ2, FZ10, and FZ20 from the early 2000s included superzoom lenses with constant aperture, but they are excluded from this list due to their tiny low-resolution CCD sensors that were smaller than 1/2.3-type ("1/2.3-inch").

== Small sensor bridge cameras with at least 60× zoom ==
There are far too many small sensor bridge cameras with less than 60× zoom to list here. Each of the following models contains a 1/2.3-type ("1/2.3-inch") image sensor with a crop factor of 5.6.

Model	Sensor size	Optical zoom	Focal length		Aperture		Pixel count	Weight	EVF	Release year	Availability
Model	Sensor size	Optical zoom	Wide	Tele	Wide	Tele	Pixel count	Weight	EVF	Release year	Availability
Nikon P1100	1/2.3-type	125×	24.0mm	3000mm	f/2.8	f/8.0	16 MP	1410g	Yes	2025	Current
Nikon P1000	1/2.3-type	125×	24.0mm	3000mm	f/2.8	f/8.0	16 MP	1415g	Yes	2018	Discontinued
Nikon P950	1/2.3-type	83×	24.0mm	2000mm	f/2.8	f/6.5	16 MP	1005g	Yes	2020	Current
Nikon P900	1/2.3-type	83×	24.0mm	2000mm	f/2.8	f/6.5	16 MP	899g	Yes	2015	Discontinued
Nikon P610	1/2.3-type	60×	24.0mm	1440mm	f/3.3	f/6.5	16 MP	565g	Yes	2015	Discontinued
Nikon P600	1/2.3-type	60×	24.0mm	1440mm	f/3.3	f/6.5	16 MP	565g	Yes	2014	Discontinued
Nikon B700	1/2.3-type	60×	24.0mm	1440mm	f/3.3	f/6.5	20 MP	570g	Yes	2016	Discontinued
Nikon B600	1/2.3-type	60×	24.0mm	1440mm	f/3.3	f/6.5	16 MP	500g	No	2019	Discontinued
Kodak AZ1000	1/2.3-type	102×	19.5mm	1989mm	f/3.0	f/6.8	20 MP	777g	Yes	2018	Discontinued
Kodak AZ901	1/2.3-type	90×	22.0mm	1980mm	f/3.1	f/6.8	20 MP	777g	Yes	2016	Discontinued
Kodak AZ652	1/2.3-type	65×	24.0mm	1560mm	f/2.9	f/6.7	20 MP	602g	Yes	2015	Discontinued
Kodak AZ651	1/2.3-type	65×	24.0mm	1560mm	f/2.9	f/6.5	20 MP	604g	Yes	2014	Discontinued
Minolta MN67Z	1/2.3-type	67×	23.4mm	1568mm	f/2.9	f/6.7	20 MP	622g	Yes	2020	Current
Canon SX70	1/2.3-type	65×	21.0mm	1365mm	f/3.4	f/5.6	20 MP	610g	Yes	2017	Discontinued
Canon SX60	1/2.3-type	65×	21.0mm	1365mm	f/3.4	f/5.6	16 MP	650g	Yes	2014	Discontinued
Sony H400	1/2.3-type	63×	24.5mm	1550mm	f/3.4	f/6.5	20 MP	655g	Yes	2014	Discontinued
Panasonic FZ80D (Note: Known as the FZ82D in some markets.)	1/2.3-type	60×	20.0mm	1200mm	f/2.8	f/5.9	18 MP	640g	Yes	2024	Current
Panasonic FZ80 (Note: Known as the FZ82 in some markets.)	1/2.3-type	60×	20.0mm	1200mm	f/2.8	f/5.9	18 MP	616g	Yes	2017	Discontinued
Panasonic FZ70 (Note: Known as the FZ72 in some markets.)	1/2.3-type	60×	20.0mm	1200mm	f/2.8	f/5.9	16 MP	606g	Yes	2013	Discontinued
Samsung WB2200F	1/2.3-type	60×	20.0mm	1200mm	f/2.8	f/5.9	16 MP	708g	Yes	2014	Discontinued

== See also ==
- List of superzoom compact cameras
- List of large sensor fixed-lens cameras
- List of lightest mirrorless cameras
- List of superzoom lenses
- Canon PowerShot SX
- Sony Cyber-shot
- Fujifilm FinePix
- Nikon Coolpix
- Panasonic Lumix
- Point-and-shoot camera
