= Nikon AF-S DX Nikkor 18-140mm f/3.5-5.6G ED VR =

AF-S DX Nikkor 18-140mm f/3.5–5.6G ED VR
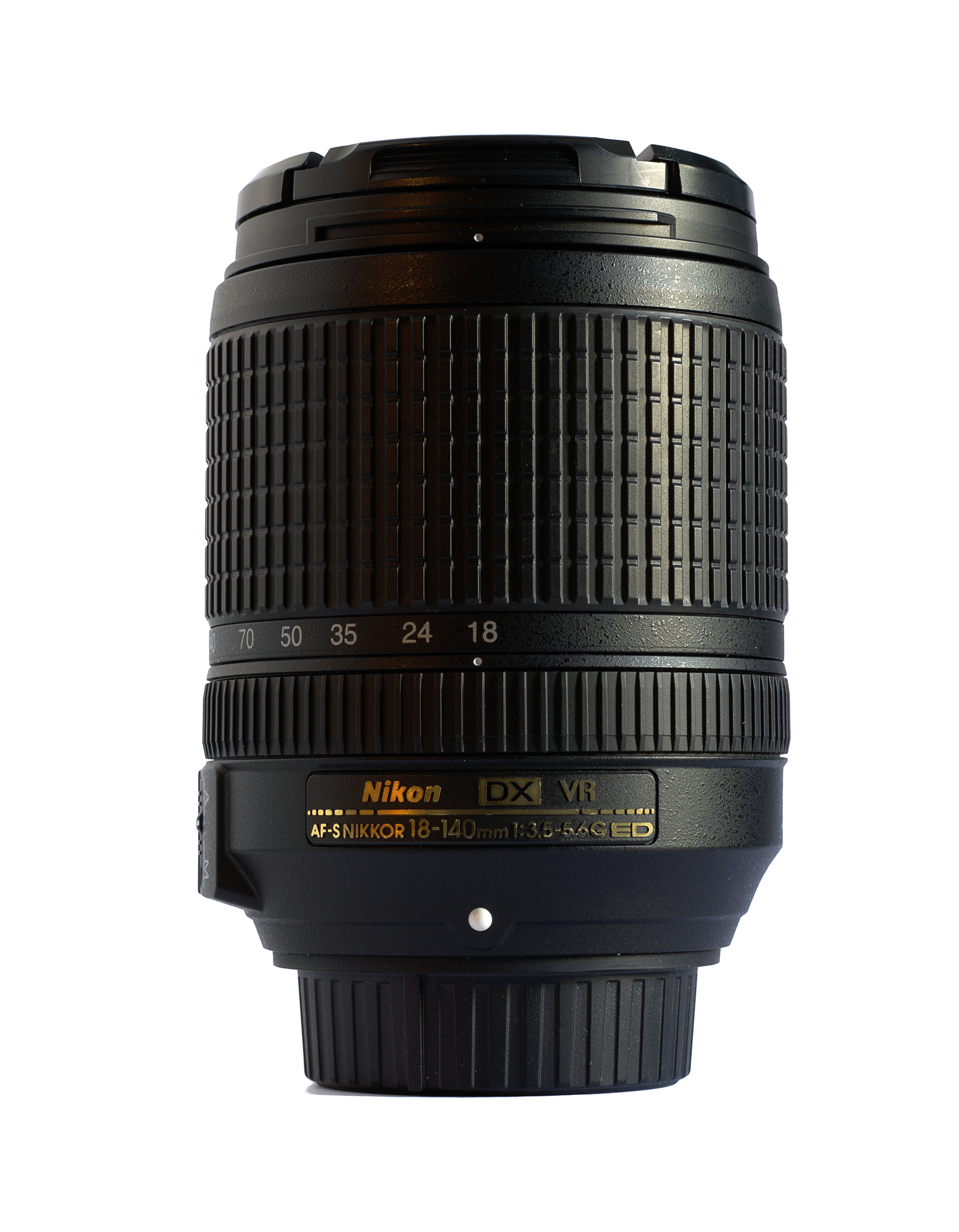
- Maker: Nikon
- Lens mount: F-mount

Technical data
- Type: Zoom
- Focal length: 18-140mm
- Focal length (35mm equiv.): 27-210mm
- Crop factor: 1.5
- Aperture (max/min): f/3.5–22 (wide) f/5.6–38 (tele)
- Close focus distance: 45cm
- Diaphragm blades: 7
- Construction: 17 elements in 12 groups

Features
- Ultrasonic motor: Yes Yes
- Lens-based stabilization: Yes Yes
- Macro capable: No No
- Application: Superzoom

Physical
- Max. length: 97 mm (@ 18mm)
- Diameter: 78 mm
- Weight: 490 gram
- Filter diameter: 67mm

Accessories
- Lens hood: HB-32
- Case: CL-1018

History
- Introduction: August 2013

Retail info
- MSRP: 596.95 USD (as of 2015)

The AF-S DX Nikkor 18-140mm f/3.5–5.6G ED VR is a superzoom lens manufactured by Nikon, introduced in August 2013 for use on Nikon DX format digital SLR cameras.

The lens includes vibration reduction to counter camera shake. It uses an extra-low dispersion glass element to minimize chromatic aberration. Internal focusing and silent wave motor are focus characteristics. Two switches are provided on the lens. One of them can be used to switch vibration reduction on/off and the other is used to switch between auto-focus and manual focus. Like all lenses in the DX format, the 18-140mm casts a smaller image circle than lenses for full-frame 35mm cameras and is therefore only compatible with cameras having APS-C-sized sensors (or vignetting will result).

== See also ==
- List of Nikon compatible lenses with integrated autofocus-motor
- Nikon F-mount
