= Sony Cyber-shot DSC-H400 =

Digital camera model

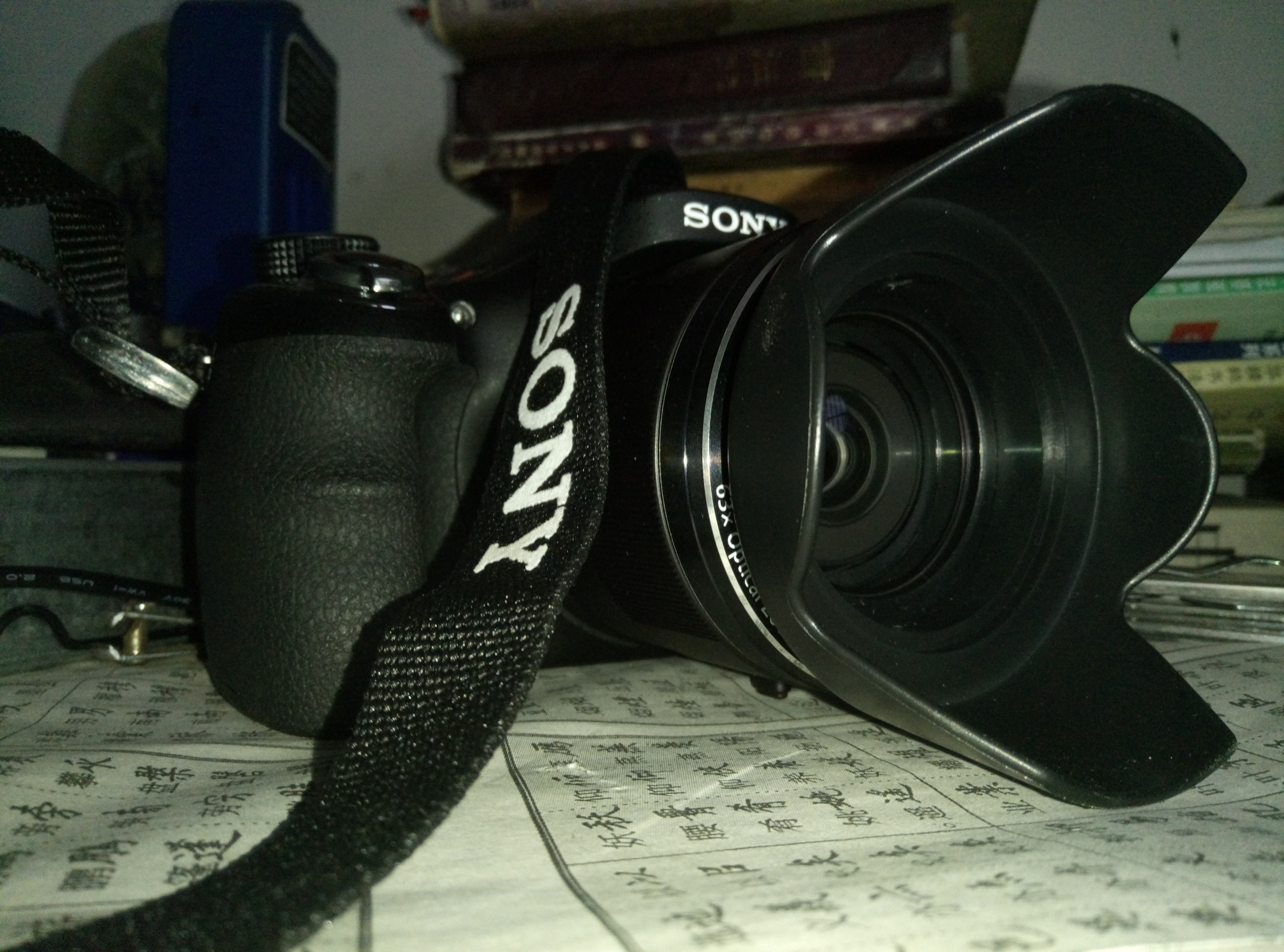

Overview
- Maker: Sony

Lens
- Lens: 25-1550mm equivalent
- F-numbers: f/3.4-f/6.5 at the widest

Sensor/medium
- Sensor type: CCD
- Sensor size: 6.17 x 4.55mm (1/2.3 inch type)
- Maximum resolution: 5152 x 3864 (20 megapixels)
- Film speed: 80-3200
- Recording medium: SD, SDHC, or SDXC memory card, or Memory Stick PRO Duo/Pro-HG Duo

Shutter
- Shutter speeds: 1/2000s to 30s
- Continuous shooting: 1 frame per second

Viewfinder
- Frame coverage: 100%

Image processing
- Image processor: Bionz(R)
- White balance: Yes

General
- Video recording: 720p at 30fps
- LCD screen: 3 inches with 460,000 dots
- Dimensions: 130 x 95 x 122mm (5.1 x 3.74 x 4.81 inches)
- Weight: 655 g (23 oz) including battery

The Sony Cyber-shot DSC-H400 is a DSLR-like ultrazoom bridge camera announced by Sony on February 13, 2014. At the time of its release, it was the compact camera with the longest reach, with a maximum equivalent focal length of 1550mm. In March 2015, the Nikon Coolpix P900 was released with 2000mm equivalent maximum focal length.

== See also ==
- List of bridge cameras
