= Canon PowerShot SX60 HS =

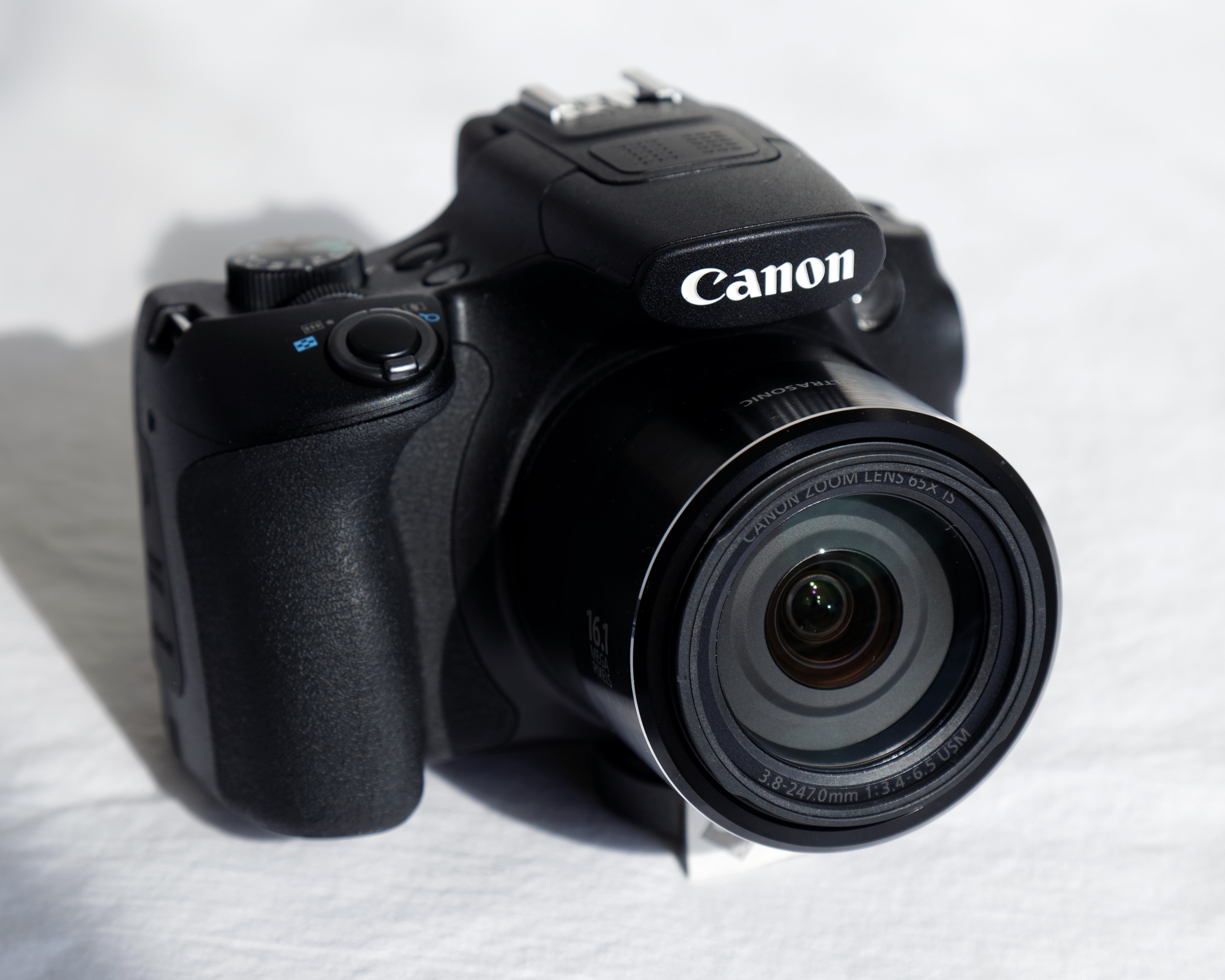

Overview
- Maker: Canon

Lens
- Lens: 3.8–247.0 mm (35 mm equivalent: 21-1365 mm)
- F-numbers: f/3.4 to f/6.5 at the widest (35 mm equivalent: f/18.8 to f/35.9)

Sensor/medium
- Sensor type: CMOS
- Sensor size: 1/2.3" (6.17 x 4.55 mm)
- Maximum resolution: 16.1 megapixels
- Film speed: 125 – 12,800

Flash
- Flash: Inbuilt

Shutter
- Frame rate: Up to 6.4 frames per second
- Shutter speeds: 1/2000 s to 15 s

Viewfinder
- Viewfinder: Electronic, 640×480 pixels (922k dots)

Image processing
- Image processor: DIGIC 6

General
- LCD screen: 3 in, 640×480 pixels (922k dots), articulated

The Canon PowerShot SX60 HS is a digital ultra-zoom bridge camera announced by Canon Inc. on September 15, 2014. It has one of the longest zoom ranges of any digital camera. It features a 65× optical zoom that covers the 35mm equivalent of 21-1365mm. It is the first Canon camera in this class that has an external microphone jack.

== Compared to SX50 ==
Type	PowerShot SX50 HS	PowerShot SX60 HS
Pixels	12.1 MP	16.1 MP
Focal range	(50X) 4.3–215 mm	(65X) 3.8–247.0 mm
Aperture range	f/3.4 - f/6.5	f/3.4 - f/6.5
ISO range	80 - 6400	100 - 6400
LCD size	2.8, 480×320 pixels, 3:2	3.0, 640×480 pixels, 4:3
Weight	551 g	649 g
DIGIC	5	6

== See also ==
- List of bridge cameras
