= Nikon Coolpix P610 =

Digital camera model

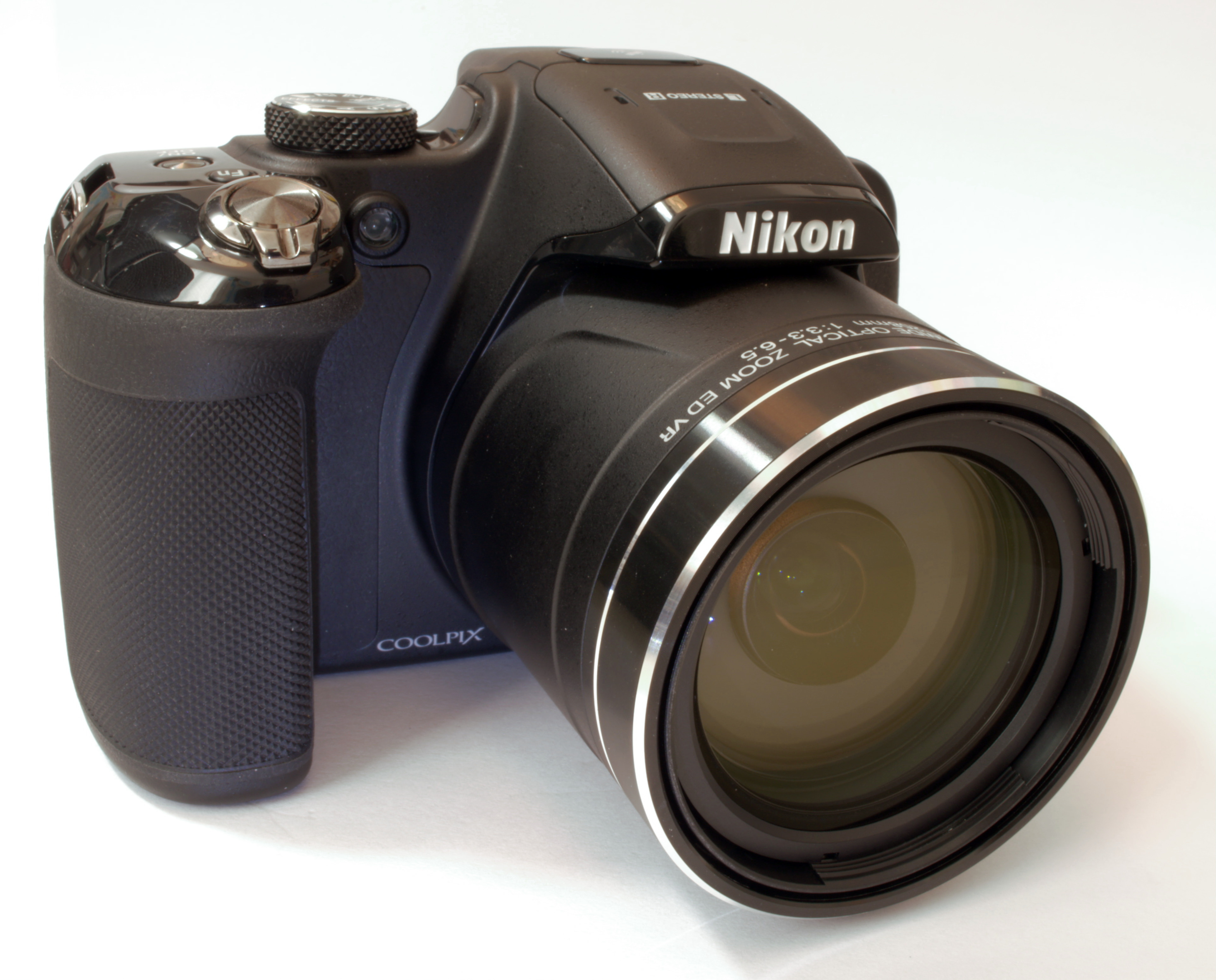

Overview
- Maker: Nikon

Lens
- Lens: 24-1440mm equivalent
- F-numbers: f/3.3-f/6.5 at the widest

Sensor/medium
- Sensor type: BSI-CMOS
- Sensor size: 6.17 x 4.55mm (1/2.3 inch type)
- Maximum resolution: 4608 x 3456 (16 megapixels)
- Recording medium: SD, SDHC or SDXC card

Shutter
- Shutter speeds: 1/4000s to 15s
- Continuous shooting: 7 frames per second

Image processing
- White balance: Yes

General
- LCD screen: 3 inches with 921,000 dots
- Dimensions: 125 x 85 x 107mm (4.92 x 3.35 x 4.21 inches)
- Weight: 565 g (20 oz) including battery

Footnotes
- It has built in GPS.

The Nikon Coolpix P610 is a superzoom bridge camera announced by Nikon on February 10, 2015.

It differs from its predecessor, the Nikon Coolpix P600, with the inclusion of a sensor to automatically switch between monitor mode and the electronic viewfinder, a timelapse mode, and full HD video at 60 frames per second progressive (60p as opposed to 60i; i.e. as considered better than the P600's 60 frame maximum being interlaced video.)

It has built in GPS with GLONASS, that can be selected to write to each image's Exif data.

== See also ==
- List of bridge cameras
