= Tamron 18-270mm F/3.5-6.3 Di II VC PZD =

- Maker: Tamron
- Lens mount(s): Canon EF-S, Nikon F (DX), Sony/Minolta Alpha DT

Technical data
- Type: Zoom
- Focus drive: Micro-type ultrasonic
- Focal length: 18-270mm
- Aperture (max/min): f/3.5 - f/6.3
- Close focus distance: 0.49 metres (1.6 ft)
- Max. magnification: 0.26
- Diaphragm blades: 7
- Construction: 16 elements in 13 groups

Features
- Weather-sealing: No No
- Lens-based stabilization: Yes Yes except Sony Alpha

Physical
- Diameter: 74 millimetres (2.9 in)
- Weight: 450 grams (0.99 lb)
- Filter diameter: 62.0mm

History
- Introduction: 2010
- Discontinuation: 2014
- Successor: Tamron 16-300mm F/3.5-6.3 Di II VC PZD MACRO

Retail info
- MSRP: 650 USD

The Tamron 18-270mm F/3.5-6.3 Di II VC PZD is a superzoom lens for APS-C DSLR cameras, announced by Tamron on December 9, 2010. The Sony/Minolta A mount version is simply called Tamron 18-270mm F/3.5-6.3 Di II PZD as it lacks image stabilisation (VC, or Vibration Compensation, in Tamron classification).

Compared to its predecessor, the Tamron AF 18-270mm F/3.5-6.3 Di II VC LD Aspherical (IF) MACRO, it is considerably reduced in size and features an ultrasonic motor (Piezo Drive in Tamron nomenclature).
