= Sony Cyber-shot DSC-RX10 II =

Digital camera model

Overview
- Maker: Sony

Lens
- Lens: 24-200mm equivalent
- F-numbers: f/2.8 at the widest

Sensor/medium
- Sensor type: BSI-CMOS
- Sensor size: 13.2 x 8.8mm (1 inch type)
- Maximum resolution: 5472 x 3648 (20 megapixels)
- Recording medium: SD, SDHC or SDXC memory card or Memory Stick Duo/Pro Duo/Pro-HG Duo

Focusing
- Focus areas: 25 focus points

Shutter
- Shutter speeds: 1/32000s to 30s
- Continuous shooting: 14 frames per second

Viewfinder
- Viewfinder magnification: 0.7
- Frame coverage: 100%

Image processing
- Image processor: Bionz X
- White balance: Yes

General
- Video recording: 2160p@30fps, 1080p@120fps (real-time+audio), lower resolutions: 240fps, 480fps, 960fps (high-speed video; no audio)
- LCD screen: 3 inches with 1,228,800 dots
- Dimensions: 129 x 88 x 102mm (5.08 x 3.46 x 4.02 inches)
- Weight: 813 g (29 oz) including battery

The Sony Cyber-shot DSC-RX10 II is a DSLR-styled digital bridge camera announced by Sony on June 10, 2015. Its main improvement over its predecessor, the 2013 Sony Cyber-shot DSC-RX10, is its 2160p 4K video recording ability, as well as added high-framerate with 1080p doubled to 120fps (real-time and retained audio), and high speed video at 240fps, 480fps, and 960fps.

While filming at up to 1080p and up to 60fps, 17-Megapixel still images can be captured. The "dual video recording" mode allows recording into two separate files with different resolution, where one is more "lightweight" (Note: Sources do not mention whether this refers to resolution, framerate, and/or bitrate, and how much exactly is changed.) than the other.

== See also ==
- Sony Cyber-shot DSC-RX100 series
- List of large sensor fixed-lens cameras
- List of bridge cameras
