= Nikon Coolpix P600 =

Digital camera model

Overview
- Maker: Nikon

Lens
- Lens: 4.3-258mm (24-1440 mm equivalent)
- F-numbers: 3.3 - 6.5 at the widest

Sensor/medium
- Sensor type: BSI-CMOS
- Sensor size: 6.17 x 4.55 mm (1/2.3 inch type)
- Maximum resolution: 4608 x 3456 (16.1 megapixels)
- Recording medium: SD/SDHC/SDXC

Shutter
- Shutter speeds: 15s - 1/4000s
- Continuous shooting: 7 frames per second

Image processing
- White balance: Yes

General
- LCD screen: 3 inches with 921,000 dots
- Dimensions: 125 x 85 x 107 mm (4.92 x 3.35 x 4.21 inches)
- Weight: 565 g (20 oz) including battery
- Made in: China

The Nikon Coolpix P600 is a DSLR-like ultrazoom bridge camera announced by Nikon on February 7, 2014.

At its announcement date, it was briefly the bridge or compact camera with the largest maximum equivalent focal length, at 1440 mm, but was succeeded in this position only a few days later with the announcement of the Sony Cyber-shot DSC-H400 with 1550 mm maximum equivalent focal length.

The camera can also be connected to the Internet, the first of its kind.

== See also ==
- List of bridge cameras
