= Panasonic Lumix DMC-FZ200 =

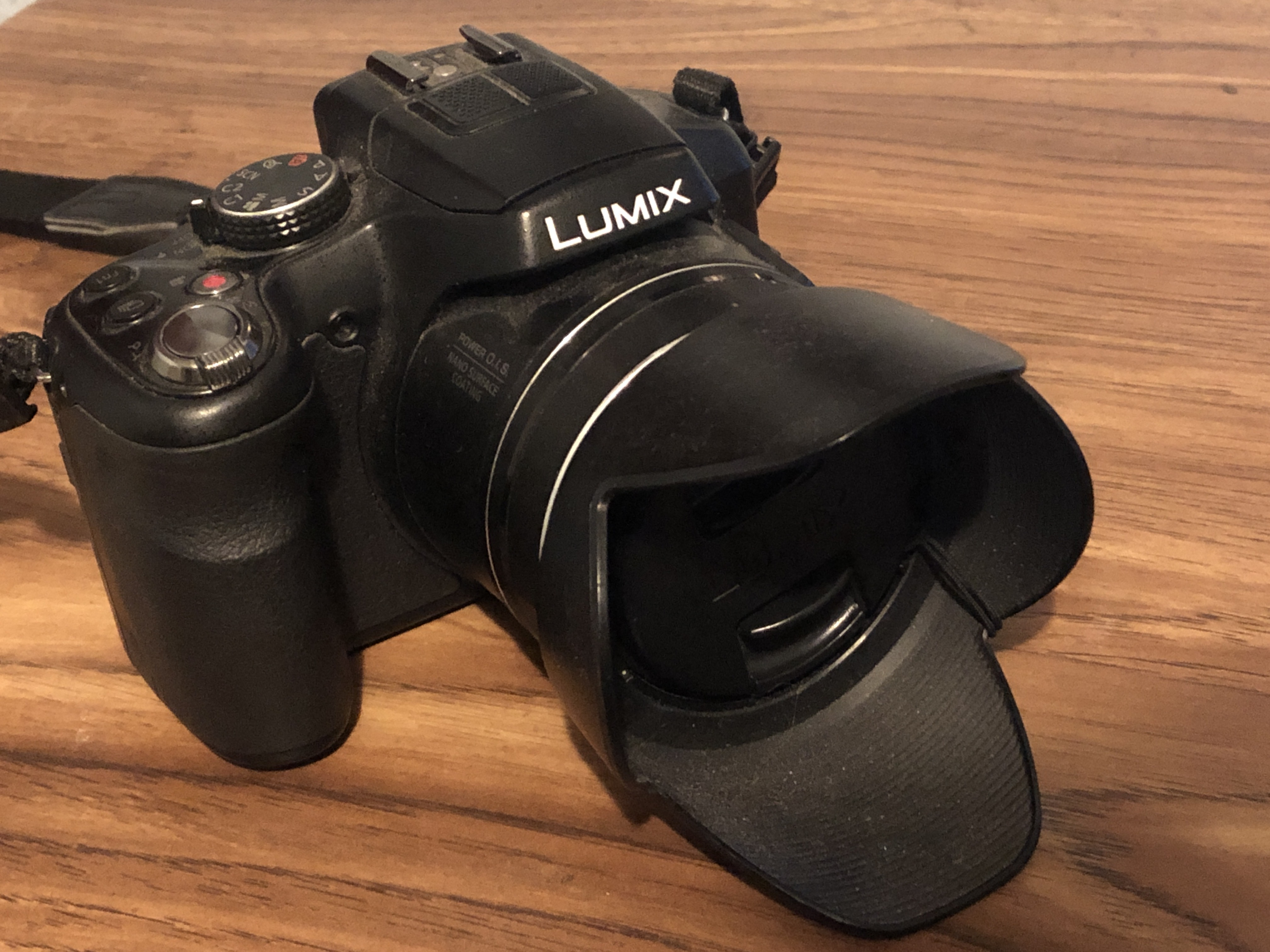
- The Lumix DMC-FZ200

Overview
- Maker: Panasonic Lumix
- Type: Digital bridge camera

Lens
- Lens mount: built in
- Lens: Leica DC Vario-Elmarit 4.5-108 mm f/2.8
- F-numbers: 2.8 - 8

Sensor/medium
- Sensor type: MOS
- Sensor size: 1 / 2.3"
- Maximum resolution: 12 megapixels
- Film speed: 100-3200 (6400 expanded)
- Recording medium: BSI-CMOS
- Storage media: SD, SDHC, SDXC

Focusing
- Focus modes: Normal/AF macro/MF/Quick AF On/off, Continuous AF
- Focus areas: Normal: wide 30 cm - infinity/tele 200 cm - infinity/AF macro/MF/Intelligent AUTO/motion picture. Wide 1 cm - infinity/tele 100 cm - infinity

Flash
- Flash: Built-in

Shutter
- Frame rate: 2 - 12
- Shutter speeds: 1/4000 second to 60 secs

Viewfinder
- Viewfinder: 1,312,000 pixels

General
- LCD screen: 3.0" free-angle TFT screen LCD
- Battery: Li-ion battery pack (7.2V, minimum: 1,200mAh)
- Dimensions: 125.2×86.6×110.2 mm (4.93×3.41×4.34 in)
- Weight: 588 g (21 oz) with battery and memory card

Panasonic Lumix DMC-FZ200 is a digital camera by Panasonic Lumix, which was announced in July 2012. The highest-resolution pictures it records is 12 megapixels, through a 25 - 600 mm (equiv) Leica DC Vario-Elmarit.

== Features ==
- F2.8 aperture across entire zoom range
- 24x power O.I.S. Leica 25 - 600 mm (equiv)
- 12 fps burst rate
- Full 1080/60p HD video

== See also ==
- List of bridge cameras
