= Sony Cyber-shot DSC-RX10 =

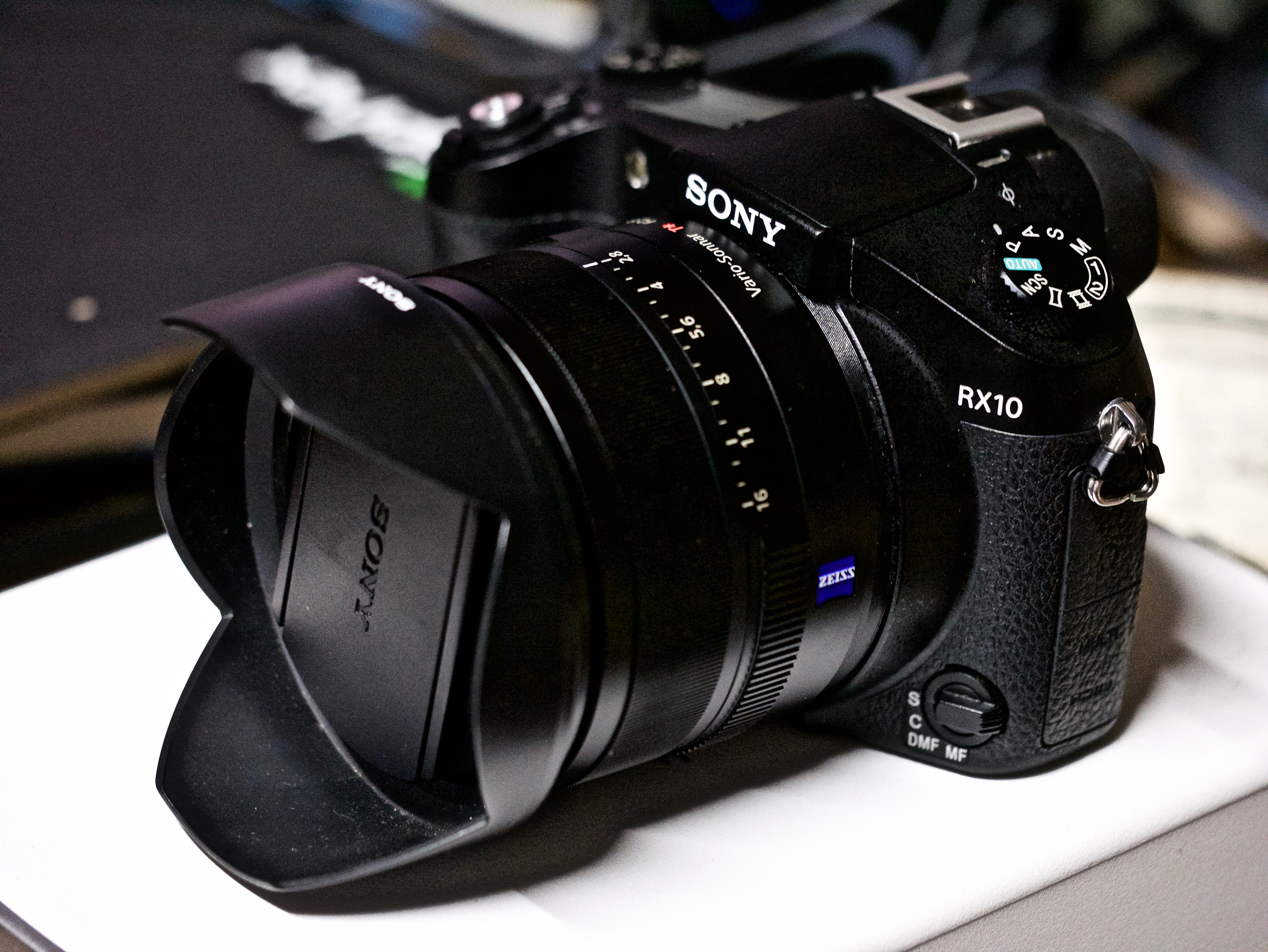

Overview
- Maker: Sony
- Type: Digital superzoom bridge

Lens
- Lens: Carl Zeiss Vario Sonnar T* 2,8/8,8-73,3 (24 – 200mm equivalent)
- F-numbers: 2.8 at the widest; constant throughout optical zoom

Sensor/medium
- Sensor type: BSI-CMOS
- Sensor size: 13.2 x 8.8 mm (1 inch type)
- Maximum resolution: 5472 x 3648 (20 megapixels)
- Recording medium: SD/SDXC/SDHC cards, Memory Stick Duo/Pro Duo/Pro-HG Duo

Shutter
- Continuous shooting: 10 frames per second

Viewfinder
- Viewfinder: Electronic, 1,440,000 dots

General
- LCD screen: 3 inches, 1,228,800 dots
- Dimensions: 129 x 88 x 102mm (5.08 x 3.46 x 4.02 inches)
- Weight: 813 g (29 oz) with battery

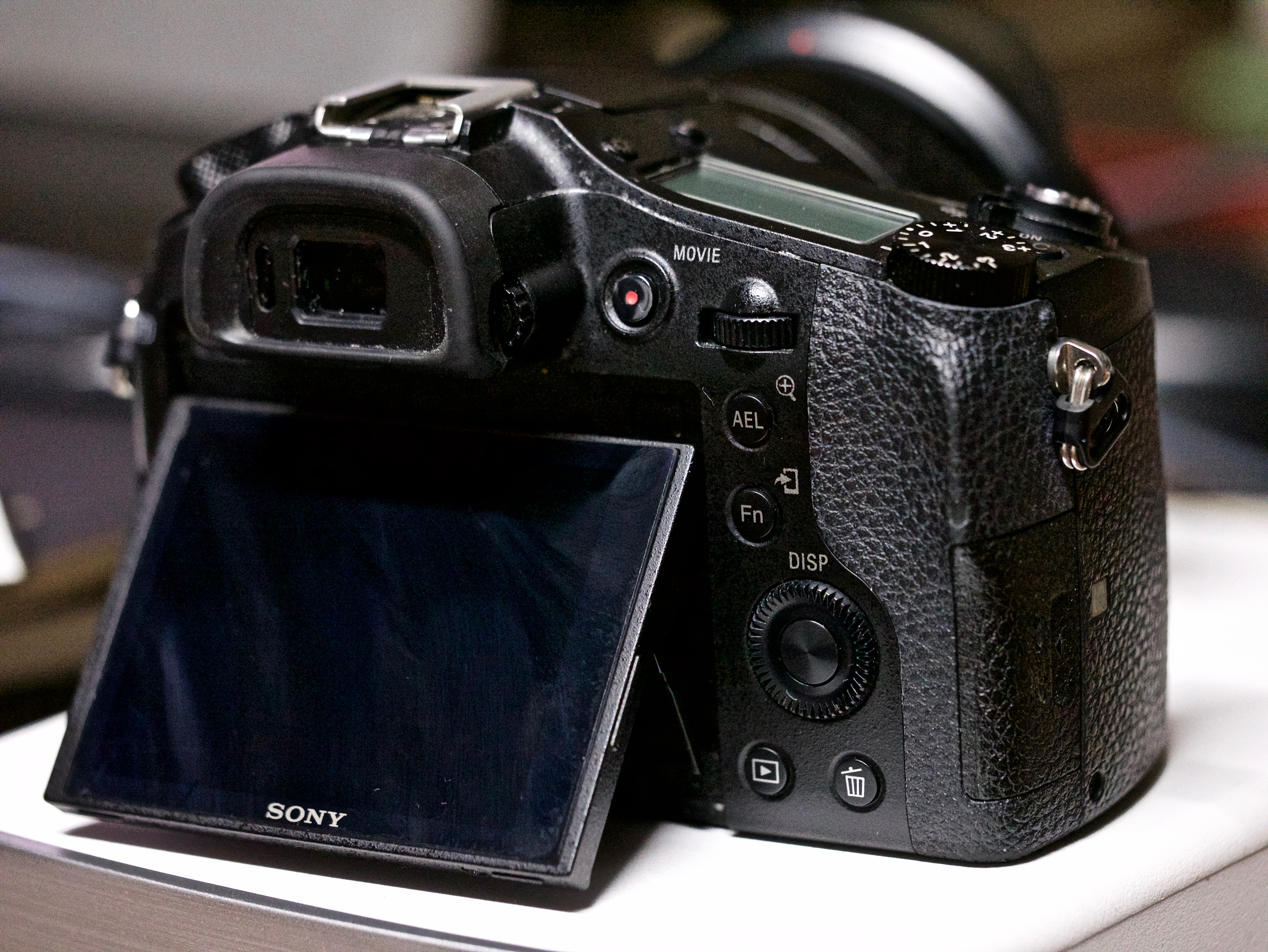
Sony Cyber-shot DSC-RX10 (back)

The Sony Cyber-shot DSC-RX10 is a digital superzoom bridge camera made by Sony. It was announced on October 16, 2013.

It has 20 megapixels and supports video recording with 1080p at up 60 fps. Its single-axis articulating screen can tilt upwards-facing. The lens is labelled with focal length markers. It can be connected to a smartphone through NFC and WiFi Direct.

In comparison to its main competitor, the Panasonic Lumix DMC-FZ1000 released the following year, it is equipped with an ND filter, is weather-sealed, the f/2.8 aperture remains constant throughout its 8.3× optical zoom, and the unit is equipped with two rotary knobs around the lens, a numerical and backlit top display for quick review of photography parameters including exposure and ISO and battery level, and an additional mode dial-like knob for exposure value, and 3.5mm headphone connector, whereas the FZ1000 is equipped with twice the optical zoom, 2160p (4K) video, slow motion video with 100fps at 1080p, faster launching and autofocus and burst shot, a two-axis articulating screen, and five function buttons.

== See also ==
- Sony Cyber-shot DSC-RX100 series
- List of large sensor fixed-lens cameras
- List of bridge cameras
