= 35 mm equivalent focal length =

Camera setup

The resulting images from 50 mm and 70 mm lenses for different sensor sizes; 36x24 mm (red) and 24x18 mm (blue)

In photography, the 35 mm equivalent focal length is a measure of the angle of view for a particular combination of a camera lens and film or image sensor size. The term is popular because in the early years of digital photography, most photographers experienced with interchangeable lenses were most familiar with the 35 mm film format.

On any 35 mm film camera, a 28 mm lens is a wide-angle lens, and a 200 mm lens is a long-focus lens. Because digital cameras have mostly replaced film cameras and the image sensor size that also determines the angle of view is not standardized as the film size was, there is no uniform relation between the lens focal length and the angle of view due to possibilities of using various image sensor sizes at the same focal length (i.e., a different image sensor size resulting in a different angle of view at the same lens focal length). The 35 mm equivalent focal length of a particular lens–sensor combination is the focal length that one would need for a 35 mm film camera to obtain the same angle of view. Two lens-sensor combinations with the same 35 mm equivalent focal length are expected to have the same angle of view.

Most commonly, the 35 mm equivalent focal length is based on equal diagonal angle of view. This definition is also in the CIPA guideline DCG-001. Alternatively, it may sometimes be based on horizontal angle of view. Since 35 mm film is normally used for images with an aspect ratio (width-to-height ratio) of 3:2, while many digital cameras have a 4:3 aspect ratio, which have different diagonal-to-width ratios, these two definitions are often not equivalent, i.e., the equivalent focal length based on the diagonal angle of view differs from the equivalent focal length based on the horizontal angle of view.

== Calculation ==
35 mm equivalent focal lengths are calculated by multiplying the actual focal length of the lens by the crop factor of the sensor. Typical crop factors are 1.26× – 1.29× for Canon (1.35× for Sigma "H") APS-H format, 1.5× for Nikon APS-C ("DX") format (also used by Sony, Pentax, Fuji, Samsung and others), 1.6× for Canon APS-C format, 2× for Micro Four Thirds format, 2.7× for 1-inch sensors (used in Nikon 1 cameras and some Sony RX cameras), 5× to 6× for compact digital cameras, and even higher for built-in cameras of mobile devices like cell phones or tablets.

According to CIPA guidelines, 35 mm equivalent focal length is to be calculated like this: "Converted focal length into 35 mm camera" = (Diagonal distance of image area in the 35 mm camera (43.27 mm) / Diagonal distance of image area on the image sensor of the DSC) × focal length of the lens of the DSC.

== Depth of field equivalent ==
Quoted 35 mm equivalent focal lengths typically ignore depth of field (DOF), which depends on both focal length and aperture. The DOF of smaller sensors is deeper at a given f number, due to the smaller absolute aperture diameters corresponding to shorter focal length lenses.

Equivalent depth of field can be calculated the same way using the crop factor. For example, a 50mm f/2 lens on a 2× crop factor Micro Four Thirds camera would be equivalent to a 100 mm (= 2×50 mm) f/4 (= f/(2×2)) lens on a full-frame digital SLR in terms of field of view, depth of field, total light gathered, and diffraction effects. However for the purposes of exposure calculations the aperture does not change for different sensor sizes.

== Conversions ==
A standard 35 mm film image is 36 mm wide by 24 mm tall (35 mm refers to the height of the film including the perforations for film transport), and the diagonal is 43.3 mm. This leads to the following conversion formulas for a lens with a true focal length f:

Image size	diagonal-based EFL	width-based EFL
4:3 (sensor width w)	f_{35} = 34.6 f /w mm	f_{35} = 36.0 f /w mm
4:3 (sensor diagonal d)	f_{35} = 43.3 f /d mm	f_{35} = 45.0 f /d mm
3:2 (sensor width w)	f_{35} = 36.0 f /w mm	f_{35} = 36.0 f /w mm
3:2 (sensor diagonal d)	f_{35} = 43.3 f /d mm	f_{35} = 43.3 f /d mm

For historical reasons, sensor size specifications such as 1/2.5" do not match the actual sensor size, but are a bit larger (typically about a factor of 1.5) than the actual sensor diagonal. This is because these sensor size specifications refer to the size of a camera tube, while the usable sensor size is about 2/3 of the size of the tube. Tubes are not used on digital cameras, but the same specifications are used.

Apart from the width- and diagonal-based 35 mm equivalent focal length definitions, there is a third definition: EFL = 50 f /d mm. However, it is not clear to what extent this definition is used.
