= Superzoom =

Lens with an extra-large focal length range

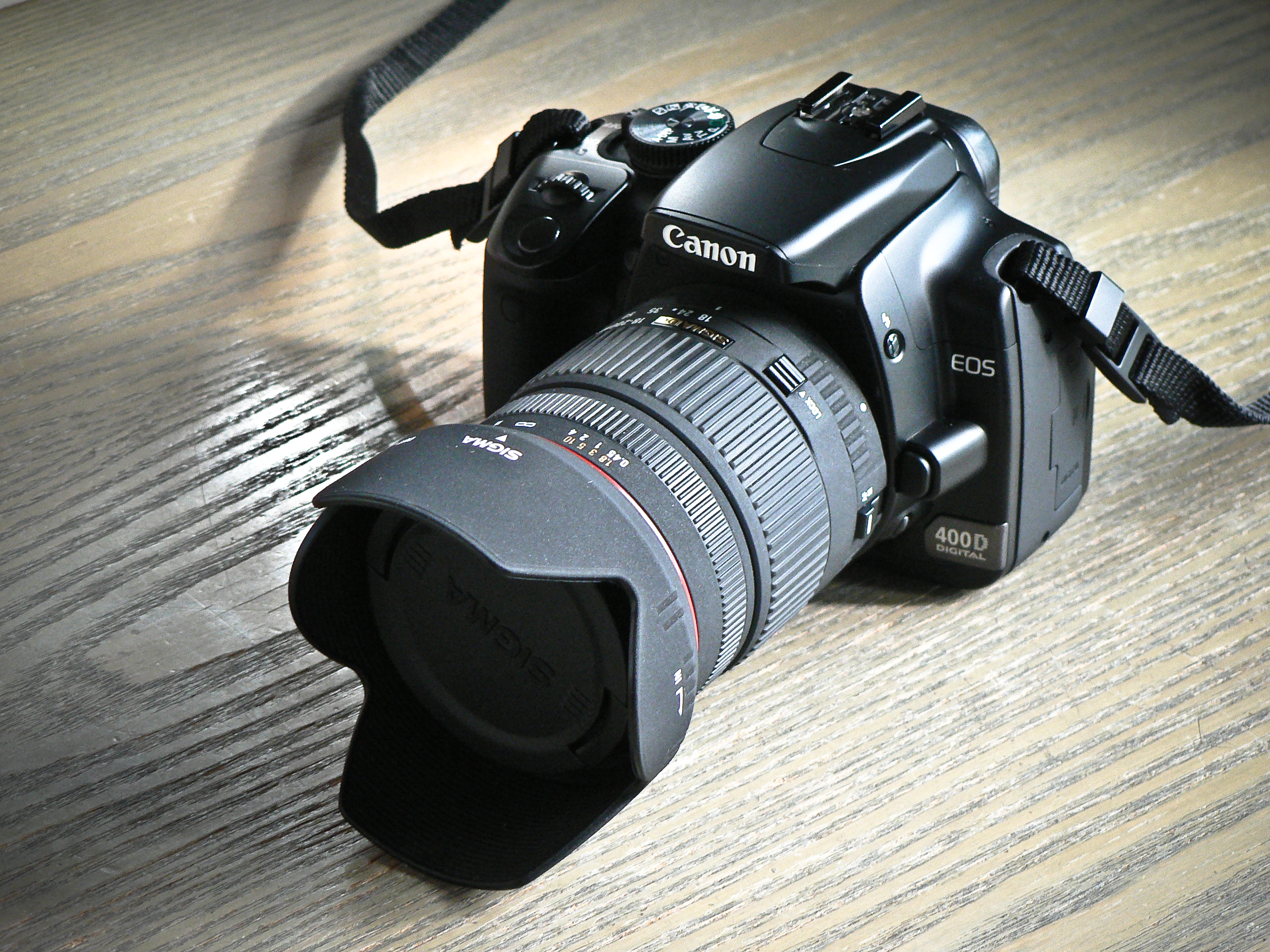
Sigma 18-200mm/3.5-6.3 DC lens attached to a Canon EOS 400D

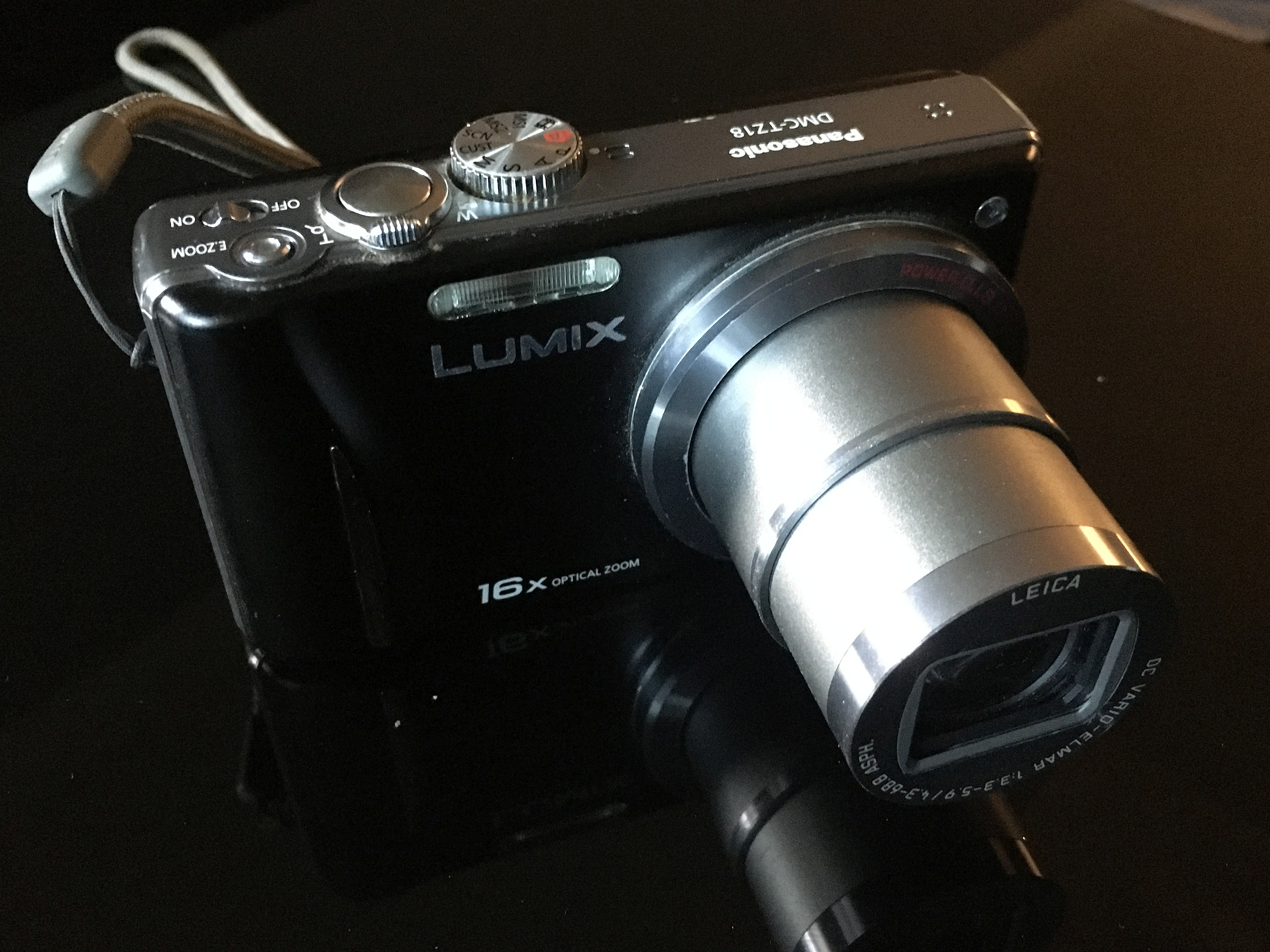
A Panasonic TZ18 compact digital camera's Leica lens with a maximum focal length of 384mm (35mm equiv.) and minimum of 24mm

A superzoom or ultrazoom lens is a type of photographic zoom lens with unconventionally large focal length factors, typically ranging from wide angle to extreme long lens focal lengths in one lens. There is no clear definition of a superzoom lens, but the name generally covers lenses that have a range well above the 3× or 4× (e.g., 28-85 mm or 70-210 mm) of a standard zoom lens, with lenses being 10×, 12×, 18×, or above considered superzoom.

Advantages of a superzoom lens include compositional flexibility, reduced need to swap lenses, and enhanced portability by consolidating the functionality of multiple lenses into one. Due to trade-offs in the optical design, superzoom lenses are noted for having poorer optical quality at the extreme ends of their zoom ranges, often due to distortion. The longer focal lengths are usually accompanied by optical image stabilization in order to be usable handheld.

Two photos of Transfăgărășan showing the zoom range of the Sony H9 camera
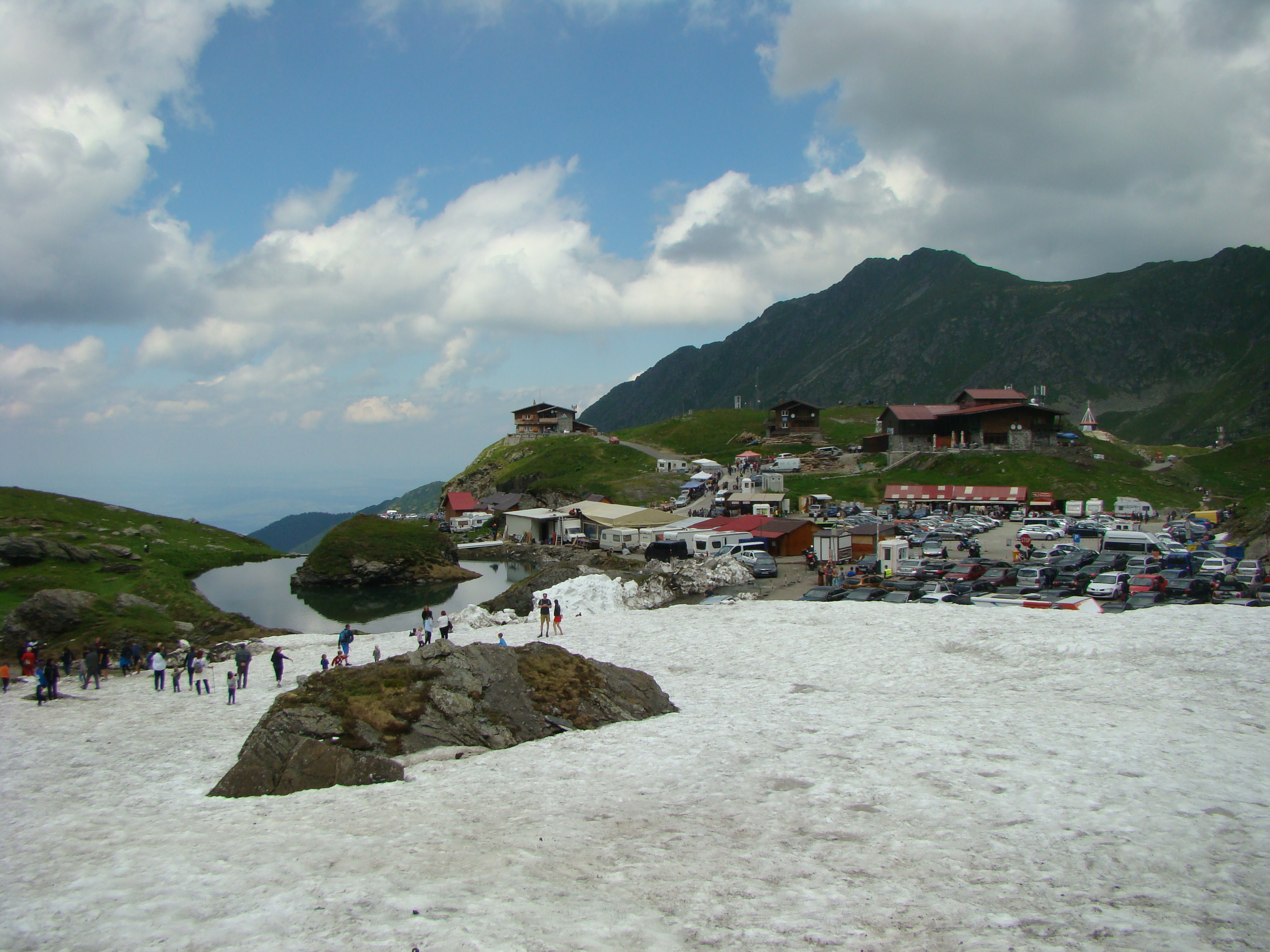

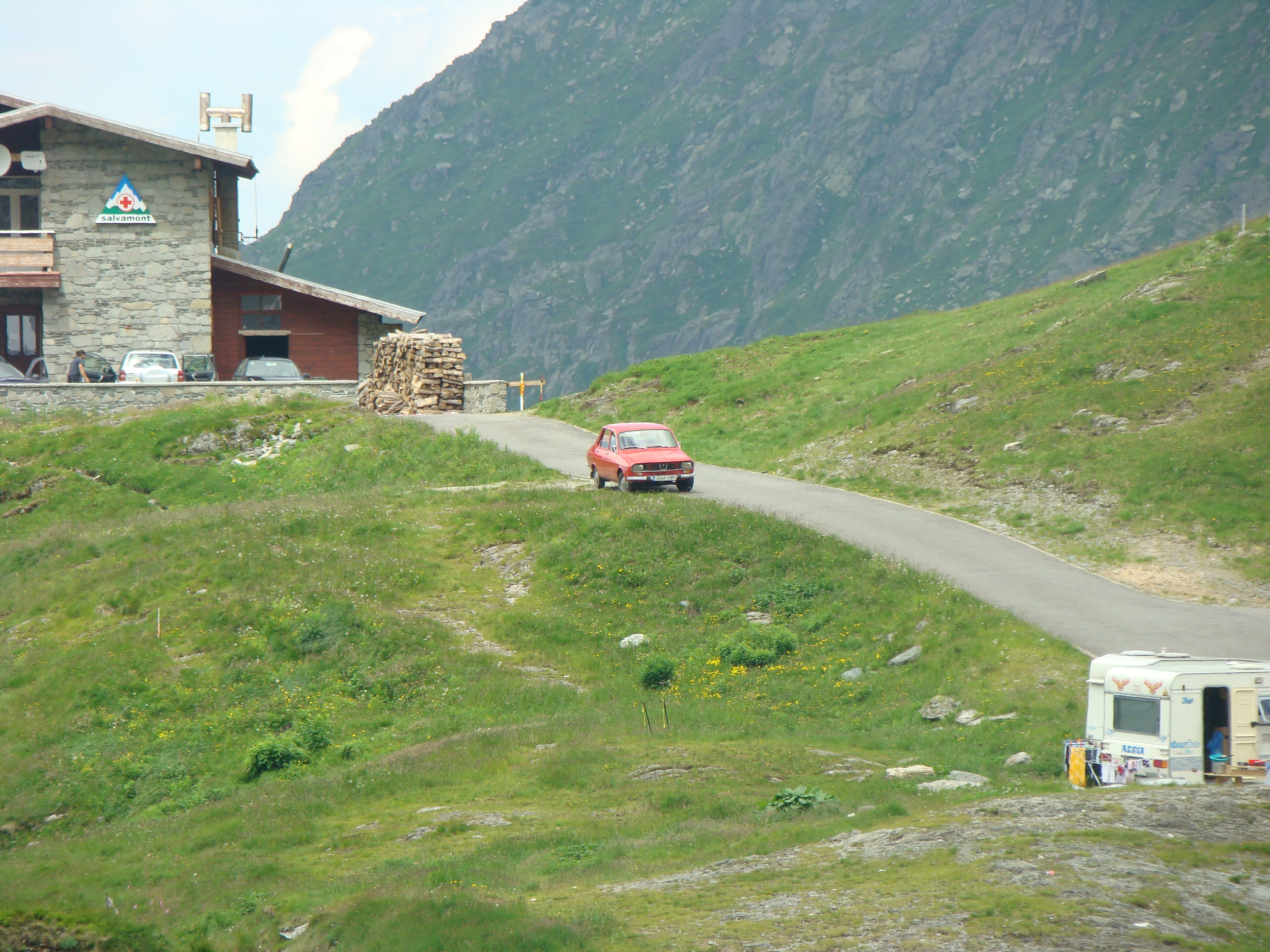

== See also ==
- List of superzoom compact cameras
- List of bridge cameras
