= Olympus XZ-1 =

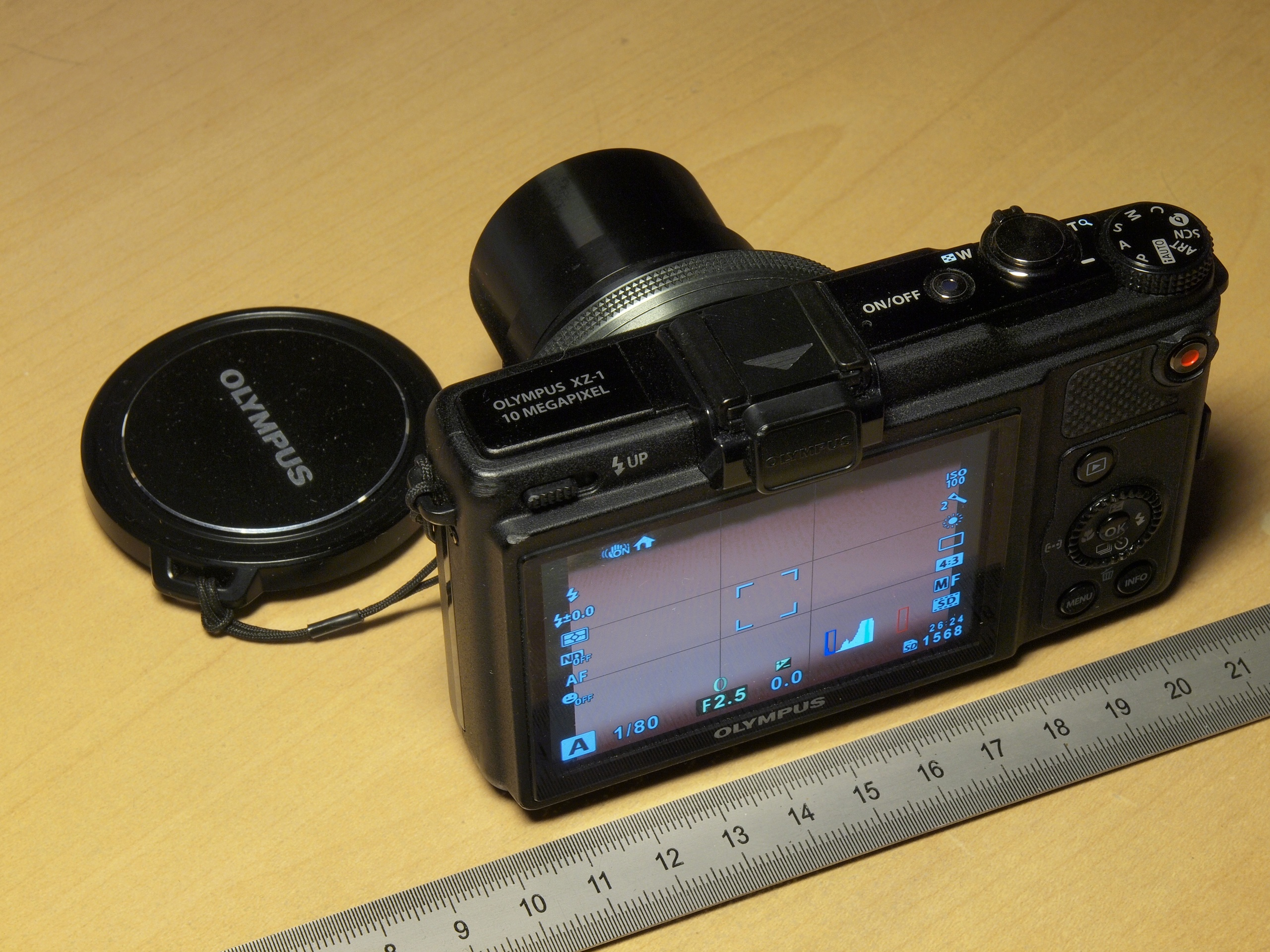

Overview
- Maker: Olympus Corporation
- Type: Digital Camera

Lens
- Lens: 6–24 mm (35mm equivalent: 28–112 mm) f/1.8–f/2.5

Sensor/medium
- Sensor: 1/1.63" CCD
- Maximum resolution: 3664 x 2752 (10 megapixels)
- Film speed: AUTO: ISO 100 - 800 / Manual: ISO 100 - 6400, (in 1/3 EV steps)
- Storage media: Secure Digital card

Shutter
- Shutter speed range: 1/2000 – 60 sec.

General
- LCD screen: 3.0" OLED 614,000 dots
- Battery: Olympus LI-50B Li-Ion
- Dimensions: 110.6×64.8×42.3 mm (4.35×2.55×1.67 in) (W * H * D)
- Weight: 275 g (9.7 oz) excluding battery
- Made in: China

The Olympus XZ-1 is a high-end 10.0 megapixel compact digital camera announced and released in January 2011. Its key features are a fast f/1.8-2.5 i.Zuiko Digital lens, a built in imager shift image stabilizer and Olympus' 6 Art Filters that are also present in the E-PEN series.

== Features ==
Key Features:

- 10.0 megapixels
- f/1.8-2.5 i.Zuiko Digital lens
- 1/1.63" High-Sensitivity CCD
- JPEG (Exif 2.3) support
- Raw image file format
- ISO sensitivity 100–6400
- 6 Art Filters: Pop Art, Soft Focus, Grainy Film, Pin Hole, Diorama, and Dramatic Tone
- Wide-angle zoom lens
- Full manual control
- Front Control Ring to control ISO, shutter speed, or aperture
- Rear Control Dial to control exposure compensation and manual focus
- Four photo aspect ratios: 4:3/3:2/16:9/6:6

== Similar cameras ==
In the high-end compact camera market, its main competitors are the Panasonic Lumix DMC-LX5 and Canon S95 though the S95's lens is considerably slower at most focal lengths. Competing compact cameras which are capable of shooting in Raw mode include Canon PowerShot G12, Fujifilm X10, Nikon Coolpix P7100, Samsung TL500/EX1, and the previously mentioned Panasonic Lumix DMC-LX5.

A similar category to high-end compact cameras are mirrorless interchangeable lens cameras ("MILC"), some of which are in a compact form factor (with a similar-sized body), such as the Panasonic Lumix DMC-GF2, Olympus PEN E-P1/E-P2, and Sony Alpha NEX-3/5. MILCs differ however in being significantly larger (with lens attached), and significantly higher-end, featuring much larger sensors and interchangeable lenses.

The follow-up model Olympus XZ-2 appeared in 2012 and features the same lens, while adding an improved sensor, tilting touch-screen and a two-mode control dial around the lens.

== See also ==
- List of digital cameras with CCD sensors
