= S200 =

S200 may refer to:

== Military, space and aviation ==
- S-200 missile system, a Soviet surface-to-air missile system
- S200, solid rocket booster of Indian LVM3
- SIPA S.200 Minijet, a 1950s French trainer light jet aircraft

== Transportation ==
- Polish railways S200, a diesel locomotive
- Siemens S200, a North American high-floor light rail vehicle
- Toyota Crown (S200), a car
- Toyota Crown Majesta (S200), a car
- USATC S200 Class, a 1941 class of steam locomotive

== Technology ==
- Acer neoTouch S200, a smartphone
- Canon PowerShot S200, a camera
- Casio Exilim S200, a camera
- S200, a Nikon Coolpix series digital camera
- Qtek 200, a mobile phone
