= Panasonic Lumix DMC-LX3 =

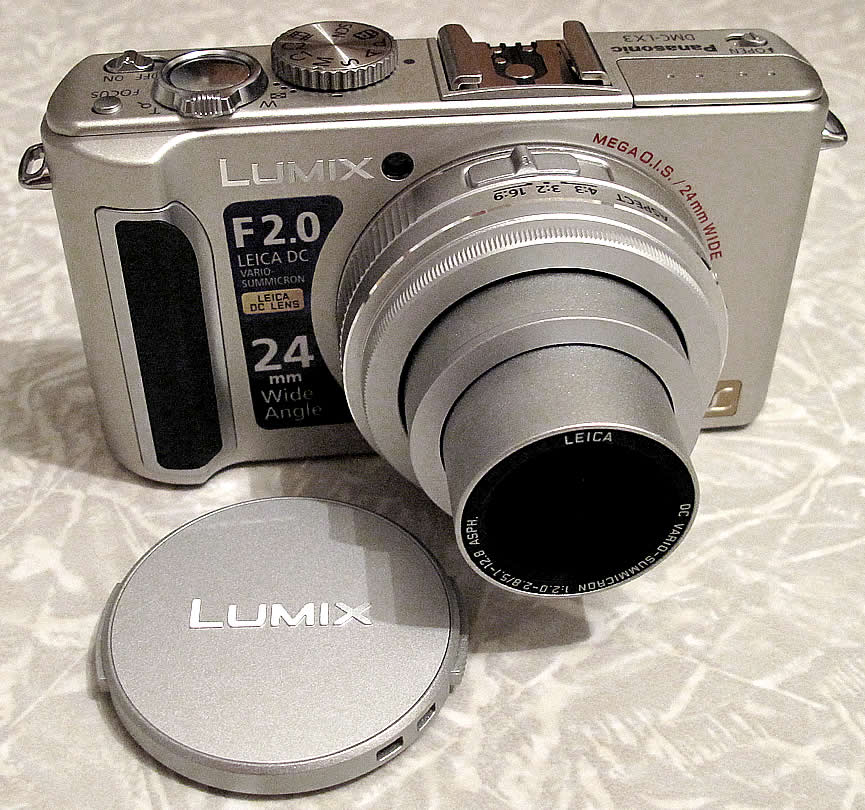

Overview
- Type: Digital Camera

Lens
- Lens: 5.1–12.8 mm (35mm equivalent: 24–60 mm) f/2.0–f/2.8

Sensor/medium
- Sensor: 1/1.63" CCD
- Maximum resolution: 3648 × 2736 (10.0 megapixels)
- Film speed: ISO 80, 100, 125, 160, 200, 250, 320, 400, 500, 640, 800, 1000, 1250, 1600, 2000, 2500, 3200
- Storage media: Secure Digital Card (SD/SDHC)

Focusing
- Focus modes: Single, Continuous (only available in Auto mode), Servo AF/AEl
- Focus areas: TTL (9-point AiAF) 1-point AF (fixed to centre)

Exposure/metering
- Exposure metering: Evaluative, Center-Weighted Average, Spot
- Metering modes: Evaluative, Centre-weighted average, Spot (Centre)

Flash
- Flash: Internal

Shutter
- Shutter speed range: 1/2000 sec–60 sec
- Continuous shooting: Approx. 0.9 frame/s

Image processing
- White balance: Auto, Daylight, Cloudy, Tungsten, Fluorescent, Fluorescent H, Flash, Underwater, Custom

General
- LCD screen: 3.0" Purecolor LCD II (TFT) appro. 460,000 dots
- Battery: Panasonic CGA S005e
- Optional battery packs: AC Adapter Kit ACK-DC40
- Dimensions: 109 mm × 60 mm × 27 mm (W × H × D)
- Weight: 265 g (9.3 oz) excluding battery
- Made in: Japan

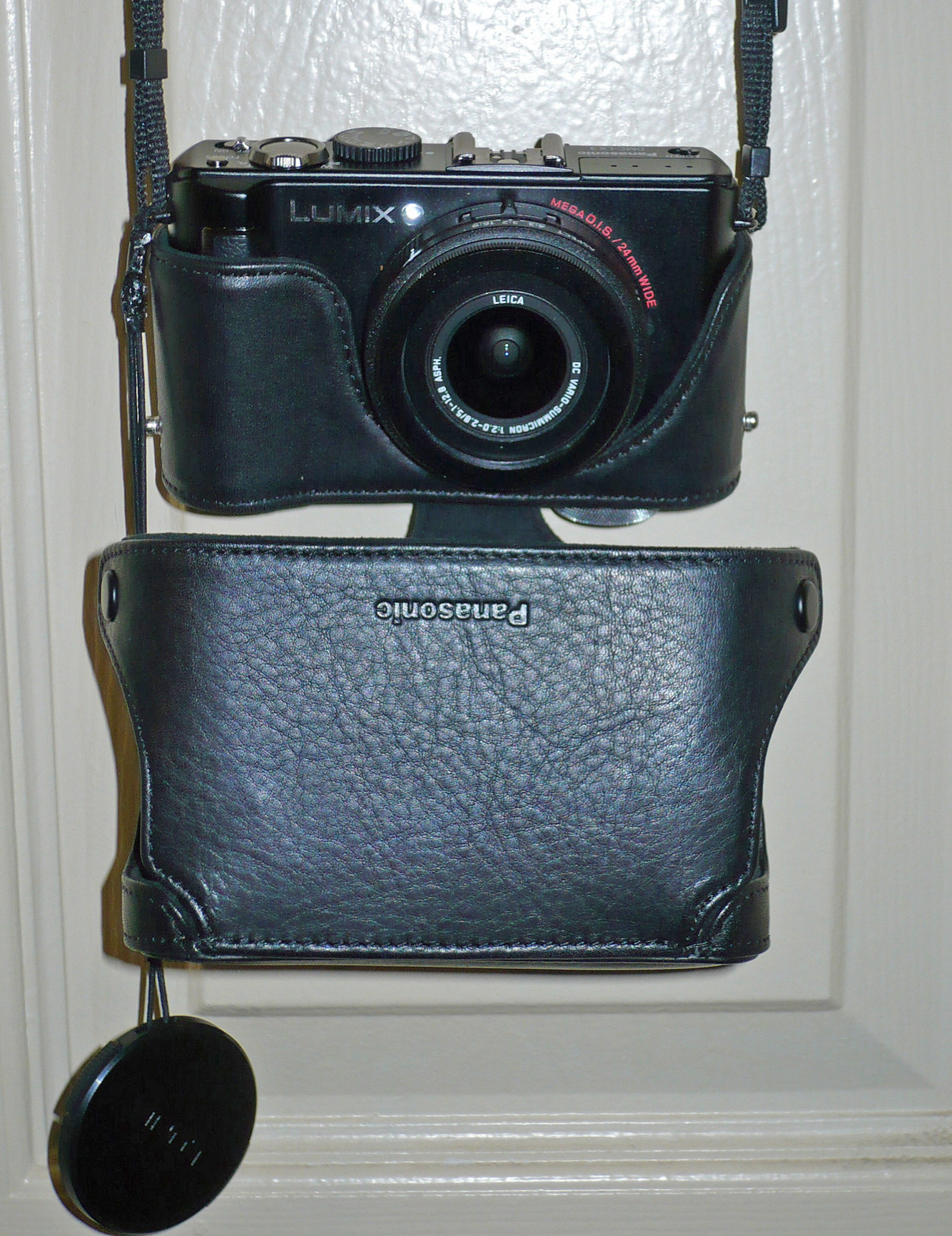
LUMIX LX3 with PANASONIC leather case

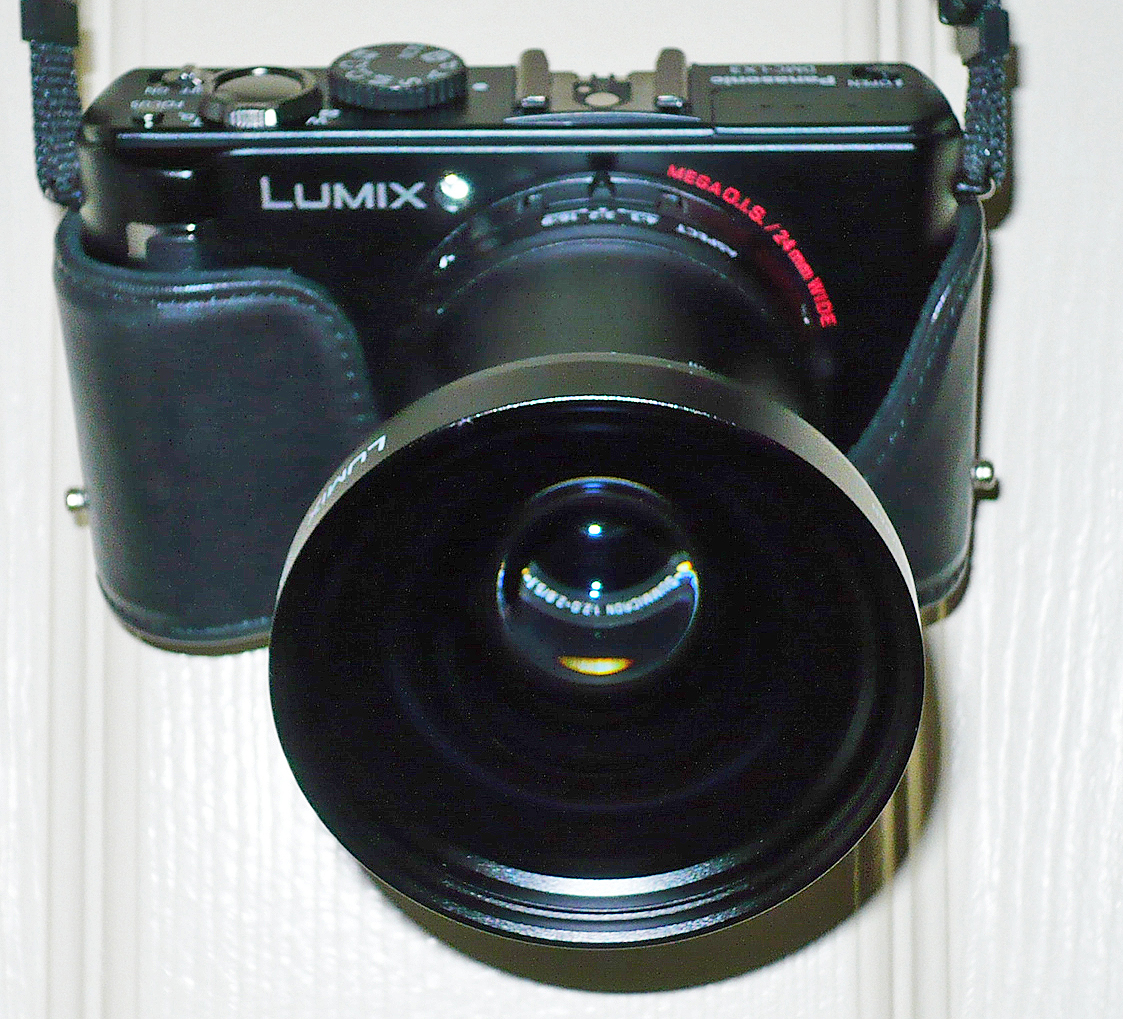
LUMIX LX3 with DMW LW46 18mm wide angle converter lens

The Panasonic Lumix DMC-LX3, or LX3, is a high-end compact "point and shoot" camera launched by Panasonic in late 2008 to succeed the Lumix LX2.

== Features ==
The LX3 has:.

- High-Sensitivity 1/1.63-inch CCD 10.1 Megapixels and Venus Engine IV up to ISO3200 at Full Resolution.
- 24 mm Wide Angle f/2.0–2.8 LEICA DC VARIO-SUMMICRON Lens with 2.5x Optical Zoom.
- Optional full Manual Operation.
- HD Motion Images and HD Output.
- 3.0-inch (460,000-dot) 3:2 Ratio LCD.
- "Intelligent Auto Mode" with AF Tracking.

== Accessories ==
- DMW LW46 wide angle conversion lens, 35 mm equivalent 18 mm.
- Panasonic genuine leather case

== Similar cameras ==
Similar high-end compact cameras are the LX3's sister camera, the Leica D-Lux 4, the Canon PowerShot S90, and the Samsung TL500/EX1. A remarkable quality of the LX3 vs. the S90 is that the aperture of the LX3 only gradually, steadily narrows from 2.0 to 2.8, whereas that for the S90 quickly narrows. (And in later versions, the LX5 retained this gradual narrowing through the extended range (24-90 equiv.); the LX7 retained the extended range and gradual aperture narrowing while opening a full stop wider (1.4 - 2.3!!).)

=== Leica D-Lux 4 ===
The Leica D-Lux 4 is very similar to the LX3, sharing most of the design and the mechanical components. The main difference is the more pronounced grip on the LX3, the firmware which processes the JPG files in warmer hues on the D-Lux4 and the fact that D-Lux4 comes bundled with Capture One image processing software.

== Upgrades ==
Panasonic has continued to improve the firmware. The v. 2.1 firmware claims improved performance, a 20% improvement in autofocus speed, and new features such as a 1:1 aspect ratio and focus resume.

On July 30, 2010, Panasonic released another firmware update for the LX3. The stated reason behind the update is 'Optimization of software processing', with an additional comment stating 'Change in software version has no effect on camera performance'.

Panasonic launched the successor to the LX3, the LX5, on 21 July 2010.

The latest model features a revised sensor, longer zoom range and improved control layout without fundamentally changing the existing model's formula. It offers a more flexible 24–90 mm equivalent lens with a bright f/2.0–3.3 maximum aperture range and a comparatively large 10MP sensor in a small body. The body itself is barely changed compared to the LX3 – gaining an improved hand grip, clickable control dial, direct movie record button and a 1:1 position on the aspect ratio slider. Most significantly it gains a connector to add the DMW-LVF1 electronic viewfinder originally launched with the GF1. Other than this, the LX5 gains the AVCHD Lite format for its 720p video, and its image stabilization is branded with the company's latest 'Power O.I.S' designation.

== See also ==
- List of digital cameras with CCD sensors
