= LX7 =

LX7 may refer to:

- Panasonic Lumix DMC-LX7, a digital camera
- RDD Enterprises LX7, a homebuilt aircraft
