= M600 =

M600 may refer to:

- Eten M600, a mobile telephone and PDA
- Noble M600, a handbuilt British supercar
- Orange M600, a mobile telephone and PDA
- Sony Ericsson M600, a mobile telephone
- M-600, the Syria-manufactured version of the Iranian Fateh-110 missile
- The Piper M600 single-engine light airplane
- DJI Matrice 600, a Chinese industrial drone
