= Zoom-lens reflex camera =

Olympus IS50QD

A zoom-lens reflex (ZLR) camera is a low-end single-lens reflex (SLR) camera having an integrated zoom lens rather than the interchangeable lenses found on other SLR cameras.

The term was coined by Olympus for the IS-series film cameras. Olympus also applied the designation to the D-500L & D-600L in press releases carried by PR Newswire. Olympus now refers to these cameras, along with the D-620L, simply as "Digital cameras".

For the Olympus E-10 and E-20 digital cameras, while some journalists continued to apply the term ZLR, Olympus themselves reverted to using the term SLR.

== See also ==
- Single-lens reflex camera
- Digital single-lens reflex camera
- Electronic viewfinder
