= Fujifilm X10 =

2011 digital compact camera

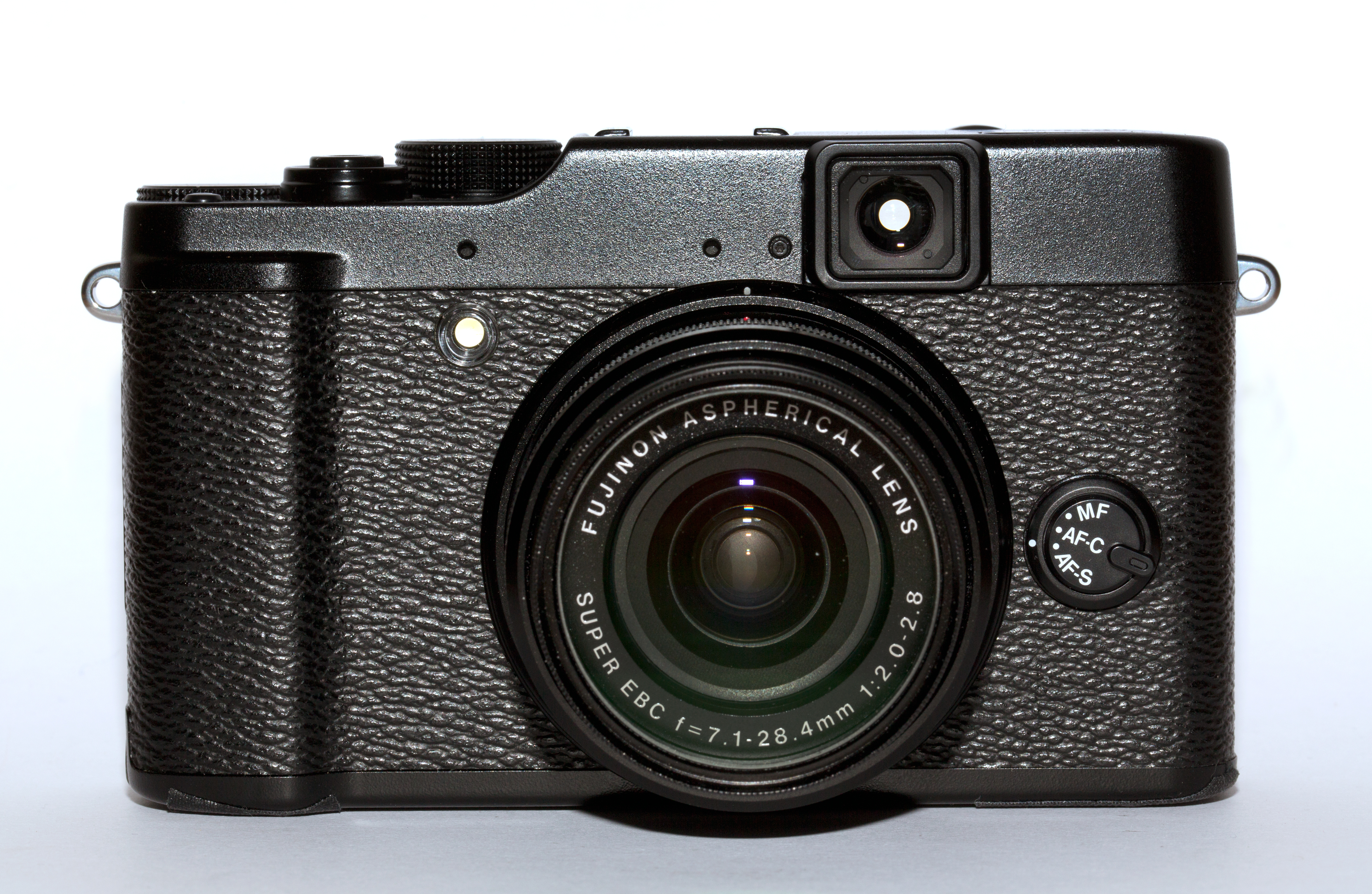

Overview
- Maker: Fujifilm

Lens
- Lens: 28-112mm equivalent
- F-numbers: f/2.0-f/2.8 at the widest

Sensor/medium
- Sensor type: EXRCMOS
- Sensor size: 8.8 x 6.6 mm (2/3 inch type)
- Maximum resolution: 4000 x 3000 (12 megapixels)
- Film speed: 100-12800
- Recording medium: SD, SDHC or SDXC memory card

Focusing
- Focus areas: 49 focus points

Shutter
- Shutter speeds: 1/4000s to 30s
- Continuous shooting: 10 frames per second

Viewfinder
- Frame coverage: 85%

Image processing
- Image processor: EXR
- White balance: Yes

General
- LCD screen: 2.8 inches with 460,000 dots
- Dimensions: 117 x 70 x 57 mm (4.61 x 2.76 x 2.24 inches)
- Weight: 350 g (12 oz) including battery

References
- Specifications

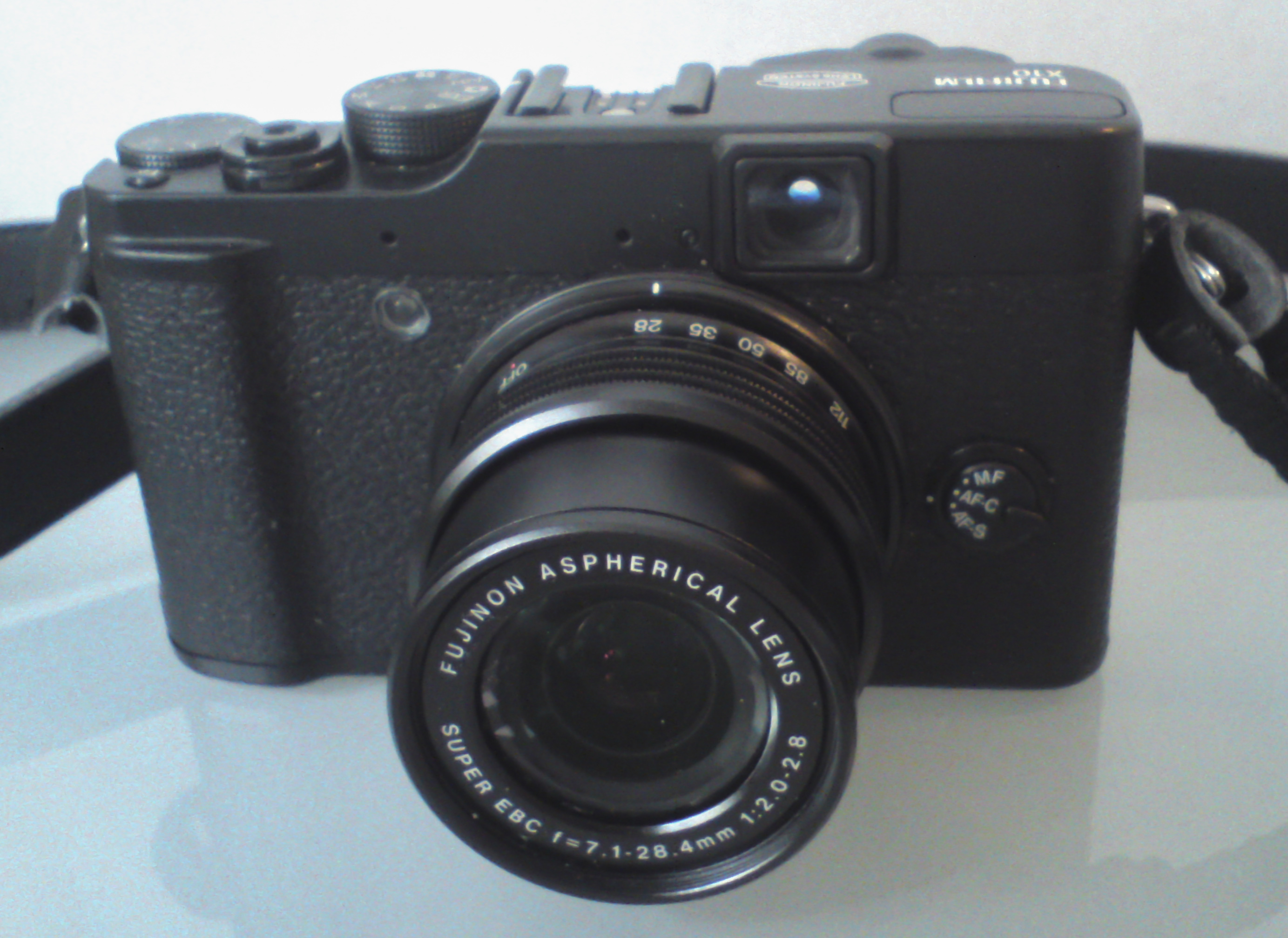
Fujifilm X10

The Fujifilm X10 is a 2/3 sensor digital compact camera announced by Fujifilm on September 1, 2011. At the time of its release, it competed most closely with the Panasonic Lumix DMC-LX5, Olympus XZ-1, Canon PowerShot G1 X and Sony Cyber-shot DSC-RX100, and was subsequently named a 2013 iF product design award recipient.

The X10 was noted for its 2/3 inch type sensor, "twice as large as those used in almost all traditional compacts" at the time, and its EXR colour filter layout, allowing either greater dynamic range or lower noise to be recorded in an image of reduced resolution, as well as a conventional full resolution image. The X10's optical tunnel viewfinder zooms in synchrony with the 28-112mm equivalent, f/2.0 to f/2.8 maximum aperture zoom lens that was described as "impressively bright".

The X10 was the first of a new line of compact cameras from Fujifilm, with the letter X and two digits in the product name. Its immediate successor was the Fujifilm X20 in January 2013.

== Construction ==
The X10 has magnesium alloy top and bottom plates, and a mechanical zoom ring. According to Fujifilm, the fact that 1mm rather than 0.8mm aluminium sheets were chosen for the front and rear makes the camera "nearly twice as rigid as ordinary cameras". Besides controlling zoom, the zoom ring is also used to power on the camera.

== General reception ==
Imaging-Resource noted that "the zoom lens obscures the lower right quadrant of the optical viewfinder", from about 45mm equivalent focal length to 28mm wide angle. Additionally, the user's index finger may appear in the viewfinder while zooming. In spite of this, Imaging-Resource expressed a preference for the zoom ring experience, and TechCrunch referred to the viewfinder shading as "more quaint than problematic".

PC Magazine bemoaned the absence of visual focus confirmation, and lack of an ability to have auditory focus confirmation without also playing an artificial shutter sound clip. However, they also wrote that the camera "nailed the focus quickly and consistently", and rated the camera 4.0 out of 5.

== Conditional product recall: the "white orbs" ==
At least some early-release X10 specimens had a flaw that could make "white orbs" appear in images. As a first response, in early February 2012, Fujifilm released a firmware update to mitigate the issue, but this was not successful. Fujifilm then also modified the sensor and in early March announced a sensor replacement program for any cameras affected by the issue. Tech publication DPReview judged the replacement to successfully address the problem, and Fujifilm reported that complaints quickly diminished after the free replacement program was launched.

== See also ==
- List of retro-style digital cameras

| Type | Lens | 2011 | 2012 | 2013 | 2014 | 2015 | 2016 | 2017 | 2018 | 2019 | 2020 | 2021 | 2022 | 2023 | 2024 | 2025 |
| MILC | G-mount; Medium format sensor | | | | | | | GFX 50S ^{F} ^{T} | | | | | GFX 50S II ^{F} ^{T} | | | |
| MILC | G-mount; Medium format sensor | | | | | | | | | GFX 50R ^{F} ^{T} | | | | | | |
| MILC | G-mount; Medium format sensor | | | | | | | | | | GFX 100 ^{F} ^{T} | | | | | GFX 100 II ^{F} ^{T} |
| MILC | G-mount; Medium format sensor | | | | | | | | | | | GFX 100 IR ^{F} ^{T} | | | | |
| MILC | G-mount; Medium format sensor | | | | | | | | | | | GFX 100S ^{F} ^{T} | | | | GFX 100S II^{F} ^{T} |
| MILC | G-mount; Medium format sensor | | | | | | | | | | | | | | | GFX Eterna 55^{F} ^{T} |
| MILC | Prime lens Medium format sensor | | | | | | | | | | | | | | | GFX 100RF ^{F} ^{T} |
| MILC | X-mount; APS-C sensor | | X-Pro1 | | | | X-Pro2 | | | | X-Pro3 ^{f} ^{T} | | | | | |
| MILC | X-mount; APS-C sensor | | | | | | | | X-H1 ^{F} ^{T} | | | | | X-H2 ^{A} ^{T} | | |
| MILC | X-mount; APS-C sensor | | | | | | | | | | | | | X-H2S ^{A} ^{T} | | |
| MILC | X-mount; APS-C sensor | | | | | | | | | | | X-S10 ^{A} ^{T} | | | X-S20 ^{A} ^{T} | |
| MILC | X-mount; APS-C sensor | | | | X-T1 ^{f} | | | X-T2 ^{F} | | X-T3 ^{F} ^{T} | | X-T4 ^{A} ^{T} | | X-T5 ^{F} ^{T} | | |
| MILC | X-mount; APS-C sensor | | | | | | X-T10 ^{f} | X-T20 ^{f} ^{T} | | X-T30 ^{f} ^{T} | | | X-T30 II ^{f} ^{T} | | | X-T50 ^{f} ^{T} |
| MILC | X-mount; APS-C sensor | | | | | | | | | _{15} X-T100 ^{F} ^{T} | X-T200 ^{A} ^{T} | | | | | |
| MILC | X-mount; APS-C sensor | | | X-E1 | X-E2 | | X-E2s | | X-E3 ^{T} | | | X-E4 ^{f} ^{T} | | | | X-E5 ^{f} ^{T} |
| MILC | X-mount; APS-C sensor | | | | X-M1 ^{f} | | | | | | | | | | | X-M5 ^{A} ^{T} |
| MILC | X-mount; APS-C sensor | | | | X-A1 ^{f} | X-A2 ^{f} | | X-A3 ^{f} ^{T} | _{15} X-A5 ^{f} ^{T} | | X-A7 ^{A} ^{T} | | | | | |
| MILC | X-mount; APS-C sensor | | | | | | | X-A10 ^{f} | X-A20 ^{f} ^{T} | | | | | | | |
| Compact | Prime lens APS-C sensor | X100 | | X100S | | X100T | | X100F | | | X100V ^{f} ^{T} | | | | X100VI ^{f} ^{T} | |
| Compact | Prime lens APS-C sensor | | | | | | X70 ^{f} ^{T} | | | XF10 ^{T} | | | | | | |
| Compact | Prime lens 1" sensor | | | | | | | | | | | | | | | X half ^{T} |
| Compact | Zoom lens^{2}/_{3}" sensor | | X10 | X20 | | X30 ^{f} | | | | | | | | | | |
| Compact | Zoom lens^{2}/_{3}" sensor | | | | XQ1 | XQ2 | | | | | | | | | | |
| Compact | Zoom lens^{2}/_{3}" sensor | | | XF1 | | | | | | | | | | | | |
| Bridge | ^{2}/_{3}" sensor | | X-S1 ^{f} | | | | | | | | | | | | | |
| Type | Lens | | | | | | | | | | | | | | | |
| Type | Lens | 2011 | 2012 | 2013 | 2014 | 2015 | 2016 | 2017 | 2018 | 2019 | 2020 | 2021 | 2022 | 2023 | 2024 | 2025 |
