= Nikon Coolpix P7100 =

Digital camera model

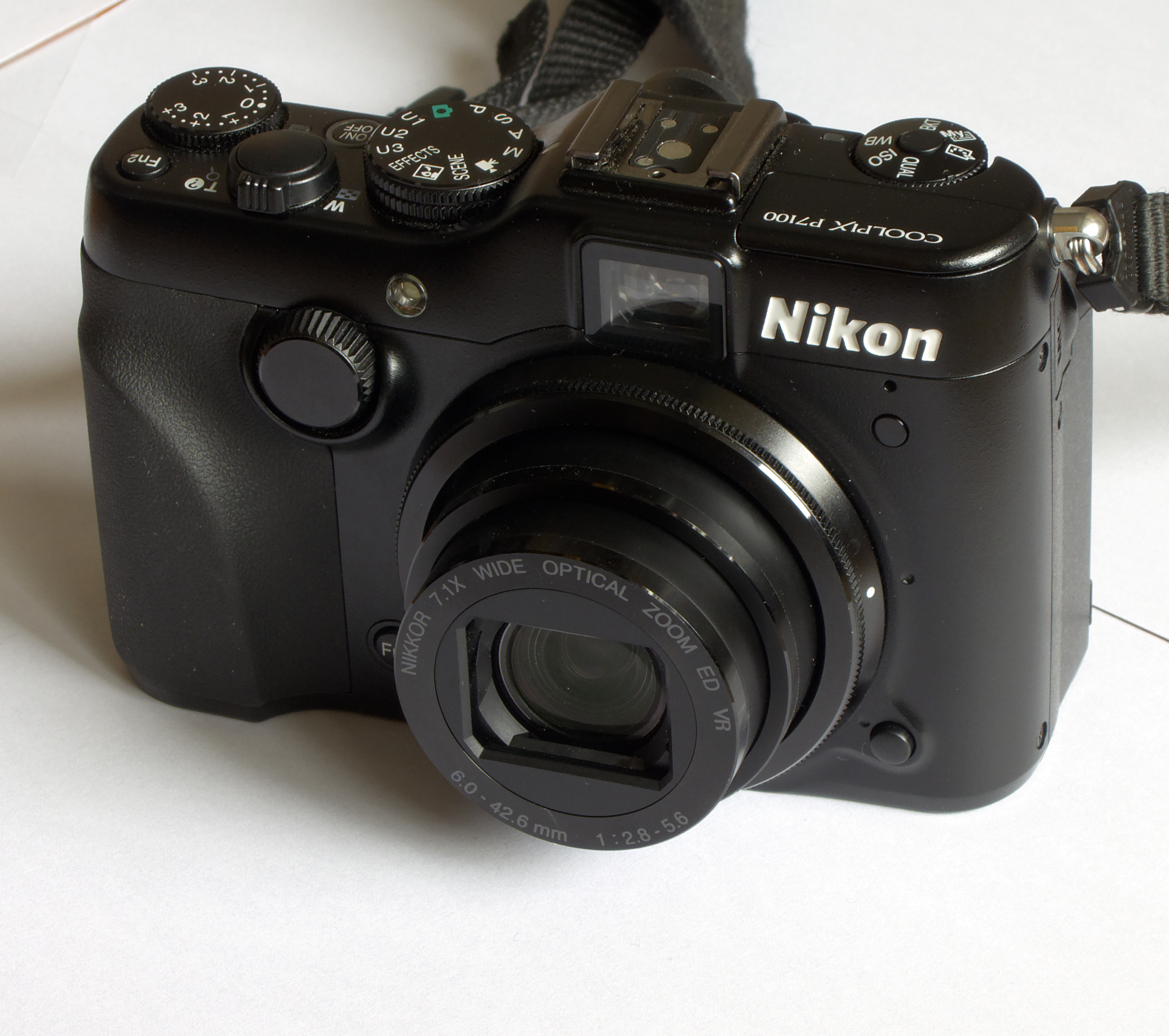

Overview
- Maker: Nikon

Lens
- Lens: 28-200mm equivalent
- F-numbers: f/2.8-f/5.6 at the widest

Sensor/medium
- Sensor type: CCD
- Sensor size: 7.44 x 5.58mm (1/1.7 inch type)
- Maximum resolution: 3648 x 2736 (10 megapixels)
- Film speed: 100-3200 (6400 expanded)
- Recording medium: SD, SDHC or SDXC memory card

Focusing
- Focus areas: 99 focus points

Shutter
- Shutter speeds: 1/4000s to 60s

Viewfinder
- Frame coverage: 80%

Image processing
- Image processor: Expeed C2
- White balance: Yes

General
- LCD screen: 3 inches with 921,000 dots
- Dimensions: 116 x 77 x 48mm (4.57 x 3.03 x 1.89 inches)
- Weight: 395 g (14 oz) including battery

The Nikon Coolpix P7100 is a digital compact camera announced by Nikon on August 24, 2011, successor to the Nikon Coolpix P7000. It differs from the earlier model by an extra control dial, flip-out screen and improved responsiveness.

== See also ==
- List of digital cameras with CCD sensors
