= List of digital cameras with CCD sensors =

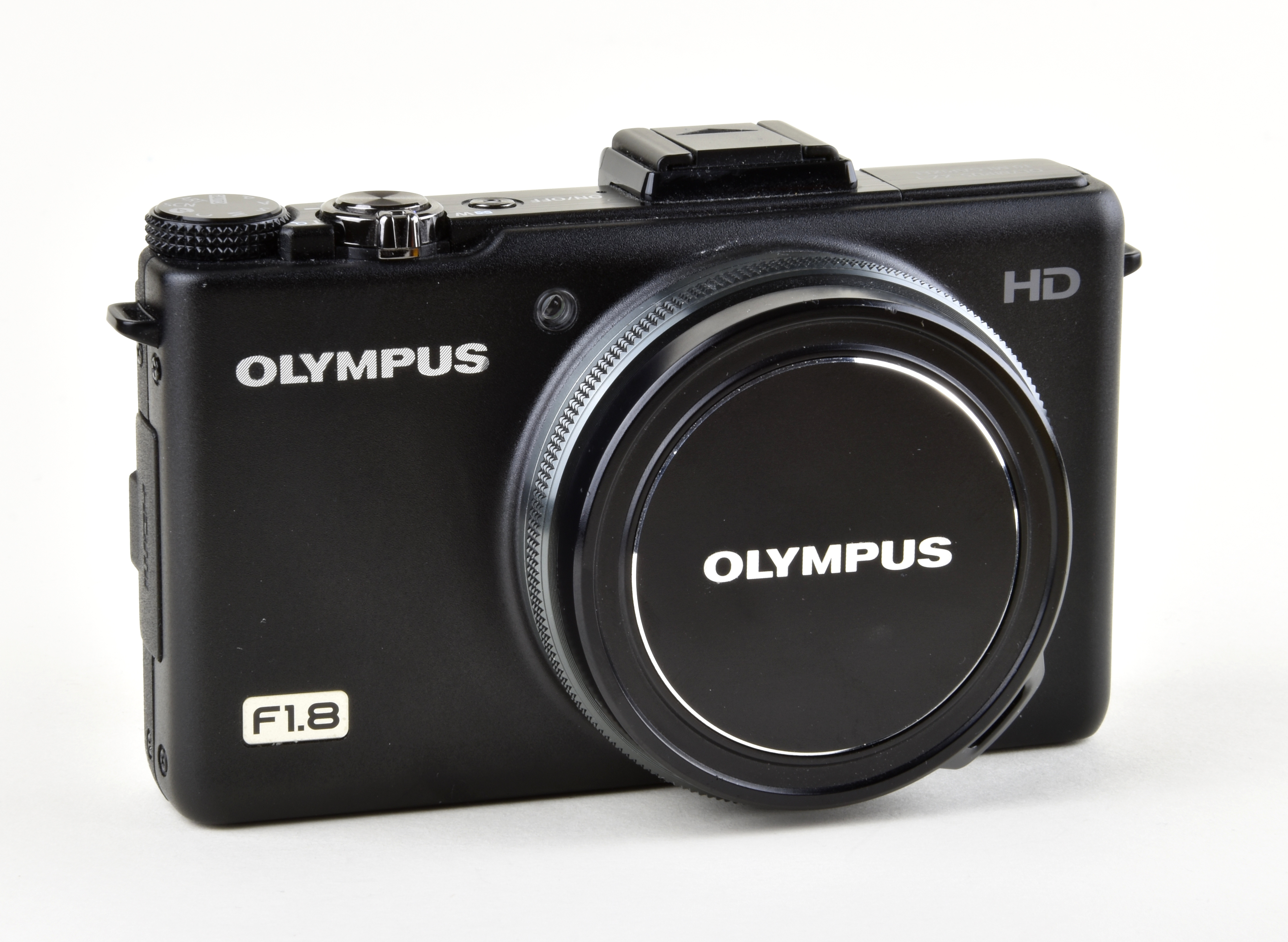
Olympus XZ-1

There has been renewed interest in vintage digital cameras, also known as digicams, due to their ability to take photos with a particular nostalgic look without the expense of analog film. This trend coincides with the resurgence of other early digital and late analog technologies, such as camcorders, film photography, vinyl records, and turntables.

This is a list of digicams that contain a 1/1.7″ CCD sensor or larger, include a fixed lens, and support SDHC memory cards and one or more of the following: SDXC memory cards, raw image format capture, and AA or AAA batteries. (Note: There is no model with a CCD image sensor that is known to support all three.) These are features that help make an old camera easy to use today.

Model	Sensor size	Optical zoom	Focal length (Note: 35mm equivalent.)		Aperture		Pixel count	SDXC	Raw	AA/ AAA	Release year
Model	Sensor size	Optical zoom	Wide	Tele	Wide	Tele	Pixel count	SDXC	Raw	AA/ AAA	Release year
Olympus XZ-1	1/1.63″	4.0×	28mm	112mm	f/1.8	f/2.5	10 MP	Yes	Yes	No	2010
Panasonic Lumix LX5 (Note: Rebadged by Leica as the D-Lux 5.)	1/1.63″	3.8×	24mm	90mm	f/2.0	f/3.3	10 MP	Yes	Yes	No	2010
Panasonic Lumix LX3 (Note: Rebadged by Leica as the D-Lux 4.)	1/1.63″	2.5×	24mm	60mm	f/2.0	f/2.8	10 MP	No	Yes	No	2008
Panasonic Lumix LX2 (Note: Rebadged by Leica as the D-Lux 3.)	1/1.65″	4.0×	28mm	112mm	f/2.8	f/4.9	10 MP	No	Yes	No	2006
Panasonic Lumix LX1 (Note: Rebadged by Leica as the D-Lux 2.)	1/1.65″	4.0×	28mm	112mm	f/2.8	f/4.9	8 MP	No	Yes	No	2005
Canon PowerShot S200	1/1.70″	5.0×	24mm	120mm	f/2.0	f/5.9	10 MP	Yes	No	No	2014
Canon PowerShot S95	1/1.70″	3.8×	28mm	105mm	f/2.0	f/4.9	10 MP	Yes	Yes	No	2010
Canon PowerShot S90	1/1.70″	3.8×	28mm	105mm	f/2.0	f/4.9	10 MP	Yes	Yes	No	2009
Canon PowerShot G12	1/1.70″	5.0×	28mm	140mm	f/2.8	f/4.5	10 MP	Yes	Yes	No	2010
Canon PowerShot G11	1/1.70″	5.0×	28mm	140mm	f/2.8	f/4.5	10 MP	No	Yes	No	2009
Canon PowerShot G10	1/1.70″	5.0×	28mm	140mm	f/2.8	f/4.5	15 MP	No	Yes	No	2008
Canon PowerShot G9	1/1.70″	6.0×	35mm	210mm	f/2.8	f/4.8	12 MP	No	Yes	No	2007
Canon PowerShot A650 IS	1/1.70″	6.0×	35mm	210mm	f/2.8	f/4.8	12 MP	No	No	Yes (Note: Can be powered by 4 AA batteries.)	2007
Nikon Coolpix P7100	1/1.70″	7.1×	28mm	200mm	f/2.8	f/5.6	10 MP	Yes	Yes	No	2011
Nikon Coolpix P7000	1/1.70″	7.1×	28mm	200mm	f/2.8	f/5.6	10 MP	Yes	Yes	No	2010
Samsung TL500 (Note: Known as the Samsung EX1 in Europe.)	1/1.70″	3.0×	24mm	72mm	f/1.8	f/2.4	10 MP	No	Yes	No	2010
Ricoh Caplio GX200	1/1.70″	3.0×	24mm	72mm	f/2.5	f/4.4	12 MP	No	Yes	Yes (Note: Can be powered by 2 AAA batteries.)	2008
Ricoh GR Digital IV	1/1.70″	1.0×	28mm		f/1.9		10 MP	No	Yes	Yes	2011
Ricoh GR Digital III	1/1.70″	1.0×	28mm		f/1.9		10 MP	No	Yes	Yes	2009

Notably, no Fujifilm Super CCD digicams qualify, because none support SDXC, raw capture, or AA/AAA batteries. Arguably their best models ever released, such as the FinePix F31fd, only support xD memory cards, which are now obsolete.

== Rationale for criteria ==
=== Fixed lens ===
Although the term “digicam” originated as a syllabic abbreviation for “digital camera”, it is now used primarily to refer to an old compact digital camera or, in other words, a discontinued point-and-shoot camera with a fixed lens. Digicams emphasize portability and ease of use, and they often include a built-in flash.

=== 1/1.7″ CCD sensor or larger ===
CMOS sensors have entirely replaced CCD sensors in recent consumer digital cameras due to cost effectiveness and high ISO performance. However, in good lighting conditions, many people find that the CCD sensors in digicams yield a more pleasing color rendition than CMOS sensors. Some liken CCD to slide film (also known as positive film) and CMOS to negative film.

While there were larger CCD sensors made for interchangeable-lens cameras, such as the Leica M9, CCD sensors in fixed-lens cameras maxed out at 2/3″ (1/1.5″). Premium compact cameras of the time contained sensors around 1/1.7″ in size, whereas entry-level models used 1/2.3″ sensors or smaller.

=== SDHC and SDXC cards ===
Early digital cameras used a variety of formats for storage. Eventually SD cards won the format war, and they are still widely used and readily available. However, the original SD format maxes out at 2GB and is now rare. Cards today far exceed that by using one of two format extensions: SDHC, which maxes out at 32 GB, or SDXC, which maxes out at 2 TB. SDXC support is more future-proof, but SDHC cards are still common and inexpensive. Support for the newer formats is important, because memory card slots are not usually forward compatible.

=== Raw image format ===
While the appeal of digicams stems from the ability of obtain pleasing results with a nostalgic look straight out of camera, capturing in a raw format maximizes the ability to edit an image to one's taste or recover details (such as highlights and shadows) that might otherwise be lost in the JPEG version, especially given the low dynamic range of these small-sensor cameras.

=== AA or AAA batteries ===
New consumer digital cameras with CCD sensors stopped being released in the early 2010s, and the few that offered USB charging only supported it via a non-standard cable. Proprietary cables, chargers, and batteries can be difficult to come by, especially when discontinued, which makes support for standard AA or AAA batteries (especially rechargeable NiMH cells) a desirable feature.

== Larger CCD sensors ==
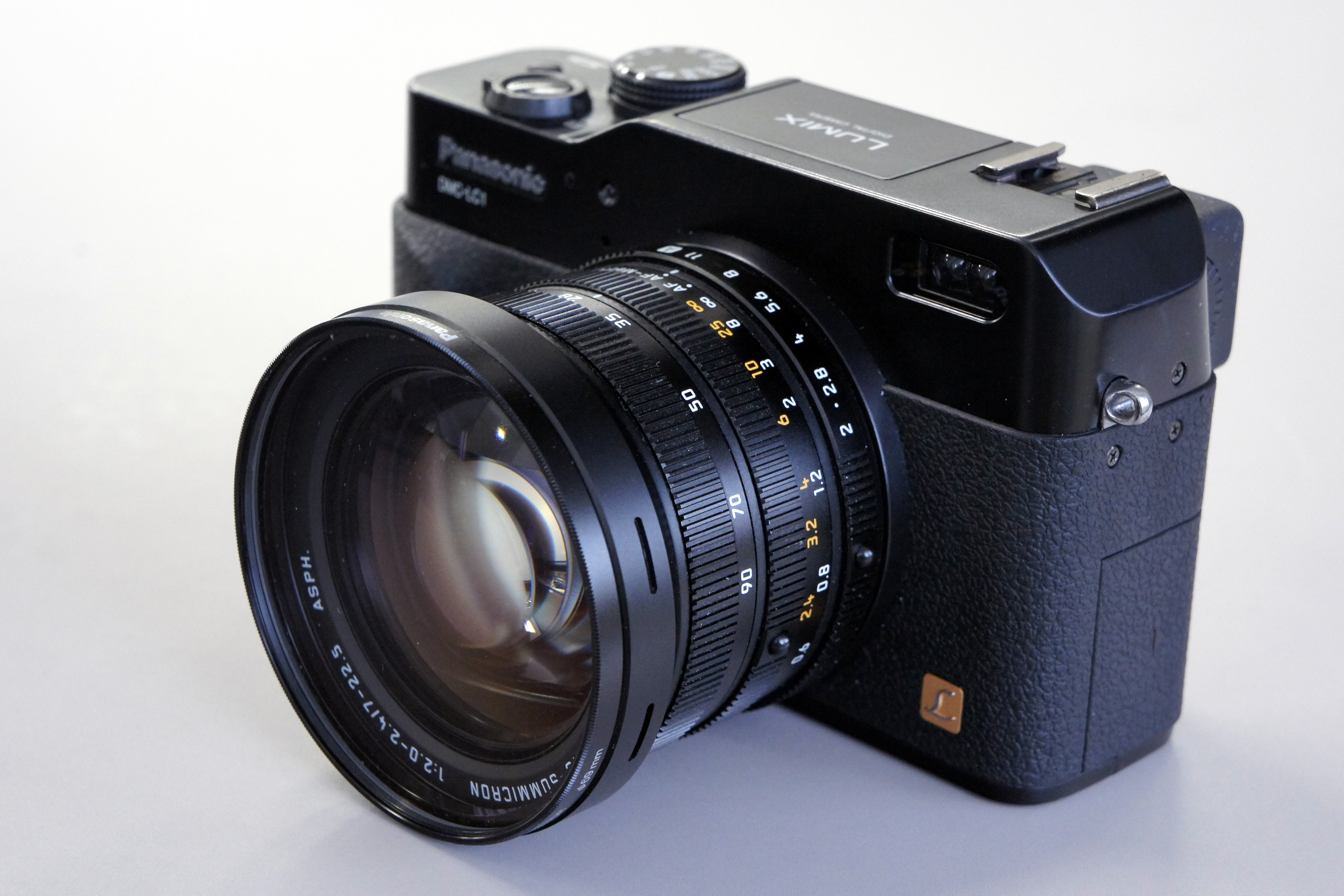
Panasonic Lumix LC1

The following digicams include a 2/3-inch CCD sensor, a fixed lens with a maximum aperture of f/2.4 or wider, and SD or CompactFlash (CF) memory card slots. However, none of them support SDHC/SDXC memory cards. Only the Olympus E-10/E-20 support AA batteries, none of the others accept AA/AAA batteries.

Even larger CCD sensors were only included in interchangeable-lens cameras, such as the Canon 1D, Nikon D60, and Leica M9. Nearly all such models were more expensive and less beginner-friendly than the point-and-shoot cameras listed here.

Model	Sensor size	Optical zoom	Focal length		Aperture		Pixel count	SD	CF	Raw	Release year
Model	Sensor size	Optical zoom	Wide	Tele	Wide	Tele	Pixel count	SD	CF	Raw	Release year
Leica Digilux 2	2/3″	3.2×	28mm	90mm	f/2.0	f/2.4	5 MP	Yes	No	Yes	2004
Panasonic Lumix LC1	2/3″	3.2×	28mm	90mm	f/2.0	f/2.4	5 MP	Yes	No	Yes	2004
Samsung Pro815	2/3″	15.0×	28mm	420mm	f/2.2	f/4.6	8 MP	No	Yes	Yes	2005
Sony Cyber-shot F828	2/3″	7.1×	28mm	200mm	f/2.0	f/2.8	8 MP	No	Yes	Yes	2003
Canon Powershot Pro1	2/3″	7.1×	28mm	200mm	f/2.4	f/3.5	8 MP	No	Yes	Yes	2004
Olympus C-8080	2/3″	5.0×	28mm	140mm	f/2.4	f/3.5	8 MP	No	Yes	Yes	2004
Olympus E-20	2/3″	4.0×	35mm	140mm	f/2.0	f/2.4	5 MP	No	Yes	Yes	2001
Olympus E-10	2/3″	4.0×	35mm	140mm	f/2.0	f/2.4	4 MP	No	Yes	Yes	2000
Konica Minolta Dimage A2	2/3″	7.1×	28mm	200mm	f/2.8	f/3.5	8 MP	No	Yes	Yes	2004
Nikon Coolpix 8700	2/3″	8.0×	35mm	280mm	f/2.8	f/4.2	8 MP	No	Yes	Yes	2004

== Smaller CCD sensors ==
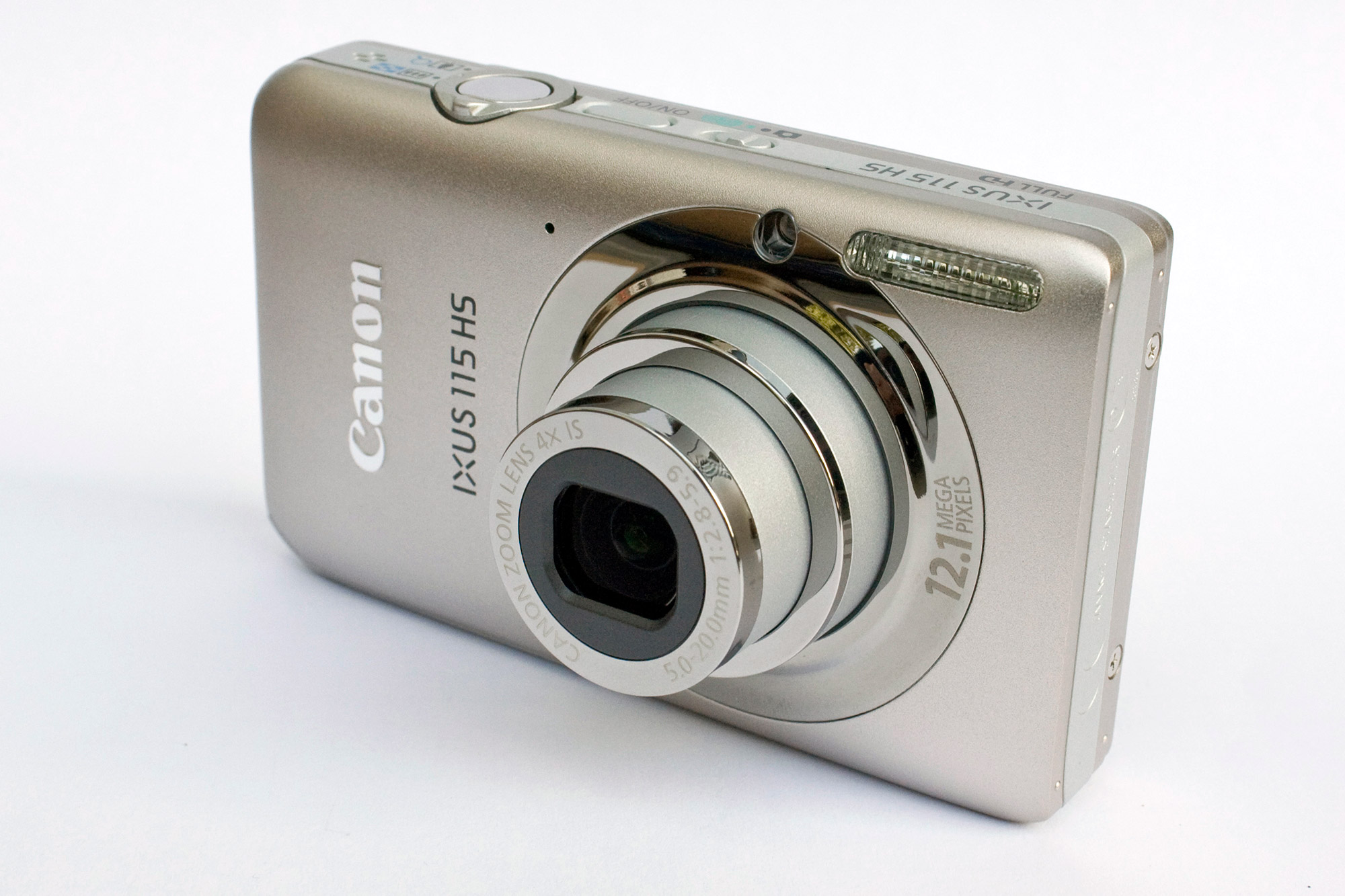
Canon IXUS 115

There are hundreds of digicam models — the most popular of which are from the Canon PowerShot ELPH, IXUS, and IXY series — that contain a smaller CCD sensor and support SDXC memory cards. Unfortunately none of them support USB charging. However several dozen, such as the Nikon Coolpix A10, do support AA batteries.

== See also ==
- List of retro-style digital cameras
- List of large sensor fixed-lens cameras
