= Panasonic Lumix DMC-LX5 =

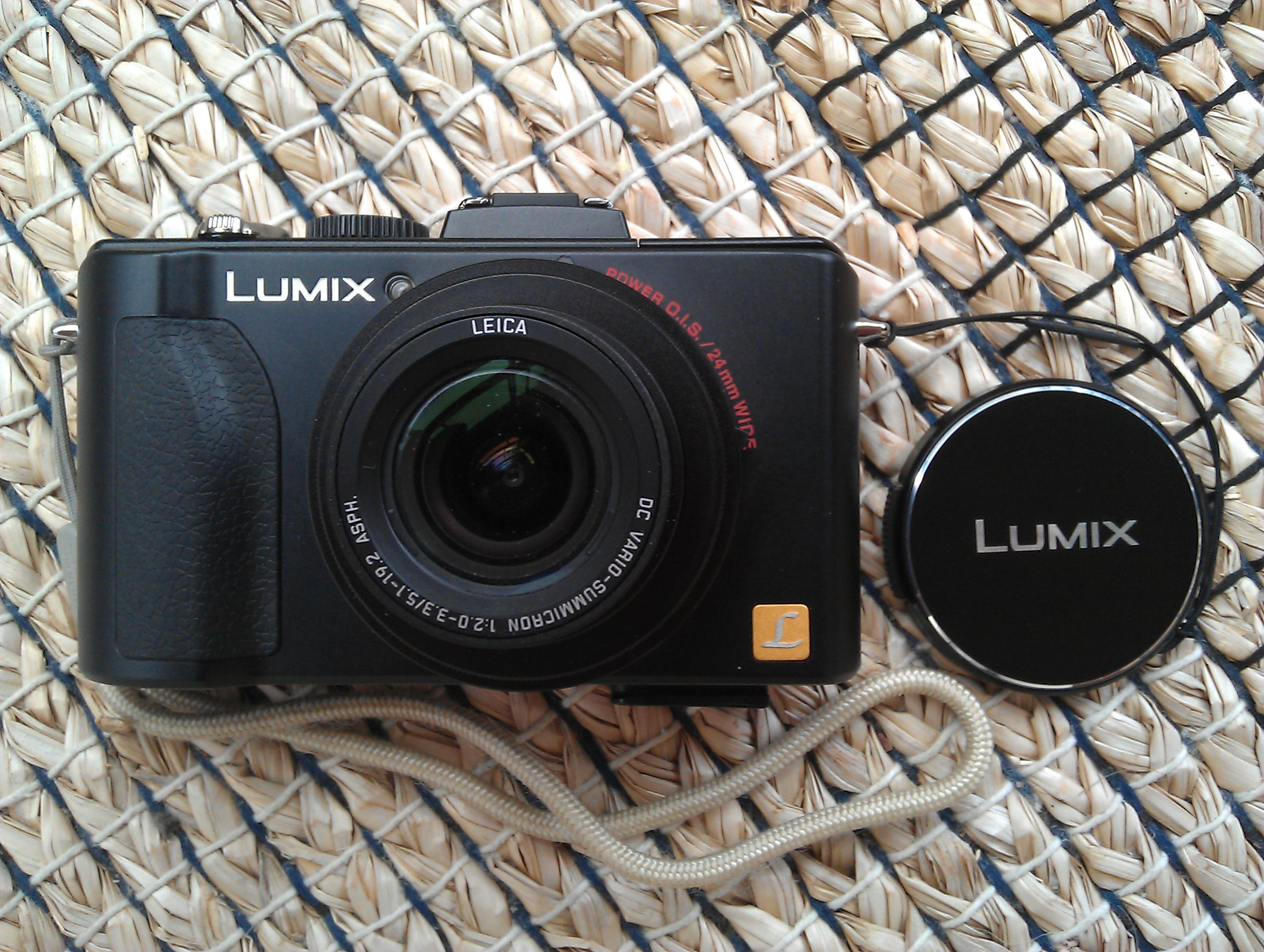

Overview
- Maker: Panasonic Holdings Corporation
- Type: Digital Camera

Lens
- Lens: 5.1–19.2 mm (35mm equivalent: 24–90 mm) f/2.0–3.3

Sensor/medium
- Sensor: 1/1.63" CCD
- Maximum resolution: 3648 × 2736 (10.1 megapixels)
- Film speed: ISO 80, 100, 200, 400, 800, 1600, 3200, High Sensitivity (1600 - 12800)
- Storage media: Secure Digital Card (SD/SDHC/SDXC)

Focusing
- Focus modes: Normal / Macro, Quick AF, Continuous AF, AF / MF Switchable, Manual Focus (Jog dial), One Shot AF, AF Area Select, AF Tracking
- Focus areas: Face, AF Tracking, Multi (23-area), 1-area (flexible / scalable)

Exposure/metering
- Exposure modes: Program AE, Aperture Priority AE, Shutter Priority AE, Manual, Program Shift (Program AE Mode)
- Metering modes: Intelligent Multiple, Center Weighted, Spot

Flash
- Flash: Internal

Shutter
- Shutter speed range: 1/4000 sec – 60 sec
- Continuous shooting: 2.5 fps for 3 frames (Fine), 5 frames (Standard)

Image processing
- White balance: Auto, Daylight, Cloudy, Shade, Flash, Halogen, Color Temperature, White Set 1, White Set 2, White Balance Adjustment

General
- LCD screen: 3.0" Purecolor LCD II (TFT) approx. 460,000 dots
- Battery: Li-ion Battery Pack (3.6 V, 1250 mAh)
- Dimensions: 109.7×65.5×43.0 mm (4.32×2.58×1.69 in) (W * H * D)
- Weight: 271 g (9.6 oz)
- Made in: Japan

The Panasonic Lumix DMC-LX5, or LX5, is a high-end compact "point and shoot" camera launched by Panasonic in 2010 to succeed the LX3.

The camera is also sold by Leica under the name D-Lux 5 (which has its own exterior design and firmware implementation).

Its successor is the new Panasonic Lumix DMC-LX7 with CMOS sensor but still maintaining the same resolution (10.1MP).

== Features ==
The LX5 has:.

- High sensitivity 1/1.63-inch CCD (10.1 megapixels)
- 24 – 90 mm (35 mm equivalent) ultra wide-angle f/2.0 - 3.3 LEICA DC VARIO-SUMMICRON lens (3.8x optical zoom)
- POWER O.I.S (optical image stabilizer)
- 3.0-inch (460,000-dot) LCD
- Optional full manual operation
- HD 720p30 quality movie clips in AVCHD Lite and Motion JPEG format
- HDMI output

== Accessories ==
- DMW BCJ13 - Battery. Chipped to encourage OEM battery usage. Some 3rd party batteries work, but features like battery level indicator typically do not work.
- DMW-AC5 - AC adapter. Needs DMW-DCC5 to supply power to camera. Port in battery door allows connection to DMW-DCC5.
- DMW-DCC5 - DC Coupler. Replaces battery pack in the camera. Needs DMW-AC5 to work with AC power.
- DMW-LVF1 - External Live Viewfinder (Electronic)
- DMW-VF1 - External Viewfinder. Optical, static
- DMW-LWA52 - Wide Conversion Lens - Needs DMW-LA6
- DMW-LPL52 - Circular PL Filter - Needs DMW-LA6
- DMW-LND52 - Neutral Density Filter - 3 shutter stops - Needs DMW-LA6
- DMW-LMC52 - Lens protectors - Needs DMW-LA6
- DMW-LA6 - Lens adapter. Works with DMW-LW52, DMW-LND52, DMW-LPL52, DMW-LMC52
- RP-CDHM15/RM-CDHM30 - Mini-HDMI to HDMI cables. Hooks up LX5 to HDMI up to 1080i. Only for reviewing pictures/video, not for preview.

== Similar cameras ==
Similar high-end compact cameras ("large" sensor and lens maximum aperture) are the Olympus XZ-1, the Canon PowerShot S95 and the Nikon Coolpix P7000.

== See also ==
- List of digital cameras with CCD sensors
