= Olympus E-10 =

Digital camera model

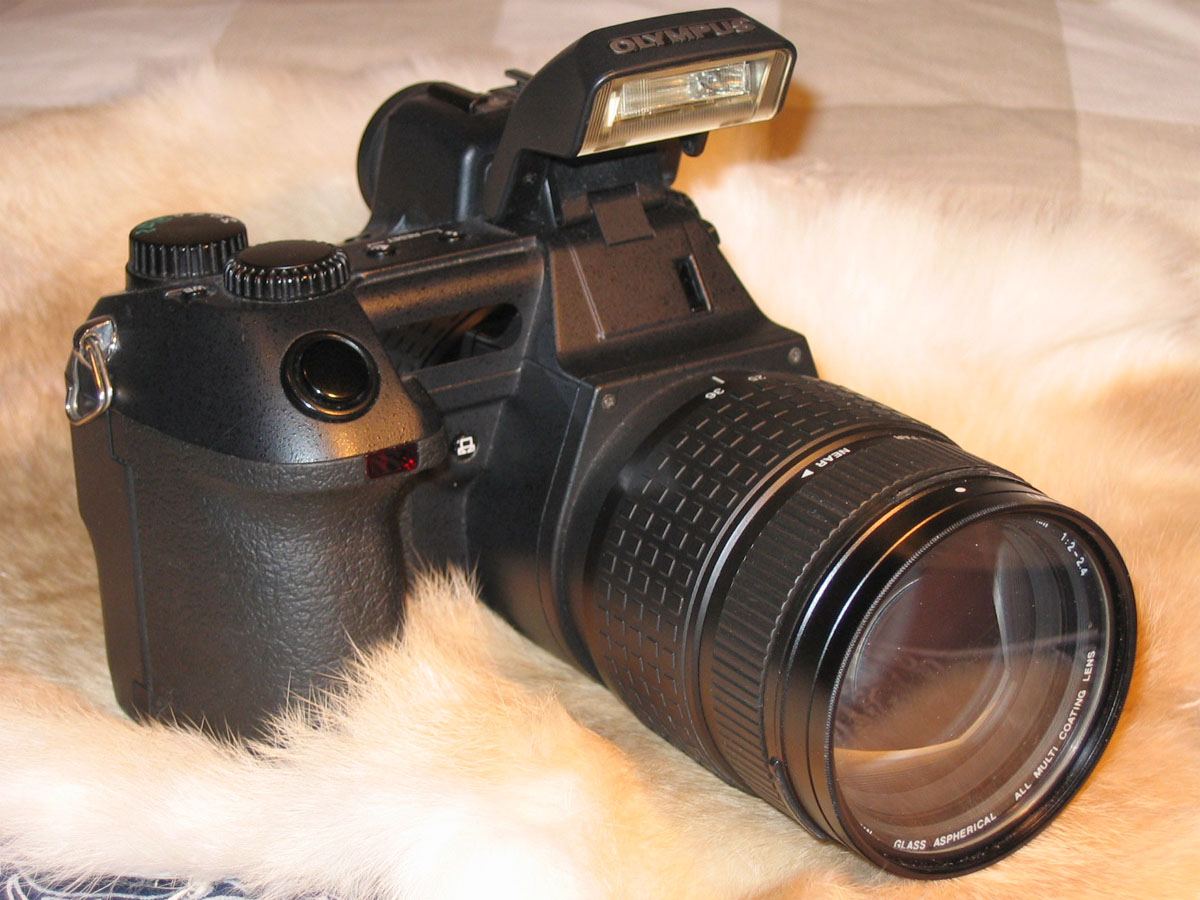

Overview
- Maker: Olympus Corporation
- Type: Bridge

Lens
- Lens: Fixed 35–140mm, f/2–2.4

Sensor/medium
- Sensor: 2/3-inch CCD
- Maximum resolution: 2,240 × 1,680 (4 million)
- Film speed: 80, 160, 320
- Storage media: CompactFlash(CF) (Type I) or SmartMedia(SM)

Focusing
- Focus modes: Manual, Auto
- Focus areas: single area

Exposure/metering
- Exposure modes: Program Auto, Aperture Priority, Shutter Priority, Manual
- Exposure metering: TTL full-aperture exposure metering
- Metering modes: ESP digital, Center-Weighted, Spot

Shutter
- Shutter: Beam splitting prism
- Shutter speed range: 1/640 to 2 seconds, bulb
- Continuous shooting: 3 frame/s up to 4 shots

Viewfinder
- Viewfinder: Optical TTL through beam splitting prism

General
- LCD screen: 1.8-inch 'flip-up'
- Weight: 1,050 g (37 oz)

The Olympus E-10 is a superzoom bridge camera with a 4.0-megapixel CCD image sensor that was introduced in 2000. The camera is not a system camera: its lens is fixed to the body. It has a TTL optical viewfinder, and a 4× optical zoom lens with lens aperture f/2–2.4. Instead of a moving (reflex) mirror a beam splitting fixed (non-reflex) prism is used to split the image between the optical viewfinder and CCD. Thus it was possible to have a live view on the LCD and in parallel see the image in the TTL viewfinder.

The E-10 has a strong metallic case that weighs in at approximately 37 oz (1,000 g). It was succeeded by the 5-megapixel Olympus E-20, announced in 2001.

== See also ==
- List of digital cameras with CCD sensors
