= Leica Digilux 2 =

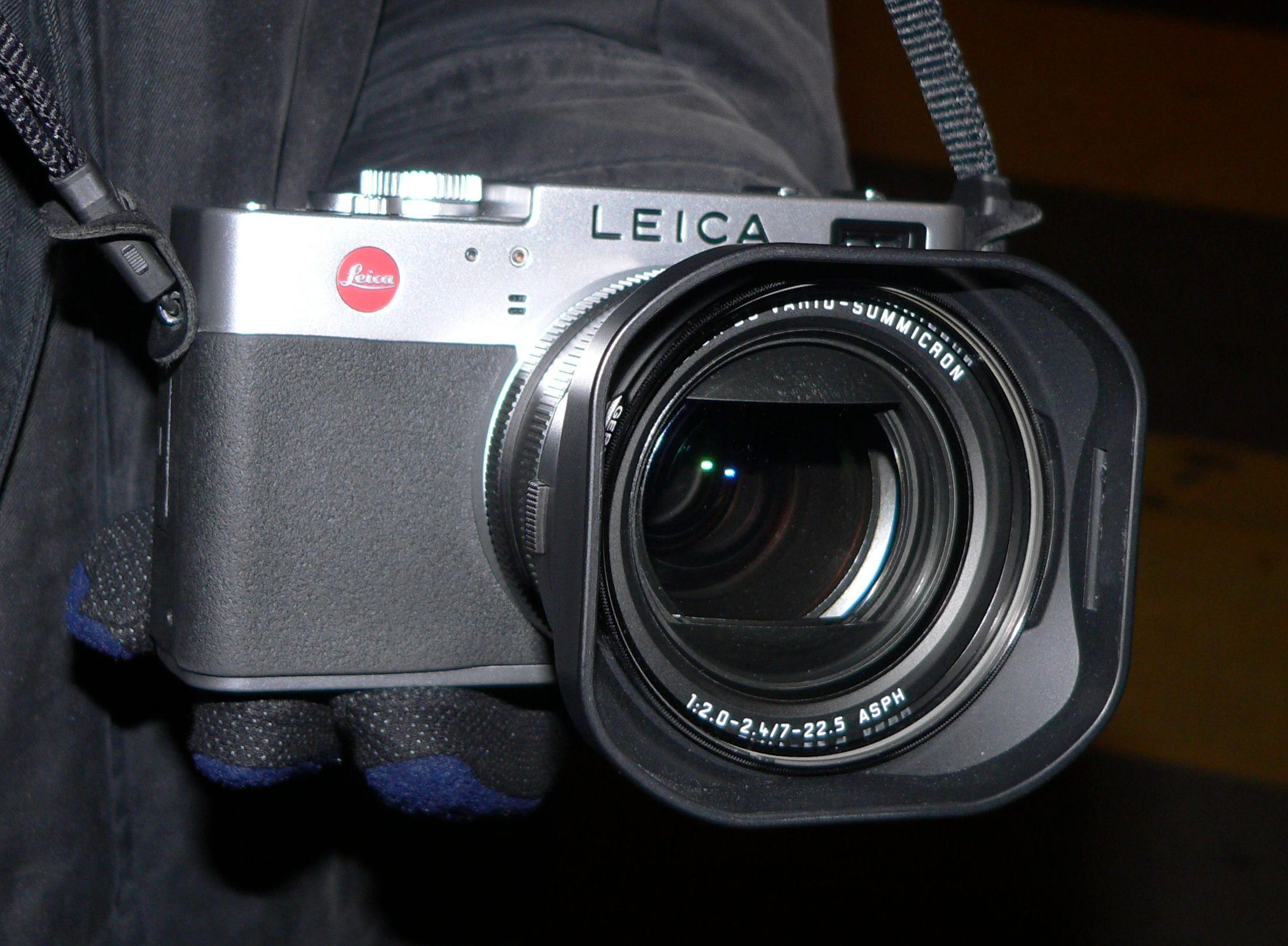

Overview
- Maker: Leica

Lens
- Lens: 28-90mm equivalent
- F-numbers: f/2.0-f/2.4 at the widest

Sensor/medium
- Sensor type: CCD
- Sensor size: 8.8 x 6.6mm (2/3 inch type)
- Maximum resolution: 2560 x 1920 (5 megapixels)
- Recording medium: Secure Digital and Multi Media Card

Shutter
- Shutter speeds: 1/2000s to 8s
- Continuous shooting: 2.7 frames per second

Viewfinder
- Viewfinder: Electronic

Image processing
- White balance: Yes

General
- LCD screen: 2.5 inches with 211,000 dots
- Dimensions: 135 x 82 x 103mm (5.31 x 3.23 x 4.06 inches)
- Weight: 705 g (25 oz) including battery

The Digilux 2 is a digital camera model sold by Leica Camera, with the body manufactured in Japan by Matsushita, which sold a variant as the Panasonic Lumix DMC-LC1. Its image sensor is a CCD with 5.24 million total pixels. It has a color, transreflective thin-film transistor liquid crystal display with 211,000 pixels, in addition to an electronic viewfinder. It has a near-focus range of 30 centimeters. The camera has a built-in flash. This flash, first of its kind, has the ability to be pointed up, as well as the standard method of pointing straight ahead, in order to "bounce" the light off a ceiling. The camera weighs 630 grams (without a battery). Its dimensions are 135 millimeters in width, 82 millimeters in height, and 103 millimeters in depth. The camera is fitted with a Leica Vario Summicron lens of f/2 with a zoom function of 28mm - 90mm in 35mm format.

The main selling point of the Digilux 2 is that it functions in a manner reminiscent of a rangefinder camera; the Leica lens features manual zoom, aperture and focus rings and the shutter speed can be manually adjusted via a dial on the camera. Many users cite the excellent Leica DC Vario-Summicron lens as their reason to purchase.

== See also ==
- Leica Digilux 1
- Leica Digilux 3
- List of digital cameras with CCD sensors
