= Leica Digilux 1 =

Overview
- Maker: Leica Camera
- Type: Advanced P&S

Lens
- Lens: Fixed, 7–21 mm f/2.0–2.8

Sensor/medium
- Sensor: CCD, CMYG filter array
- Maximum resolution: 2,240 × 1,680 (4 million)
- Storage media: Secure Digital Card, up to 1 GB

Viewfinder
- Viewfinder: Optical

Chronology
- Successor: Digilux 2 / DMC-LC1

The Leica Digilux 1 is a digital camera developed in partnership with Panasonic, which was released in 2002, roughly the same time as the Canon PowerShot G2 and the Nikon 2000. It is the second of Leica's digital offerings. Where the original Digilux was developed in partnership with Fuji Camera, the Digilux 1 was developed jointly with Panasonic; Leica is responsible for optics, while Panasonic designs the camera electronics. According to Leica, this allows both companies to design cameras that creates a harmonious matching of lens to sensor to produce color and contrast to Leica standards.

== Design ==
Billed as "the digital reportage camera", the Leica Digilux 1 shares much of its design with the Panasonic-badged equivalent DMC-LC5. At the time, the Digilux 1 boasted the lowest shutter lag in comparison to other cameras in its class, in combination with its fast lens, made the camera suitable for photo reportage / photojournalistic applications.

The Digilux 1 has a retro, boxy style that harkens back to the designs of Leica rangefinders; in appearance and in size, it is very similar to the Leica CM Zoom. The LC5 is housed in a more modern casing, but retains identical controls.

Some believe the Digilux 1 performs less post-processing on the image, resulting in colors and contrast that are more in line with the color and contrast expected from a Leica camera. The Panasonic DMC-LC5 performs post-processing that increases contrast and saturation to create photos that are acceptable to the consumer market.

=== Sensor ===
The Digilux 1 and Panasonic DMC-LC5 both use a CCD sensor fitted with a complementary CYGM color filter array, rather than the GRGB Bayer filter fitted to most other digital camera sensors. The CYGM filter had two benefits:

1. It captures about 2/3 of the visible spectrum versus GRGB which captures only 1/3 of the visible spectrum, so that the colors, especially reds and blues are more saturated. This is a benefit for landscapes especially.
2. The CYGM filter allows the passage of twice the photons, so that the camera is inherently twice as sensitive to light at the base ISO of 100, which means that exposure times are half that of a comparable camera with GRGB filter array.

However, the CYGM filter has less color accuracy.

=== Lens ===
Vario Summicron-branded lenses for the Digilux 1 and LC5, f 2.0 - f 2.8 7 – 21 mm

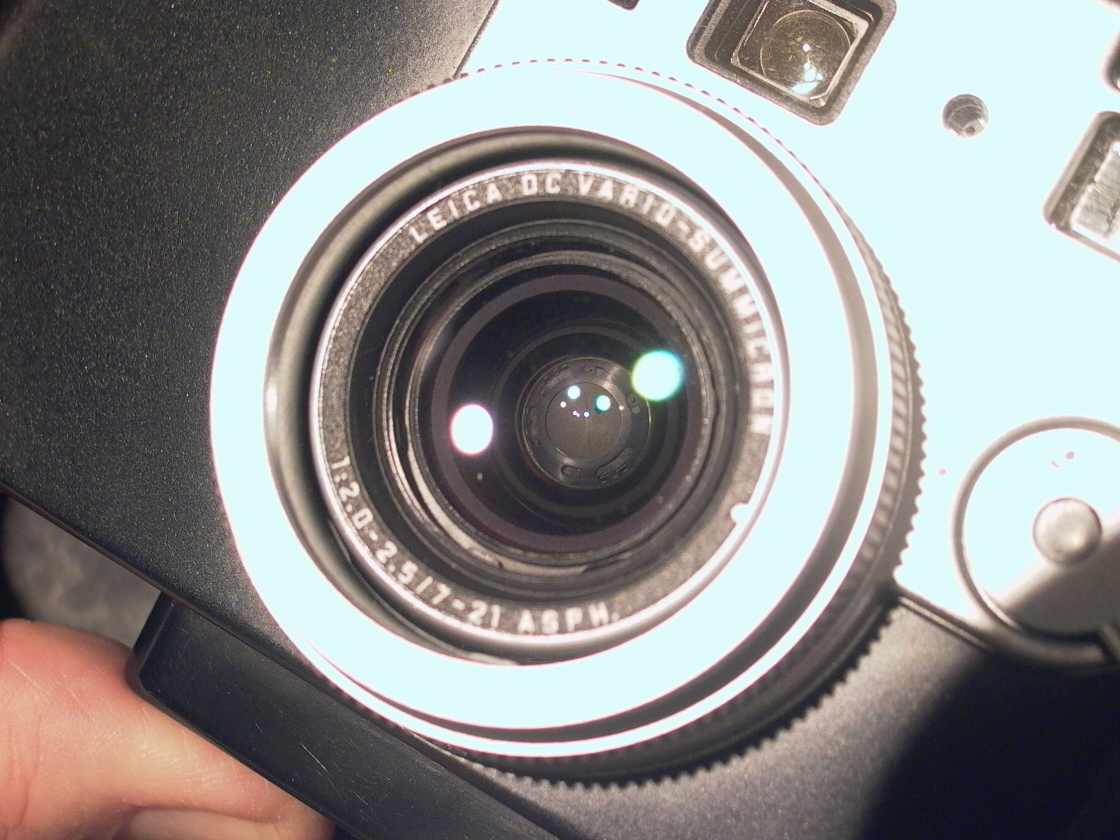
Digilux 1

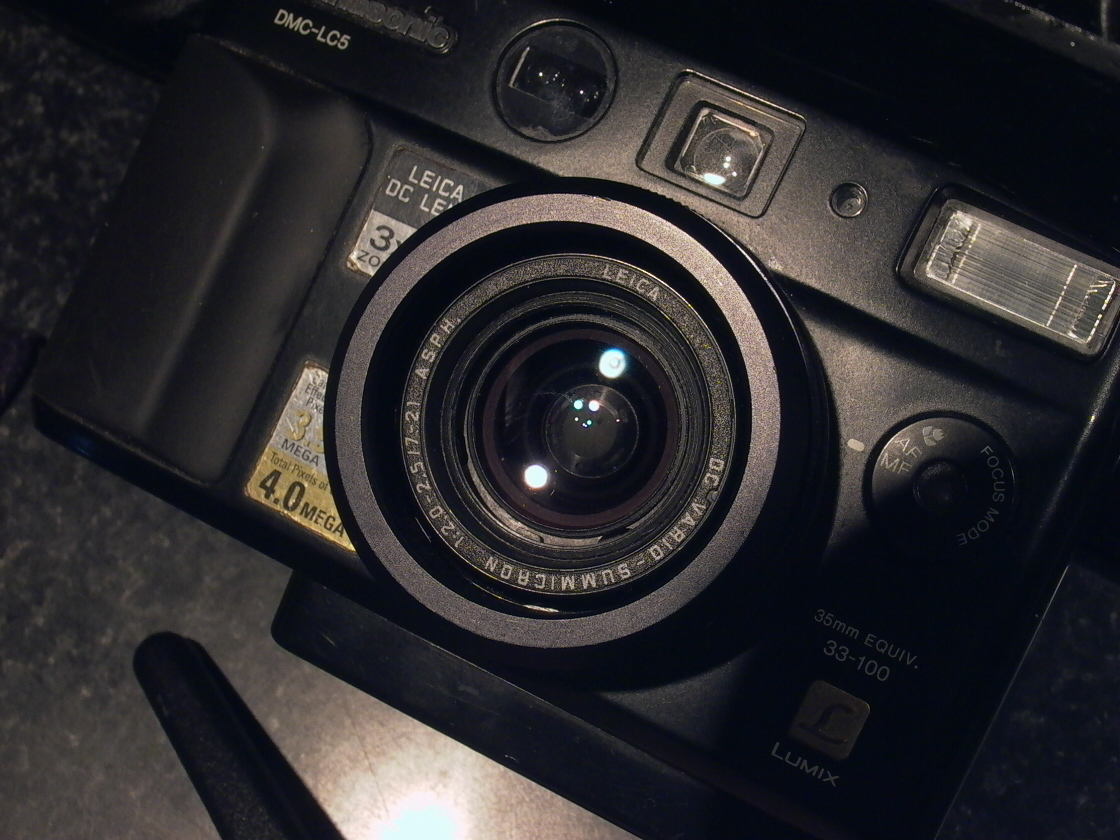
Lumix DMC-LC5

The camera has a 3× optical zoom lens branded Leica Vario-Summicron, with a focal length of 7~21 mm (equivalent to 34~102 mm focal length for a 135 film camera) and a variable maximum aperture ranging from f/2.0~2.5.

Compared with a typical compact cameras that has a maximum aperture ranging from f/3.5–5.6, the Digilux 1 is up to three f stops faster at telephoto: two f stops due to f2.8 vs f5.6 and one f stop due to the 2× photonic sensitivity afforded by the CYGM filter array. To match exposure time under this focal length at max available aperture requires the second camera to be set to ISO 800 while the Digilux 1 is at ISO 100 [tested cameras side by side.]

This lens has been fitted to numerous cameras using a 1/1.8" CCD sensor starting from 2000, including:

- Canon PowerShot G1
- Canon PowerShot G2
- Casio QV-3000EX (as a Canon lens)
- Casio QV-3500EX
- Casio QV-4000
- Casio QV-5700
- Epson PhotoPC 3000Z
- Epson PhotoPC 3100Z
- Panasonic Lumix DMC-LC40
- Sharp VE-CG30 (as a Canon lens)
- Sharp VE-CG40
- Sony Cyber-Shot DSC-S70 (as a Carl Zeiss-branded Vario-Sonnar)
- Sony Cyber-Shot DSC-S75
- Sony Cyber-Shot DSC-S85
- Sony CD Mavica MVC-CD300
- Sony CD Mavica MVC-CD400
- Sony CD Mavica MVC-CD500
- Toshiba PDR-M70
- Toshiba PDR-M81

== Operation ==
Batteries are readily available.

=== Post-processing ===
Digilux 1 images undergo less post-capture noise reduction compared to modern cameras, so it is always necessary to use a noise suppression filter in post processing when shooting above the base ISO of 100. If this is done, then ISO 400 images can be quite acceptable. At ISO 400 and f/2.0, the exposure times will be the same as a compact camera with an f/3.5 lens at ISO 2400, and the noise levels on the Digilux 1 will be much less after post-processing.

If you run across contemporary reviews of the camera from 2002, there is often a criticism of the noise levels and "smearing" or "watercolor" appearance. But with modern software, these issues are no longer problems. There are thousands of images on the WEB that attest to the quality of this camera (see also DMC-LC5 pictures.)

=== Exposure ===
On sunny days the light can be too bright for the camera, which has a minimum aperture of f/8 and a minimum exposure time of 1/1000 second. It may be necessary to add a polarizing filter or a neutral density filter of three f stops equivalent density, which requires an adapter which extends the lens housing beyond the most extreme travel of the zoom lens. This adapter is available as part of a wide angle conversion lens kit which, while sold mainly for the Panasonic DMC-LC5, also fits the Digilux 1. The wide-angle lens converter makes a 28 mm equivalent focal length, and with the Leica 28mm optical finder which fits the flash bracket, it makes a good quality wide-angle camera.

=== Manual controls ===
Full manual exposure is possible using the jog buttons. The display mimics the exposure changes rather than brightening up as the scene moves into darker areas, so that it is possible to see what the manual adjustments are doing to the image. The only problem is that for exposure time settings longer than 1/8 sec, the display won't match the actual exposed image.

The Digilux 1 and DMC-LC5 can be set for macro focus, and also manual focus, using the coaxial fly by wire ring control around the lens.

=== Storage ===
The camera stores images on SD cards up to 2GB; larger cards may not be recognized.

One of the biggest advantages is that the camera will shoot single frame TIFF files - each about 12 MB in size, and taking about 5 seconds to write to a fast SD card. These uncompressed files have none of the compression artifacts typical of JPEG files.

For rapid sequence shots the JPEG mode must be used. As also for auto exposure bracketing.

=== Flash ===
The built in flash is adjustable ±2 EV, which is good for fill in flash.

== See also ==
- Leica Camera
- Leica Digilux 2
- Leica Digilux 3
- Panasonic
  - Lumix
