= Olympus C-8080 Wide Zoom =

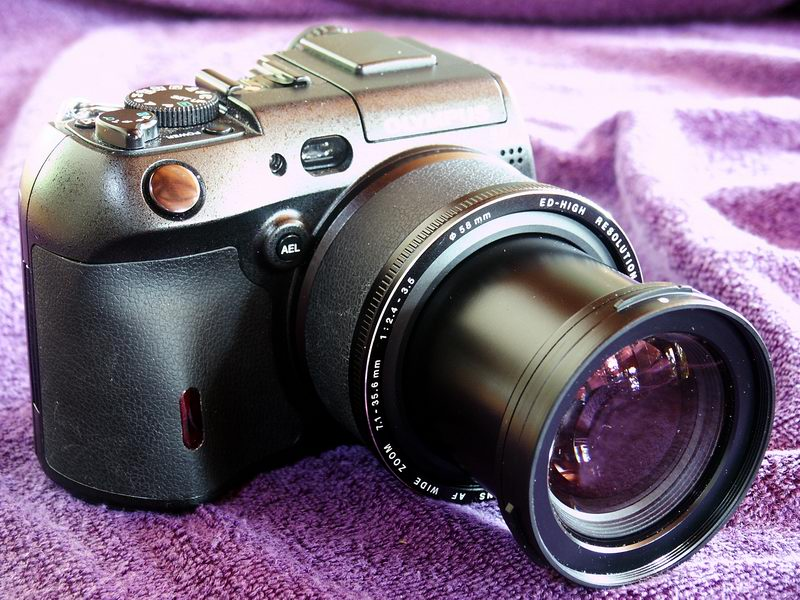

Overview
- Maker: Olympus Corporation
- Type: Digital prosumer camera

Lens
- Lens: 5x opt. zoom 28 - 140 mm equiv. F 2.4 - 3.5

Sensor/medium
- Sensor: 2/3-inch type CCD
- Maximum resolution: 3,264 × 2,448 (8 million)
- Film speed: 50-400 in 9 steps, comp. +/-2EV
- Storage media: CF (Type I or Type II), xD, IBM microdrive

Focusing
- Focus modes: Dual AF (TTL & external), contrast, phase-AF
- Focus areas: iESP, spot

Exposure/metering
- Exposure modes: Night, Landscape, Sports, Portrait
- Exposure metering: DESP, spot, multi-spot, center-weighted
- Metering modes: Progr. AE, A, P, M, My mode, movie

Flash
- Flash: Build in pop up, W: 0.8-5.3 m

Shutter
- Shutter speed range: 15 - 1/4000 sec
- Continuous shooting: 1.8 frame/s JPG Hi up to 5 frames

Viewfinder
- Viewfinder: EV 240 k pixels

Image processing
- White balance: One-touch, 4 presets

General
- LCD screen: 1.8-inch TFT, 134 k pixels, 100% coverage, tilting
- Battery: Li - Ion 1500 mA/7.2 V
- Weight: 724 g (26 oz)r (46.9 g) incl batt.

The Olympus C-8080 WZ is a digital camera formerly manufactured by Olympus. It was first announced on the opening day of the 2004 Photo Marketing Association Annual Convention and Trade Show. At the time, the C-8080 was set to be Olympus’ first eight-megapixel digital camera for the high-end consumer market. The MSRP was $1,149 USD.

A key feature, described in the name, is the camera’s optical zoom range. Most compact "zoom" cameras of the era were marketed for telephoto photography, providing high magnification of a distant subject. The lens of this camera includes a wide angle range suitable for group or landscape photography. It has a high resolution lens with 5x zoom (7.1 - 35.6 mm, 28 - 140 mm in 35mm equivalent) and an aperture ranging from f/2.4 at the widest angle to f/3.5 at maximum zoom. The focus range in normal mode is 0.8 m - inf., 20 - 80 cm in macro, and down to 5 cm in super-macro.

The metering modes for exposure are: ESP, center-weighted, multi-metering and spot. The metering target mark on the screen can be moved in 13 positions in spot mode. For absolute control a live histogram can be activated and the histogram target mark can be moved by the user. An AutoExposure Lock (AEL) button can lock the metered exposure.

The camera has two autofocus systems: one is based on contrast detection, the other on phase-difference detection (P-AF). The metering settings for the focus are: iESP, spot, full-time AF, P-AF, manual focus, macro, and super-macro. One of 9 positions can be selected for the AF target in spot mode.

Video can be recorded at 640 x 480 and 320 x 240, both at 15 frames per second. Clip length is only limited by the storage card.

The camera accepts xD-Picture Cards (necessary for panorama shooting), CompactFlash type I and II and IBM microdrives with two slots. Copying between slots is possible in the camera. Photos can be stored in TIFF, RAW and JPEG format. Videos are stored in Quicktime format using Motion JPEG encoding. Sound could also be recorded with still photos in Wave audio format. Data transfer connectivity is USB 2.0.

The rear display is a 4.5 cm tilting sunshine-LCD with 134,000 pixels, and the electronic viewfinder has 240,000 pixels.

The C-8080 WZ was succeeded at least partially by the C-7070 WZ in 2005. The latter camera was considered the successor of the C-5060 WZ, but had similar specifications and target market to the C-8080 WZ. Compared to the C-8080 WZ, the C-7070 WZ had a slower lens, was a slightly smaller size, and had a lower list price.

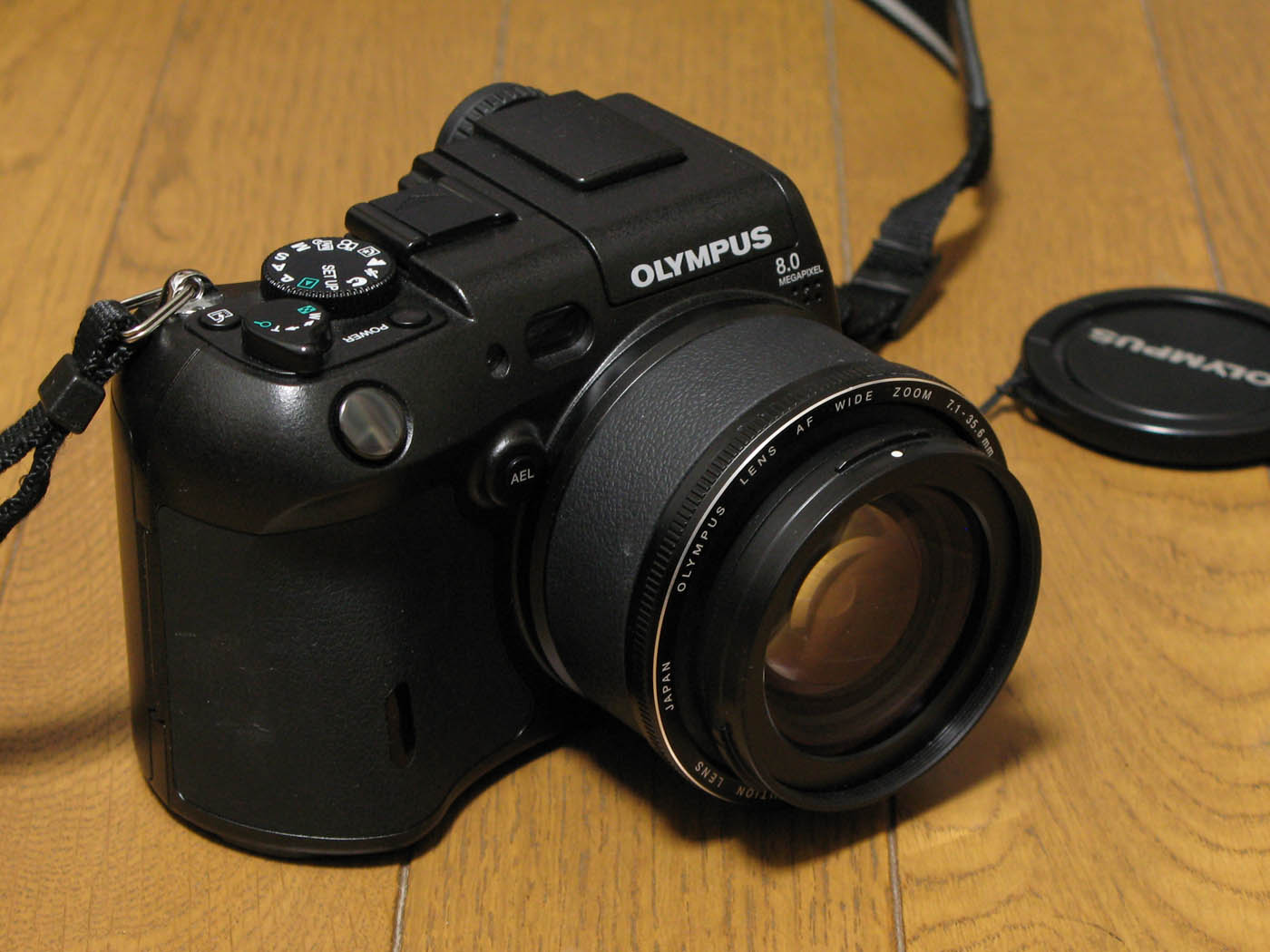
Olympus C-8080 WZ

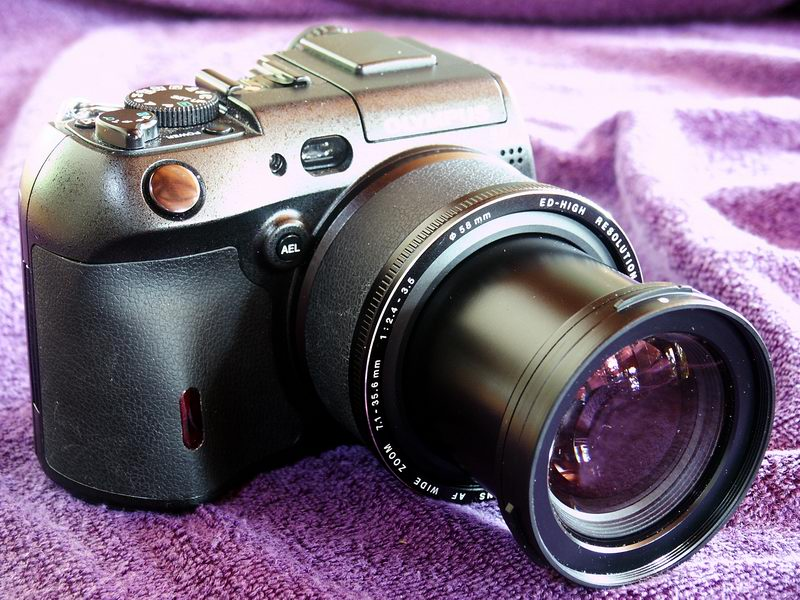
Olympus C-8080 WZ with extended zoom lens for telephoto

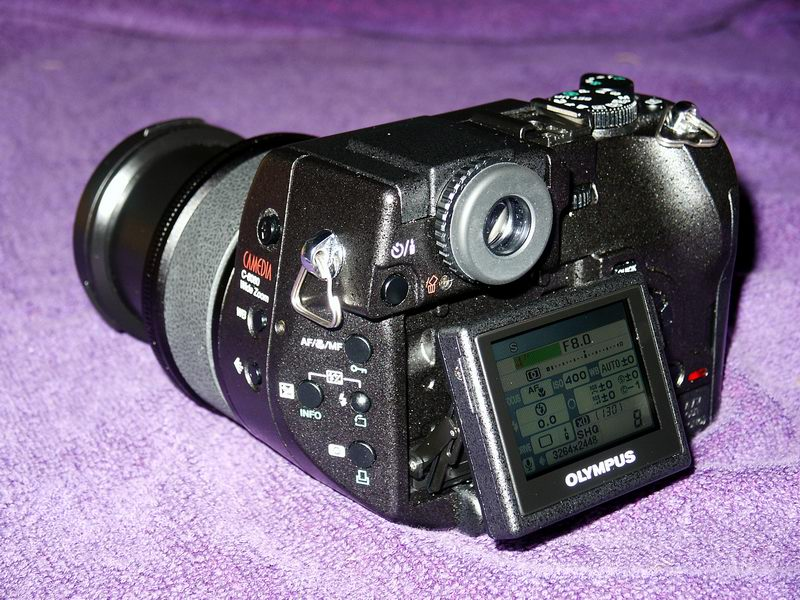
Olympus C-8080 WZ with tilted LCD

== Accessories ==
- Converter lenses: wide angle WCON-08D: (28 mm x 0.8 = 22.4 mm), tele TCON-14D: (140 mm x 1.4 = 196 mm)
- Remote control RM-1 with more functions than the RM-2(only for shutter release)
- Power grip B-HLD30
- AC-adaptor C-8AC
- LCD monitor cap
- Leather case
- Underwater camera housings PT-023, depth up to 40m

== Accessories included in retail package ==
- Lens cap
- Lens hood
- Shoulder strap
- Li-Ion batt. BLM-1
- Batt. charger BCM-2 (1 hour for full charge)
- IR Remote control RM-2
- 32 MB xD picture card
- AV cable
- USB cable
- CD ROM
- User manual

== See also ==
- List of digital cameras with CCD sensors
