= Canon PowerShot S200 =

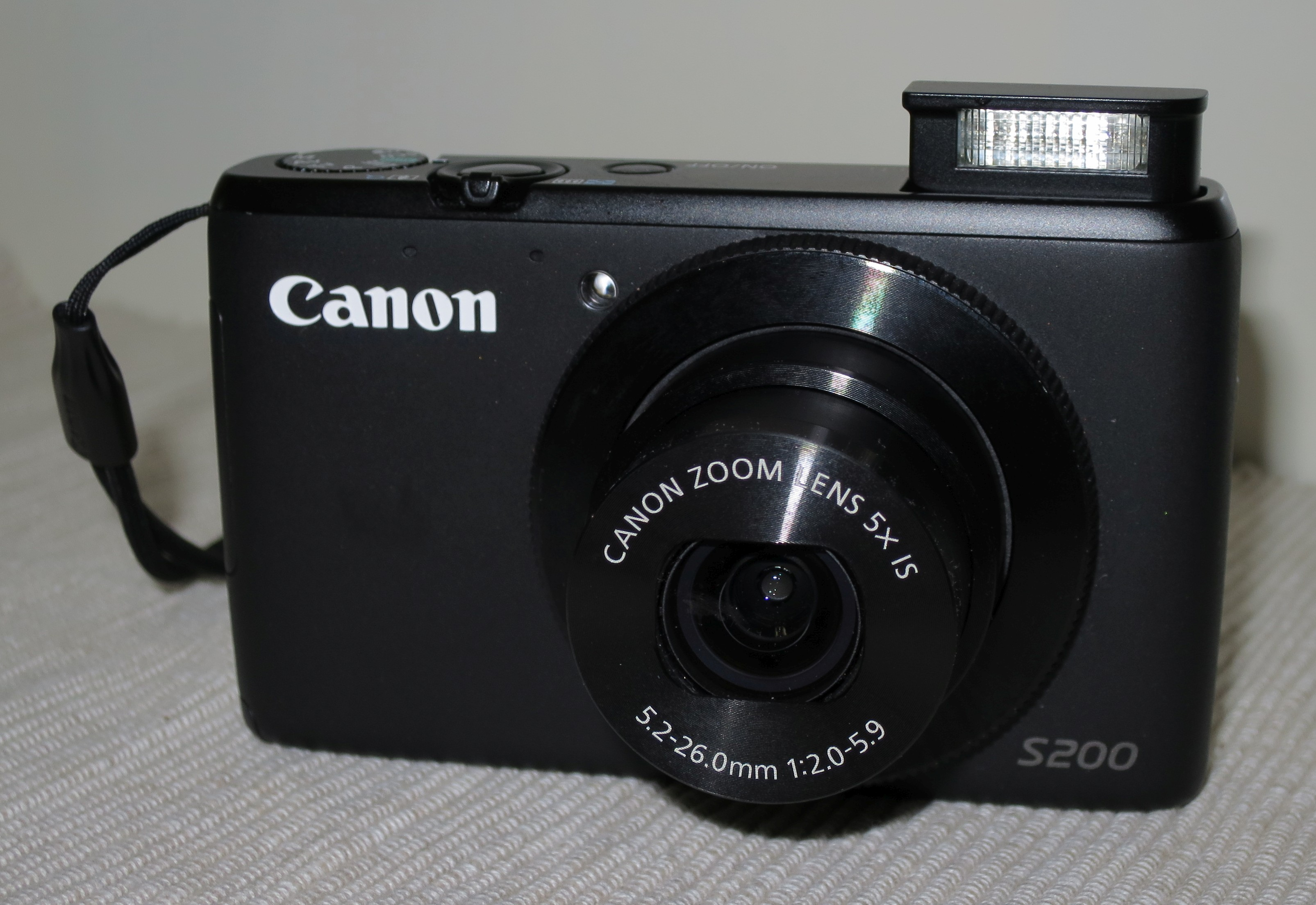

Overview
- Maker: Canon

Lens
- Lens: 5.2 - 26.0 mm (35 mm-equivalent: 24 - 120 mm)
- F-numbers: f/2.0-f/5.9 at the widest

Sensor/medium
- Sensor type: CCD
- Sensor size: 7.44 x 5.58 mm (1/1.7 inch type)
- Maximum resolution: 3648 x 2736 (10.1 megapixels)
- Film speed: Auto, ISO 80–6400 (in 1/3-step increments)
- Recording medium: SD, SDHC, SDXC

Focusing
- Focus areas: 9 focus points

Flash
- Flash: 50 cm - 7.0 m (wide), 50 cm - 2.3 m (tele)

Shutter
- Shutter speeds: 1/2000s to 15s
- Continuous shooting: 1.9 frame/s, Burst (2.5 MP): 4.5 frame/s.

Image processing
- Image processor: Digic 5
- White balance: Yes

General
- Video recording: (HD) 1280 x 720, 24 fps, (L) 640 x 480, 30 fps
- LCD screen: 7.5 cm (3.0 inch) TFT color LCD, approx. 461.000 dots
- Battery: Canon NB-6LH Li-Ion
- Dimensions: 99.8 by 59.0 by 26.3 millimetres (3.93 in × 2.32 in × 1.04 in)
- Weight: 181 g (6 oz) (including battery)

The Canon PowerShot S200 is a high-end 10.1-megapixel compact digital camera announced and released in 2014 by Canon. The PowerShot S200 is a cheaper version of the Powershot S110, utilizing a 10.1 MP CCD instead of a 12 MP CMOS sensor. It is built as a smaller brother to the S-series of the Canon PowerShot line of cameras. The S200 does not have RAW image file formatting.

== Features ==
- 10.1 megapixels
- JPEG (Exif 2.3) support
- ISO sensitivity 80–6400 (in 1/3-step increments).
- Full manual control.
- Customizable Control Ring to control ISO, shutter speed, aperture, focus, or exposure compensation.
- Video recording : 1280 × 720 (24 frame/s) and 640 × 480 (30 frame/s)
- Video recording Miniature Effect: 1280 × 720 (4.8 / 2.4 / 1.2 frame/s), 640 × 480 (6 / 3 / 1.5 frame/s)
- Continuous shooting: ~1.9 frame/s, 4.5 frame/s (2.5 MP). ~0.8 frame/s with AF.
- Wi-Fi for Internet connectivity or image archival

== See also ==
- List of digital cameras with CCD sensors
