= Olympus E-20 =

Digital camera model

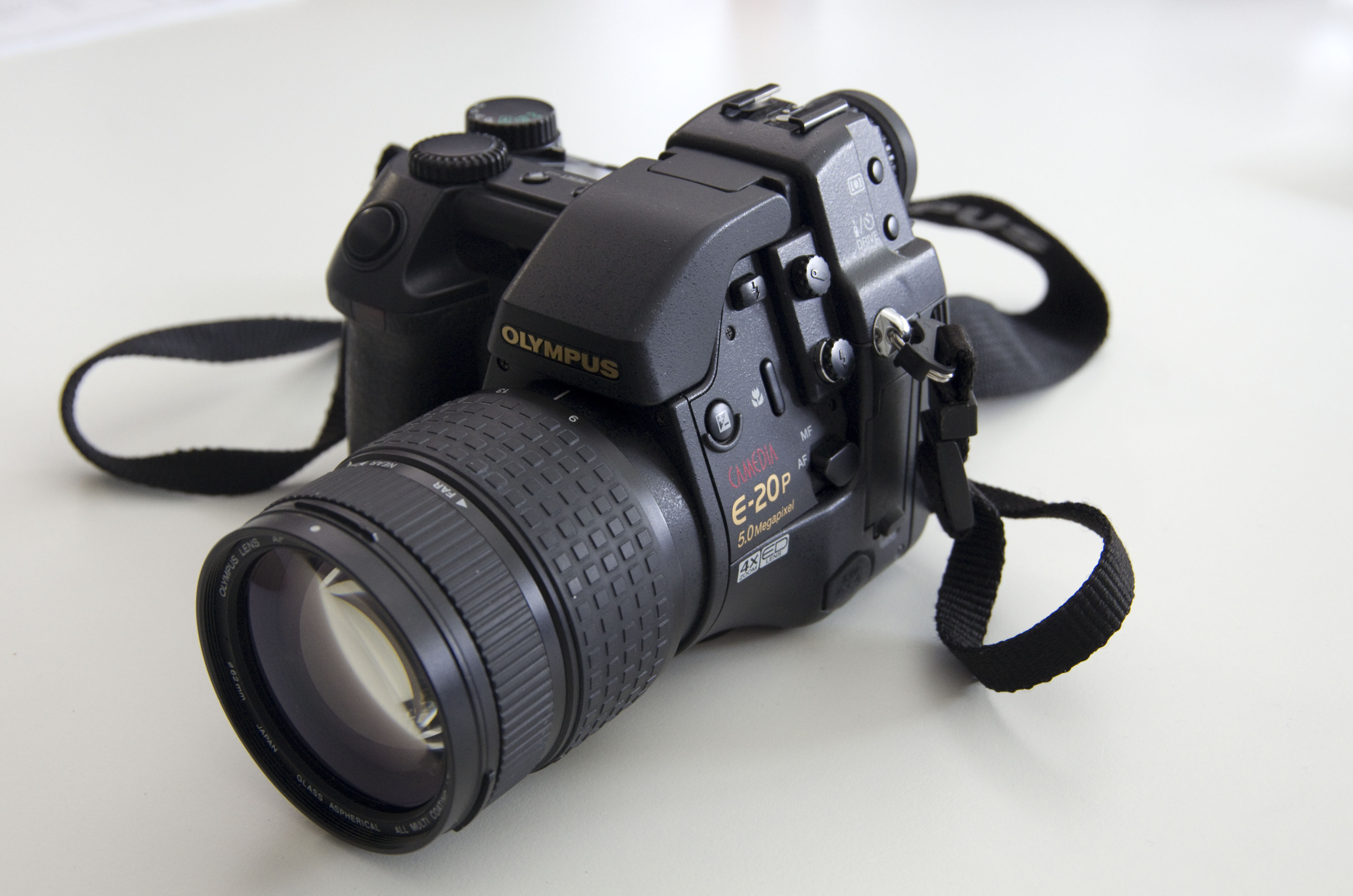

Overview
- Maker: Olympus Corporation
- Type: Bridge

Lens
- Lens: non-interchangeable 9-36 mm zoom (35-140 mm full frame equivalent), f/2.0-f/2.4

Sensor/medium
- Maximum resolution: 2,560 × 1,920 (5.2 million)
- Film speed: 80 to 320
- Storage media: SmartMedia, CompactFlash (Type I or Type II)

Focusing
- Focus modes: Auto, Manual, Auto+Manual, Continuous

Exposure/metering
- Exposure modes: Manual, Shutter Priority, Aperture Priority, Program
- Exposure metering: ESP, center-weighted, spot
- Metering modes: ESP, Center-Weighted, Spot

Flash
- Flash: both built-in and hot shoe

Shutter
- Shutter speed range: 1/640 to 60 seconds, bulb
- Continuous shooting: 2.5 frame/s (4 images)

Viewfinder
- Viewfinder: Optical TTL

Image processing
- WB bracketing: Yes, adjustable to increments of 2 steps, 3 steps, or 6 steps.

General
- LCD screen: 1.8" flip-up (118,000 pixels)
- Battery: (4) AA NiMH batteries and charger (supplied)
- Weight: 1190 g (42 oz)

The Olympus E-20 (available under the names E-20N and E-20P, depending on whether it had NTSC or PAL video output, respectively) is a 5-megapixel superzoom bridge camera manufactured by Olympus Corporation of Japan, as a successor to its E-10 model. Like the E-10, it has a fixed lens and a beam splitting prism instead of a moving mirror. It has easy dial keys for choices of pictures, videos, and more. It was announced on September 13, 2001.

== See also ==
- List of digital cameras with CCD sensors
