= Panasonic Lumix DMC-LX7 =

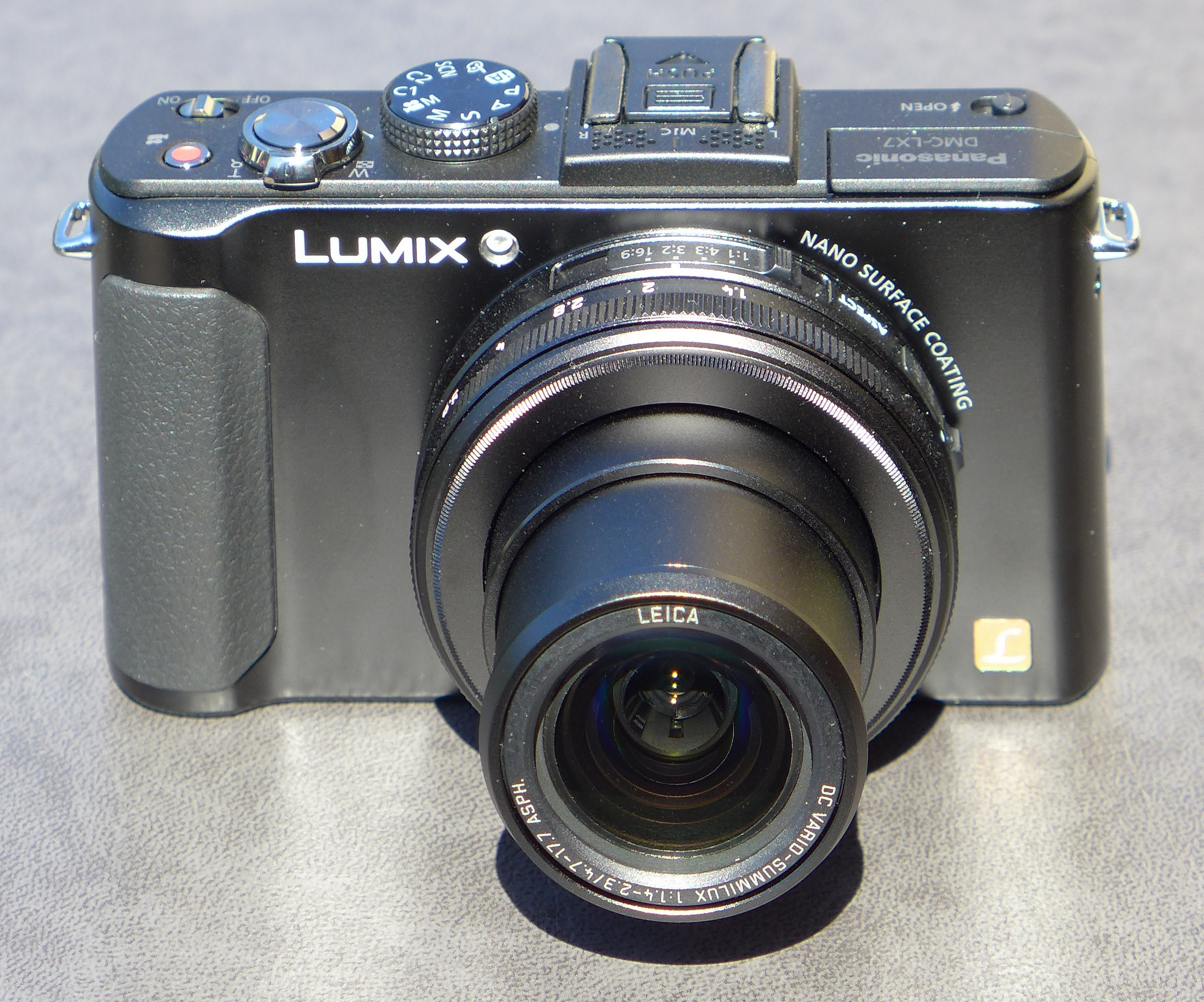

Overview
- Maker: Panasonic Holdings Corporation
- Type: Digital Camera

Lens
- Lens: f=4.7 - 17.7mm (24 - 90mm in 35mm equiv.) F1.4/2.3

Sensor/medium
- Sensor: 1/1.7" MOS res = 3648×2736 (10.1 megapixels)
- Film speed: ISO 80, 100, 200, 400, 800, 1600, 3200, High Sensitivity (1600 - 12800)
- Storage media: Built-In Memory appx 70Mb + (Secure Digital Card (SD/SDHC/SDXC)

Focusing
- Focus modes: Normal / Macro, Quick AF, Continuous AF, AF / MF Switchable, Manual Focus (Jog dial), One Shot AF, AF Area Select, AF Tracking
- Focus areas: Face, AF Tracking, Multi (23-area), 1-area (flexible / scalable)

Exposure/metering
- Exposure modes: Program AE, Aperture Priority AE, Shutter Priority AE, Manual, Program Shift (Program AE Mode), Creative Mode, Creative Video Mode, Custom Mode 1, Custom Mode 2, Scene Mode, Intelligent Auto
- Metering modes: Intelligent Multiple, Center Weighted, Spot

Flash
- Flash: Internal

Shutter
- Shutter speed range: 1/4000 sec – appx 250 sec
- Continuous shooting: 11 fps for 12 frames (Fine), up to approx. 60 frames/sec (recorded in 2.5M) / approx. 40 frames/sec (recorded in 5M)

Image processing
- White balance: Auto, Daylight, Cloudy, Shade, Flash, Halogen, Color Temperature, White Set 1, White Set 2, White Balance Adjustment

General
- LCD screen: 7.5cm(3.0") TFT Screen LCD (920K dots)
- Battery: Li-ion Battery Pack (3.6 V, 1250 mAh)
- Dimensions: 109.7×65.5×43.0 mm (4.32×2.58×1.69 in) (W * H * D)
- Weight: 271 g (9.6 oz)
- Made in: Japan

The Panasonic Lumix DMC-LX7, or LX7, is a high-end compact "point and shoot" camera launched by Panasonic in 2012 to succeed the LX5.

== Features ==
The LX7 has:.

- High sensitivity 1/1.7-inch MOS sensor (10.1 megapixels)
- 24 – 90 mm (35 mm equivalent) ultra wide-angle f/1.4 - 2.3 LEICA DC VARIO-SUMMICRON lens (3.8× optical zoom)
- POWER O.I.S (optical image stabilizer)
- 3.0-inch (920,000-dot) TFT LCD
- Optional full manual operation
- HD 1080p/60 quality movie clips in AVCHD and Motion JPEG format
- HDMI output

== Lens ==
The Leica lens is unusually fast for a compact camera, with a maximum aperture of f/1.4. The 3.8× maximum zoom of the lens is relatively limited, however, and zooming limits the aperture. For example, at 2× optical zoom, the maximum aperture (lowest f-stop) is f/1.8, and at 3.8× zoom it is f/2.3.

No lens correction is applied to files stored in RAW mode (.RW2 extension). The following table provides empirically determined lens distortion factors that can be used with the GIMP image processing software’s “Lens Distortion” plug-in to approximate the lens-correction provided by the camera in its JPEG images:

Focal Length (mm)	Main (spherical correction)	Zoom* (image enlargement)	Brighten (vignetting)
4.7	-23.0	-1.2	+15
5.1	-21.5	-0.9	?
5.5	-16.7	-1.2	?
5.9	-12.5	-0.9	?
6.3	-10.0	-0.9	?
8.4+	0	0	0

The experimental estimates for the “zoom” value do not follow any consistent curve, and a constant “zoom” value of -1.0 may be appropriate.

== Accessories ==
Official Panasonic accessories available separately include an electronic live viewfinder, external optical viewfinder (both of which attach to the camera's hot-shoe), spare batteries, filter adaptor ring (which allows the attachment of 37mm filters), 'PU leather' case, A/C adaptor (to allow mains power of the camera), HDMI mini cable, and a selection of external flashes.

== Similar cameras ==
- Leica D-LUX 6
