= HTC Prophet =

Mobile phone and digital assistant

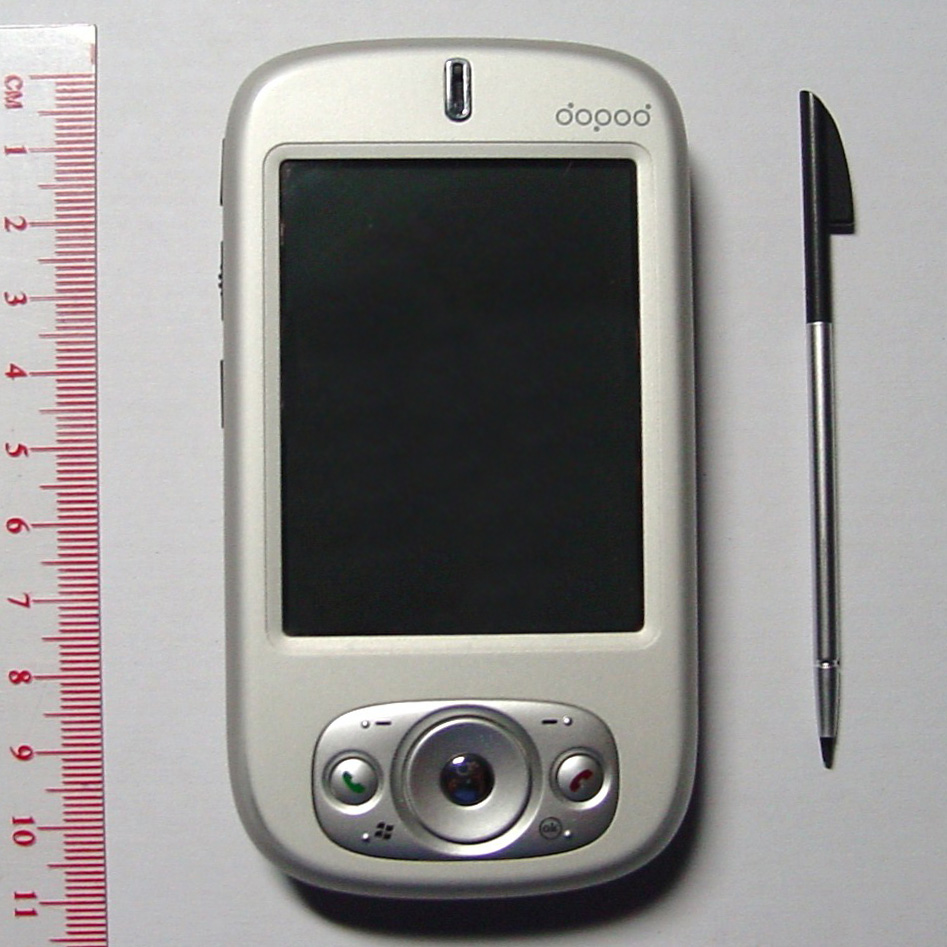
- Manufacturer: HTC
- Type: PDA Phone
- Lifespan: Q2 2006
- Media: SD card
- Operating system: Windows Mobile 5
- Camera: 2.0-megapixel
- Connectivity: GSM, Bluetooth, Infrared
- Power: Battery, Li-ion Polymer

The HTC Prophet is a combined Personal Digital Assistant (PDA) and mobile telephone manufactured by HTC.

It was released onto the UK market by Orange UK in April 2006 under the name Orange SPV M600. In Asia, it is marketed under the name Dopod 818 pro. It is also available on other networks as the Qtek S200 or the i-mate JAMin.

== Features ==
Closely resembling the HTC Magician, the device is a 2.75G phone with a 2.8" 240x320 touchscreen, a 2.0-megapixel digital camera, Bluetooth 2.0 without EDR (equivalent to version 1.2 with additional bug fixes), WiFi 802.11b/g, Infrared Technology, Microsoft Push email access, 128 MB internal memory and a full sized SD card slot (no SDHC support). It is based on the Microsoft Windows Mobile 5.0 Professional platform, and was among the first Pocket PC phones to use the operating system. It has Microsoft Word, Excel and PowerPoint. The phone also includes Pocket Internet Explorer and Windows Media Player 10 Mobile as well as some carrier or provider specific software.

== Specifications ==
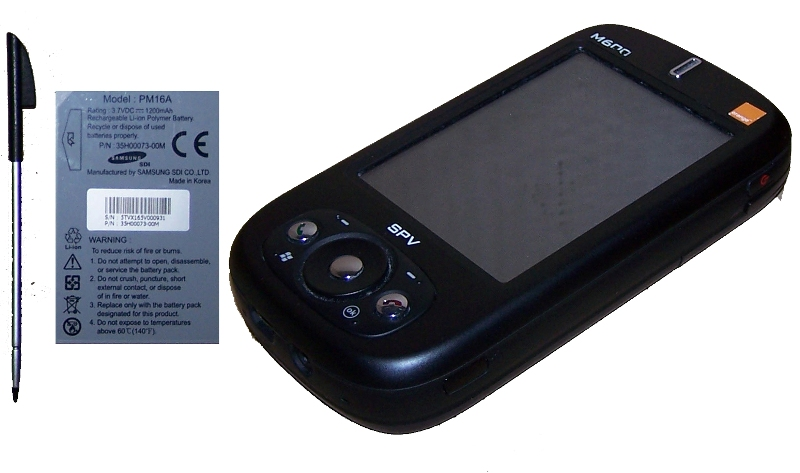
Orange SPV M600 with Battery and Stylus

- Texas Instruments OMAP 850 200 MHz CPU
- 128 MB ROM, 64 RAM;
- Talk time 5.0 hours
- Standby 200 hours
- Weight: 150g
- 2.0-megapixel camera, Macro Mode.
- Bluetooth
- Email
- Infrared connection
- MP3 player
- Polyphonic ring tones
- True Tones
- MP3 Ringtones
- Video Messaging
- Wap
- WiFi

== Windows Mobile 6 (Crossbow) ==
There were several "unofficial" builds of Windows Mobile 6 (Crossbow), WM6.1 and even some Windows Mobile 6.5 builds which ran on this device. Some tools allowed users to create their own custom WM6 ROM images (a process most commonly known by the term "cooking ROM's"). There has been a semi-underground community of people dedicated to improving these WM6 builds (and associated tools) on the Prophet, most notably xda-developers.

== Unlocking ==
The Prophet can be unlocked if required using Lokiwiz .
