= Samsung EX1 =

Compact camera developed by Samsung

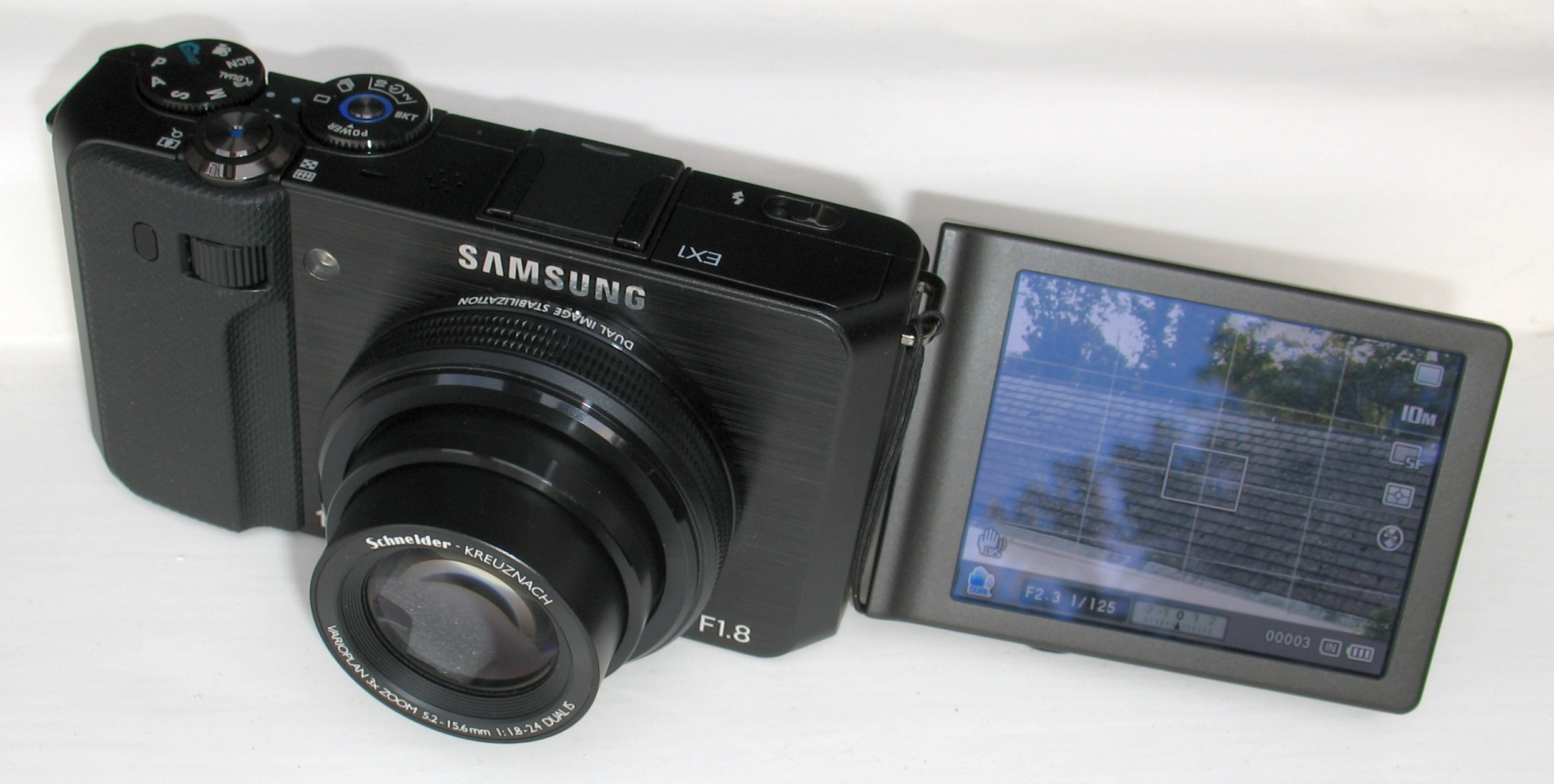
European version EX1 with its articulating screen extended

Samsung EX1 (known as Samsung TL500 in US) is an enthusiast digital compact camera with a f/1.8–2.4 wide angle 3× (5.2–15.6 mm, resp. 24–72 mm of 35 mm equivalent focal length), image stabilized zoom lens. It comes with a 1/1.7" 10MP CCD sensor (same as is used in some Sony, Nikon, and Canon cameras), and a 3.0" multi-angle Active-matrix OLED display. It also has RAW capture, and VGA video recording in H.264 format.

Samsung EX1-VE was introduced after 1.5 years.

It was announced on February 20, 2010.

== Add-ons ==
- Optical viewfinder – EA-OVF1
- Wide conversion lens – Teleside converter 0,75× (18 mm) resp. Telecompressor – EA-LWCEX01

== See also ==
- List of digital cameras with CCD sensors
