= Nikon Coolpix P7000 =

Digital camera model

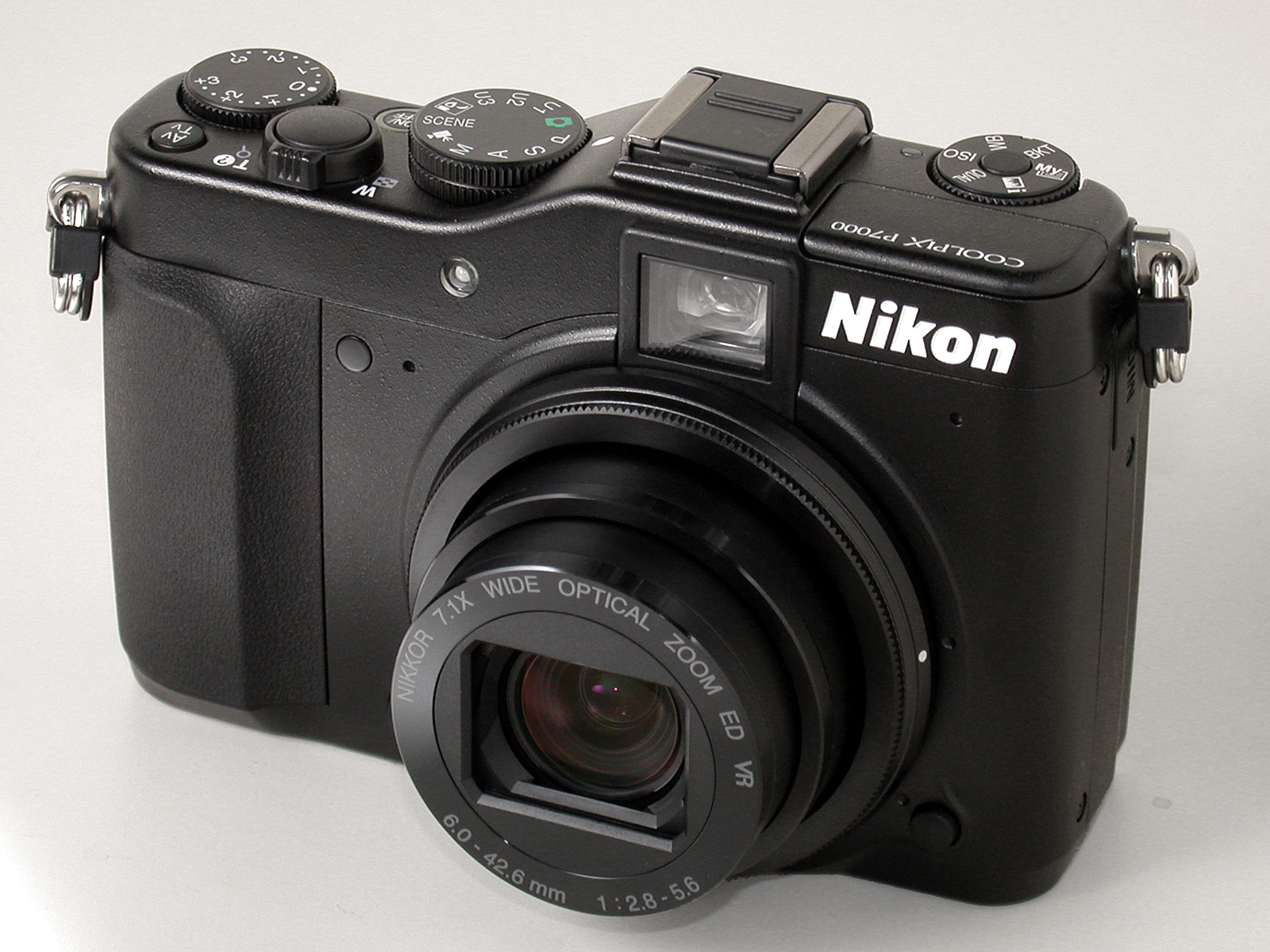
- Maker: Nikon

Lens
- Lens: NIKKOR ED Glass Lens; 7.1x Wide-Angle Optical Zoom

Sensor/medium
- Sensor: CCD
- Sensor size: 7.44 x 5.58mm (1/1.7 inch type)
- Maximum resolution: 10.1 million pixels 3648 × 2736
- Film speed: 100–6400
- Storage media: SD – SDHC

Shutter
- Shutter speed range: 1/4000 - 60sec

Viewfinder
- Viewfinder: Optical

The Coolpix P7000 is a digital compact camera introduced by the Nikon Corporation in 2010. It is designed as a high-end “enthusiast” compact offering a 10.1-megapixel 1/1.7-inch CCD sensor, a 7.1× NIKKOR optical zoom lens (28–200 mm equivalent), and full manual (P/S/A/M) controls, aiming to deliver DSLR-style handling and image quality in a portable body.

== Features ==
The Nikon Coolpix P7000 uses a 1/1.7-inch CCD sensor with an effective resolution of 10.1 megapixels. It is fitted with a 7.1× NIKKOR optical zoom lens equivalent to 28–200 mm in 35 mm terms, with a maximum aperture of f/2.8–5.6. The lens includes lens-shift vibration reduction for image stabilization. The camera supports RAW (NRW) and JPEG formats and incorporates a built-in neutral-density filter.

The P7000 features a 3.0-inch TFT LCD with approximately 921,000 dots. Shooting modes include Program, Shutter-priority, Aperture-priority, and Manual exposure, along with bracketing options for exposure and white balance. The ISO range runs from 100 to 3200, with an extended Hi-1 setting equivalent to 6400. Macro shooting is supported down to 2 cm in wide-angle mode.

The camera records video at 1280×720 (720p) at 24 frames per second with stereo audio, and it allows optical zoom during recording. Additional features include an electronic viewfinder accessory port, built-in flash with flash exposure compensation, Zoom Memory for saving focal lengths, and compatibility with Nikon's external Speedlights using the hot shoe. Storage is via SD/SDHC/SDXC cards. Power is supplied by the EN-EL14 rechargeable lithium-ion battery.

== See also ==
- List of digital cameras with CCD sensors
