= Panasonic Lumix DC-GH5S =

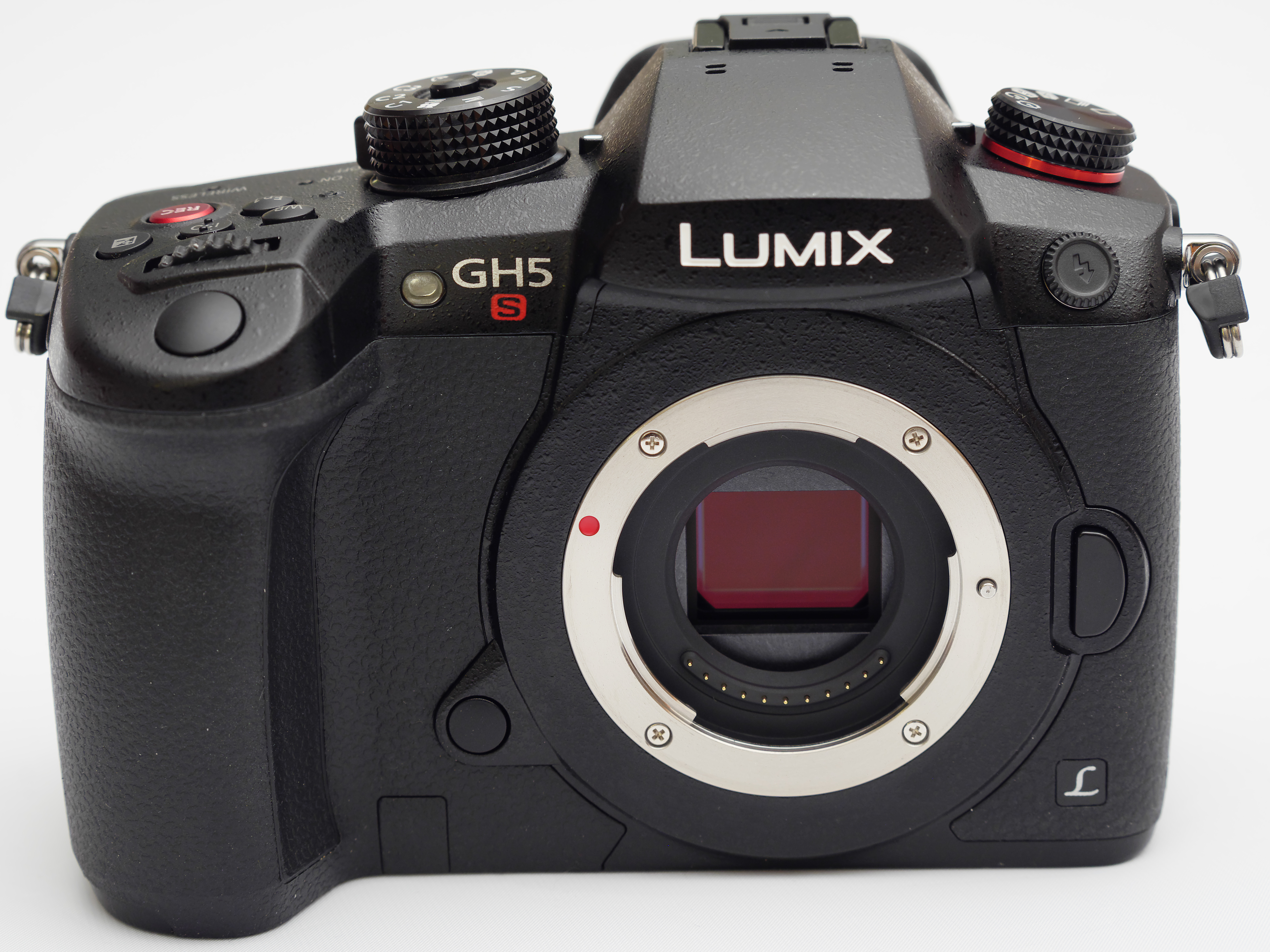

Overview
- Type: Micro Four Thirds system mirrorless camera
- Released: January 2018

Lens
- Lens mount: Micro Four Thirds system mount

Sensor/medium
- Sensor: 4/3-type, multi aspect: 4:3, 3:2, 16:9, 17:9
- Sensor type: CMOS
- Sensor size: 17.3 x 13 mm (4:3 aspect ratio)
- Maximum resolution: 3680 px × 2760 px, 3840 px × 2560 px, 4016 px × 2256 px, 4096 px × 2160 px (10.28 Megapixels)
- Film speed: ISO 160 to ISO 51200, extendable from ISO 80 to ISO 204800
- Recording medium: 2x SD / SDHC / SDXC UHS-I/UHS-II speed class 3

Focusing
- Focus: Switchable auto and manual
- Focus modes: AF-C (continuous-servo), AF-F (flexible AF), AF-S (single servo AF), Manual Focus
- Focus areas: 225 contrast detection AF

Exposure/metering
- Exposure modes: Program AE; aperture Priority, shutter priority, manual
- Metering modes: Center-weighted, multiple, spot

Flash
- Flash synchronization: 1/250
- Flash bracketing: ±3 EV in ⅓ EV steps

Shutter
- Shutter: Focal-plane shutter / Electronic shutter
- Shutter speed range: 1/8000 - 60 s (mechanical shutter), bulb (up to 30 minutes), 1/16000s (electronic shutter)
- Continuous shooting: 11 fps (mechanical shutter, 10 Mpx, 14 bits), 60 fps at 8 MP (electronic shutter)

Viewfinder
- Viewfinder: OLED viewfinder; 3.68 Mdots
- Viewfinder magnification: 0.76x

Image processing
- White balance: Auto, cloudy, shade, incadescent, flash, daylight, white set 1/2/3/4, custom WB based on color temperature

General
- Video recording: AVCHD / MP4 / MOV; 4096 x 2160 (24p, 25p, 30p, 60p); 3840 x 2160 (24p, 25p, 30p, 50p, 60p); 3328 x 2496p (24p, 25p, 30p 50p, 60p); 1920 x 1080p (24p, 25p, 30p, 50p, 60p, …, 240p)
- LCD screen: 3.2", 1.62 Mdots, free-angle
- Battery: 7.2v 1860 mAh Lithium-ion battery pack
- Data port(s): Wi-Fi, Bluetooth, full-sized HDMI Type-A, USB 3.1 Gen1 5Gbit/s,
- Dimensions: 139×98×87 mm (5.5×3.9×3.4 in) (5.5 * 3.9 * 3.4")
- Weight: 660 g (23 oz) (battery and SD cards inserted)
- Made in: China

The Panasonic Lumix DC-GH5S is a Micro Four Thirds mirrorless interchangeable lens camera body announced and released by Panasonic in January 2018.

== Physical characteristics ==
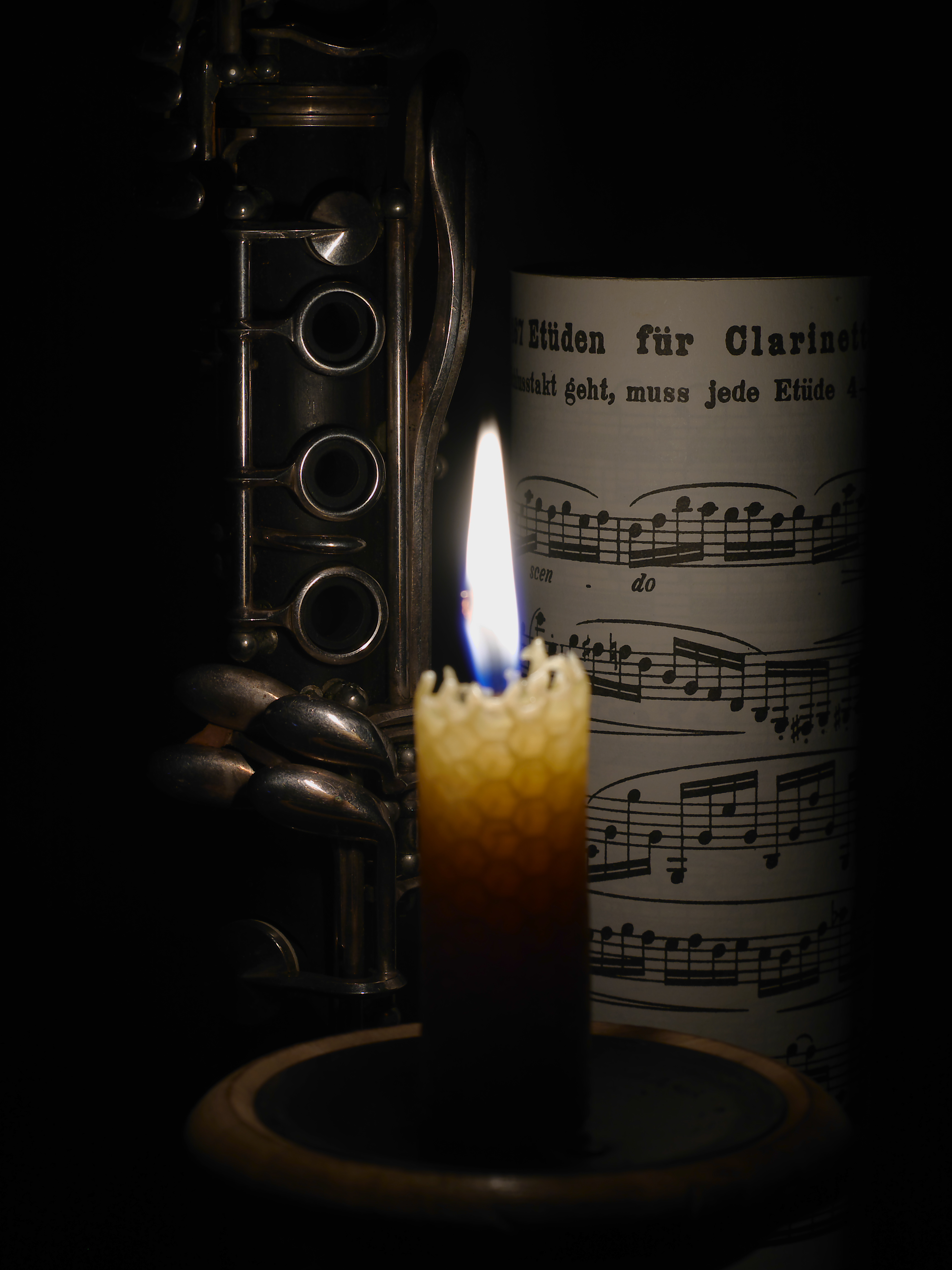
Example in candle light with high contrast and high dynamic range between bright flame and dark background

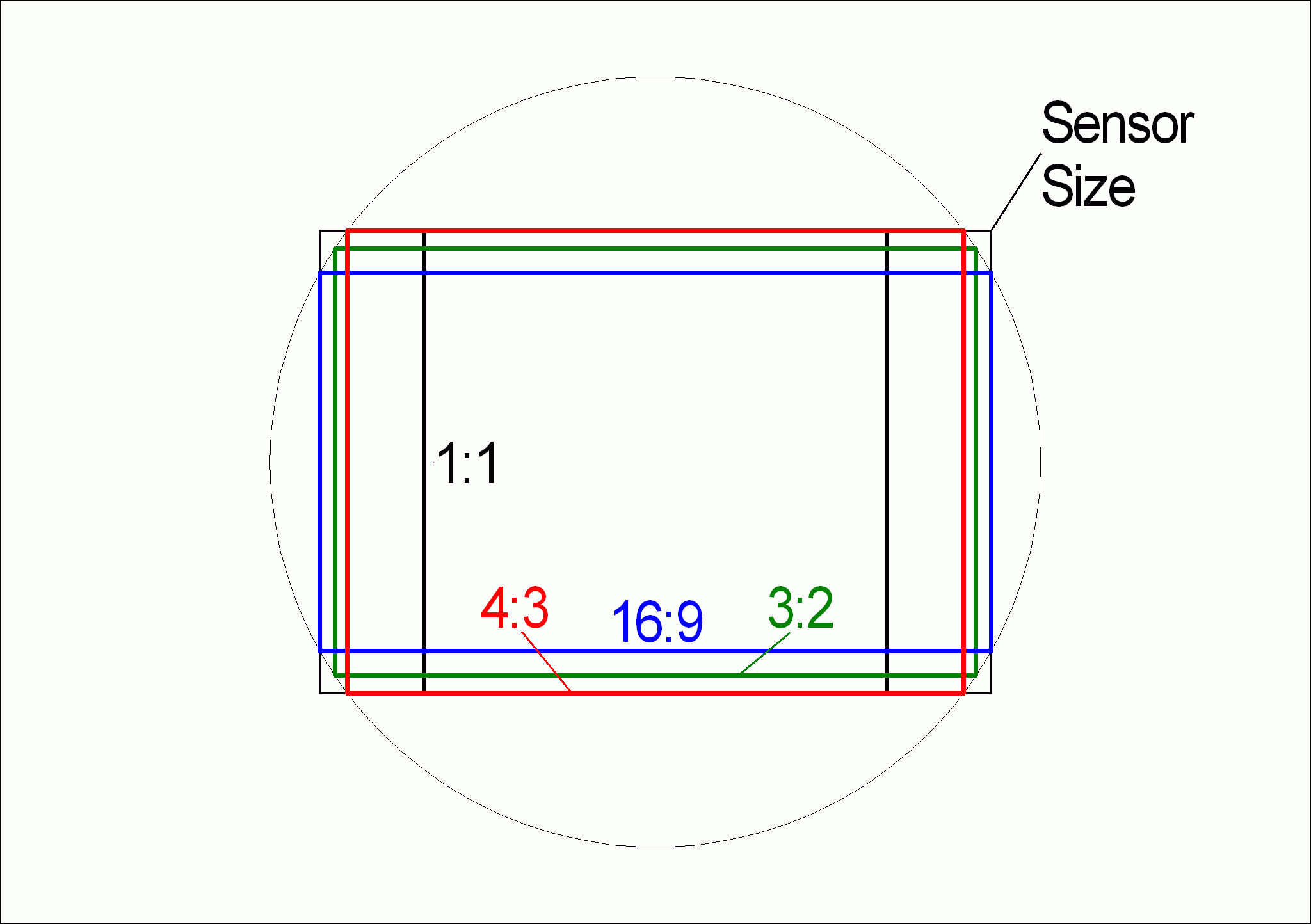
Different aspect ratios without image sensor cropping

Video clip of a meteor of the Perseids, crop of a 4K-recording with 30 frames per second and with an exposure index of ISO 12800

It is the first mirrorless camera body of Panasonic, where the image sensor is equipped with two analogue amplifiers for every pixel (Dual Native ISO). With this technology, the model shall be predestinated for video shooting in low light and high dynamic range situations.

The body is made of a magnesium alloy, and it has a fully articulable monitor with touch screen functionality as well as an electronic viewfinder and a hot shoe for a flash light.

Via Wi-Fi, the camera can be remotely controlled and accessed by smartphones, tablet computers or mobile and desktop computers with the mobile app Panasonic Image App. Via USB cable, there is the possibility of remote shooting with the software Lumix Tether.

== Special properties ==
Compared to the sister model Panasonic Lumix DMC-GH5, the GH5S differs mainly in the following properties:

- Image sensor
  - „Multi-Aspect“ with aspect ratios 4:3, 3:2, 16:9, 17:9
  - „Dual Native ISO“ (with two amplifiers per pixel with different amplification factor)
    - „low“ with exposure indices ISO 160 to ISO 800, extendible from ISO 80, native sensitivity ISO 400
    - „high“ with exposure indices ISO 800 to ISO 51200, extendible to ISO 204800, native sensitivity ISO 2500
  - Lower maximum pixel count of 10 megapixels with a larger pixel pitch of 4,7 micrometers
  - No 6k photo modus (with 18 megapixels)
  - No stabilisation at image sensor, and therefore, no „'Dual-IS“ (synchronisation between the image stabilisation systems of lenses and camera body)
- Video functions
  - 4k video recordings with 60 frames per second
  - Slow motion recordings in Full HD with 240 frames per second
  - In- and output for timecode signals

In the following image sequence, there is an object taken with f-number 5.6 and with different exposure indices between ISO 160 and ISO 51200. As a result, the images had to be taken with different shutter speeds. At ISO 51200, image noise is easily recognisable at full magnification:

Exposure index sequence taken with Panasonic Lumix DC-GH5S

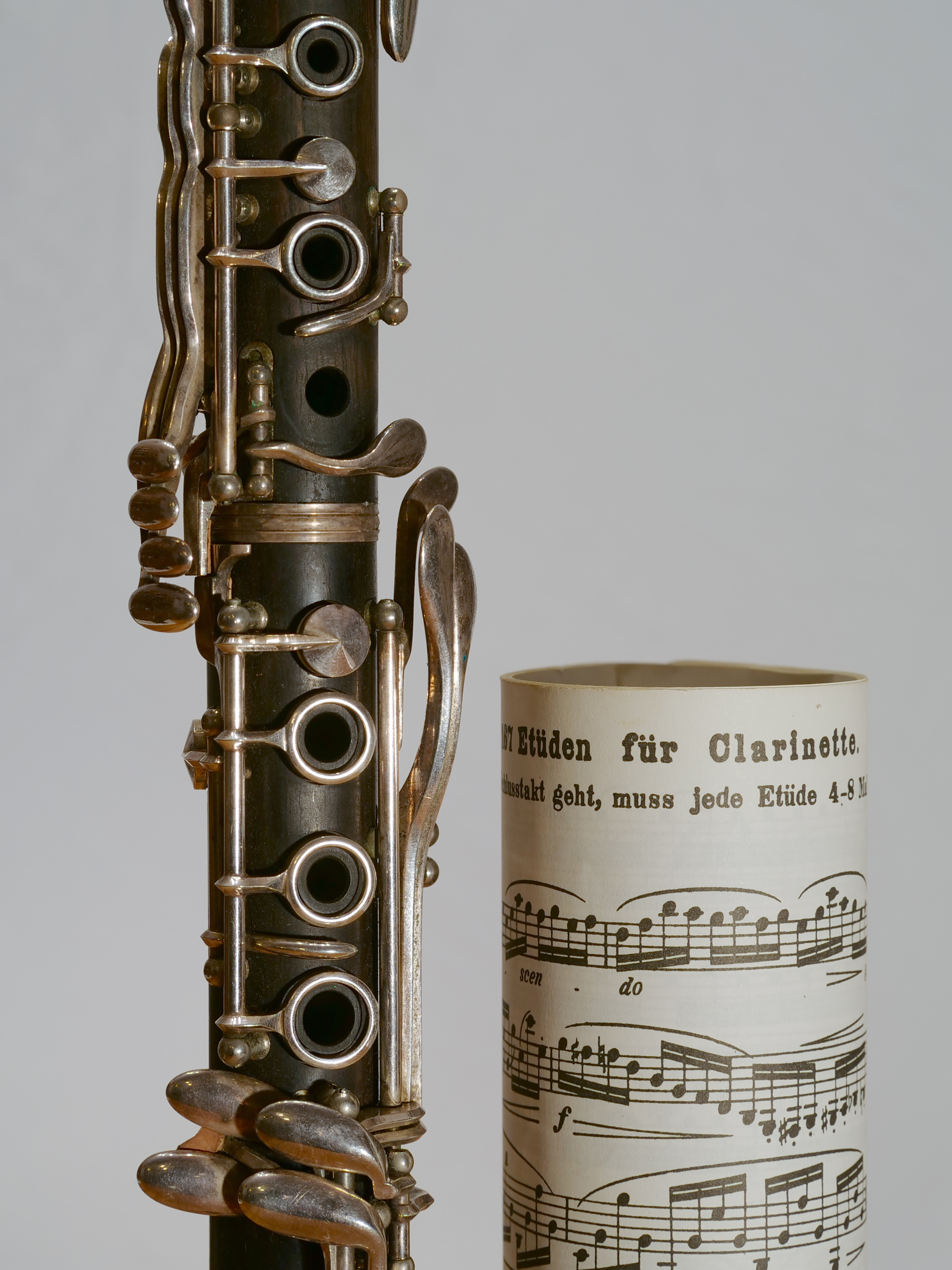
ISO 160, 1/15 s

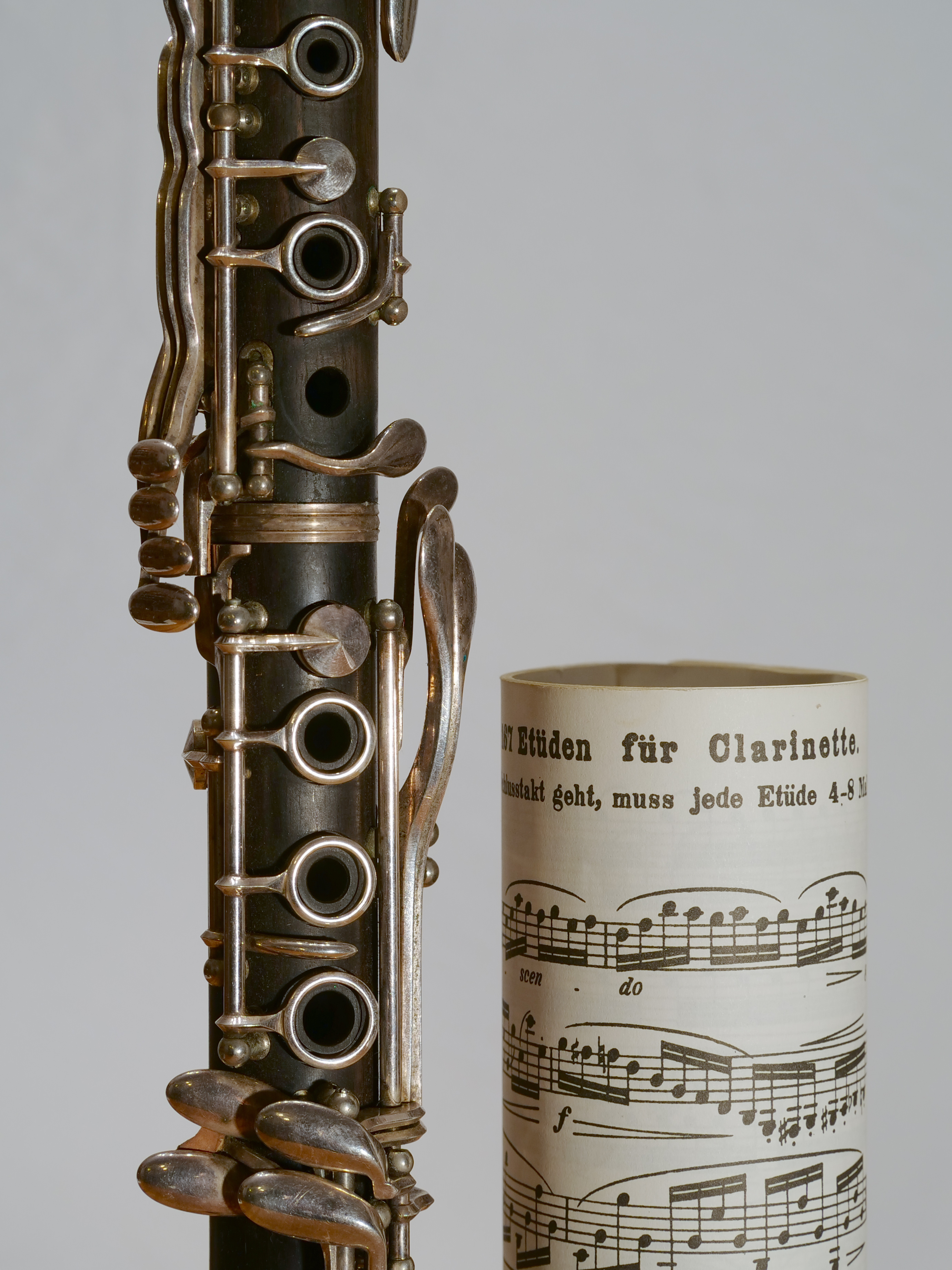
ISO 200, 1/20 s

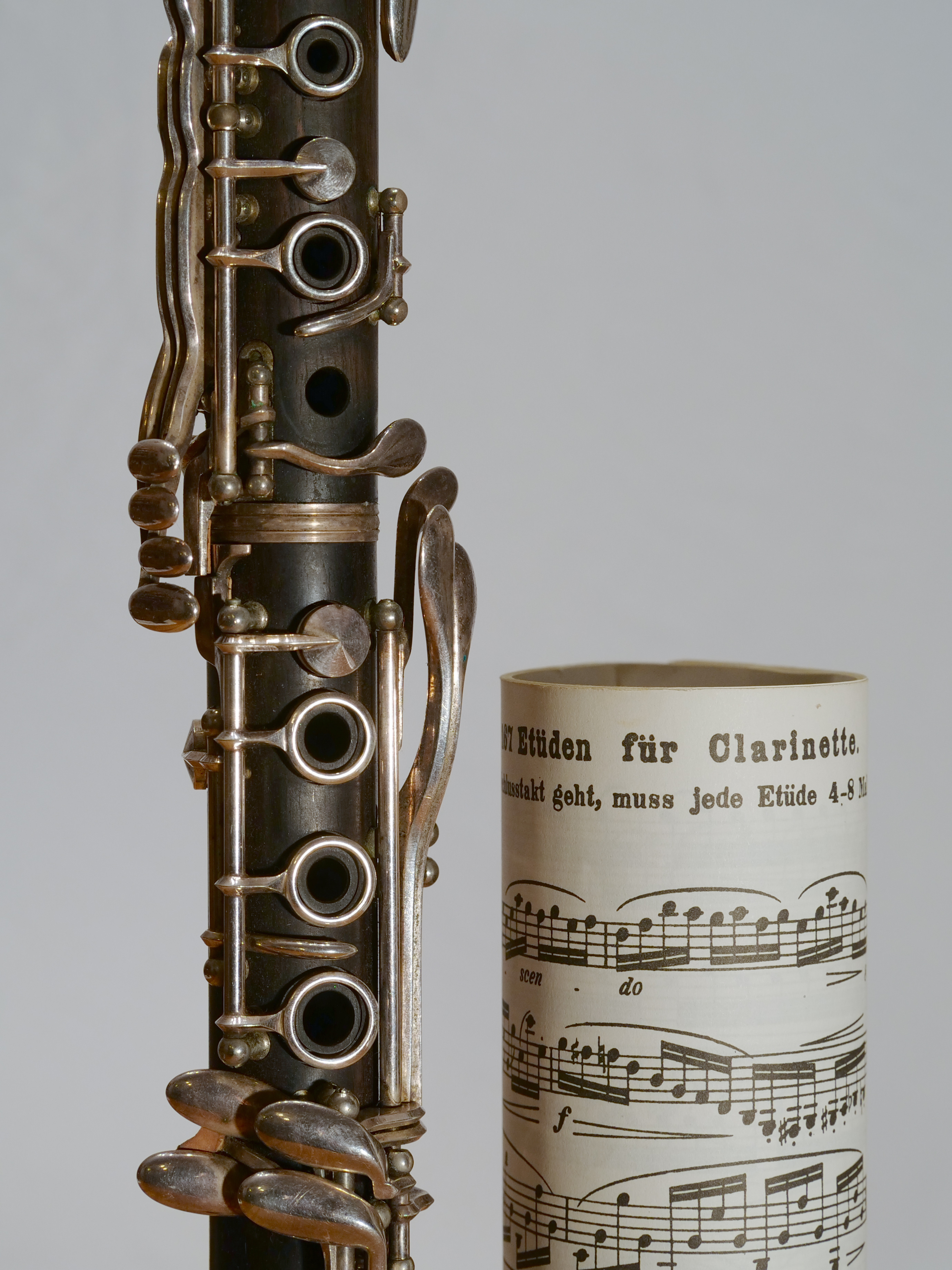
ISO 400, 1/40 s

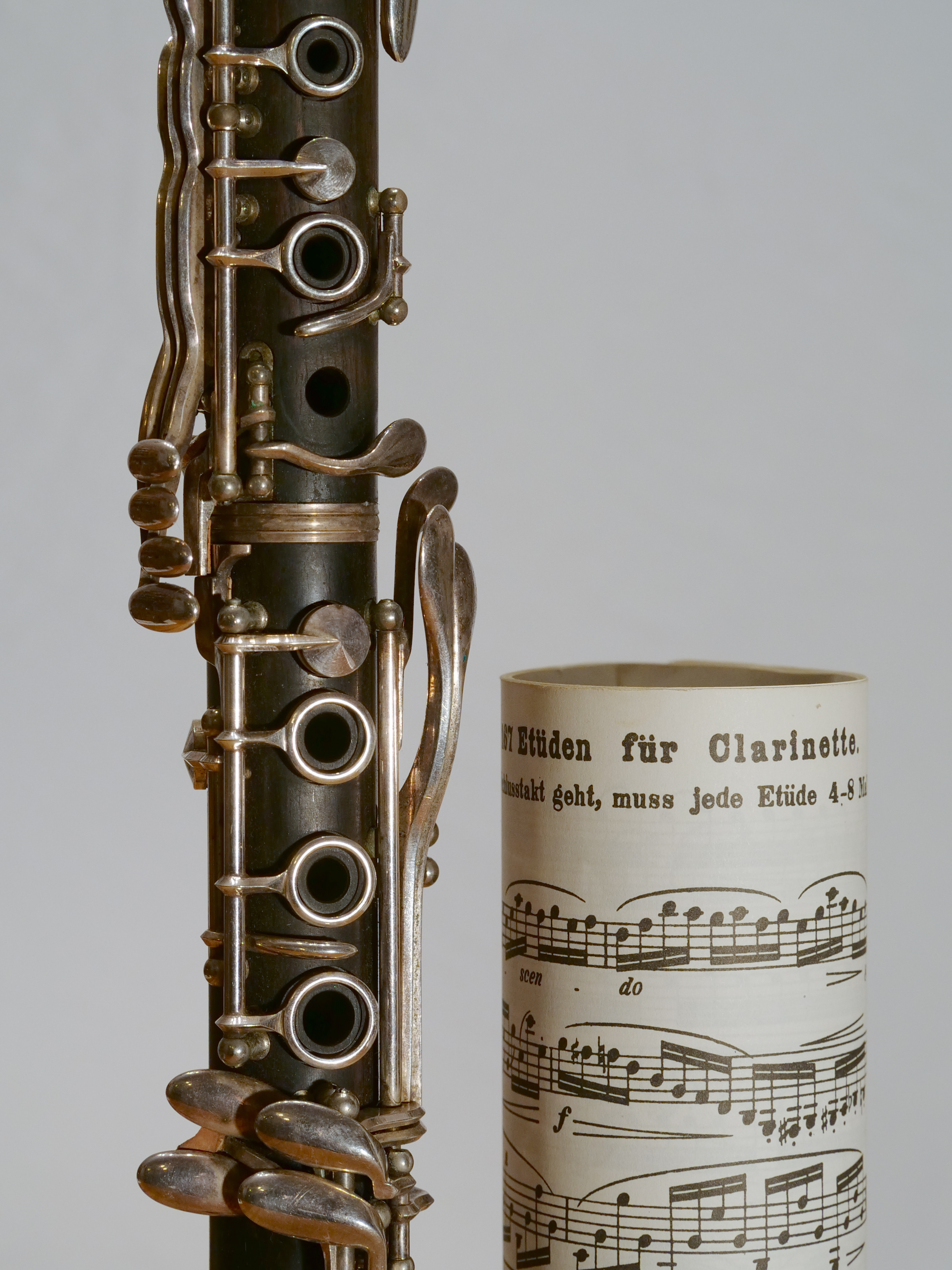
ISO 800, 1/80 s

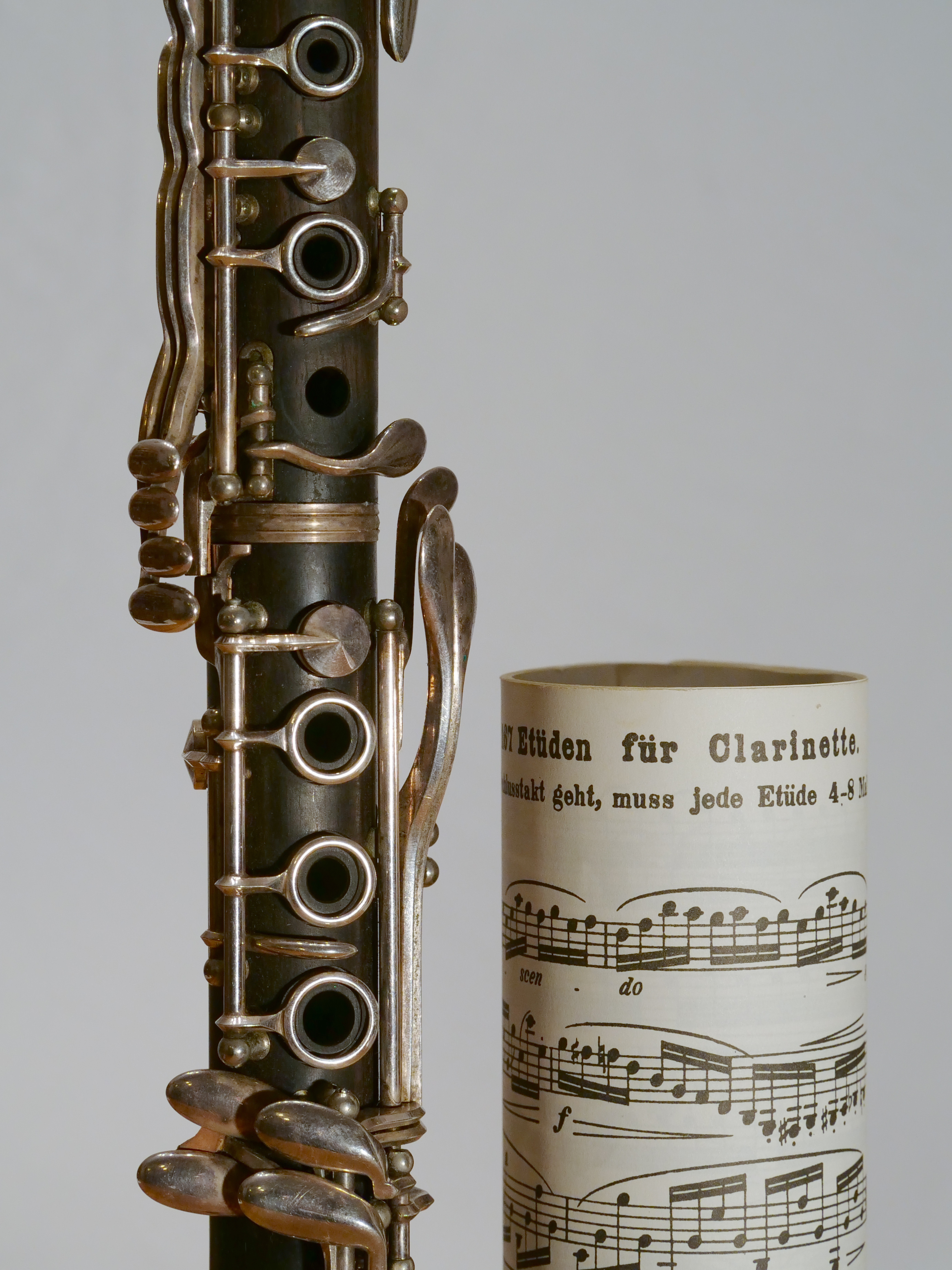
ISO 1600, 1/160 s

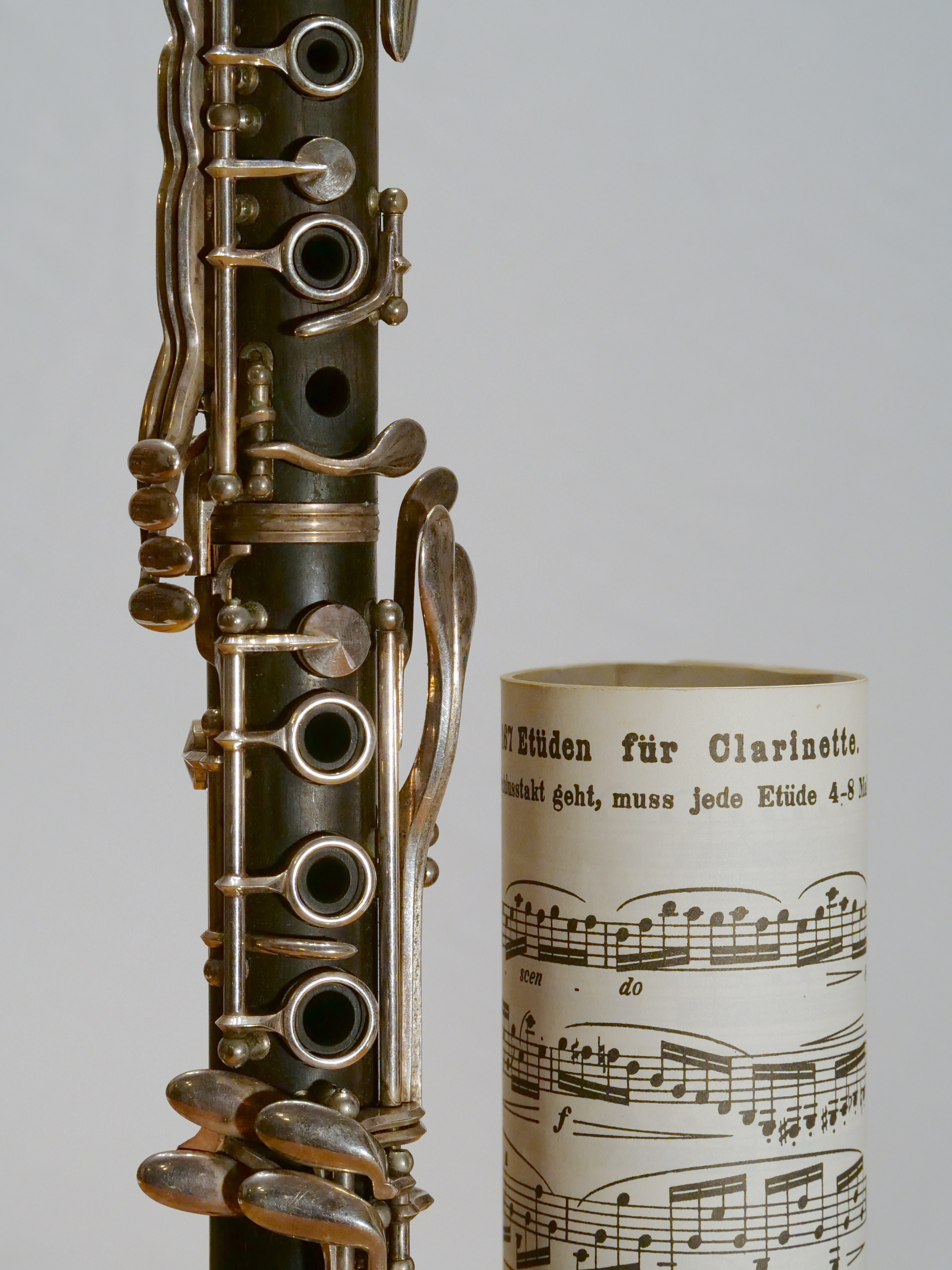
ISO 3200, 1/320 s

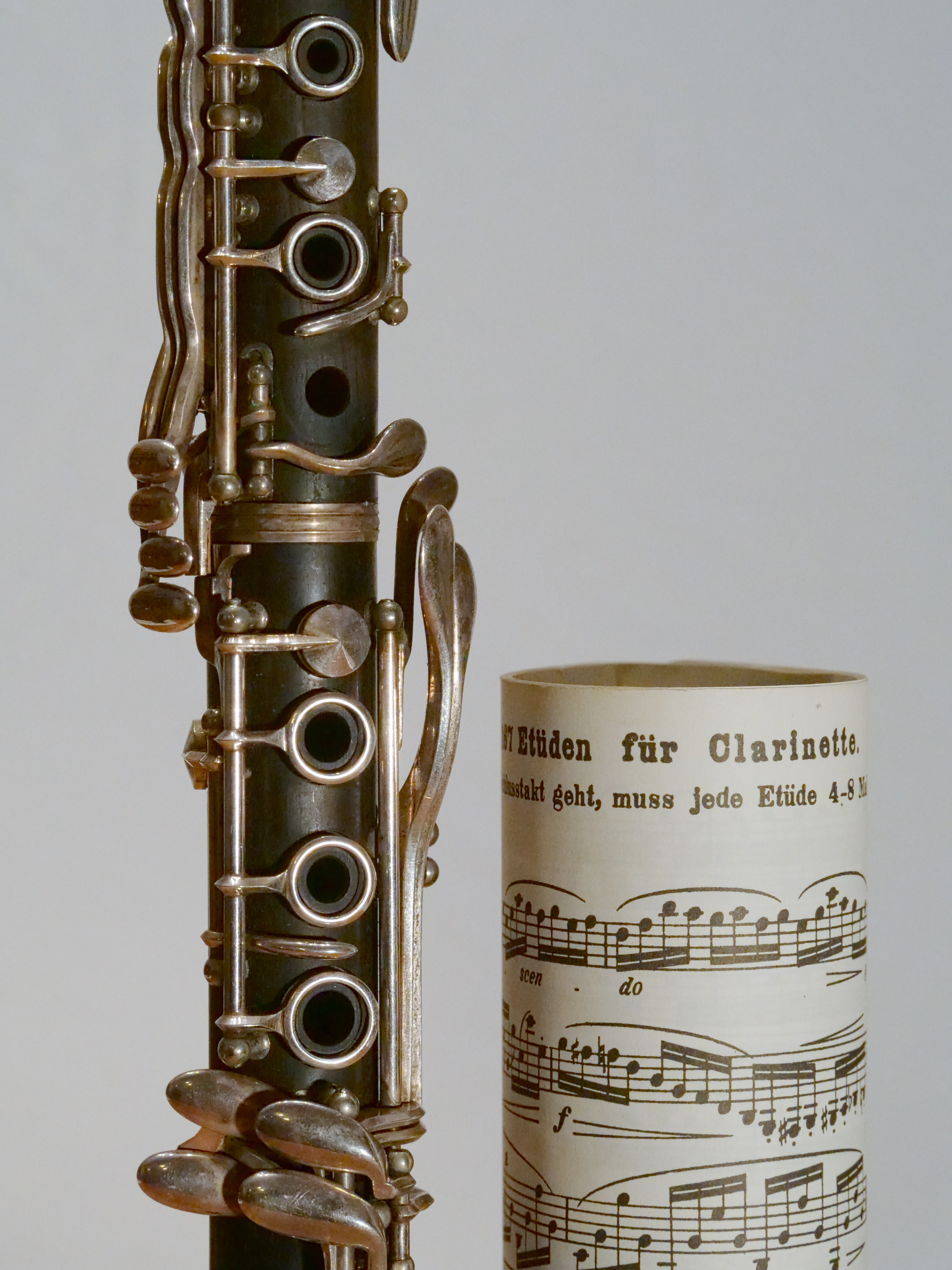
ISO 6400, 1/640 s

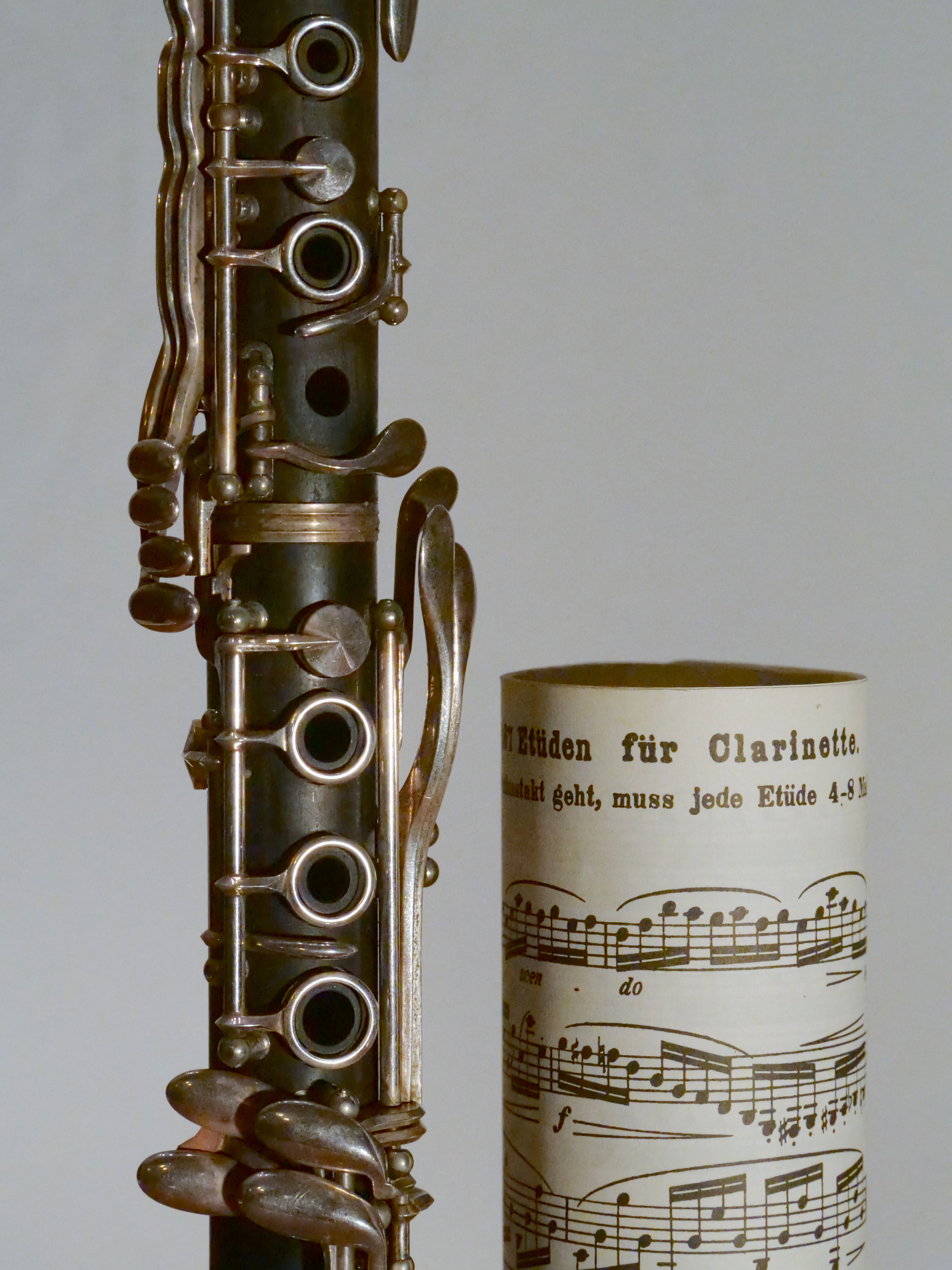
ISO 12800, 1/1300 s

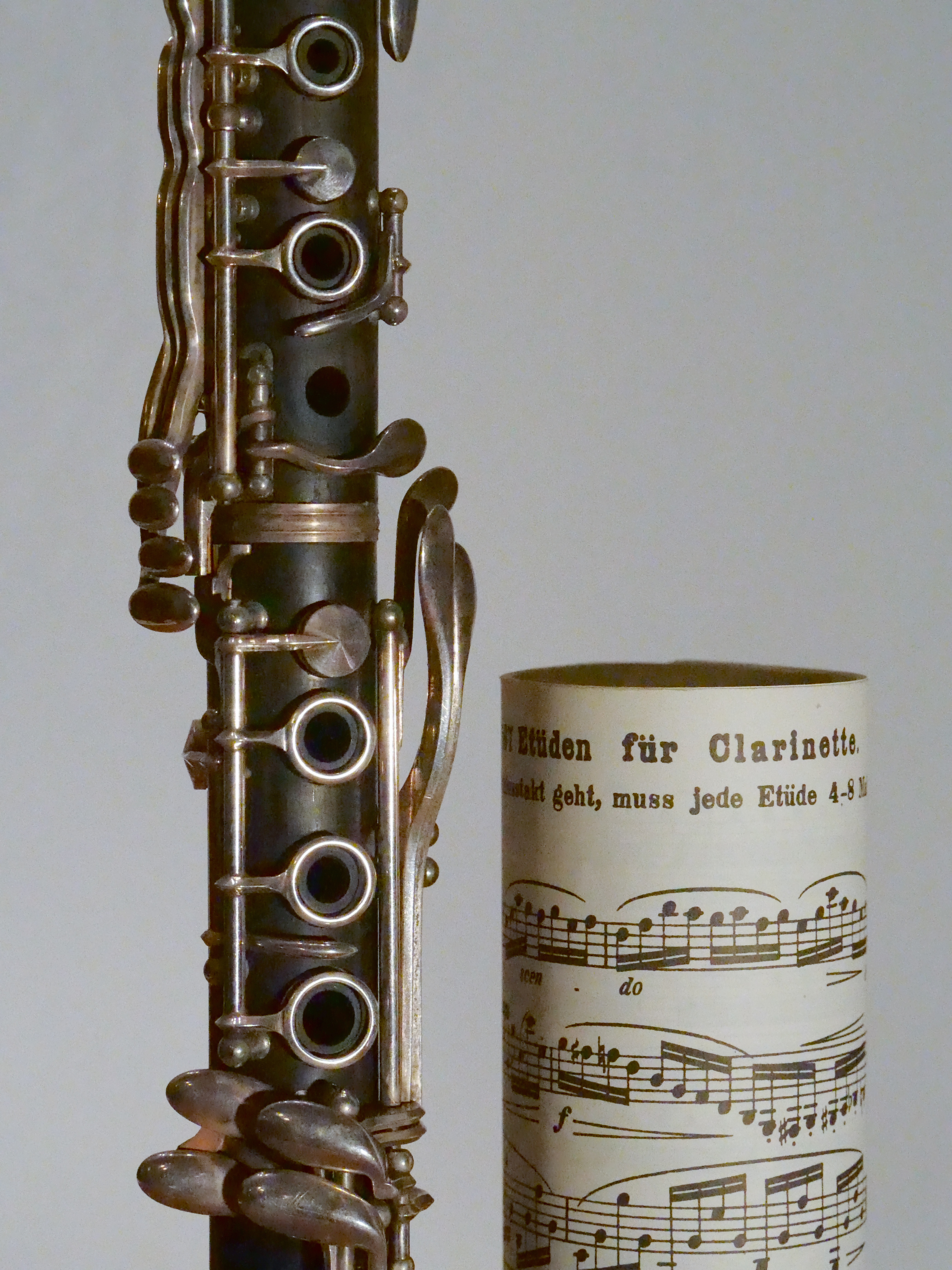
ISO 25600, 1/2500 s

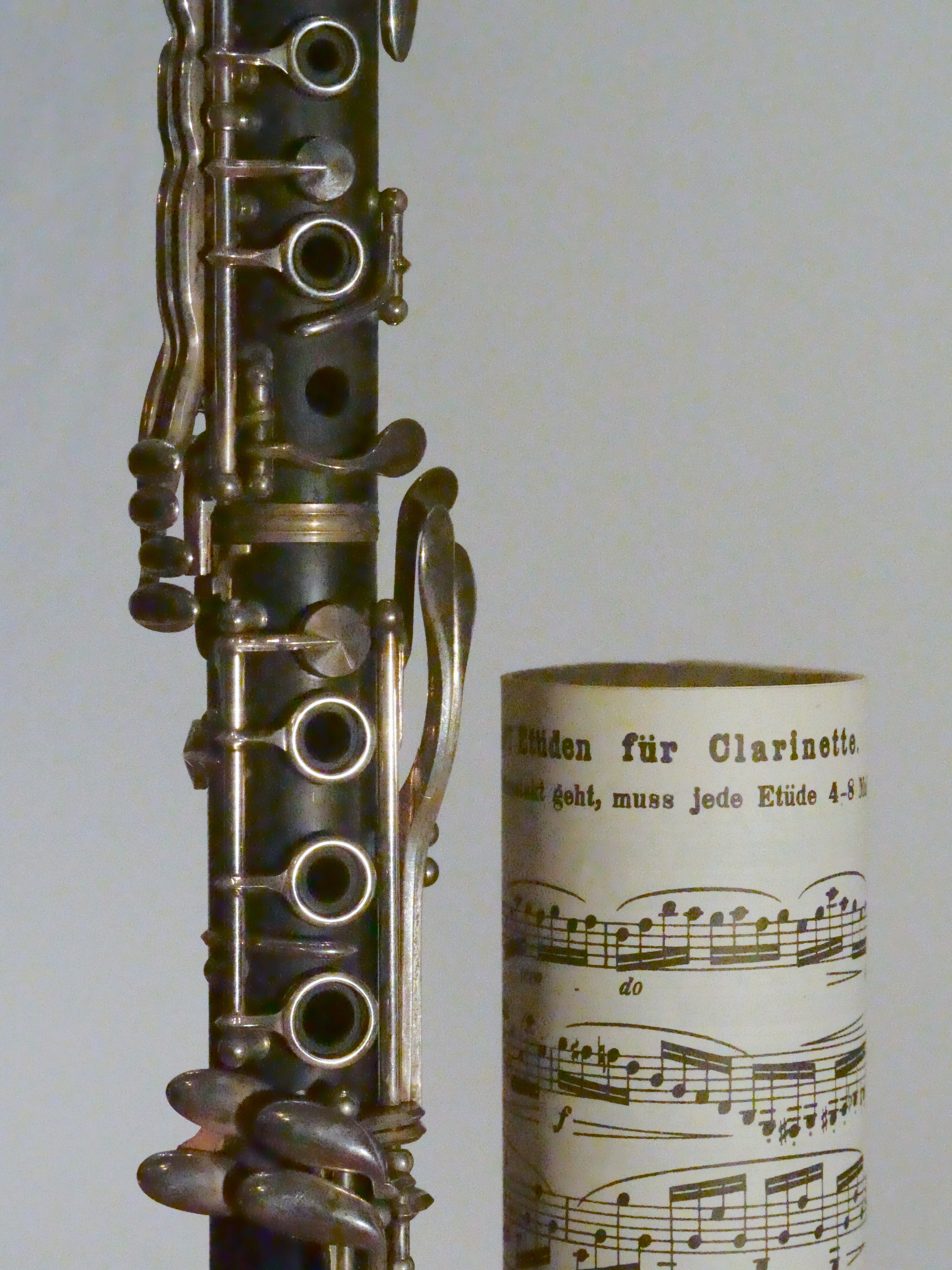
ISO 51200, 1/5000 s

== Gallery ==
Panasonic Lumix DC-GH5S

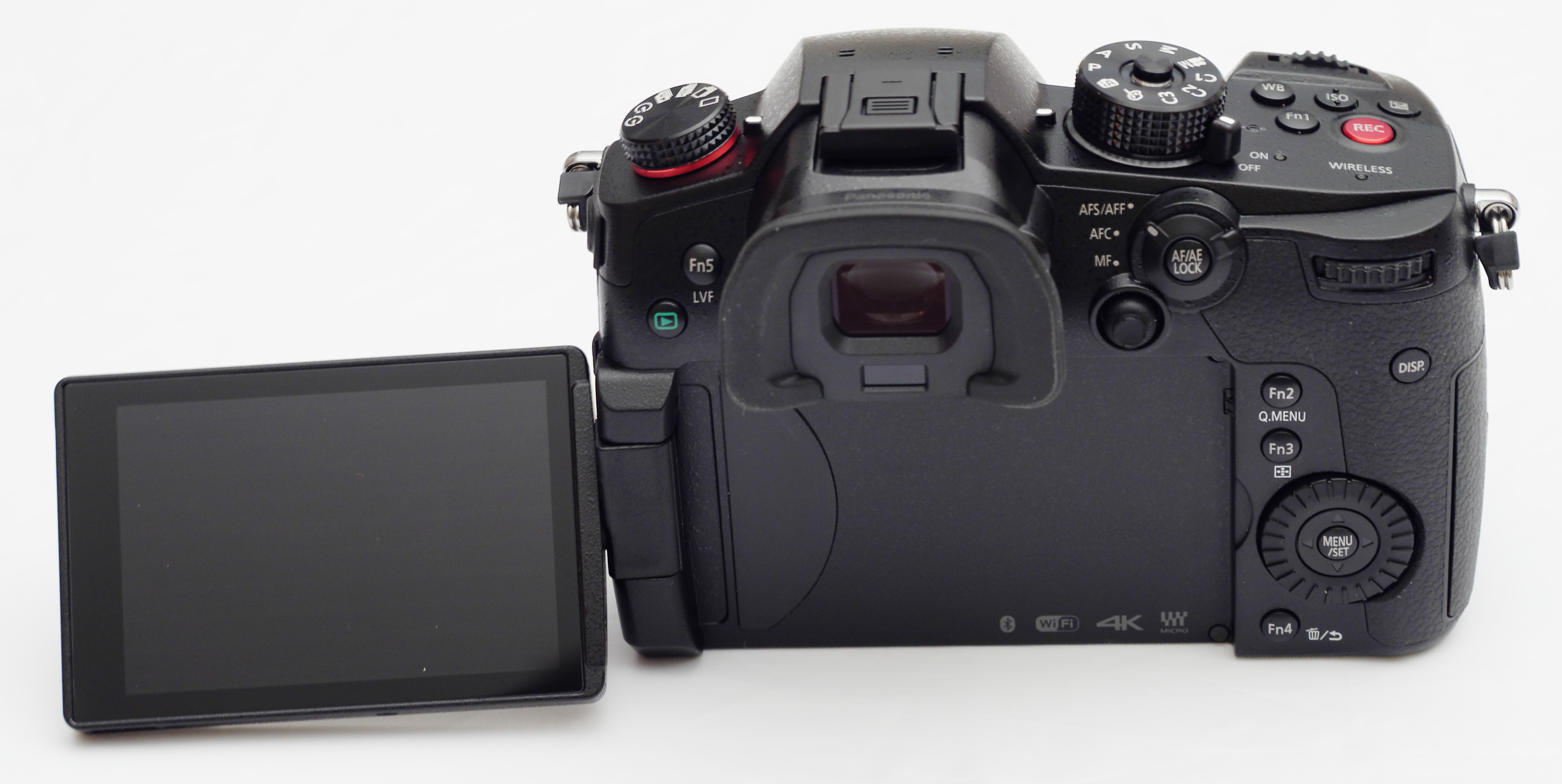
Back view with articulated monitor

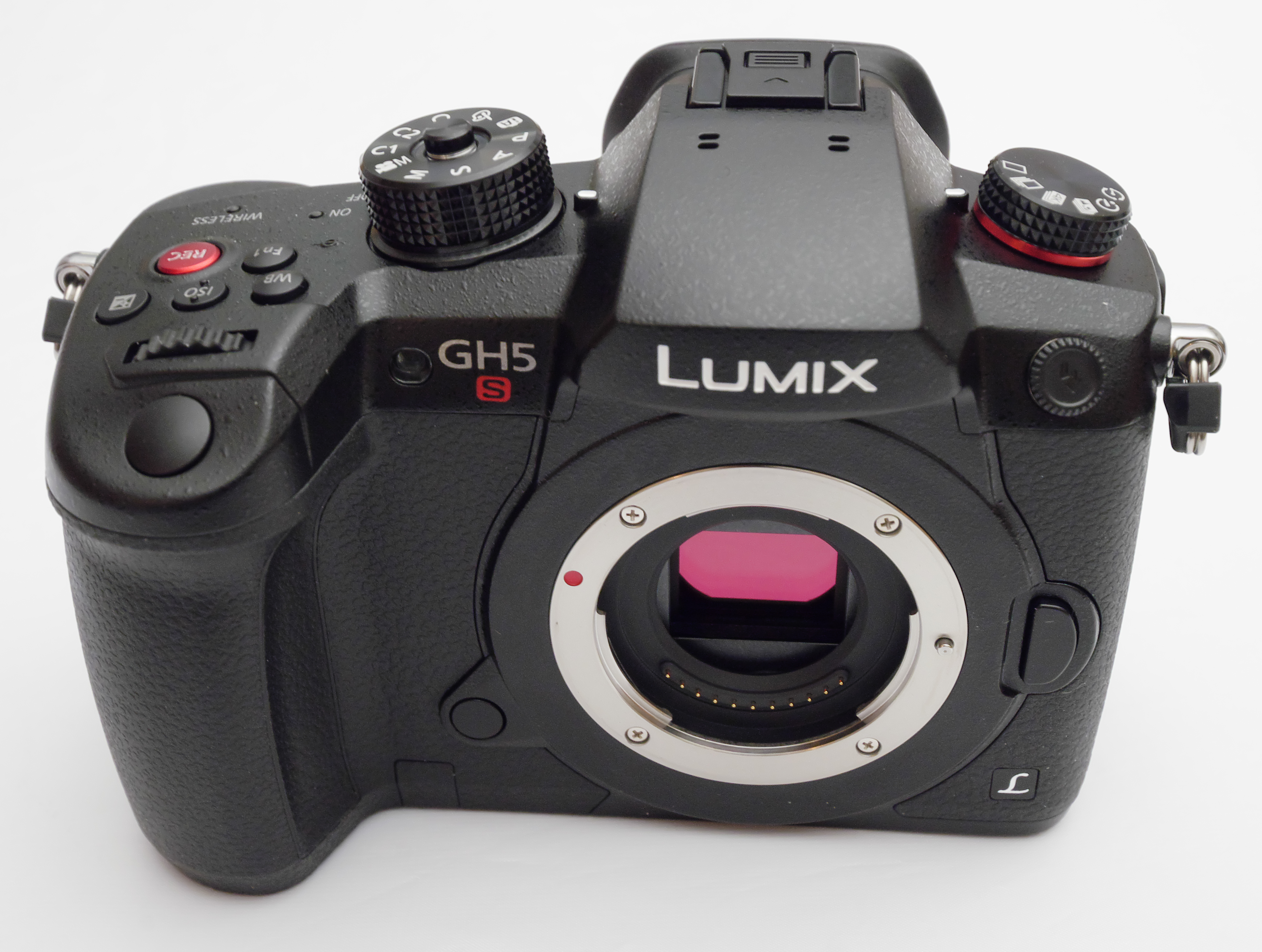
Perspective view from above

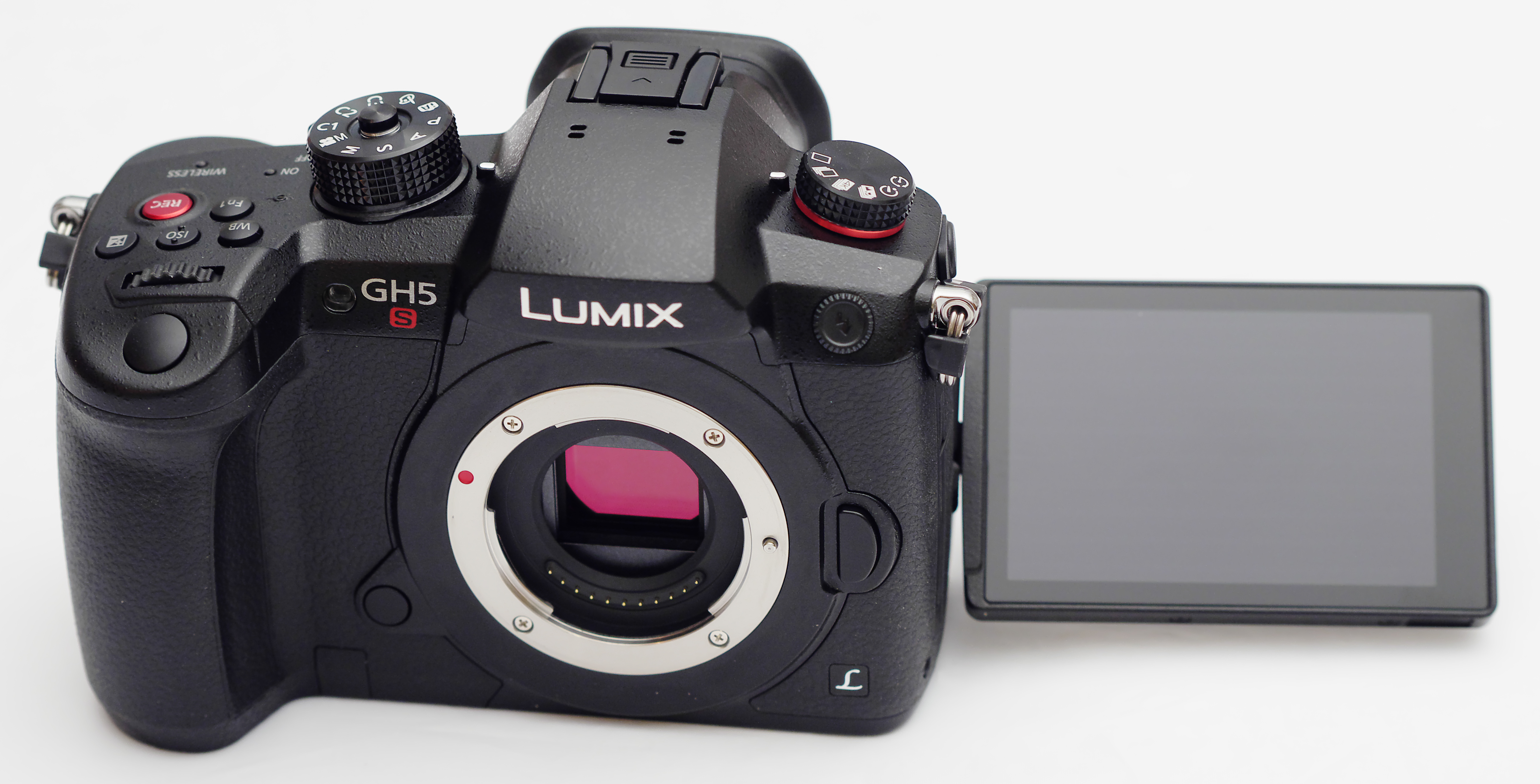
Perspective view from above with articulated monitor

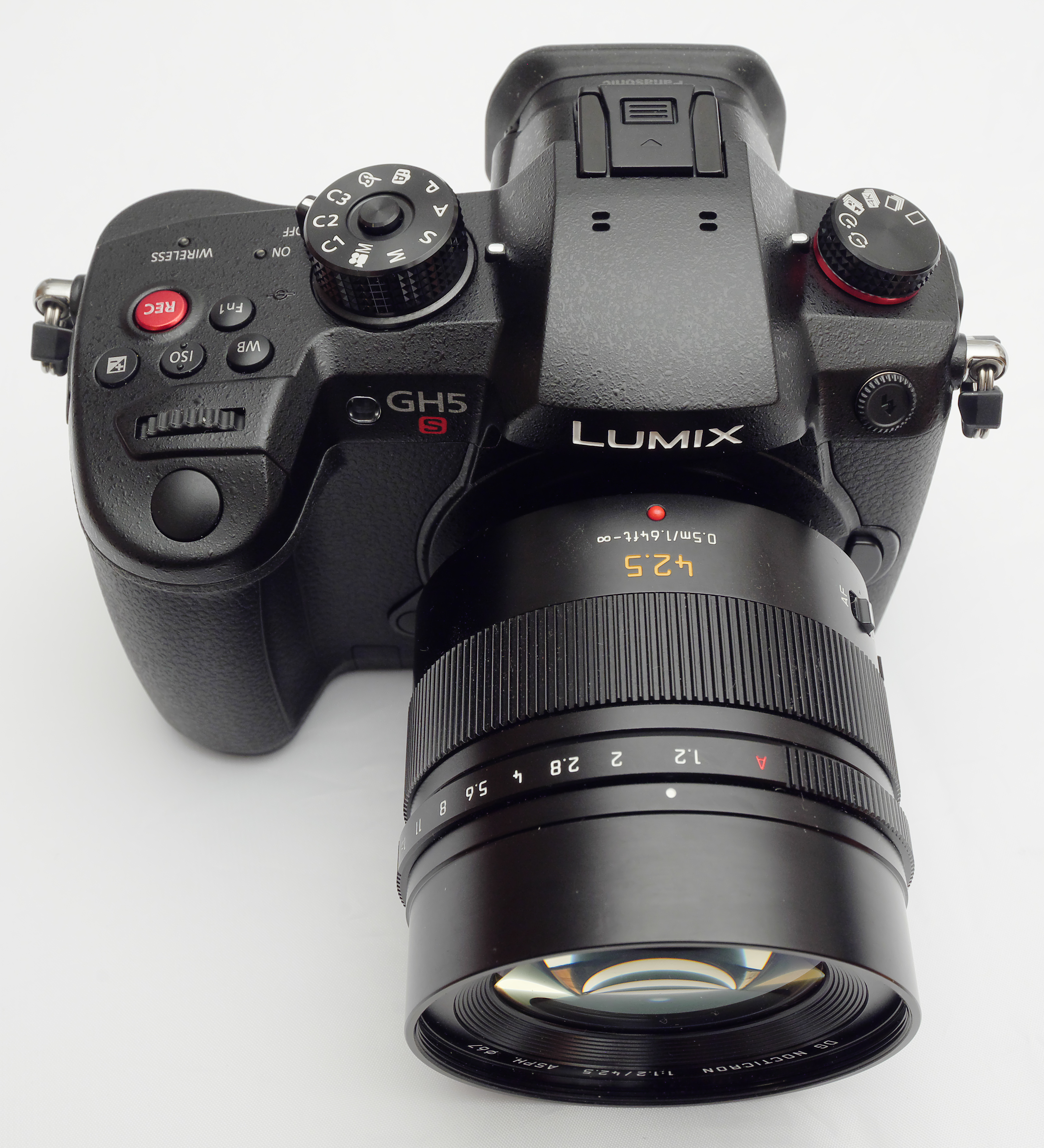
Perspective view with lens Leica Nocticron 42.5 mm f/1.2

Brand	Form	Class	2008	2009	2010	2011			2012	2013	2014	2015	2016	2017	2018	2019	2020	2021	2022	2023	2024	25
Olympus	SLR style OM-D	Professional															E-M1X ^{R}					
Olympus	SLR style OM-D	High-end									E-M1			E-M1 II ^{R}			E-M1 III ^{R}					
Olympus	SLR style OM-D	Advanced							E-M5			E-M5 II ^{R}					E-M5 III ^{R}					
Olympus	SLR style OM-D	Mid-range									E-M10		E-M10 II		E-M10 III			E-M10 IV				
Olympus	Rangefinder style PEN	Mid-range		E-P1	E-P2		E-P3				E-P5		PEN-F ^{R}									
Olympus	Rangefinder style PEN	Upper-entry			E-PL1	E-PL2		E-PL3	E-PL5		E-PL6	E-PL7		E-PL8	E-PL9		E-PL10					
Olympus	Rangefinder style PEN	Entry-level					E-PM1		E-PM2													
Olympus	remote													Air								
OM System	SLR style	Professional																	OM-1 ^{R}		OM-1 II ^{R}	
OM System	SLR style	High-end																				OM-3 ^{R}
OM System	SLR style	Advanced																		OM-5 ^{R}		
OM System	PEN	Mid-range																	E-P7			
Panasonic	SLR style	High-end Video													GH5S				GH6 ^{R}			GH7 ^{R}
Panasonic	SLR style	High-end Photo													G9 ^{R}						G9 II ^{R}	
Panasonic	SLR style	High-end		GH1		GH2			GH3		GH4				GH5				GH5II			
Panasonic	SLR style	Mid-range		G1	G2		G3		G5		G6		G7	G80/G85			G90/G95					
Panasonic	SLR style	Entry-level			G10													G100			G100D	
Panasonic	Rangefinder style	Advanced							GX1		GX7		GX8		GX9							
Panasonic	Rangefinder style	Mid-range									GM1	GM5	GX80/GX85									
Panasonic	Rangefinder style	Entry-level			GF1	GF2	GF3		GF5		GF6	GF7	GF8	GX800/GX850/GF9		GX880/GF10/GF90						
Panasonic	Camcorder	Professional							AG-AF104													
Kodak	Rangefinder style	Entry-level										S-1										
DJI	Drone	.												Zenmuse X5S								
DJI	Drone	.												Zenmuse X5								
YI	Rangefinder style	Entry-level												M1								
Yongnuo	Rangefinder style	Android camera															YN450M		YN455			
Blackmagic Design	Rangefinder style	High-End Video							Cinema Camera													
Blackmagic Design	Rangefinder style	High-End Video									Pocket Cinema Camera					Pocket Cinema Camera 4K						
Blackmagic Design		High-End Video										Micro Cinema Camera									Micro Studio Camera 4K G2	
Z CAM	Cinema	Advanced											E1			E2						
Z CAM	Cinema	Mid-Range																E2-M4				
Z CAM	Cinema	Entry-Level															E2C					
JVC	Camcorder	Professional										GY-LS300										
SVS-Vistek		Industrial							EVO Tracer													
