= Panasonic Lumix DC-GH5M2 =

Mirrorless camera

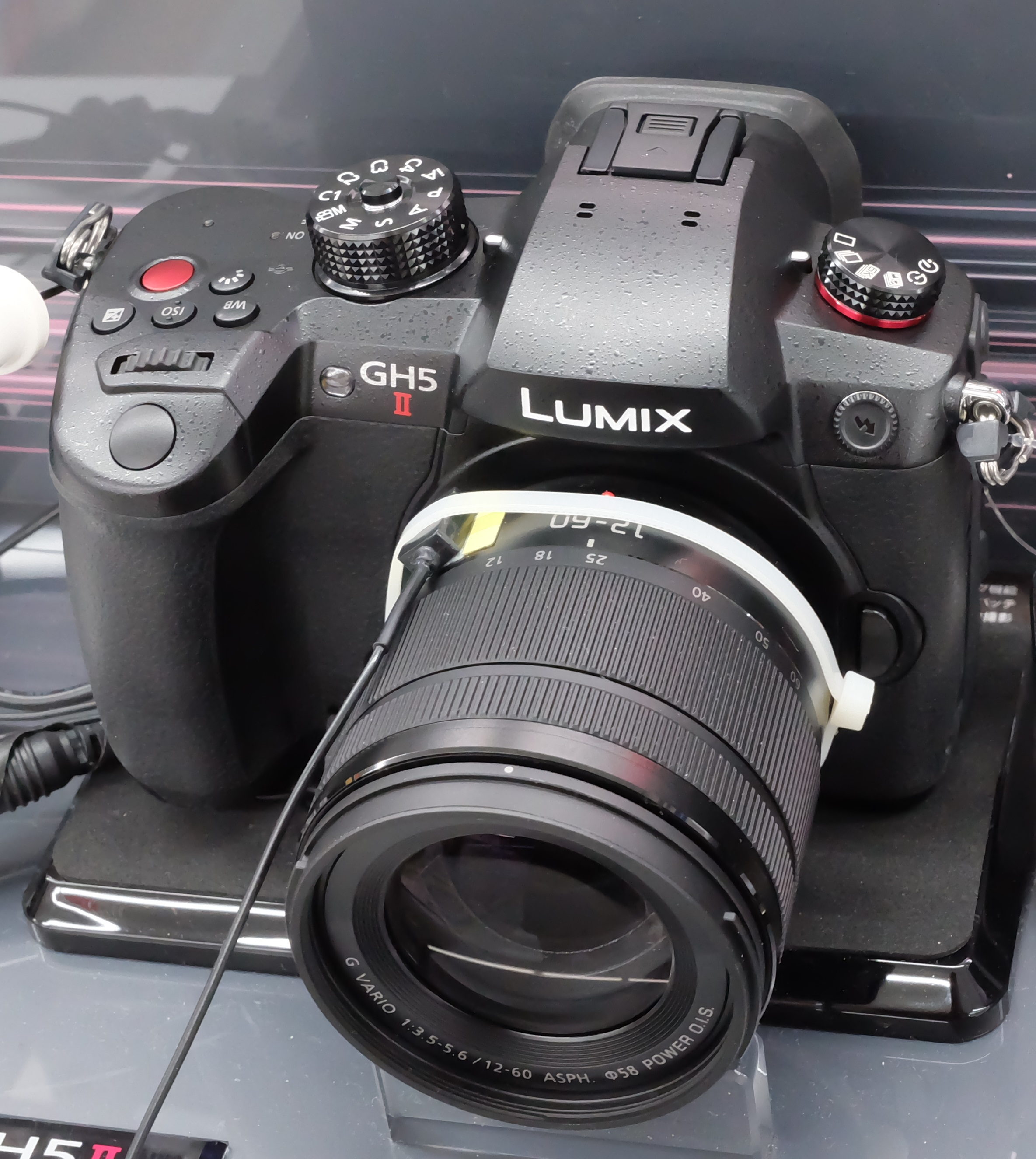

Overview
- Maker: Panasonic Holdings Corporation
- Type: Mirrorless Interchangeable-Lens Camera
- Released: June 25, 2021; 4 years ago

Lens
- Lens mount: Micro Four Thirds system mount

Sensor/medium
- Sensor: 4/3-type
- Sensor type: Live MOS
- Sensor size: 17.3 x 13 mm (4:3 aspect ratio)
- Sensor maker: Sony
- Maximum resolution: 5184 x 3888 px (20.33megapixels)
- Film speed: ISO 200-25600, extendable to 100
- Recording medium: 2x SD / SDHC / SDXC UHS-II

Focusing
- Focus: Switchable Auto and Manual
- Focus modes: AF-C (Continuous-Servo), AF-F (Flexible AF), AF-S (Single Servo AF), Manual Focus
- Focus areas: 225 Contrast Detection AF

Exposure/metering
- Exposure modes: Program AE; Aperture Priority, Shutter priority, Manual
- Metering modes: Center-weighted, Multiple, Spot

Flash
- Flash synchronization: 1/250
- Flash bracketing: ±5 EV in 1/3 EV steps

Shutter
- Shutter: Focal-plane shutter / Electronic shutter
- Shutter speed range: 1/16000s - 60s, BULB
- Continuous shooting: 12 fps

Viewfinder
- Viewfinder: OLED viewfinder; 3.6M dots
- Viewfinder magnification: 0.76x

Image processing
- Image processor: Venus Engine
- White balance: Auto, Cloudy, Shade, Incandescent, Flash, Daylight, White Set 1/2/3/4, Custom WB based on color temperature

General
- Video recording: AVCHD / MP4 / MOV; 6K,4K, Full HD
- LCD screen: 3.2", 184M Dots, free-angle with touchscreen
- Battery: 7.2v 1860 mAh Lithium-ion battery pack
- Data port(s): Wi-Fi, Bluetooth, full-sized HDMI Type-A, USB 3.1 Gen1 5Gbit/s,
- Body features: 5-axis in-body image stabilization, DUAL I.S.
- Dimensions: 138.5×98.1×87.4 mm (5.45×3.86×3.44 in)
- Weight: 647 g (23 oz)(body); 727g(with battery, one SD card)
- Made in: China

Chronology
- Predecessor: Lumix GH5

The Panasonic Lumix DC-GH5M2, known as Lumix GH5II, is a mirrorless interchangeable-lens camera with a Micro Four Thirds mount, released by Panasonic on 25 June 2021. DC-GH5M2 evolved the video recording function that was very popular with the DC-GH5 and resolved issues with autofocus and live streaming. The company has also announced that it will be enhancing its wired networking capabilities with a firmware update that is planned for sometime in 2021. It will also support USB tethering for direct connection to smartphones and IP streaming via LAN. Dual SD card slots and a full magnesium alloy body with dustproof, splashproof, and low temperature resistance specifications are also inherited from the DC-GH5, and USB charging is newly supported. There is no difference in appearance from the DC-GH5, and the weight difference is only 2 grams.

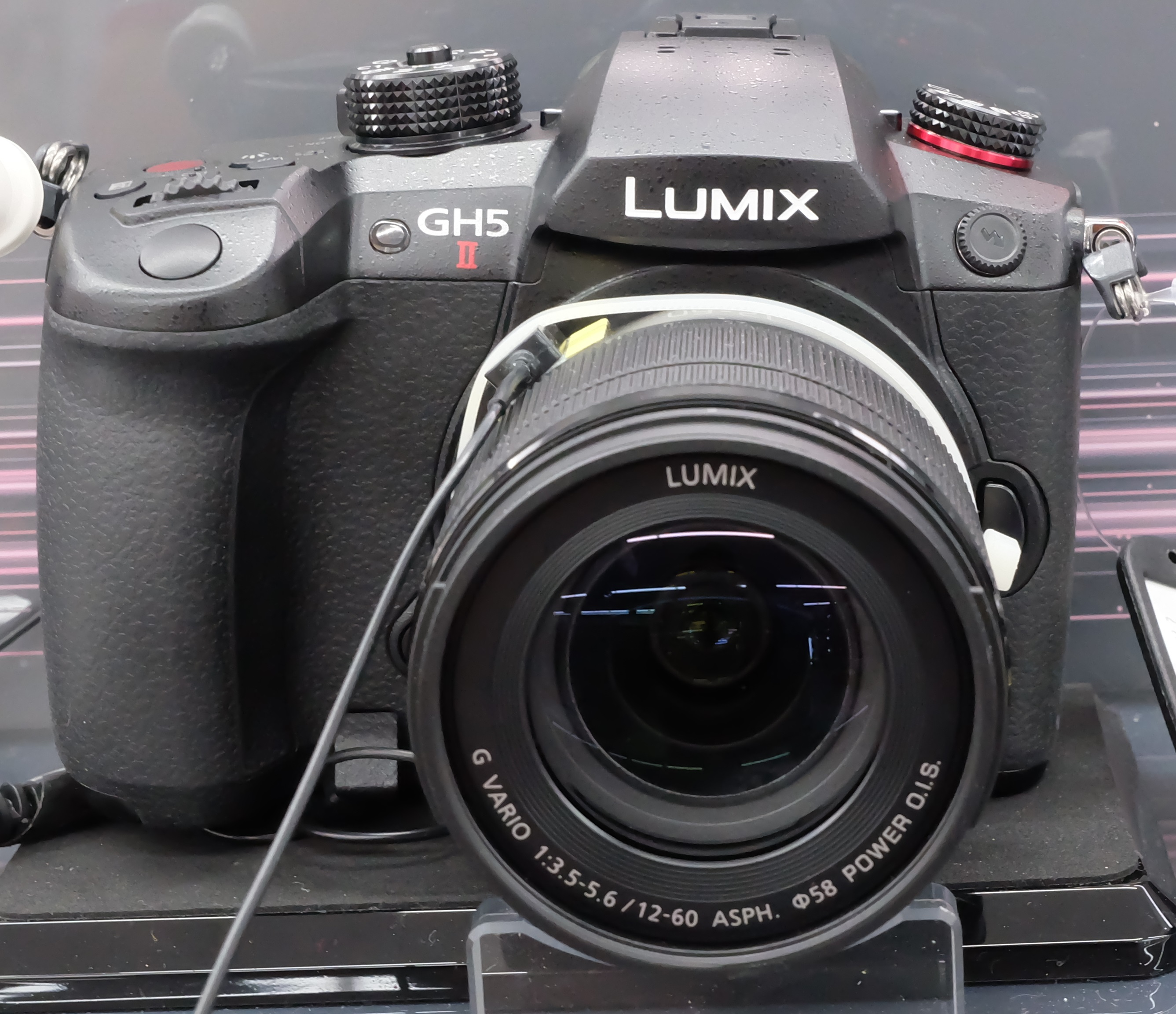

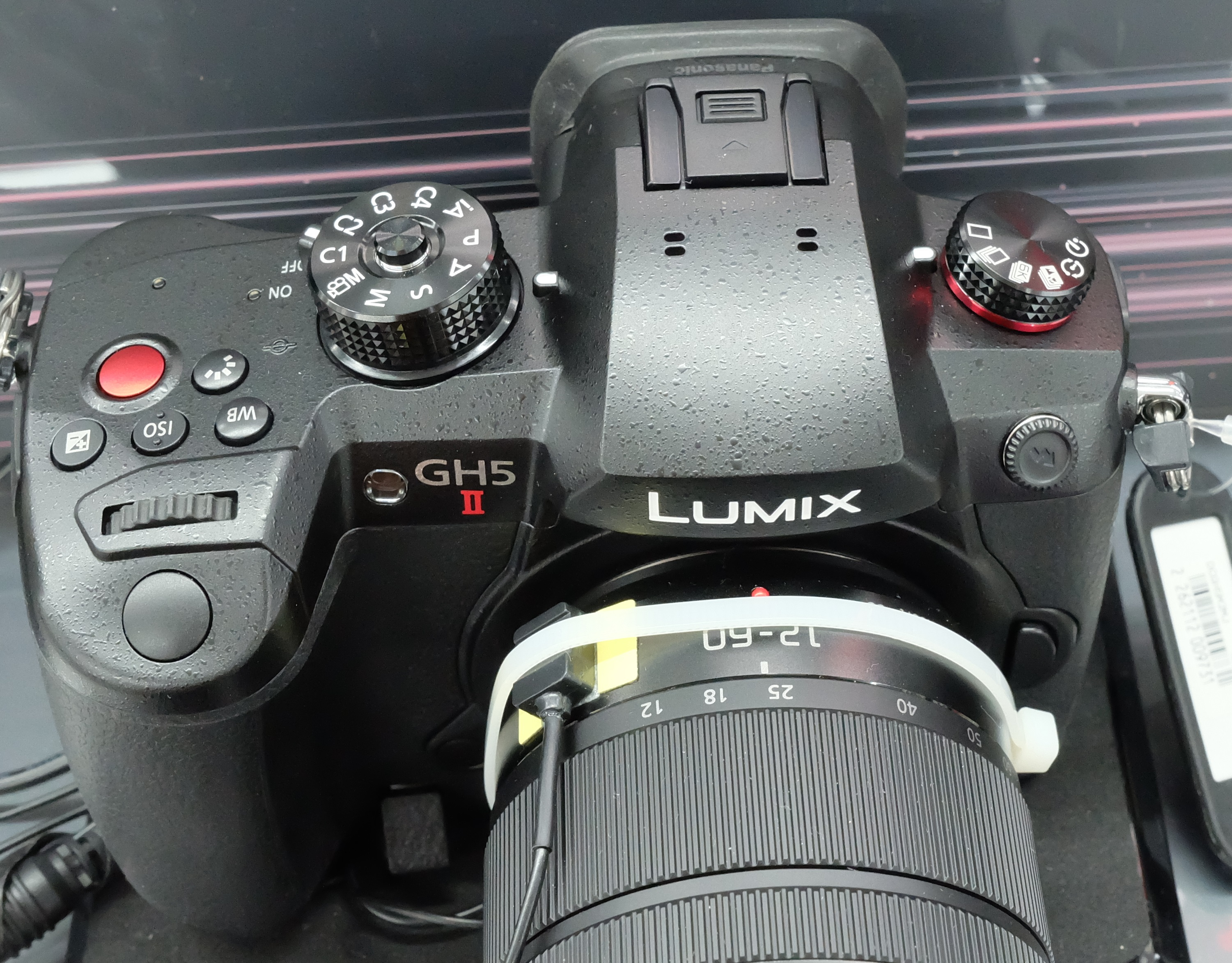

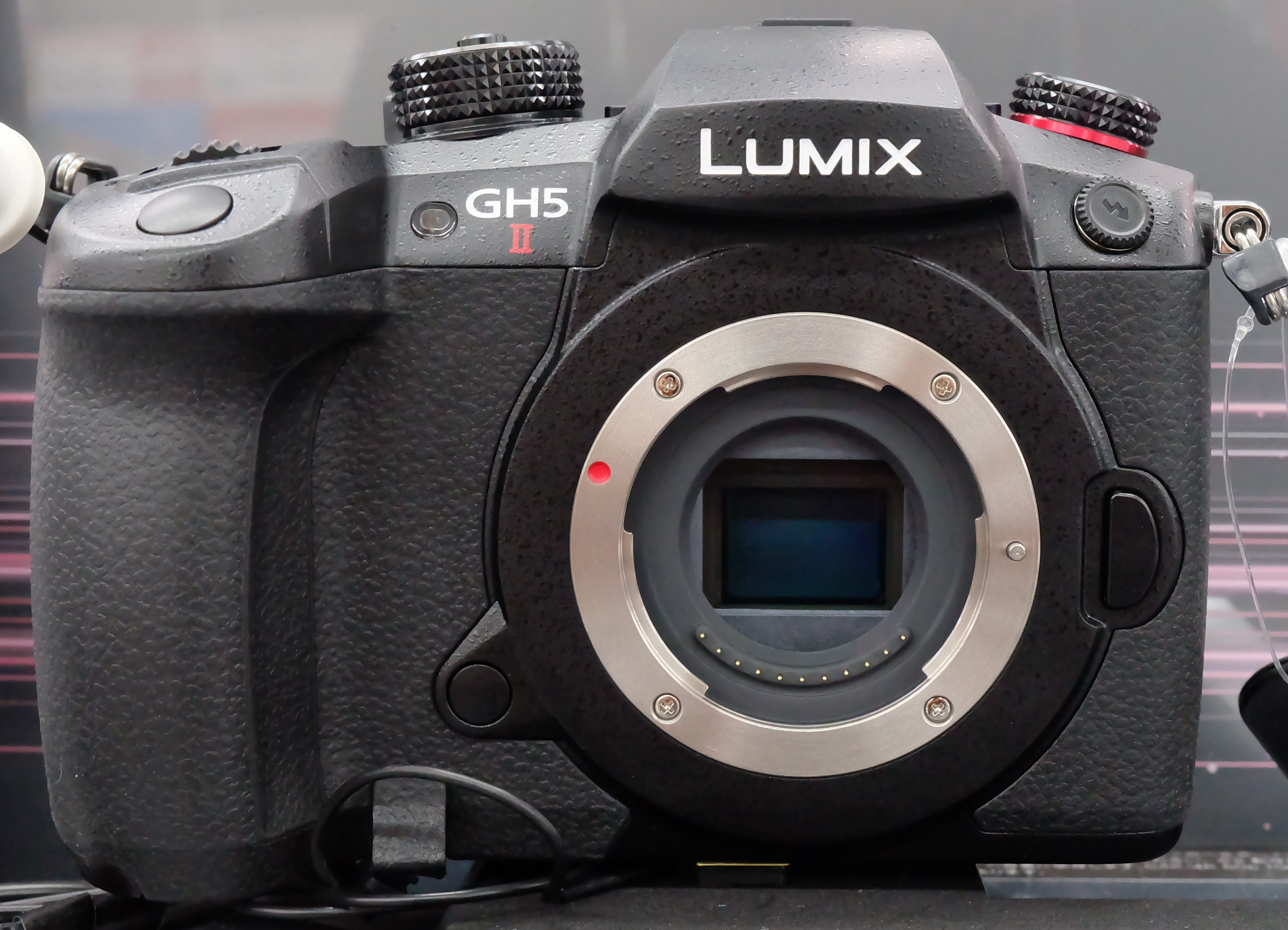

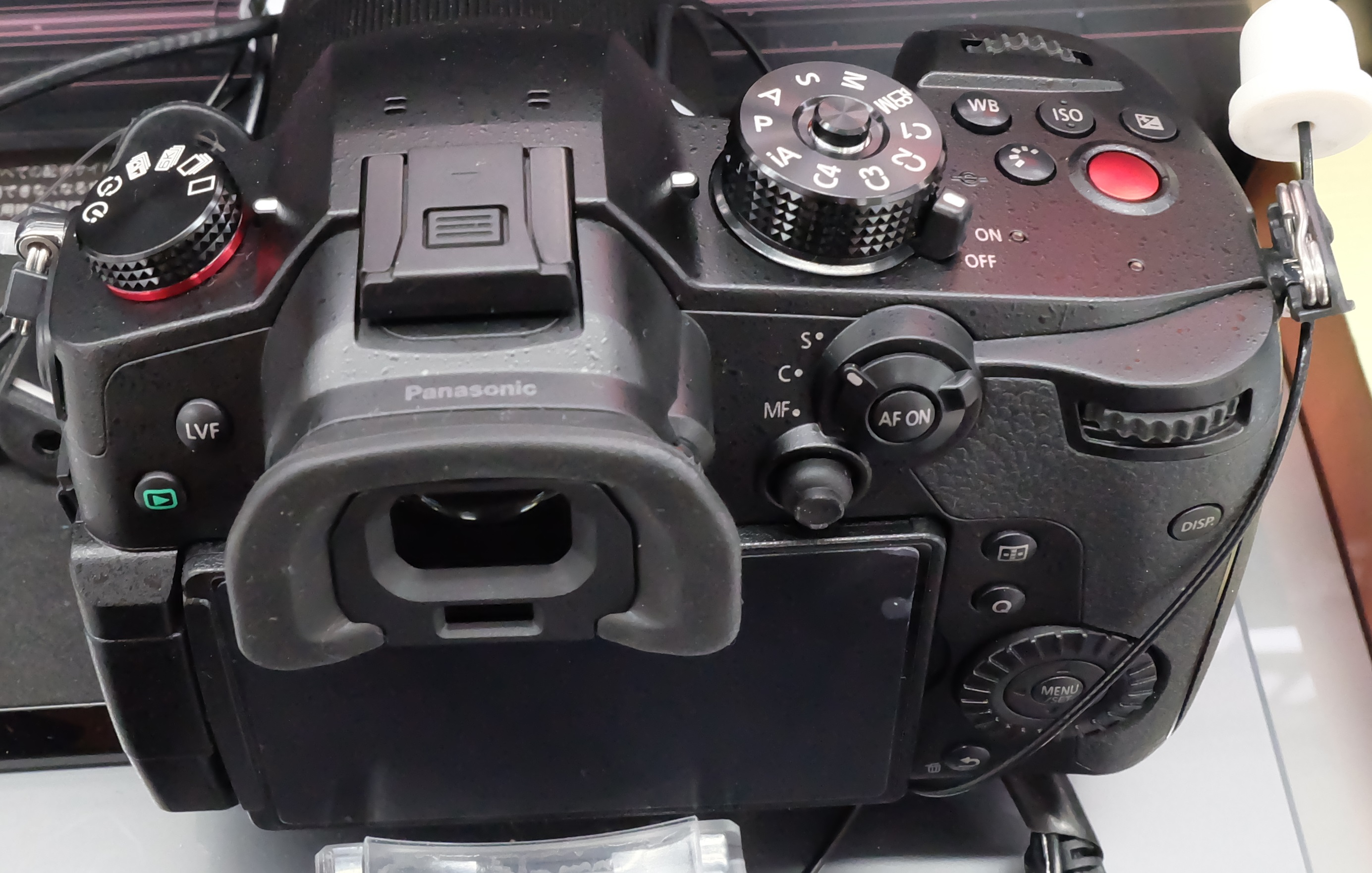

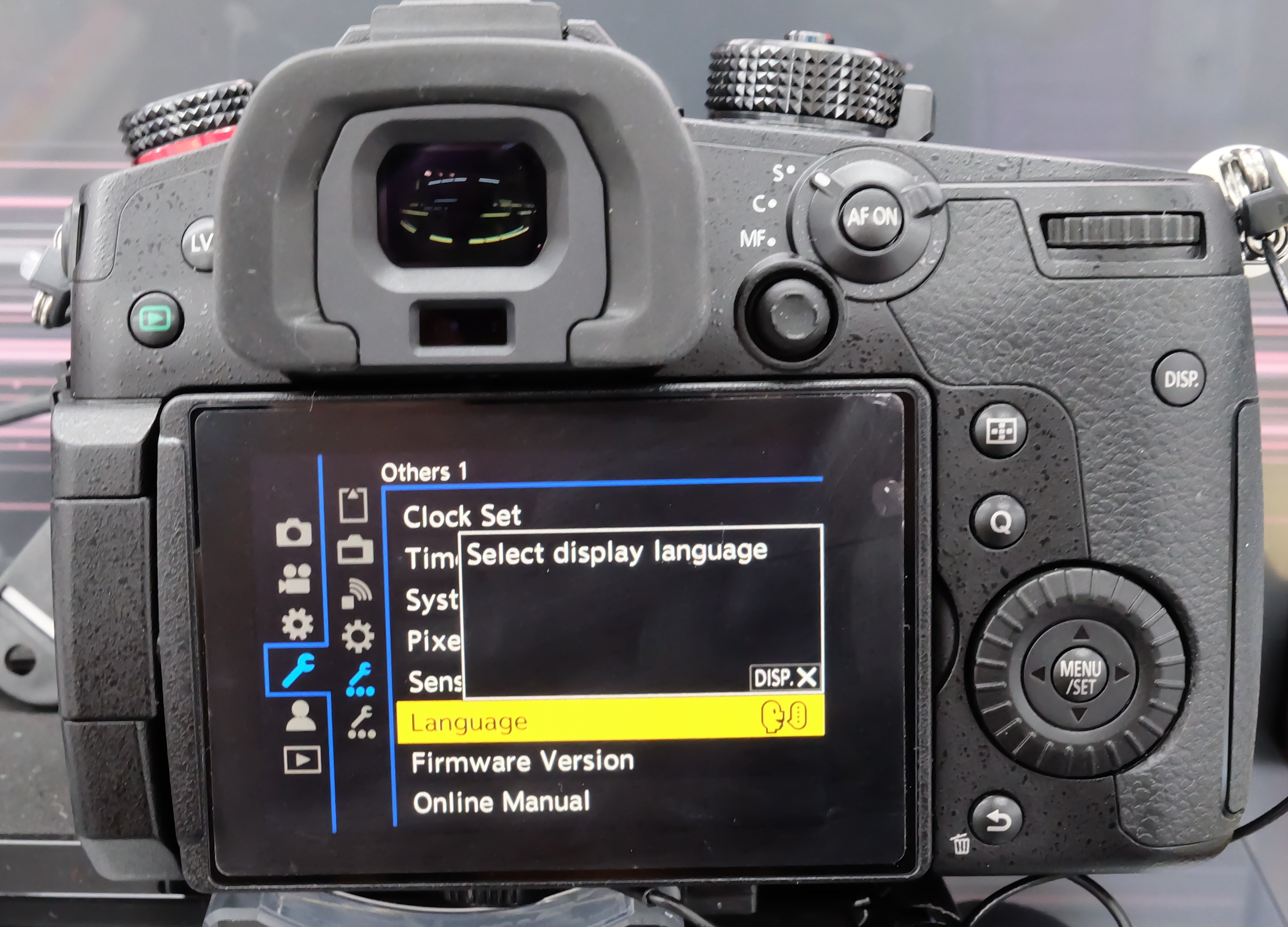

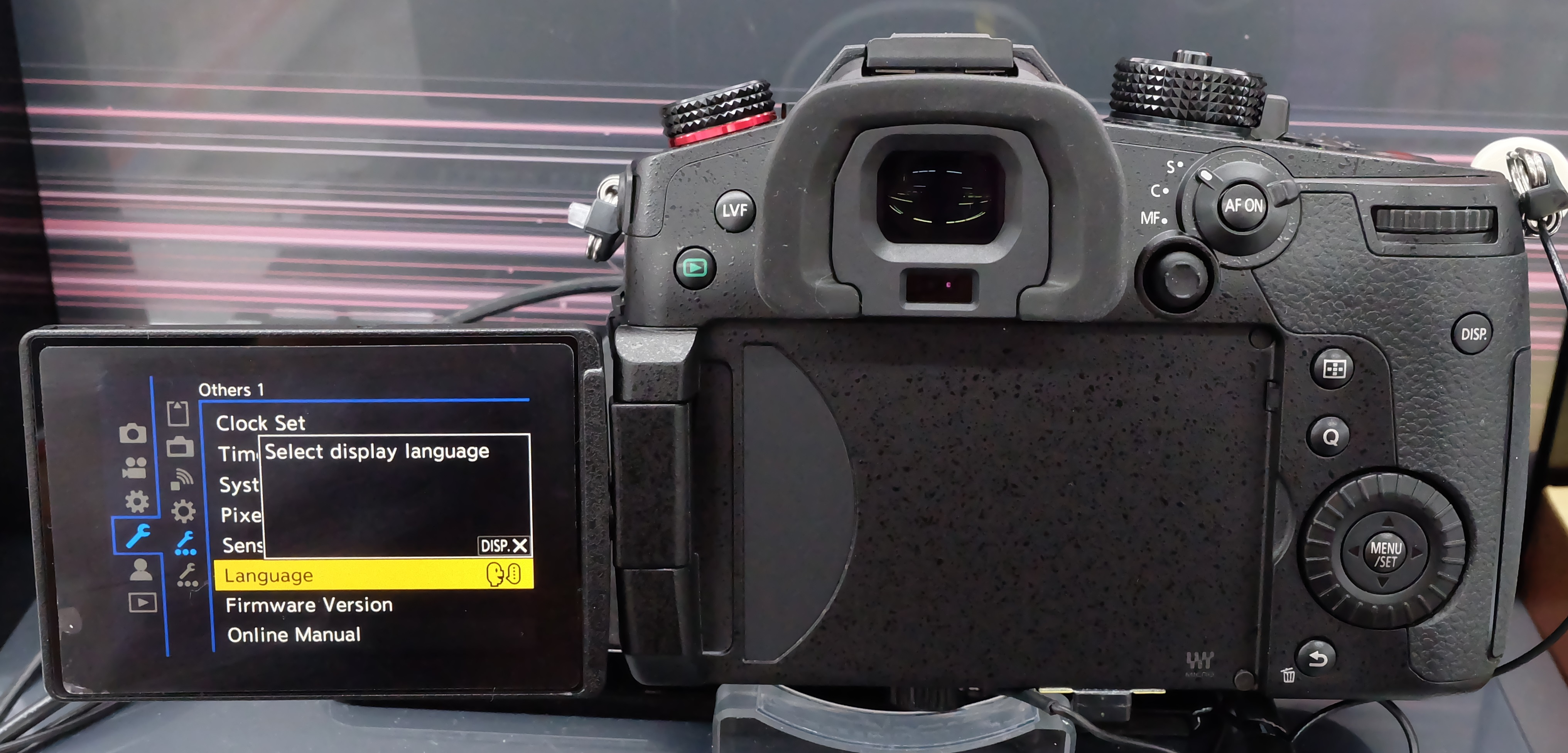

Brand	Form	Class	2008	2009	2010	2011			2012	2013	2014	2015	2016	2017	2018	2019	2020	2021	2022	2023	2024	25
Olympus	SLR style OM-D	Professional															E-M1X ^{R}					
Olympus	SLR style OM-D	High-end									E-M1			E-M1 II ^{R}			E-M1 III ^{R}					
Olympus	SLR style OM-D	Advanced							E-M5			E-M5 II ^{R}					E-M5 III ^{R}					
Olympus	SLR style OM-D	Mid-range									E-M10		E-M10 II		E-M10 III			E-M10 IV				
Olympus	Rangefinder style PEN	Mid-range		E-P1	E-P2		E-P3				E-P5		PEN-F ^{R}									
Olympus	Rangefinder style PEN	Upper-entry			E-PL1	E-PL2		E-PL3	E-PL5		E-PL6	E-PL7		E-PL8	E-PL9		E-PL10					
Olympus	Rangefinder style PEN	Entry-level					E-PM1		E-PM2													
Olympus	remote													Air								
OM System	SLR style	Professional																	OM-1 ^{R}		OM-1 II ^{R}	
OM System	SLR style	High-end																				OM-3 ^{R}
OM System	SLR style	Advanced																		OM-5 ^{R}		
OM System	PEN	Mid-range																	E-P7			
Panasonic	SLR style	High-end Video													GH5S				GH6 ^{R}			GH7 ^{R}
Panasonic	SLR style	High-end Photo													G9 ^{R}						G9 II ^{R}	
Panasonic	SLR style	High-end		GH1		GH2			GH3		GH4				GH5				GH5II			
Panasonic	SLR style	Mid-range		G1	G2		G3		G5		G6		G7	G80/G85			G90/G95					
Panasonic	SLR style	Entry-level			G10													G100			G100D	
Panasonic	Rangefinder style	Advanced							GX1		GX7		GX8		GX9							
Panasonic	Rangefinder style	Mid-range									GM1	GM5	GX80/GX85									
Panasonic	Rangefinder style	Entry-level			GF1	GF2	GF3		GF5		GF6	GF7	GF8	GX800/GX850/GF9		GX880/GF10/GF90						
Panasonic	Camcorder	Professional							AG-AF104													
Kodak	Rangefinder style	Entry-level										S-1										
DJI	Drone	.												Zenmuse X5S								
DJI	Drone	.												Zenmuse X5								
YI	Rangefinder style	Entry-level												M1								
Yongnuo	Rangefinder style	Android camera															YN450M		YN455			
Blackmagic Design	Rangefinder style	High-End Video							Cinema Camera													
Blackmagic Design	Rangefinder style	High-End Video									Pocket Cinema Camera					Pocket Cinema Camera 4K						
Blackmagic Design		High-End Video										Micro Cinema Camera									Micro Studio Camera 4K G2	
Z CAM	Cinema	Advanced											E1			E2						
Z CAM	Cinema	Mid-Range																E2-M4				
Z CAM	Cinema	Entry-Level															E2C					
JVC	Camcorder	Professional										GY-LS300										
SVS-Vistek		Industrial							EVO Tracer													
