= Panasonic Lumix DC-GH5 =

Digital camera model

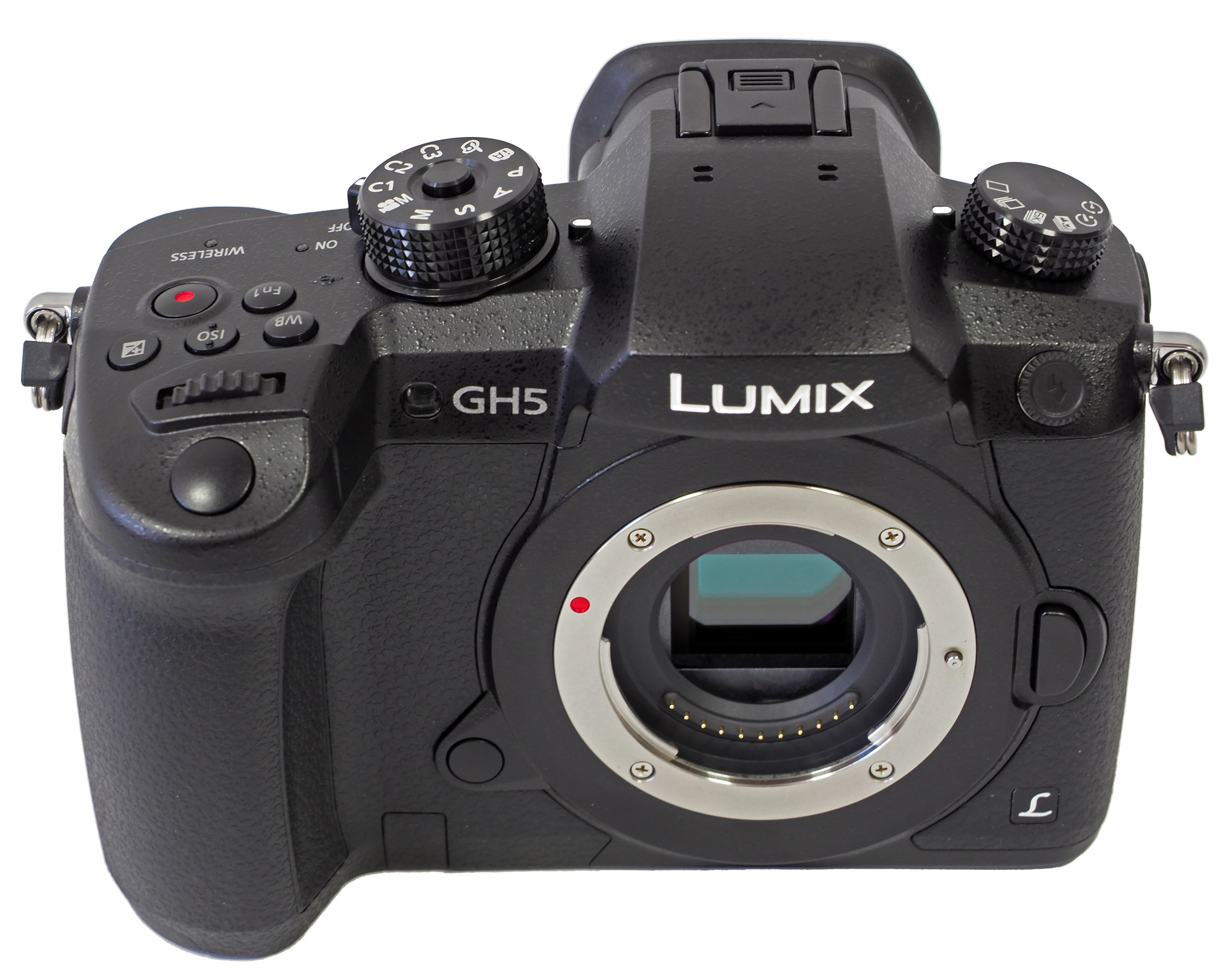

Overview
- Maker: Panasonic Holdings Corporation
- Type: Micro Four Thirds system mirrorless camera
- Released: March 2017

Lens
- Lens mount: Micro Four Thirds system mount

Sensor/medium
- Sensor: 4/3-type
- Sensor type: CMOS
- Sensor size: 17.3 x 13 mm (4:3 aspect ratio)
- Sensor maker: Sony
- Maximum resolution: 5184 x 3888 px (20.1 megapixels)
- Film speed: ISO 200-25600, extendable to 100
- Recording medium: 2x SD / SDHC / SDXC

Focusing
- Focus: Switchable Auto and Manual
- Focus modes: AF-C (Continuous-Servo), AF-F (Flexible AF), AF-S (Single Servo AF), Manual Focus
- Focus areas: 255 Contrast Detection AF

Exposure/metering
- Exposure modes: Program AE; Aperture Priority, Shutter priority, Manual
- Metering modes: Center-weighted, Multiple, Spot

Flash
- Flash synchronization: 1/250
- Flash bracketing: ±3 EV in ⅓ EV steps

Shutter
- Shutter: Focal-plane shutter / Electronic shutter
- Shutter speed range: 1/16000s - 60s, BULB
- Continuous shooting: 12 fps at 20.3 MP; 30 fps at 18MP; 60 fps at 8 MP

Viewfinder
- Viewfinder: OLED viewfinder; 3.6M dots
- Viewfinder magnification: 0.76x

Image processing
- White balance: Auto, Cloudy, Shade, Incadescent, Flash, Daylight, White Set 1/2/3/4, Custom WB based on color temperature

General
- Video recording: AVCHD / MP4 / MOV; 4096 x 2160 (24p, 25p); 3840 x 2160 (24p, 25p, 30p, 50p, 60p); 3328 x 2496p (24p, 25p, 30p 50p, 60p); 1920 x 1080p (24p, 25p, 30p, 50p, 60p)
- LCD screen: 3.2", 1.6M Dots, free-angle
- Battery: 7.2v 1860 mAh Lithium-ion battery pack
- Data port(s): Wi-Fi, Bluetooth, full-sized HDMI Type-A, USB 3.1 Gen1 5Gbit/s,
- Dimensions: 138.5×98.1×87.4 mm (5.45×3.86×3.44 in) (5.5 * 3.9 * 3.4")
- Weight: 725 g (26 oz) (1.595 lb) (battery and SD cards inserted)
- Made in: China

Chronology
- Predecessor: Lumix GH4
- Successor: Lumix GH5 II

The Panasonic Lumix DC-GH5 is a Micro Four Thirds mirrorless interchangeable lens camera body announced by Panasonic on 4 January 2017.

It is the first mirrorless camera capable of shooting 4K resolution video with 10-bit color with 4:2:2 chroma subsampling, along with recording in 4K 60p or 50p (but only in 8 bit). It also captures both 4K and Full HD without time limits. On September 28, 2017, Panasonic released firmware update 2.0 which added support for hybrid log–gamma (HLG) recording, along with a higher 400 Mbit/s bit rate All-i recording mode. The camera features 5-axis in-body stabilization, and, according to Panasonic, is freeze-proof, dust-proof, and splash-proof.

The later-released sister model Panasonic Lumix DC-GH5S is a more specialized filmmakers' camera that adds greater low-light sensitivity, a multi-aspect image sensor, and expanded DCI 4K options. It has a 10-megapixel non-stabilised image sensor. The Panasonic GH5S is an even more video-centric variant of the GH5: it can shoot either DCI or UHD 4K footage natively (i.e. where one capture pixel = one output pixel) at up to 60p. As well as the ability to shoot DCI 4K at higher frame rates, Panasonic claim the GH5S's larger pixels and 'Dual Native ISO' sensor will shoot significantly better footage in low light.

== Second generation ==
A second iteration of the camera – the GH5 II – was announced in May 2021, featuring the same sensor, but with a new processor.

== Gallery ==
Panasonic Lumix DC-GH5

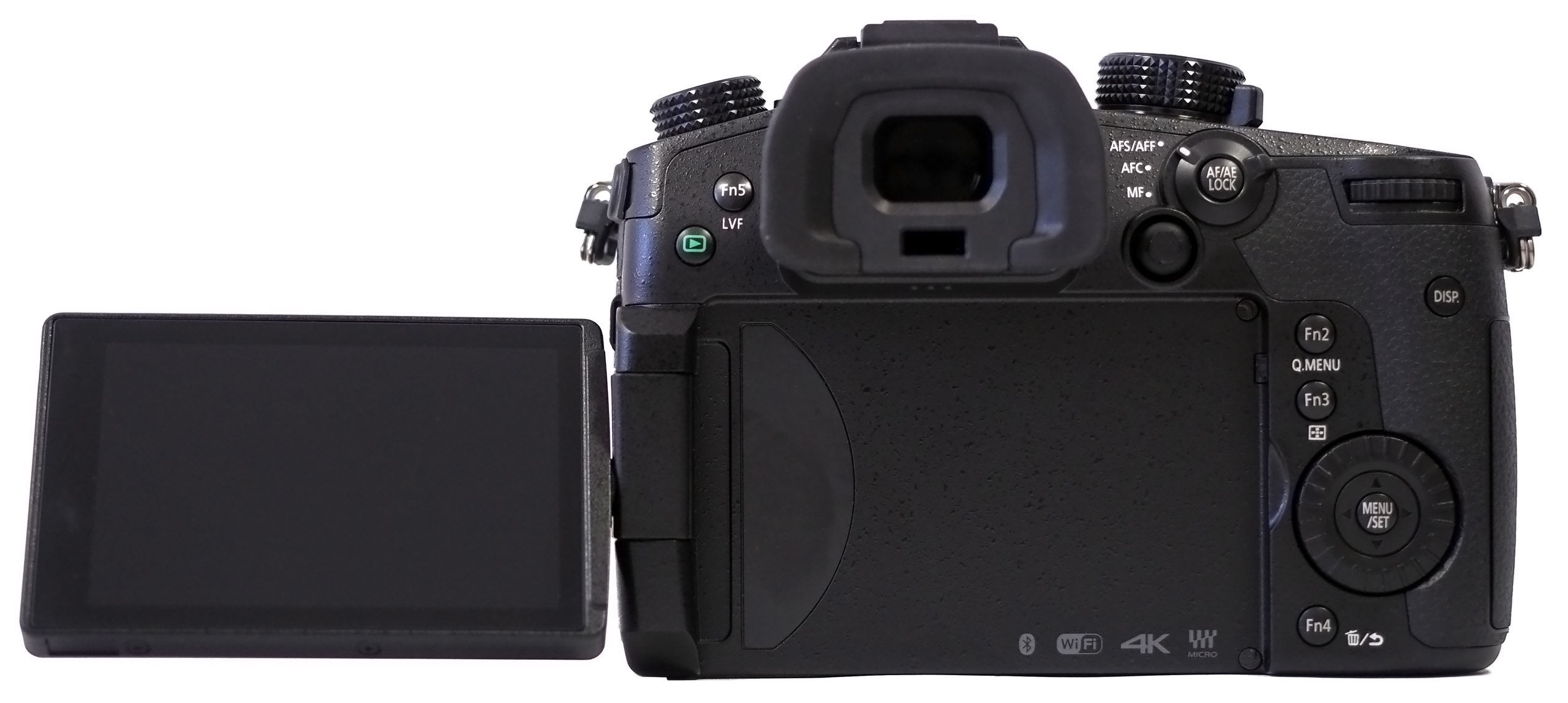
Back view with out-swivelled monitor

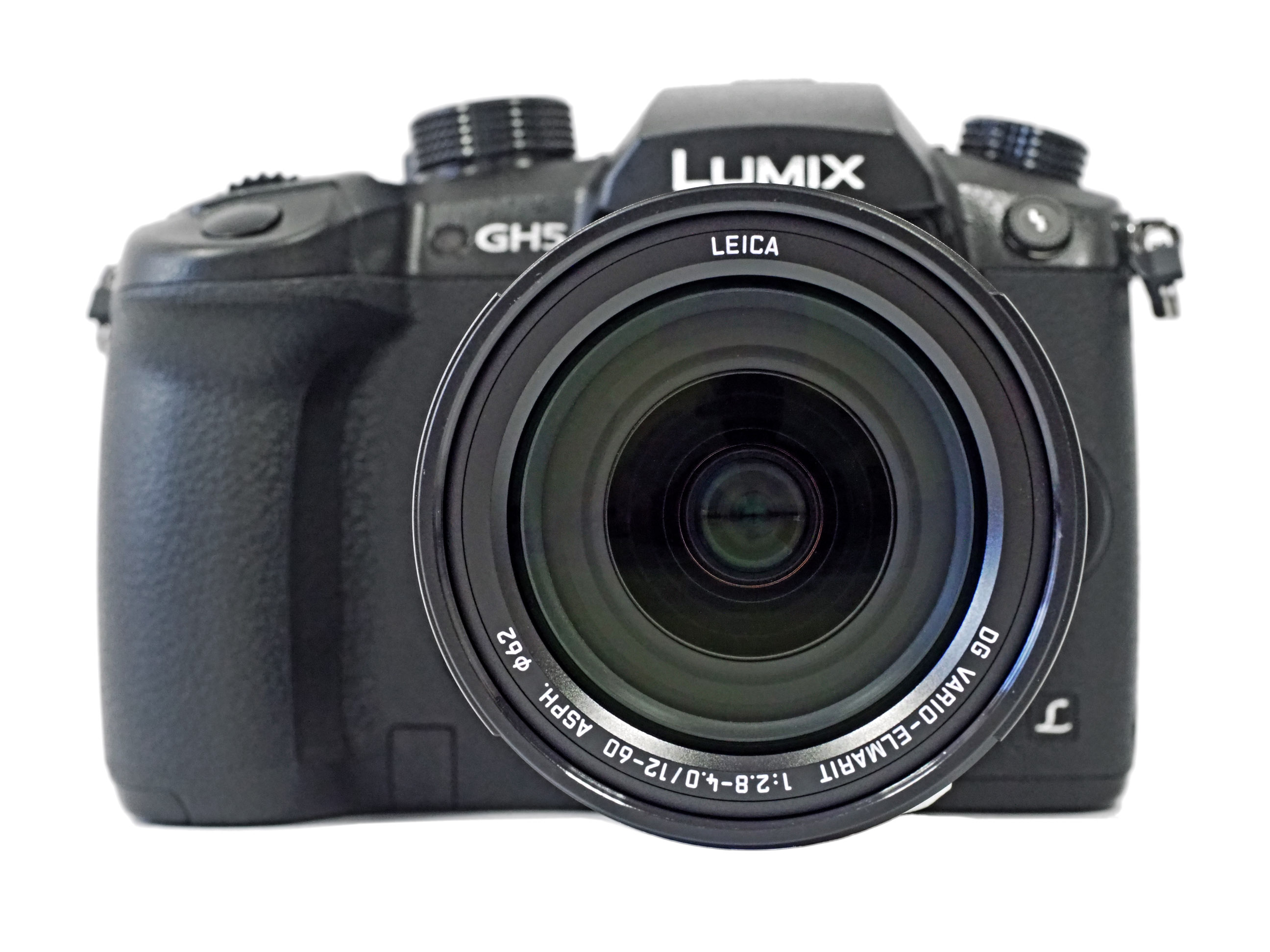
Front view with zoom lens Leica DG Vario-Elmarit 12–60 mm f/2.8–4.0

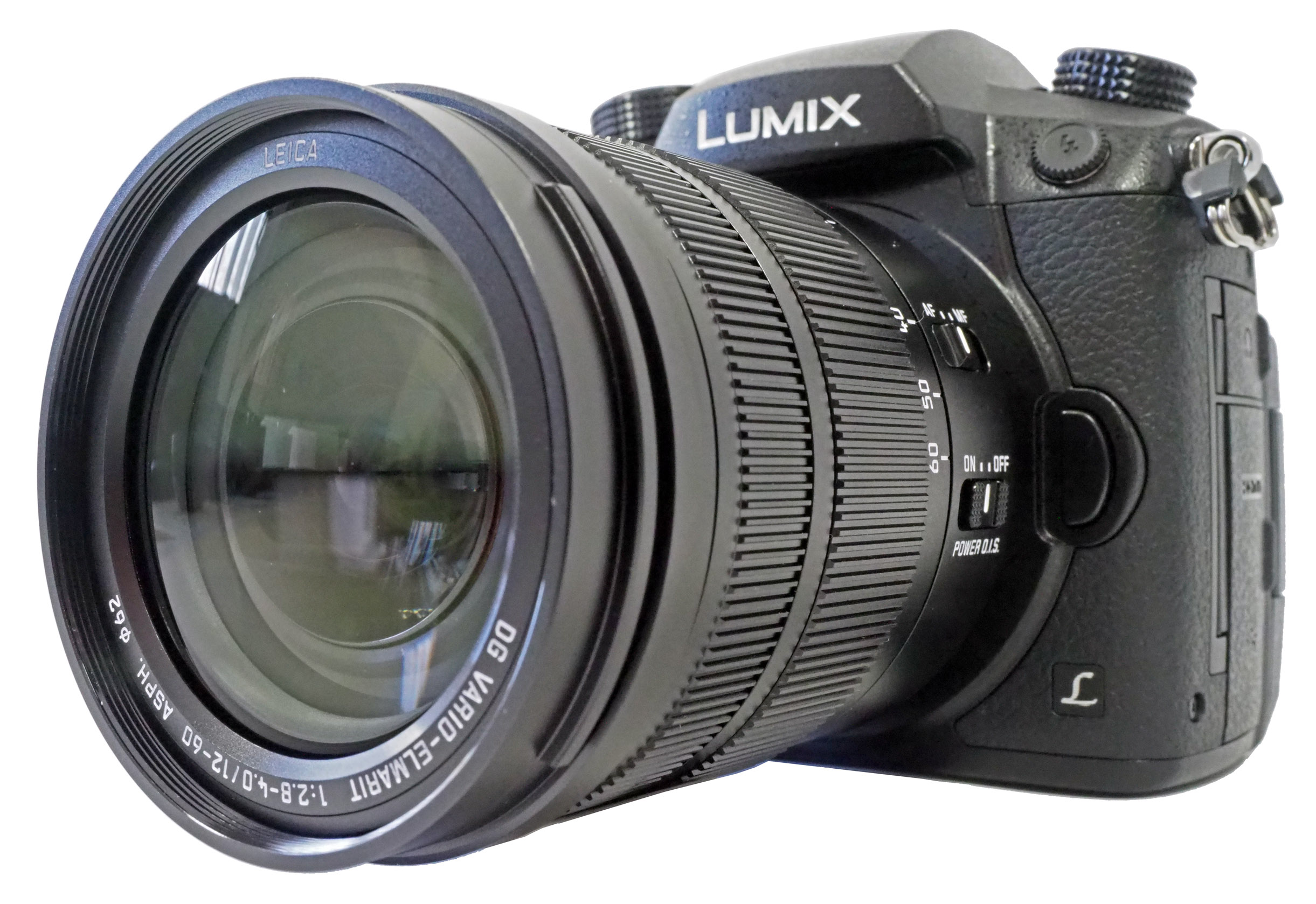
Perspective view with zoom lens Leica DG Vario-Elmarit 12–60 mm f/2.8–4.0

Brand	Form	Class	2008	2009	2010	2011			2012	2013	2014	2015	2016	2017	2018	2019	2020	2021	2022	2023	2024	25
Olympus	SLR style OM-D	Professional															E-M1X ^{R}					
Olympus	SLR style OM-D	High-end									E-M1			E-M1 II ^{R}			E-M1 III ^{R}					
Olympus	SLR style OM-D	Advanced							E-M5			E-M5 II ^{R}					E-M5 III ^{R}					
Olympus	SLR style OM-D	Mid-range									E-M10		E-M10 II		E-M10 III			E-M10 IV				
Olympus	Rangefinder style PEN	Mid-range		E-P1	E-P2		E-P3				E-P5		PEN-F ^{R}									
Olympus	Rangefinder style PEN	Upper-entry			E-PL1	E-PL2		E-PL3	E-PL5		E-PL6	E-PL7		E-PL8	E-PL9		E-PL10					
Olympus	Rangefinder style PEN	Entry-level					E-PM1		E-PM2													
Olympus	remote													Air								
OM System	SLR style	Professional																	OM-1 ^{R}		OM-1 II ^{R}	
OM System	SLR style	High-end																				OM-3 ^{R}
OM System	SLR style	Advanced																		OM-5 ^{R}		
OM System	PEN	Mid-range																	E-P7			
Panasonic	SLR style	High-end Video													GH5S				GH6 ^{R}			GH7 ^{R}
Panasonic	SLR style	High-end Photo													G9 ^{R}						G9 II ^{R}	
Panasonic	SLR style	High-end		GH1		GH2			GH3		GH4				GH5				GH5II			
Panasonic	SLR style	Mid-range		G1	G2		G3		G5		G6		G7	G80/G85			G90/G95					
Panasonic	SLR style	Entry-level			G10													G100			G100D	
Panasonic	Rangefinder style	Advanced							GX1		GX7		GX8		GX9							
Panasonic	Rangefinder style	Mid-range									GM1	GM5	GX80/GX85									
Panasonic	Rangefinder style	Entry-level			GF1	GF2	GF3		GF5		GF6	GF7	GF8	GX800/GX850/GF9		GX880/GF10/GF90						
Panasonic	Camcorder	Professional							AG-AF104													
Kodak	Rangefinder style	Entry-level										S-1										
DJI	Drone	.												Zenmuse X5S								
DJI	Drone	.												Zenmuse X5								
YI	Rangefinder style	Entry-level												M1								
Yongnuo	Rangefinder style	Android camera															YN450M		YN455			
Blackmagic Design	Rangefinder style	High-End Video							Cinema Camera													
Blackmagic Design	Rangefinder style	High-End Video									Pocket Cinema Camera					Pocket Cinema Camera 4K						
Blackmagic Design		High-End Video										Micro Cinema Camera									Micro Studio Camera 4K G2	
Z CAM	Cinema	Advanced											E1			E2						
Z CAM	Cinema	Mid-Range																E2-M4				
Z CAM	Cinema	Entry-Level															E2C					
JVC	Camcorder	Professional										GY-LS300										
SVS-Vistek		Industrial							EVO Tracer													
