= Olympus PEN E-PL3 =

Olympus Pen E-PL3
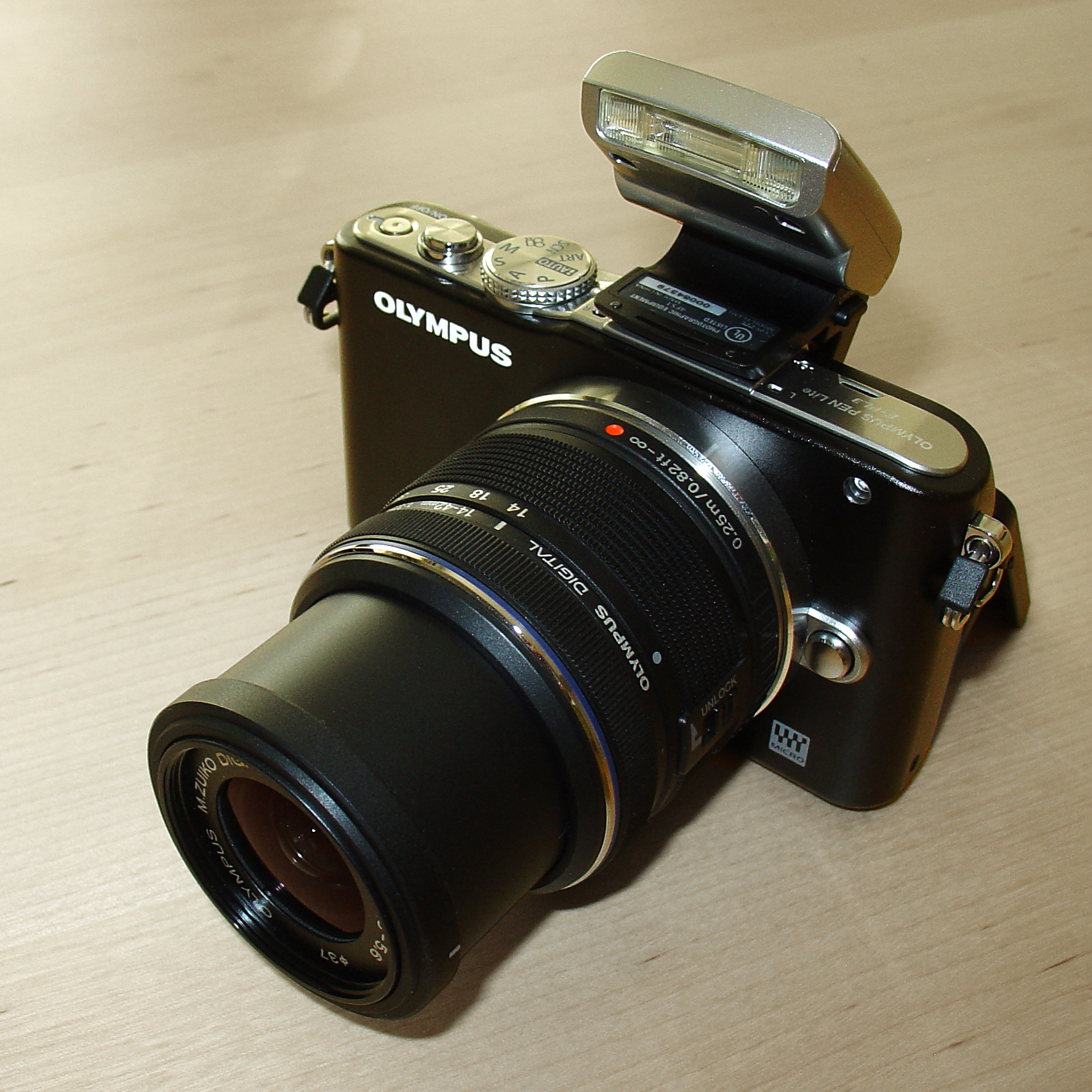
- A black Olympus PEN E-PL3 with the standard flash attachment and 14-42mm lens fitted

Overview
- Maker: Olympus Corporation
- Type: Micro Four Thirds, interchangeable lens camera

Lens
- Lens mount: Micro Four Thirds system
- Lens: Micro Four Thirds System mount

Sensor/medium
- Sensor: Four Thirds System 17.30 × 13.00 mm Live MOS
- Maximum resolution: 4032×3024 (12.19 megapixels)
- Film speed: ISO 200–12800
- Storage media: Secure Digital card; SDHC; SDXC

Focusing
- Focus modes: Single, continuous, manual
- Focus areas: 35 area contrast detect auto-focus, selectable

Exposure/metering
- Exposure modes: Program, shutter-priority, aperture-priority, manual
- Exposure metering: Digital ESP metering, Centre weighted average metering, Spot metering
- Metering modes: TTL ESP multi patterned (324-area multi pattern metering), Center-weighted average, Spot (1%)

Flash
- Flash: No built-in flash, but has Clip-on flash included, TTL, GN 10m equivalent (ISO200 · m); hotshoe for external flash attachment

Shutter
- Shutter: 1/4,000 to 60 s, up to 30 minutes bulb
- Continuous shooting: 4.1 frames/s (5.5 frames/s in case of "I.S. OFF"

Viewfinder
- Viewfinder: live preview, optional electronic viewfinder VF-2; optional electronic viewfinder VF-3; optional optical viewfinder VF-1

General
- LCD screen: 3" 460,000 pixel TFT LCD on screen with live preview
- Battery: Olympus BLS-5 Lithium-ion battery
- Dimensions: 109.5×63.7×37.3 mm (4.31×2.51×1.47 in) (4.31" * 2.51" * 1.47")
- Weight: 265 g (9.3 oz) (body only) 313 g (11.0 oz) (body, battery and SD memory card)

The Olympus PEN E-PL3 announced on 30 June 2011 is Olympus Corporation's seventh camera that adheres to the Micro Four Thirds (MFT) system design standard. The E-PL3 succeeds the Olympus PEN E-PL2, and was announced in concert with two other models, the Olympus PEN E-P3 (the flagship version), and the Olympus PEN E-PM1 (a new "Mini" version of the PEN camera line with similar features to the E-PL3). The E-PL3 is commonly said to be the "Lite" (less full featured) version of the E-P3, much as the E-PL1 and E-PL2 were "Lite" versions of the E-P1 and E-P2, respectively.

== Technology ==
The E-PL3 addresses some of the concerns that critics had about previous PEN models: slow handling, due to slow autofocus speed and difficulty seeing the LCD panel under certain (e.g., bright, sunny) conditions.

The E-PL3 increases autofocus speed through use of a 120 Hz refresh rate for its sensor, similar to the technology used in the recently released Panasonic Lumix DMC-GH2 and G3 cameras. Olympus claims, based on in-house testing, that the E-PL3, along with its E-PM1 cousin, have similar characteristics to the flagship E-P3, which according to Olympus has the world's fastest autofocus speed of any camera as of the product announcement date. The benefits of the 120 Hz refresh rate also provides the ability for continuous autofocus tracking during bursts of exposures, a faster shutter response (less lag) and less blackout time between exposures.

The E-PL3 lacks the E-P3 capacitive touchscreen for creative camera control, and the E-P3 OLED type display that is supposed to vastly improve performance in sunny conditions, and off-angle viewing. Instead, the E-PL3 has a tiltable LCD, which allows easy above the head, waist level, or low off the ground viewing. The E-PL3 continues with the proprietary Accessory Port, a power and communication port, which allows the use of various accessories, such as an external stereo microphone for HD video recording, LED macro lights, and a bluetooth communications adapter. The accessory port continues to be compatible with the high resolution, optional hotshoe mounted VF-2 electronic viewfinder (EVF).

The VF-2 had a flip angle eyepiece, allowing viewing from 0–90 degrees. The VF-2 had been criticized for being very expensive and for not having a locking device, with some users reporting easy dislodgement of the VF-2 from the hotshoe. To address these criticisms, in July 2011, Olympus announced the introduction of an optional VF-3 EVF, which has a lower resolution and a locking device.

== Differences over Olympus PEN E-P1 ==
- Addition of an Accessory Port that can be used for an electronic viewfinder, external microphone or external flash
- Two new Art filters-simulating Diorama and Cross process in camera
- Black finish widely available
- Auto focus tracking
- Colour boosting function named i-Enhance

== Specifications not in the infobox ==
- 1080 Full HD video at 60i frames per second in AVCHD format with Fine and Normal modes (frame/s)

== See also ==
- Olympus PEN E-PL1

== Micro Four Thirds Camera introduction roadmap ==
Item	Model	Sensor	Electronic View Finder (EVF)	Announced
1	Panasonic Lumix DMC-G1	4:3 / 13.1 mp (12.1 mp effective)	EVF; 1.4x magnification; 1.44M dots	2008, October
2	Panasonic Lumix DMC-GH1	4:3; 3:2; 16:9 (multi-aspect); 14.0 mp (12.1 mp effect)	EVF; 1.4x mag; 1.44M dots	2009, April
3	Olympus PEN E-P1	4:3 / 13.1 mp (12.3 mp effect)	optional hotshoe optical VF-1; 65-degree AOV	2009, July
4	Panasonic Lumix DMC-GF1	4:3 / 13.1 mp (12.1 mp effect)	opt hotshoe EVF LVF1; 1.04x mag; 202K dots	2009, September
5	Olympus PEN E-P2	4:3 / 13.1 mp (12.3 mp effect)	opt hotshoe EVF VF-2; 1.15x mag; 1.44M dots	2009, November
6	Olympus PEN E-PL1	4:3 / 13.1 mp (12.3 mp effect)	opt hotshoe EVF VF-2; 1.15x mag; 1.44M dots	2010, February
7	Panasonic Lumix DMC-G10	4:3 / 13.1 mp (12.1 mp effect)	EVF; 1.04x magnification; 202K dots	2010, March
8	Panasonic Lumix DMC-G2	4:3 / 13.1 mp (12.1 mp effect)	EVF; 1.4x mag; 1.44M dots	2010, March
9	Panasonic Lumix DMC-GH2	4:3; 3:2; 16:9 (multi-aspect); 18.3 mp (16.0 mp effect)	EVF; 1.42x mag; 1.53M dots	2010, September
10	Panasonic Lumix DMC-GF2	4:3 / 13.1 mp (12.1 mp effect)	opt hotshoe EVF; 1.04x mag; 202K dots	2010, November
11	Olympus PEN E-PL1s	4:3 / 13.1 mp (12.3 mp effect)	opt hotshoe EVF VF-2; 1.15x mag; 1.44M dots	2010, November
12	Olympus PEN E-PL2	4:3 / 13.1 mp (12.3 mp effect)	opt hotshoe EVF VF-2; 1.15x mag; 1.44M dots	2011, January
13	Panasonic Lumix DMC-G3	4:3 / 16.6 mp (15.8 mp effect)	EVF; 1.4x mag; 1.44M dots	2011, May
14	Panasonic Lumix DMC-GF3	4:3 / 13.1 mp (12.1 mp effect)	N/A	2011, June
15	Olympus PEN E-P3	4:3 / 13.1 mp (12.3 mp effect)	opt hotshoe EVF VF-2; 1.15x mag; 1.44M dots	2011, June
16	Olympus PEN E-PL3	4:3 / 13.1 mp (12.19 mp effect)	opt hotshoe EVF VF-2; 1.15x mag; 1.44M dots	2011, June
17	Olympus PEN E-PM1	4:3 / 13.1 mp (12.3 mp effect)	opt hotshoe EVF VF-2; 1.15x mag; 1.44M dots	2011, June
18	Panasonic Lumix DMC-GX1	4:3 / 16.6 mp (16.0 mp effect)	opt hotshoe EVF LVF2; 1.4x mag; 1.44M dots	2011, November
19	Olympus OM-D E-M5	4:3 / 16.9 mp (16.1 mp effect)	EVF; 1.15x mag; 1.44M dots	2012, February

Preceded by Olympus PEN E-PL2	Olympus PEN E-PL3 Micro Four Thirds System Camera; Autumn 2011–present	Succeeded by Olympus PEN E-PL5

Brand	Form	Class	2008	2009	2010	2011			2012	2013	2014	2015	2016	2017	2018	2019	2020	2021	2022	2023	2024	2025	2026
Olympus	SLR style OM-D	Professional															E-M1X ^{R}						
Olympus	SLR style OM-D	High-end									E-M1			E-M1 II ^{R}			E-M1 III ^{R}						
Olympus	SLR style OM-D	Advanced							E-M5			E-M5 II ^{R}					E-M5 III ^{R}						
Olympus	SLR style OM-D	Mid-range									E-M10		E-M10 II		E-M10 III			E-M10 IV					
Olympus	Rangefinder style PEN	Mid-range		E-P1	E-P2		E-P3				E-P5		PEN-F ^{R}										
Olympus	Rangefinder style PEN	Upper-entry			E-PL1	E-PL2		E-PL3	E-PL5		E-PL6	E-PL7		E-PL8	E-PL9		E-PL10						
Olympus	Rangefinder style PEN	Entry-level					E-PM1		E-PM2														
Olympus	remote													Air									
OM System	SLR style	Professional																	OM-1 ^{R}		OM-1 II ^{R}		
OM System	SLR style	High-end																				OM-3 ^{R}	
OM System	SLR style	Advanced																		OM-5 ^{R}			OM-5 II ^{R}
OM System	PEN	Mid-range																	E-P7				
Panasonic	SLR style	High-end Video													GH5S				GH6 ^{R}			GH7 ^{R}	
Panasonic	SLR style	High-end Photo													G9 ^{R}						G9 II ^{R}		
Panasonic	SLR style	High-end		GH1		GH2			GH3		GH4				GH5				GH5II				
Panasonic	SLR style	Mid-range		G1	G2		G3		G5		G6		G7	G80/G85			G90/G95						
Panasonic	SLR style	Entry-level			G10													G100			G100D		
Panasonic	Rangefinder style	Advanced							GX1		GX7		GX8		GX9								
Panasonic	Rangefinder style	Mid-range									GM1	GM5	GX80/GX85										
Panasonic	Rangefinder style	Entry-level			GF1	GF2	GF3		GF5		GF6	GF7	GF8	GX800/GX850/GF9		GX880/GF10/GF90							
Panasonic	Camcorder	Professional							AG-AF104														
Kodak	Rangefinder style	Entry-level										S-1											
DJI	Drone	.												Zenmuse X5S									
DJI	Drone	.												Zenmuse X5									
YI	Rangefinder style	Entry-level												M1									
Yongnuo	Rangefinder style	Android camera															YN450M		YN455				
Blackmagic Design	Rangefinder style	High-End Video							Cinema Camera														
Blackmagic Design	Rangefinder style	High-End Video									Pocket Cinema Camera					Pocket Cinema Camera 4K							
Blackmagic Design		High-End Video										Micro Cinema Camera									Micro Studio Camera 4K G2		
Z CAM	Cinema	Advanced											E1			E2							
Z CAM	Cinema	Mid-Range																E2-M4					
Z CAM	Cinema	Entry-Level															E2C						
JVC	Camcorder	Professional										GY-LS300											
SVS-Vistek		Industrial							EVO Tracer														
