= Panasonic Lumix DMC-G10 =

Overview
- Maker: Panasonic Holdings Corporation
- Type: Micro Four Thirds System

Lens
- Lens: Micro Four Thirds System mount

Sensor/medium
- Sensor: 17.3 mm × 13 mm Live MOS
- Maximum resolution: 4000×3000 (12.0 megapixels)
- Film speed: ISO 100–6400
- Storage media: SD, SDHC

Focusing
- Focus modes: Automatic or Manual Face detection / AF Tracking / 23-area-focusing / 1-area-focusing

Exposure/metering
- Exposure modes: Manual, Program, Automatic, Shutter Priority, Aperture Priority

Flash
- Flash: Built-in pop up, TTL, GN 11 equivalent (ISO100 · m)
- Flash bracketing: ±3.0 EV in ⅓ EV steps

Shutter
- Shutter speed range: 60 – 1/4000 sec

Viewfinder
- Viewfinder: EVF color display, 100% field of view, 0.52x (35mm equiv), 1.04x magnification, with 202K dots; LCD or fixed 3.0 inch colour LCD 460K dot equivalent

Image processing
- White balance: custom modes

General
- Battery: Li-Ion 7.2 V, 1250 mAh
- Weight: body 385 g with 14–42mm lens 638 g

The Panasonic Lumix DMC-G10 is the sixth digital mirrorless interchangeable lens camera introduced that adheres to the Micro Four Thirds System (MFT) system design standard, and the fourth Panasonic model MFT camera. The G10 model was announced concurrently with its more capable sibling, the Panasonic Lumix DMC-G2, in March 2010.

== Features ==
The G10 was positioned as an entry-level, basic MFT camera, similar in form and function to other Panasonic MFT still cameras such as the more feature-laden Panasonic Lumix DMC-G1, GH1 and G2. The G10 retained important core features such as the MFT sensor, shutter systems, and the ability to change lenses. However, it omitted certain cost-driving features, notably the articulating LCD in favor of a fixed-panel LCD, and the high-resolution electronic viewfinder (EVF) in favor of a lower resolution EVF, with a less clear and smooth image than its sister cameras with built-in EVFs. The lower-cost EVF has been one of the main criticisms of what was otherwise considered a very capable still camera; there are situations under which low resolution EVF is not easily usable. The G10, though, has video capabilities, where the G1 did not.

The G10 featured Motion JPEG video capability only, with a mono microphone, as opposed to more capable AVCHD recording formats found in the other Panasonic G and GH series cameras, with the exception of the G1, which had no video capability.

The G10 is supplied with a standard Panasonic 14–42 mm ƒ/3.5–5.6 kit lens (28–84 mm equivalent) and can use all native Micro Four Thirds System lenses. Four Thirds System lenses can be used with an adapter, as can the lenses from nearly every major manual focus camera mount, such as Leica M, Leica R, Olympus OM, Nikon F, Canon FD, Minolta SR, M42 Screw Mount, Contax/Yashica Mount and others. Canon EF mount lenses can be used with an adapter, but native EF lenses are electronically controlled, and will therefore not have aperture control or autofocus. The Micro Four Thirds System specification supports lenses with optical image stabilization.

The camera was available in one color: black (suffix K).

Upon introduction the United States, MSRP was set at US$600.00 with the kit lens.

=== Successor model ===
As of mid-2011, the G10 camera had no immediately apparent successor model, with the Panasonic Lumix DMC-G3 seemingly covering the replacement space for both the G10 and the G2 cameras.

== Micro Four Thirds camera introduction roadmap ==
Item	Model	Sensor	Electronic View Finder (EVF)	Announced
1	Panasonic Lumix DMC-G1	4:3 / 13.1 mp (12.1 mp effective)	EVF; 1.4x magnification; 1.44M dots	2008, October
2	Panasonic Lumix DMC-GH1	4:3; 3:2; 16:9 (multi-aspect); 14.0 mp (12.1 mp effect)	EVF; 1.4x mag; 1.44M dots	2009, April
3	Olympus PEN E-P1	4:3 / 13.1 mp (12.3 mp effect)	optional hotshoe optical VF-1; 65 degree AOV	2009, July
4	Panasonic Lumix DMC-GF1	4:3 / 13.1 mp (12.1 mp effect)	opt hotshoe EVF LVF1; 1.04x mag; 202K dots	2009, September
5	Olympus PEN E-P2	4:3 / 13.1 mp (12.3 mp effect)	opt hotshoe EVF VF-2; 1.15x mag; 1.44M dots	2009, November
6	Olympus PEN E-PL1	4:3 / 13.1 mp (12.3 mp effect)	opt hotshoe EVF VF-2; 1.15x mag; 1.44M dots	2010, February
7	Panasonic Lumix DMC-G10	4:3 / 13.1 mp (12.1 mp effect)	EVF; 1.04x magnification; 202K dots	2010, March
8	Panasonic Lumix DMC-G2	4:3 / 13.1 mp (12.1 mp effect)	EVF; 1.4x mag; 1.44M dots	2010, March
9	Panasonic Lumix DMC-GH2	4:3; 3:2; 16:9 (multi-aspect); 18.3 mp (16.0 mp effect)	EVF; 1.42x mag; 1.53M dots	2010, September
10	Panasonic Lumix DMC-GF2	4:3 / 13.1 mp (12.1 mp effect)	opt hotshoe EVF; 1.04x mag; 202K dots	2010, November
11	Olympus PEN E-PL1s	4:3 / 13.1 mp (12.3 mp effect)	opt hotshoe EVF VF-2; 1.15x mag; 1.44M dots	2010, November
12	Olympus PEN E-PL2	4:3 / 13.1 mp (12.3 mp effect)	opt hotshoe EVF VF-2; 1.15x mag; 1.44M dots	2011, January
13	Panasonic Lumix DMC-G3	4:3 / 16.6 mp (15.8 mp effect)	EVF; 1.4x mag; 1.44M dots	2011, May
14	Panasonic Lumix DMC-GF3	4:3 / 13.1 mp (12.1 mp effect)	N/A	2011, June
15	Olympus PEN E-P3	4:3 / 13.1 mp (12.3 mp effect)	opt hotshoe EVF VF-2; 1.15x mag; 1.44M dots	2011, June
16	Olympus PEN E-PL3	4:3 / 13.1 mp (12.3 mp effect)	opt hotshoe EVF VF-2; 1.15x mag; 1.44M dots	2011, June
17	Olympus PEN E-PM1	4:3 / 13.1 mp (12.3 mp effect)	opt hotshoe EVF VF-2; 1.15x mag; 1.44M dots	2011, June
18	Panasonic Lumix DMC-GX1	4:3 / 16.6 mp (16.0 mp effect)	opt hotshoe EVF LVF2; 1.4x mag; 1.44M dots	2011, November
19	Olympus OM-D E-M5	4:3 / 16.9 mp (16.1 mp effect)	EVF; 1.15x mag; 1.44M dots	2012, February

Preceded by No direct predecessor; closest is Panasonic Lumix DMC-G1	Panasonic Micro Four Thirds System cameras November 2008–present	Succeeded by No direct successor; closest is Panasonic Lumix DMC-G3

Brand	Form	Class	2008	2009	2010	2011			2012	2013	2014	2015	2016	2017	2018	2019	2020	2021	2022	2023	2024	2025	2026
Olympus	SLR style OM-D	Professional															E-M1X ^{R}						
Olympus	SLR style OM-D	High-end									E-M1			E-M1 II ^{R}			E-M1 III ^{R}						
Olympus	SLR style OM-D	Advanced							E-M5			E-M5 II ^{R}					E-M5 III ^{R}						
Olympus	SLR style OM-D	Mid-range									E-M10		E-M10 II		E-M10 III			E-M10 IV					
Olympus	Rangefinder style PEN	Mid-range		E-P1	E-P2		E-P3				E-P5		PEN-F ^{R}										
Olympus	Rangefinder style PEN	Upper-entry			E-PL1	E-PL2		E-PL3	E-PL5		E-PL6	E-PL7		E-PL8	E-PL9		E-PL10						
Olympus	Rangefinder style PEN	Entry-level					E-PM1		E-PM2														
Olympus	remote													Air									
OM System	SLR style	Professional																	OM-1 ^{R}		OM-1 II ^{R}		
OM System	SLR style	High-end																				OM-3 ^{R}	
OM System	SLR style	Advanced																		OM-5 ^{R}			OM-5 II ^{R}
OM System	PEN	Mid-range																	E-P7				
Panasonic	SLR style	High-end Video													GH5S				GH6 ^{R}			GH7 ^{R}	
Panasonic	SLR style	High-end Photo													G9 ^{R}						G9 II ^{R}		
Panasonic	SLR style	High-end		GH1		GH2			GH3		GH4				GH5				GH5II				
Panasonic	SLR style	Mid-range		G1	G2		G3		G5		G6		G7	G80/G85			G90/G95						
Panasonic	SLR style	Entry-level			G10													G100			G100D		
Panasonic	Rangefinder style	Advanced							GX1		GX7		GX8		GX9								
Panasonic	Rangefinder style	Mid-range									GM1	GM5	GX80/GX85										
Panasonic	Rangefinder style	Entry-level			GF1	GF2	GF3		GF5		GF6	GF7	GF8	GX800/GX850/GF9		GX880/GF10/GF90							
Panasonic	Camcorder	Professional							AG-AF104														
Kodak	Rangefinder style	Entry-level										S-1											
DJI	Drone	.												Zenmuse X5S									
DJI	Drone	.												Zenmuse X5									
YI	Rangefinder style	Entry-level												M1									
Yongnuo	Rangefinder style	Android camera															YN450M		YN455				
Blackmagic Design	Rangefinder style	High-End Video							Cinema Camera														
Blackmagic Design	Rangefinder style	High-End Video									Pocket Cinema Camera					Pocket Cinema Camera 4K							
Blackmagic Design		High-End Video										Micro Cinema Camera									Micro Studio Camera 4K G2		
Z CAM	Cinema	Advanced											E1			E2							
Z CAM	Cinema	Mid-Range																E2-M4					
Z CAM	Cinema	Entry-Level															E2C						
JVC	Camcorder	Professional										GY-LS300											
SVS-Vistek		Industrial							EVO Tracer														
