= Olympus PEN E-PL2 =

Olympus Pen E-PL2
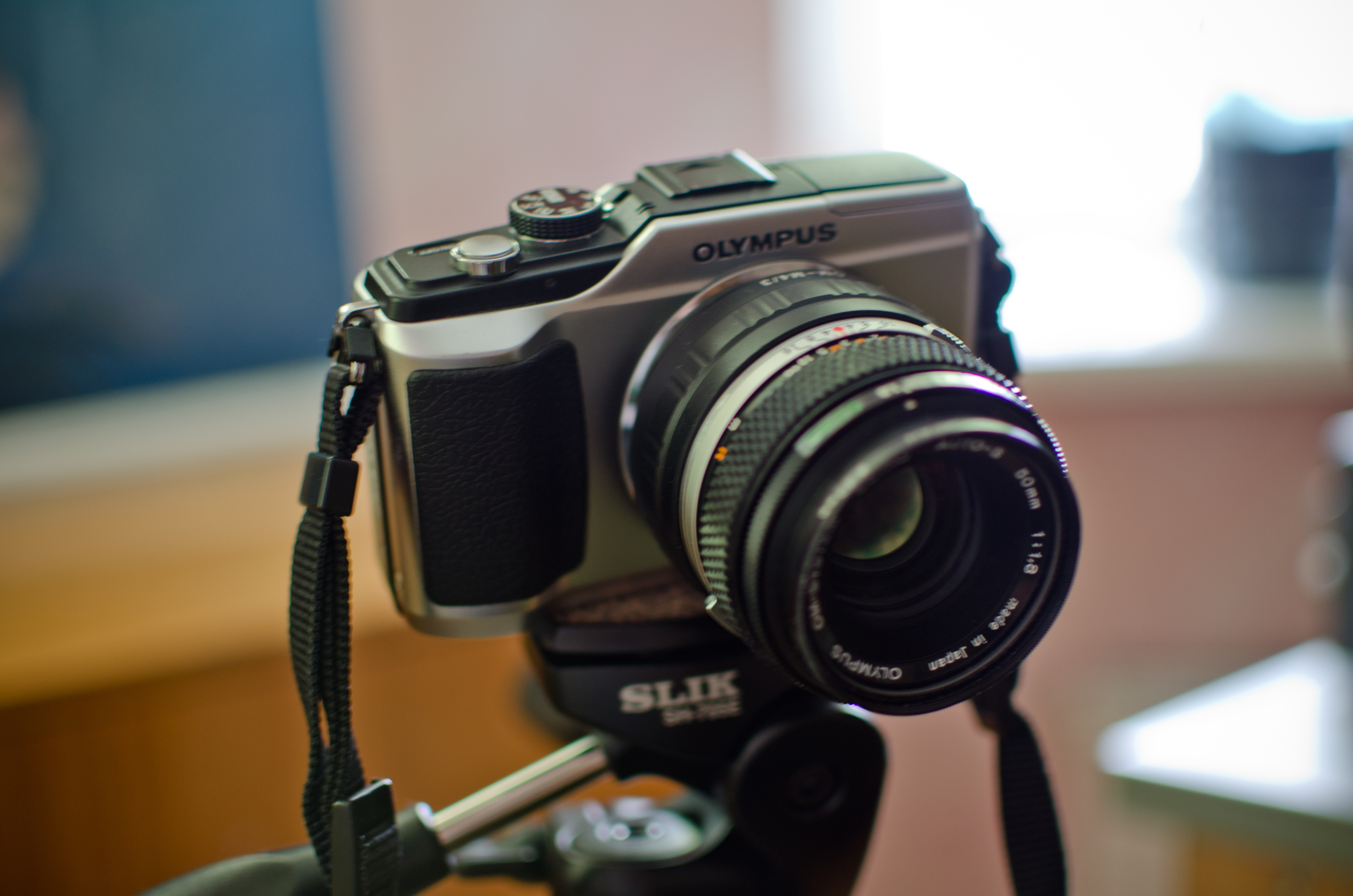
- Olympus PEN E-PL2 with a legacy lens OM Zuiko 50mm f/1.8

Overview
- Maker: Olympus Corporation
- Type: Micro Four Thirds, interchangeable lens camera

Lens
- Lens: Micro Four Thirds System mount

Sensor/medium
- Sensor: Four Thirds System 18.00 × 13.50 mm Live MOS
- Maximum resolution: 4032×3024 (12.3 megapixels)
- Storage media: Secure Digital card

Focusing
- Focus modes: Single, continuous, manual
- Focus areas: 11 area contrast detect auto-focus, selectable

Exposure/metering
- Exposure modes: Program, shutter-priority, aperture-priority, manual
- Metering modes: ESP multi patterned, Center-weighted average (60%), Spot (2%)

Flash
- Flash: Yes, also hot shoe allows for a variety of external flashes

Shutter
- Shutter: 1/4,000 to 60 s – 30 minutes bulb
- Continuous shooting: 3 frame/s Jpeg

Viewfinder
- Viewfinder: live preview, optional optical viewfinder (Olympus VF-1) and electronic viewfinder (Olympus VF-2)

General
- LCD screen: 3" 460,000 pixel TFT LCD on screen with live preview
- Battery: Li-ion 7,2V 1150mAh
- Dimensions: 120×70×35 mm (4.7×2.8×1.4 in)
- Weight: 335 g (12 oz) (0.739 lb) body only
- Made in: China

The Olympus PEN E-PL2, was announced in early January 2011 at the CES. This is Olympus Corporation's fourth camera that uses the Micro Four Thirds mount after the Olympus PEN E-P1, Olympus PEN E-P2 and Olympus PEN E-PL1. At the time it was announced, it had a US dollar MSRP of $599.99. As with earlier PEN models, the E-PL2 is aimed in between the point-and-shoot (compact camera) and D-SLR markets.

Noteworthy changes from the Olympus PEN E-PL1 model include:

- Arguably slightly improved in-body Image Stabilisation (IS) at 4EV equivalent.
- Bulb (long exposure) with cable-release option (RM-UC1 remote cable) up to 30m
- 3" LCD higher resolution 460,000 pixel screen
- 1/4000s shutter speed

== Micro Four Thirds Camera introduction roadmap ==
Item	Model	Sensor	Electronic View Finder (EVF)	Announced
1	Panasonic Lumix DMC-G1	4:3 / 13.1 mp (12.1 mp effective)	EVF; 1.4x magnification; 1.44M dots	2008, October
2	Panasonic Lumix DMC-GH1	4:3; 3:2; 16:9 (multi-aspect); 14.0 mp (12.1 mp effect)	EVF; 1.4x mag; 1.44M dots	2009, April
3	Olympus PEN E-P1	4:3 / 13.1 mp (12.3 mp effect)	optional hotshoe optical VF-1; 65 degree AOV	2009, July
4	Panasonic Lumix DMC-GF1	4:3 / 13.1 mp (12.1 mp effect)	opt hotshoe EVF LVF1; 1.04x mag; 202K dots	2009, September
5	Olympus PEN E-P2	4:3 / 13.1 mp (12.3 mp effect)	opt hotshoe EVF VF-2; 1.15x mag; 1.44M dots	2009, November
6	Olympus PEN E-PL1	4:3 / 13.1 mp (12.3 mp effect)	opt hotshoe EVF VF-2; 1.15x mag; 1.44M dots	2010, February
7	Panasonic Lumix DMC-G10	4:3 / 13.1 mp (12.1 mp effect)	EVF; 1.04x magnification; 202K dots	2010, March
8	Panasonic Lumix DMC-G2	4:3 / 13.1 mp (12.1 mp effect)	EVF; 1.4x mag; 1.44M dots	2010, March
9	Panasonic Lumix DMC-GH2	4:3; 3:2; 16:9 (multi-aspect); 18.3 mp (16.0 mp effect)	EVF; 1.42x mag; 1.53M dots	2010, September
10	Panasonic Lumix DMC-GF2	4:3 / 13.1 mp (12.1 mp effect)	opt hotshoe EVF; 1.04x mag; 202K dots	2010, November
11	Olympus PEN E-PL1s	4:3 / 13.1 mp (12.3 mp effect)	opt hotshoe EVF VF-2; 1.15x mag; 1.44M dots	2010, November
12	Olympus PEN E-PL2	4:3 / 13.1 mp (12.3 mp effect)	opt hotshoe EVF VF-2; 1.15x mag; 1.44M dots	2011, January
13	Panasonic Lumix DMC-G3	4:3 / 16.6 mp (15.8 mp effect)	EVF; 1.4x mag; 1.44M dots	2011, May
14	Panasonic Lumix DMC-GF3	4:3 / 13.1 mp (12.1 mp effect)	N/A	2011, June
15	Olympus PEN E-P3	4:3 / 13.1 mp (12.3 mp effect)	opt hotshoe EVF VF-2; 1.15x mag; 1.44M dots	2011, June
16	Olympus PEN E-PL3	4:3 / 13.1 mp (12.3 mp effect)	opt hotshoe EVF VF-2; 1.15x mag; 1.44M dots	2011, June
17	Olympus PEN E-PM1	4:3 / 13.1 mp (12.3 mp effect)	opt hotshoe EVF VF-2; 1.15x mag; 1.44M dots	2011, June
18	Panasonic Lumix DMC-GX1	4:3 / 16.6 mp (16.0 mp effect)	opt hotshoe EVF LVF2; 1.4x mag; 1.44M dots	2011, November
19	Olympus OM-D E-M5	4:3 / 16.9 mp (16.1 mp effect)	EVF; 1.15x mag; 1.44M dots	2012, February

Brand	Form	Class	2008	2009	2010	2011			2012	2013	2014	2015	2016	2017	2018	2019	2020	2021	2022	2023	2024	25
Olympus	SLR style OM-D	Professional															E-M1X ^{R}					
Olympus	SLR style OM-D	High-end									E-M1			E-M1 II ^{R}			E-M1 III ^{R}					
Olympus	SLR style OM-D	Advanced							E-M5			E-M5 II ^{R}					E-M5 III ^{R}					
Olympus	SLR style OM-D	Mid-range									E-M10		E-M10 II		E-M10 III			E-M10 IV				
Olympus	Rangefinder style PEN	Mid-range		E-P1	E-P2		E-P3				E-P5		PEN-F ^{R}									
Olympus	Rangefinder style PEN	Upper-entry			E-PL1	E-PL2		E-PL3	E-PL5		E-PL6	E-PL7		E-PL8	E-PL9		E-PL10					
Olympus	Rangefinder style PEN	Entry-level					E-PM1		E-PM2													
Olympus	remote													Air								
OM System	SLR style	Professional																	OM-1 ^{R}		OM-1 II ^{R}	
OM System	SLR style	High-end																				OM-3 ^{R}
OM System	SLR style	Advanced																		OM-5 ^{R}		
OM System	PEN	Mid-range																	E-P7			
Panasonic	SLR style	High-end Video													GH5S				GH6 ^{R}			GH7 ^{R}
Panasonic	SLR style	High-end Photo													G9 ^{R}						G9 II ^{R}	
Panasonic	SLR style	High-end		GH1		GH2			GH3		GH4				GH5				GH5II			
Panasonic	SLR style	Mid-range		G1	G2		G3		G5		G6		G7	G80/G85			G90/G95					
Panasonic	SLR style	Entry-level			G10													G100			G100D	
Panasonic	Rangefinder style	Advanced							GX1		GX7		GX8		GX9							
Panasonic	Rangefinder style	Mid-range									GM1	GM5	GX80/GX85									
Panasonic	Rangefinder style	Entry-level			GF1	GF2	GF3		GF5		GF6	GF7	GF8	GX800/GX850/GF9		GX880/GF10/GF90						
Panasonic	Camcorder	Professional							AG-AF104													
Kodak	Rangefinder style	Entry-level										S-1										
DJI	Drone	.												Zenmuse X5S								
DJI	Drone	.												Zenmuse X5								
YI	Rangefinder style	Entry-level												M1								
Yongnuo	Rangefinder style	Android camera															YN450M		YN455			
Blackmagic Design	Rangefinder style	High-End Video							Cinema Camera													
Blackmagic Design	Rangefinder style	High-End Video									Pocket Cinema Camera					Pocket Cinema Camera 4K						
Blackmagic Design		High-End Video										Micro Cinema Camera									Micro Studio Camera 4K G2	
Z CAM	Cinema	Advanced											E1			E2						
Z CAM	Cinema	Mid-Range																E2-M4				
Z CAM	Cinema	Entry-Level															E2C					
JVC	Camcorder	Professional										GY-LS300										
SVS-Vistek		Industrial							EVO Tracer													
