= Panasonic Lumix DMC-GF3 =

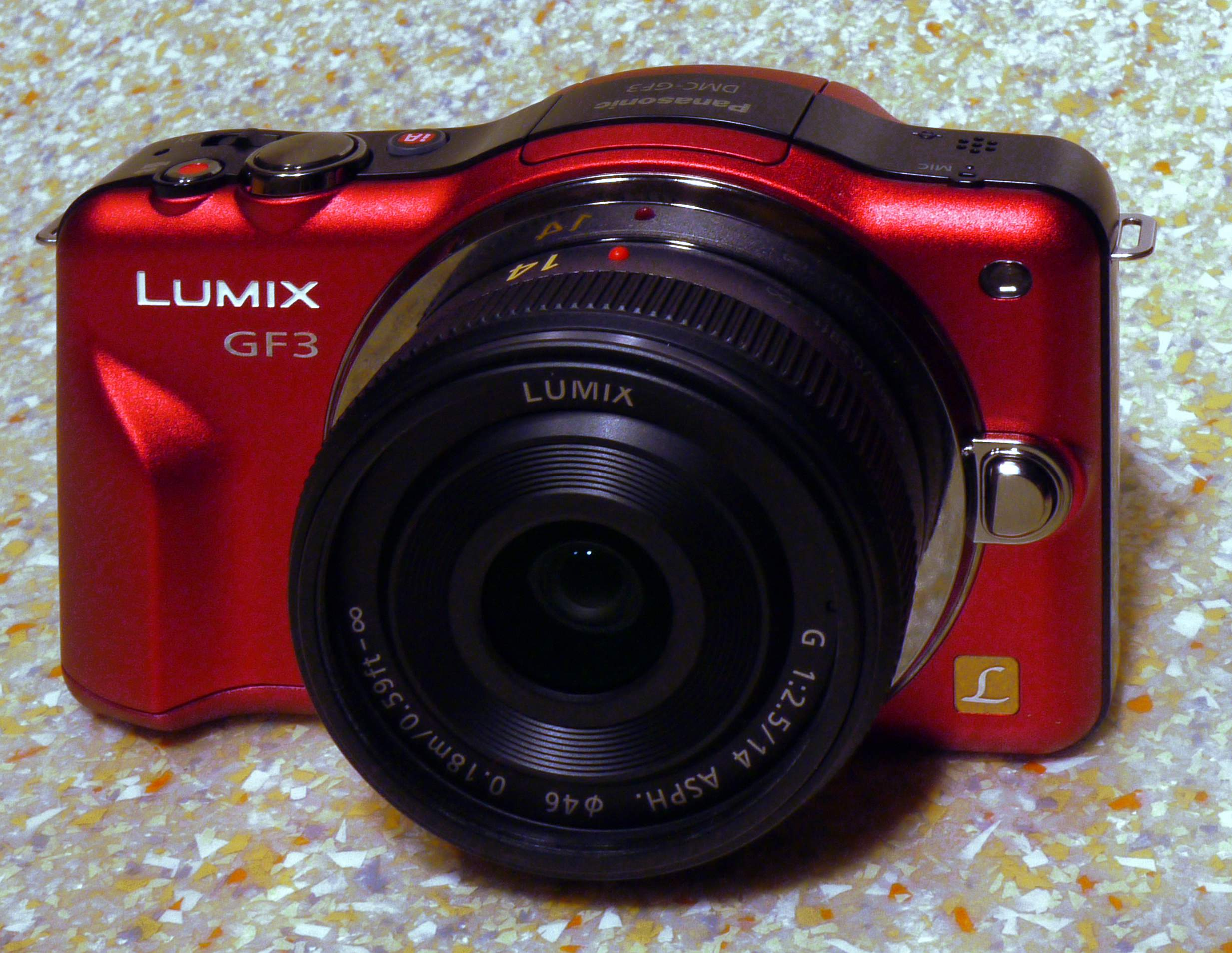
- Panasonic Lumix DMC-GF3 with body color red and the Lumix G 14mm F2.5 lens attached

Overview
- Maker: Panasonic Holdings Corporation
- Type: Micro Four Thirds System

Lens
- Lens: Micro Four Thirds System mount

Sensor/medium
- Sensor: 4/3 type MOS ('Live MOS sensor')
- Maximum resolution: 4000×3000 (12.0 megapixels)
- Film speed: ISO 160–6400
- Storage media: SD /SDHC /SDXC

Focusing
- Focus modes: Auto Focus, Manual focus, Face Detection, AF Tracking, 23-Area-Focusing/1 Area Focusing, Single or Continuous AF, Touch shutter, Quick AF, Continuous AF (during motion image recording), AF+MF, Touch MF Assist

Exposure/metering
- Exposure modes: Program AE, Aperture priority AE, Shutter priority AE, Manual, iAuto, SCN, Movie, Custom (2)
- Exposure metering: 144-zone multi-pattern sensing system
- Metering modes: Multiple-Weighted, Center-Weighted, Spot

Flash
- Flash: Built-in-Flash, TTL, GN 6.3 equivalent (ISO160 · m)

Shutter
- Shutter: focal-plane
- Shutter speed range: 60–1/4000 sec
- Continuous shooting: 7 RAW images, Unlimited JPEG images with a fast card; H: 3.8 frames/sec, M: 2.8 frames/sec (with Live View), L: 2 frames/sec (with Live View)

Viewfinder
- Viewfinder: None (no accessory hotshoe)

General
- LCD screen: 3.0" Low temperature Polycrystalline TFT LCD with Touch panel;wide angle view
- Battery: 940 mAh 7.2v Lithium-Ion rechargeable battery
- Dimensions: 107.7 by 67.1 by 32.5 millimetres (4.24 in × 2.64 in × 1.28 in)
- Weight: Approx. 264 g (9.3 oz) (camera body, battery, SD Card), Approx. 319 g (11.3 oz) (incl. 14 mm lens, card and battery)
- Made in: Japan

Panasonic Lumix DMC-GF3 is the eighth camera in Panasonic's Lumix G-series adhering to the Micro Four Thirds System (MFT) design standard, and was announced in June 2011.

The Panasonic DMC-GF3 uses a resistive touchscreen to provide mode selections, and as such that there is not a mode dial on the camera. Many features are no longer controlled by dials and buttons and wheels, but via the 3-inch touchscreen (460K dot) at the rear of the unit.

At the time of introduction on 13 June 2011, the GF3 was the world's smallest and lightest digital-interchangeable lens system camera.

The GF3 has received generally positive reviews for a small camera with a large sensor, and has speedy handling, including very fast auto focus, and good image quality. The camera was praised for its improvements in JPEG colour rendering and high ISO over the previous Panasonic GF2 model but criticised the GF3 for its lack of external controls and hotshoe (preventing use of the Panasonic viewfinder or flash system) and the older 12MP sensor which is showing its age against the newer Panasonic sensors and the larger APS-C sensors used in the Sony NEX cameras.

The GF3 began shipping in late July 2011 and was configured in several kits available with the Lumix G 14mm F2.5 lens (GF3C), the Lumix G 14-42mm F3.5-5.6 (GF3K), both the Lumix G 14mm F2.5 and 14-42mm F3.5-5.6 lenses (GF3W) or the Lumix G 14-42mm X PZ lens F3.5-5.6 (GF3X). The last letter of the product code identifies the GF3 body colour, available colours are Black (Code K), Pink (Code P), Red, (Code R), Brown (Code T) and White (Code W).

== Features ==
The GF3 is one of the world's smallest and lightest interchangeable lens system cameras. Designed in accordance with the Micro Four Thirds (MFT) system design standard, the GF3 is capable of both still and High Definition video, and is able to use a wide variety of MFT lenses supplied by both Olympus and Panasonic, as well as other third party lenses which conform to the MFT system design standard. With certain of the system pancake lenses, the GF3 is small enough to fit into a pocket, and yet is capable of delivering images that rival lower end digital single lens reflex (DSLR) cameras that are much bulkier in both size and weight.

The GF3 boasts an upgraded processor, so that it can focus much faster than predecessor GF1 and GF2 models, even though it uses the same 12MP four thirds sensor. The GF3 focus and reaction time is on par with its more expensive Panasonic Lumix DMC-G3 sibling, but the GF3 cannot match the image quality of the newer, higher resolution 16MP G3 sensor, especially under low light conditions where higher ISO (greater than 800) speeds are used. However, even though the GF3 uses the older 12MP sensor the in camera JPEG processing has been improved for better colors and better high ISO performance when compared to the GF 2 and GF1 camera bodies. The GF3 puts small size at a premium, and when paired with a pancake lens made by either Panasonic or Olympus will make a particularly attractive purse or pocketable large sensor, interchangeable lens camera. Examples of such pancake type lenses would be the Panasonic Lumix 14mm f/2.5, the Olympus 17 mm f/2.8 or the Panasonic 20mm f/1.7 pancake lenses. The newly introduced Panasonic 14-42mm f/3.5-5.6 X series power zoom lens is a very compact zoom lens which in storage mode is only slightly larger than the Panasonic 20mm pancake.

== Firmware updates ==
=== Panasonic Firmware releases ===
Panasonic has announced the following firmware update

Version	Release date	Notes
1.1 1.0	2011-October Original	Compatibility update for new Panasonic X class lenses with power zoom feature.: 1. Display of the focal length When you zoom, the focal distance is displayed and you can confirm the zoom position.; 2. Step zoom When you operate the zoom, the zoom will stop at positions corresponding to predetermined distances.; 3. Zoom resume When you switch the power switch [ON], the zoom positions when you last switched [OFF] are automatically restored.; 4. Selectable zoom speed Users can select the speed of electric-powered zooming.; Original

== See also ==
- Olympus PEN E-P2
- Olympus PEN E-PL2
- Olympus PEN E-P3
- Olympus PEN E-PL3
- Panasonic Lumix DMC-GF1

== Micro Four Thirds Camera introduction roadmap ==
Item	Model	Sensor	Electronic View Finder (EVF)	Announced
1	Panasonic Lumix DMC-G1	4:3 / 13.1 mp (12.1 mp effective)	EVF; 1.4x magnification; 1.44M dots	2008, October
2	Panasonic Lumix DMC-GH1	4:3; 3:2; 16:9 (multi-aspect); 14.0 mp (12.1 mp effect)	EVF; 1.4x mag; 1.44M dots	2009, April
3	Olympus PEN E-P1	4:3 / 13.1 mp (12.3 mp effect)	optional hotshoe optical VF-1; 65 degree AOV	2009, July
4	Panasonic Lumix DMC-GF1	4:3 / 13.1 mp (12.1 mp effect)	opt hotshoe EVF LVF1; 1.04x mag; 202K dots	2009, September
5	Olympus PEN E-P2	4:3 / 13.1 mp (12.3 mp effect)	opt hotshoe EVF VF-2; 1.15x mag; 1.44M dots	2009, November
6	Olympus PEN E-PL1	4:3 / 13.1 mp (12.3 mp effect)	opt hotshoe EVF VF-2; 1.15x mag; 1.44M dots	2010, February
7	Panasonic Lumix DMC-G10	4:3 / 13.1 mp (12.1 mp effect)	EVF; 1.04x magnification; 202K dots	2010, March
8	Panasonic Lumix DMC-G2	4:3 / 13.1 mp (12.1 mp effect)	EVF; 1.4x mag; 1.44M dots	2010, March
9	Panasonic Lumix DMC-GH2	4:3; 3:2; 16:9 (multi-aspect); 18.3 mp (16.0 mp effect)	EVF; 1.42x mag; 1.53M dots	2010, September
10	Panasonic Lumix DMC-GF2	4:3 / 13.1 mp (12.1 mp effect)	opt hotshoe EVF; 1.04x mag; 202K dots	2010, November
11	Olympus PEN E-PL1s	4:3 / 13.1 mp (12.3 mp effect)	opt hotshoe EVF VF-2; 1.15x mag; 1.44M dots	2010, November
12	Olympus PEN E-PL2	4:3 / 13.1 mp (12.3 mp effect)	opt hotshoe EVF VF-2; 1.15x mag; 1.44M dots	2011, January
13	Panasonic Lumix DMC-G3	4:3 / 16.6 mp (15.8 mp effect)	EVF; 1.4x mag; 1.44M dots	2011, May
14	Panasonic Lumix DMC-GF3	4:3 / 13.1 mp (12.1 mp effect)	N/A	2011, June
15	Olympus PEN E-P3	4:3 / 13.1 mp (12.3 mp effect)	opt hotshoe EVF VF-2; 1.15x mag; 1.44M dots	2011, June
16	Olympus PEN E-PL3	4:3 / 13.1 mp (12.3 mp effect)	opt hotshoe EVF VF-2; 1.15x mag; 1.44M dots	2011, June
17	Olympus PEN E-PM1	4:3 / 13.1 mp (12.3 mp effect)	opt hotshoe EVF VF-2; 1.15x mag; 1.44M dots	2011, June
18	Panasonic Lumix DMC-GX1	4:3 / 16.6 mp (16.0 mp effect)	opt hotshoe EVF LVF2; 1.4x mag; 1.44M dots	2011, November
19	Olympus OM-D E-M5	4:3 / 16.9 mp (16.1 mp effect)	EVF; 1.15x mag; 1.44M dots	2012, February

Preceded by Panasonic Lumix DMC-GF2	Panasonic Micro Four Thirds System cameras November 2008–present	Succeeded by Panasonic Lumix DMC-GF5

Brand	Form	Class	2008	2009	2010	2011			2012	2013	2014	2015	2016	2017	2018	2019	2020	2021	2022	2023	2024	2025	2026
Olympus	SLR style OM-D	Professional															E-M1X ^{R}						
Olympus	SLR style OM-D	High-end									E-M1			E-M1 II ^{R}			E-M1 III ^{R}						
Olympus	SLR style OM-D	Advanced							E-M5			E-M5 II ^{R}					E-M5 III ^{R}						
Olympus	SLR style OM-D	Mid-range									E-M10		E-M10 II		E-M10 III			E-M10 IV					
Olympus	Rangefinder style PEN	Mid-range		E-P1	E-P2		E-P3				E-P5		PEN-F ^{R}										
Olympus	Rangefinder style PEN	Upper-entry			E-PL1	E-PL2		E-PL3	E-PL5		E-PL6	E-PL7		E-PL8	E-PL9		E-PL10						
Olympus	Rangefinder style PEN	Entry-level					E-PM1		E-PM2														
Olympus	remote													Air									
OM System	SLR style	Professional																	OM-1 ^{R}		OM-1 II ^{R}		
OM System	SLR style	High-end																				OM-3 ^{R}	
OM System	SLR style	Advanced																		OM-5 ^{R}			OM-5 II ^{R}
OM System	PEN	Mid-range																	E-P7				
Panasonic	SLR style	High-end Video													GH5S				GH6 ^{R}			GH7 ^{R}	
Panasonic	SLR style	High-end Photo													G9 ^{R}						G9 II ^{R}		
Panasonic	SLR style	High-end		GH1		GH2			GH3		GH4				GH5				GH5II				
Panasonic	SLR style	Mid-range		G1	G2		G3		G5		G6		G7	G80/G85			G90/G95						
Panasonic	SLR style	Entry-level			G10													G100			G100D		
Panasonic	Rangefinder style	Advanced							GX1		GX7		GX8		GX9								
Panasonic	Rangefinder style	Mid-range									GM1	GM5	GX80/GX85										
Panasonic	Rangefinder style	Entry-level			GF1	GF2	GF3		GF5		GF6	GF7	GF8	GX800/GX850/GF9		GX880/GF10/GF90							
Panasonic	Camcorder	Professional							AG-AF104														
Kodak	Rangefinder style	Entry-level										S-1											
DJI	Drone	.												Zenmuse X5S									
DJI	Drone	.												Zenmuse X5									
YI	Rangefinder style	Entry-level												M1									
Yongnuo	Rangefinder style	Android camera															YN450M		YN455				
Blackmagic Design	Rangefinder style	High-End Video							Cinema Camera														
Blackmagic Design	Rangefinder style	High-End Video									Pocket Cinema Camera					Pocket Cinema Camera 4K							
Blackmagic Design		High-End Video										Micro Cinema Camera									Micro Studio Camera 4K G2		
Z CAM	Cinema	Advanced											E1			E2							
Z CAM	Cinema	Mid-Range																E2-M4					
Z CAM	Cinema	Entry-Level															E2C						
JVC	Camcorder	Professional										GY-LS300											
SVS-Vistek		Industrial							EVO Tracer														
