= Panasonic Lumix DMC-GF2 =

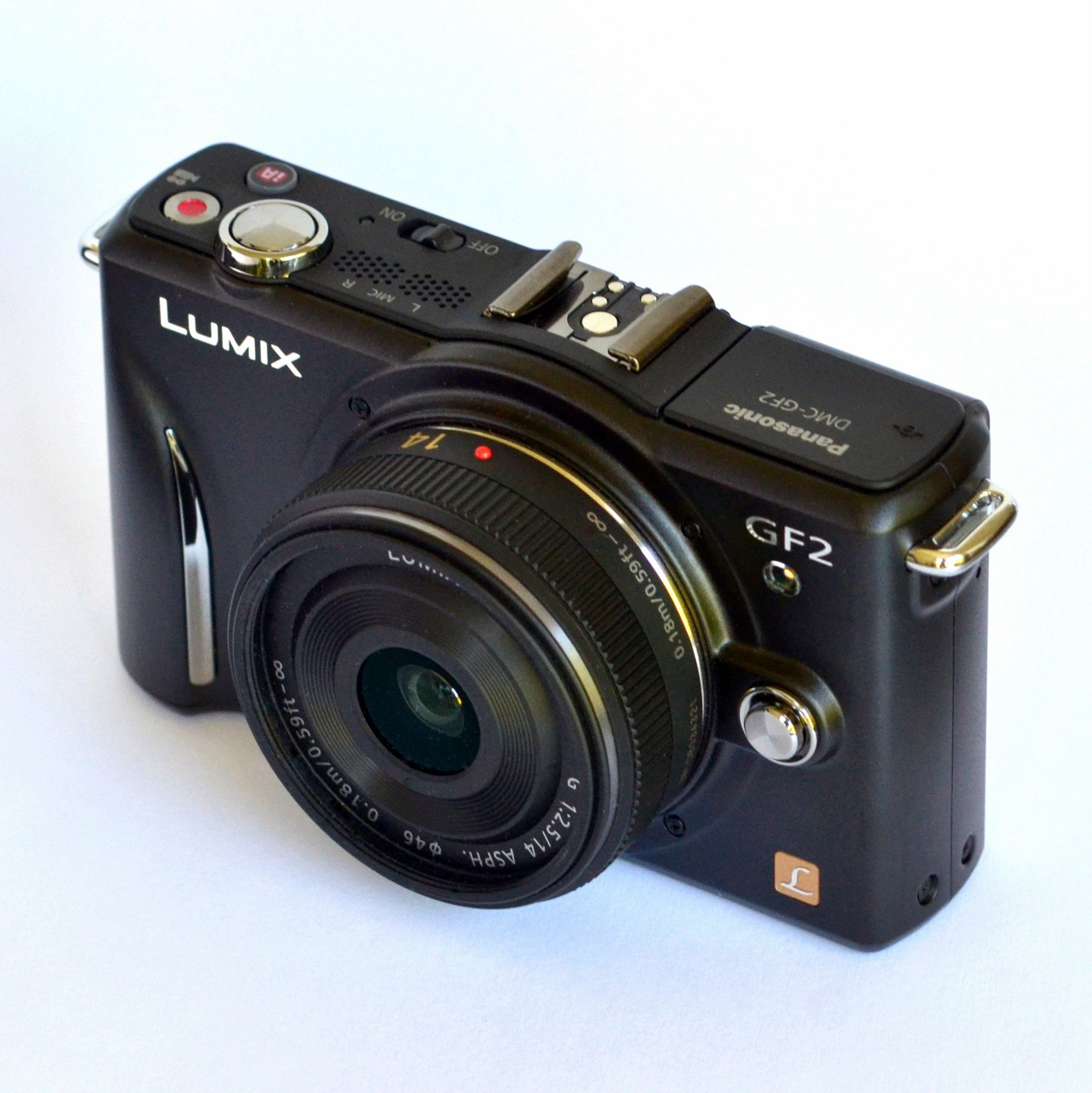
- Panasonic Lumix DMC-GF2 with the Panasonic 14 mm f/2.5 wide angle lens

Overview
- Maker: Panasonic Holdings Corporation
- Type: Micro Four Thirds System

Lens
- Lens: Micro Four Thirds System mount

Sensor/medium
- Sensor: 4/3 type MOS ('Live MOS sensor')
- Maximum resolution: 4000×3000 (12.0 megapixels)
- Film speed: ISO 100–6400
- Storage media: SD /SDHC /MMC

Focusing
- Focus modes: Auto Focus, Manual focus, Face Detection, AF Tracking, 23-Area-Focusing/1 Area Focusing, Single or Continuous AF, AF detection range: EV 0–18 (f/3.5 lens, ISO 100), Pre AF (Quick AF/Continuous AF), AF+MF, MF Assist(5x, 10x)

Exposure/metering
- Exposure modes: Program AE, Aperture priority AE, Shutter priority AE, Manual, iAuto, SCN, Movie, Custom (2)
- Exposure metering: 144-zone multi-pattern sensing system
- Metering modes: Multiple-Weighted, Center-Weighted, Spot

Flash
- Flash: Built-in-Flash, TTL, GN 6 equivalent (ISO100 · m)

Shutter
- Shutter: focal-plane
- Shutter speed range: 60–1/4000 sec
- Continuous shooting: 7 RAW images, Unlimited JPEG images with a fast card

Viewfinder
- Viewfinder: Optional External Electronic Viewfinder LVF1 color display, 100% field of view, 0.52x (35mm equiv), 1.04x magnification, with 202K dots equivalent

General
- LCD screen: 3.0" Low temperature Polycrystalline TFT LCD; touch sensitive; wide angle view
- Battery: 1010 mAh 7.2v Lithium-Ion rechargeable battery
- Dimensions: 112.8 mm x 67.8 mm x 32.8 mm (4.44 x 2.67 x 1.29 inches)
- Weight: Approx. 265 g (9.3 oz) (camera body), Approx. 365 g (12.9 oz) (incl. 14 mm lens, card and battery)

Panasonic Lumix DMC-GF2 is the sixth camera in Panasonic's Lumix G-series, using the Micro Four Thirds System.

The main GF2 innovation is the inclusion of a touch sensitive rear LCD screen which can be used to control mode, focus and operation of the camera. The Panasonic DMC-GF2 uses the touch screen to provide mode selection, as such that there is not a mode dial on the camera. Features including zoom and focus are controlled via the 3-inch touchscreen at the rear of the unit or by manual zoom and focus on the lens.

The GF-2 was offered in four variations, GF2 (body only); GF2C (body + 14 mm f/2.5 wide angle lens); GF2K (body + 14-42mm f/3.5-5.6 zoom lens; and GF2W (body + both 14mm and 14–42 mm lenses). Available colors were black (suffix K); silver (suffix S); white (suffix W); red (suffix R) and pink (suffix P).

== Features ==
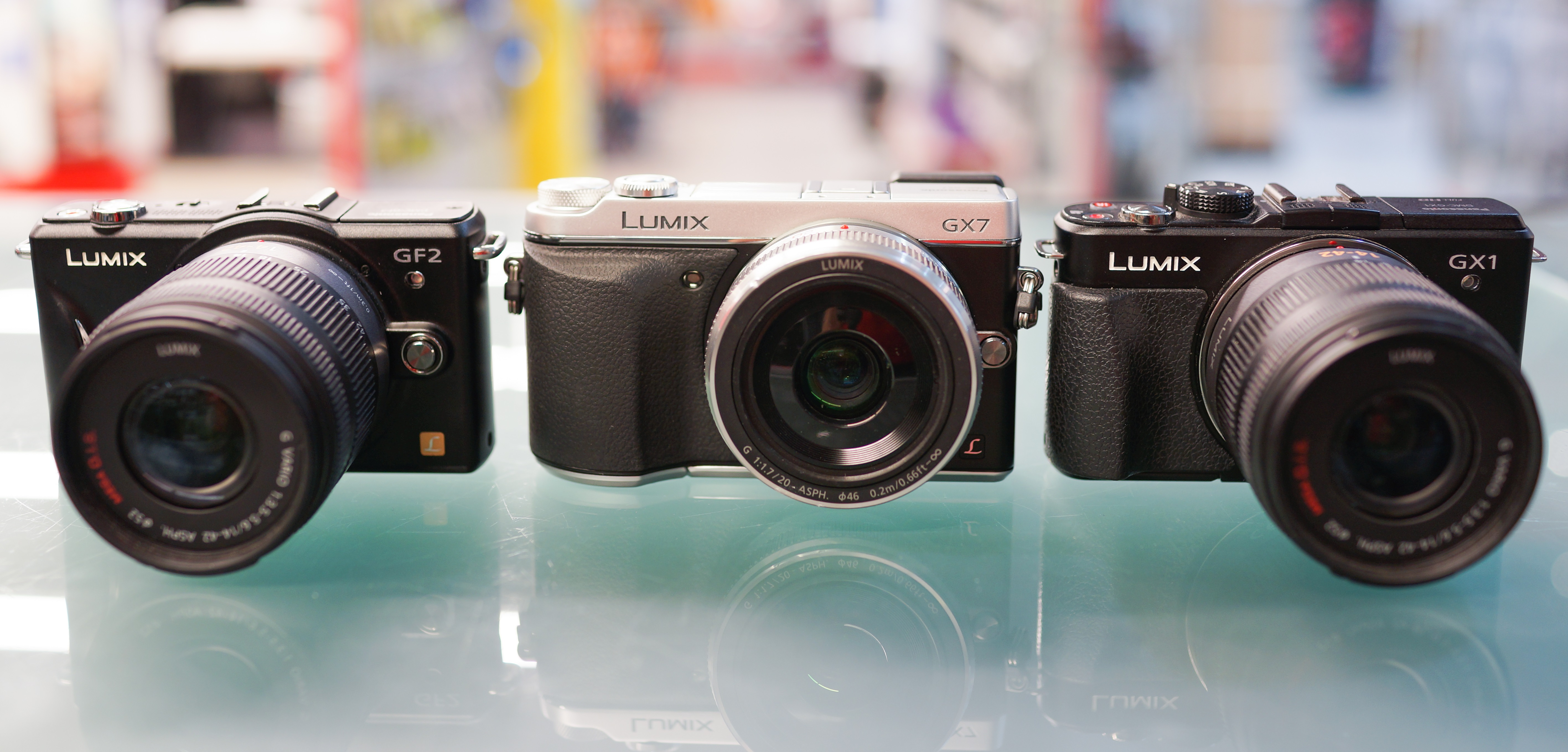
Comparison of GF2, GX7 and GX1.

== Firmware updates ==
=== Panasonic Releases ===
Panasonic has announced the following firmware update

Version	Release date	Notes
1.1 1.0	2011-October Original	Compatibility update for new Panasonic X class lenses with power zoom feature.: 1. Display of the local length When you zoom, the focal distance is displayed and you can confirm the zoom position.; 2. Step zoom When you operate the zoom, the zoom will stop at positions corresponding to predetermined distances.; 3. Zoom resume When you switch the power switch [ON], the zoom positions when you last switched [OFF] are automatically restored.; 4. Selectable zoom speed Users can select the speed of electric-powered zooming.; Original

== See also ==
- Olympus PEN E-P2
- Olympus PEN E-PL2
- Olympus PEN E-P3
- Olympus PEN E-PL3
- Panasonic Lumix DMC-GF1
- Panasonic Lumix DMC-GF3

== Micro Four Thirds Camera introduction roadmap ==
Item	Model	Sensor	Electronic View Finder (EVF)	Announced
1	Panasonic Lumix DMC-G1	4:3 / 13.1 mp (12.1 mp effective)	EVF; 1.4x magnification; 1.44M dots	2008, October
2	Panasonic Lumix DMC-GH1	4:3; 3:2; 16:9 (multi-aspect); 14.0 mp (12.1 mp effect)	EVF; 1.4x mag; 1.44M dots	2009, April
3	Olympus PEN E-P1	4:3 / 13.1 mp (12.3 mp effect)	optional hotshoe optical VF-1; 65 degree AOV	2009, July
4	Panasonic Lumix DMC-GF1	4:3 / 13.1 mp (12.1 mp effect)	opt hotshoe EVF LVF1; 1.04x mag; 202K dots	2009, September
5	Olympus PEN E-P2	4:3 / 13.1 mp (12.3 mp effect)	opt hotshoe EVF VF-2; 1.15x mag; 1.44M dots	2009, November
6	Olympus PEN E-PL1	4:3 / 13.1 mp (12.3 mp effect)	opt hotshoe EVF VF-2; 1.15x mag; 1.44M dots	2010, February
7	Panasonic Lumix DMC-G10	4:3 / 13.1 mp (12.1 mp effect)	EVF; 1.04x magnification; 202K dots	2010, March
8	Panasonic Lumix DMC-G2	4:3 / 13.1 mp (12.1 mp effect)	EVF; 1.4x mag; 1.44M dots	2010, March
9	Panasonic Lumix DMC-GH2	4:3; 3:2; 16:9 (multi-aspect); 18.3 mp (16.0 mp effect)	EVF; 1.42x mag; 1.53M dots	2010, September
10	Panasonic Lumix DMC-GF2	4:3 / 13.1 mp (12.1 mp effect)	opt hotshoe EVF; 1.04x mag; 202K dots	2010, November
11	Olympus PEN E-PL1s	4:3 / 13.1 mp (12.3 mp effect)	opt hotshoe EVF VF-2; 1.15x mag; 1.44M dots	2010, November
12	Olympus PEN E-PL2	4:3 / 13.1 mp (12.3 mp effect)	opt hotshoe EVF VF-2; 1.15x mag; 1.44M dots	2011, January
13	Panasonic Lumix DMC-G3	4:3 / 16.6 mp (15.8 mp effect)	EVF; 1.4x mag; 1.44M dots	2011, May
14	Panasonic Lumix DMC-GF3	4:3 / 13.1 mp (12.1 mp effect)	N/A	2011, June
15	Olympus PEN E-P3	4:3 / 13.1 mp (12.3 mp effect)	opt hotshoe EVF VF-2; 1.15x mag; 1.44M dots	2011, June
16	Olympus PEN E-PL3	4:3 / 13.1 mp (12.3 mp effect)	opt hotshoe EVF VF-2; 1.15x mag; 1.44M dots	2011, June
17	Olympus PEN E-PM1	4:3 / 13.1 mp (12.3 mp effect)	opt hotshoe EVF VF-2; 1.15x mag; 1.44M dots	2011, June
18	Panasonic Lumix DMC-GX1	4:3 / 16.6 mp (16.0 mp effect)	opt hotshoe EVF LVF2; 1.4x mag; 1.44M dots	2011, November
19	Olympus OM-D E-M5	4:3 / 16.9 mp (16.1 mp effect)	EVF; 1.15x mag; 1.44M dots	2012, February

Preceded by Panasonic Lumix DMC-GF1	Panasonic Micro Four Thirds System cameras November 2008–present	Succeeded by Panasonic Lumix DMC-GF3

Brand	Form	Class	2008	2009	2010	2011			2012	2013	2014	2015	2016	2017	2018	2019	2020	2021	2022	2023	2024	2025	2026
Olympus	SLR style OM-D	Professional															E-M1X ^{R}						
Olympus	SLR style OM-D	High-end									E-M1			E-M1 II ^{R}			E-M1 III ^{R}						
Olympus	SLR style OM-D	Advanced							E-M5			E-M5 II ^{R}					E-M5 III ^{R}						
Olympus	SLR style OM-D	Mid-range									E-M10		E-M10 II		E-M10 III			E-M10 IV					
Olympus	Rangefinder style PEN	Mid-range		E-P1	E-P2		E-P3				E-P5		PEN-F ^{R}										
Olympus	Rangefinder style PEN	Upper-entry			E-PL1	E-PL2		E-PL3	E-PL5		E-PL6	E-PL7		E-PL8	E-PL9		E-PL10						
Olympus	Rangefinder style PEN	Entry-level					E-PM1		E-PM2														
Olympus	remote													Air									
OM System	SLR style	Professional																	OM-1 ^{R}		OM-1 II ^{R}		
OM System	SLR style	High-end																				OM-3 ^{R}	
OM System	SLR style	Advanced																		OM-5 ^{R}			OM-5 II ^{R}
OM System	PEN	Mid-range																	E-P7				
Panasonic	SLR style	High-end Video													GH5S				GH6 ^{R}			GH7 ^{R}	
Panasonic	SLR style	High-end Photo													G9 ^{R}						G9 II ^{R}		
Panasonic	SLR style	High-end		GH1		GH2			GH3		GH4				GH5				GH5II				
Panasonic	SLR style	Mid-range		G1	G2		G3		G5		G6		G7	G80/G85			G90/G95						
Panasonic	SLR style	Entry-level			G10													G100			G100D		
Panasonic	Rangefinder style	Advanced							GX1		GX7		GX8		GX9								
Panasonic	Rangefinder style	Mid-range									GM1	GM5	GX80/GX85										
Panasonic	Rangefinder style	Entry-level			GF1	GF2	GF3		GF5		GF6	GF7	GF8	GX800/GX850/GF9		GX880/GF10/GF90							
Panasonic	Camcorder	Professional							AG-AF104														
Kodak	Rangefinder style	Entry-level										S-1											
DJI	Drone	.												Zenmuse X5S									
DJI	Drone	.												Zenmuse X5									
YI	Rangefinder style	Entry-level												M1									
Yongnuo	Rangefinder style	Android camera															YN450M		YN455				
Blackmagic Design	Rangefinder style	High-End Video							Cinema Camera														
Blackmagic Design	Rangefinder style	High-End Video									Pocket Cinema Camera					Pocket Cinema Camera 4K							
Blackmagic Design		High-End Video										Micro Cinema Camera									Micro Studio Camera 4K G2		
Z CAM	Cinema	Advanced											E1			E2							
Z CAM	Cinema	Mid-Range																E2-M4					
Z CAM	Cinema	Entry-Level															E2C						
JVC	Camcorder	Professional										GY-LS300											
SVS-Vistek		Industrial							EVO Tracer														
