= Panasonic Lumix DMC-GF1 =

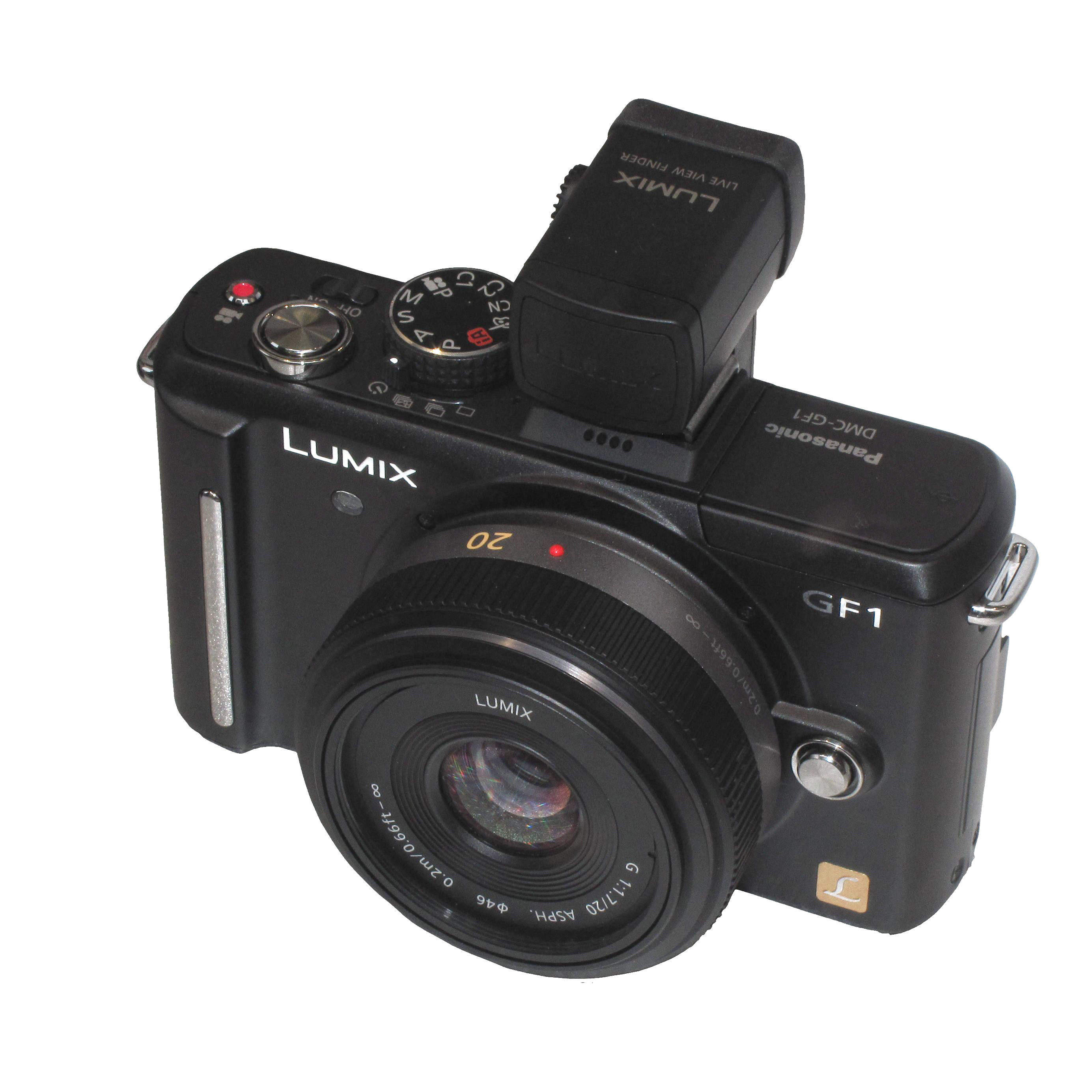
- The Panasonic DMC-GF1 (shown with the Panasonic Lumix 20mm lens and the optional electronic viewfinder)

Overview
- Maker: Panasonic Holdings Corporation
- Type: Micro Four Thirds system

Lens
- Lens: Micro Four Thirds system mount

Sensor/medium
- Sensor: 4/3 type MOS ('Live MOS sensor')
- Maximum resolution: 4000×3000 (12.0 megapixels)
- Storage media: SD /SDHC /MMC

Focusing
- Focus modes: Auto Focus, Manual focus, Face Detection, AF Tracking, 23-Area-Focusing/1 Area Focusing, Single or Continuous AF, AF detection range: EV 0–18 (f/3.5 lens, ISO 100), Pre AF (Quick AF/Continuous AF), AF+MF, MF Assist(5x, 10x)

Exposure/metering
- Exposure modes: Program AE, Aperture priority AE, Shutter priority AE, Manual, iAuto, SCN, Movie, Custom (2)
- Exposure metering: 144-zone multi-pattern sensing system
- Metering modes: Multiple-Weighted, Center-Weighted, Spot

Shutter
- Shutter speed range: 60–1/4000 sec
- Continuous shooting: 7 RAW images, Unlimited JPEG images with a fast card

Viewfinder
- Viewfinder: Optional External Electronic Viewfinder

General
- LCD screen: 3.0" Low temperature Polycrystalline TFT LCD
- Battery: 1250 mAh 7.2v Lithium-Ion rechargeable battery
- Dimensions: 119 mm × 71 mm × 36.3 mm (4.69 × 2.8 × 1.43 inches)
- Weight: Approx. 285 g (10.1 oz) (camera body), Approx. 448 g (15.8 oz)) (incl. 20 mm lens, card and battery)

Panasonic Lumix DMC-GF1 was introduced in September 2009 as the third camera in Panasonic's Lumix G-series, using the Micro Four Thirds system. It was the first model in the "GF" line, which is primarily distinguished from the other Lumix G cameras by the lack of an integrated electronic viewfinder.

== Features ==
The design of the DMC-GF1 is similar to that of the Olympus E-P1 which was introduced a few months earlier. The GF1 is 35% smaller than earlier G models. It has the same 12.1 megapixel sensor as the DMC-G1, 1280 × 720 HD recording in AVCHD Lite format, an optional hot-shoe mounted electronic viewfinder, and a 3-inch LCD with 460,000 dots. It was announced at the 2009 Internationale Funkausstellung Berlin consumer electronics exhibition. This model in the Lumix range was claimed by Panasonic as the world's smallest and lightest system digital camera with a built-in flash capability.

Although the GF1 is small it still offers many advanced features such as its high definition video recording capability. It offers most of the features of the larger G1, including high speed contrast detect autofocus and an identical sensor.

== Successor model ==
The GF1's successor, the Panasonic Lumix DMC-GF2 was announced in November 2010. The GF line has since been extended with the Panasonic Lumix DMC-GF3 (announced in June 2011), the Panasonic Lumix DMC-GF5 (announced in April 2012) and the Panasonic Lumix DMC-GF6 (announced in April 2013). Many enthusiasts decried the move away from the GF1's button driven interface and the omission of the top control dial in the GF2 and subsequent models. Because of this some feel that the Panasonic Lumix DMC-GX1 is the GF1's "spiritual successor".

Preceded by None - New Model	Panasonic Micro Four Thirds System cameras November 2008–present	Succeeded by Debatable - Panasonic Lumix DMC-GF2 or Panasonic Lumix DMC-GX1

Brand	Form	Class	2008	2009	2010	2011			2012	2013	2014	2015	2016	2017	2018	2019	2020	2021	2022	2023	2024	2025	2026
Olympus	SLR style OM-D	Professional															E-M1X ^{R}						
Olympus	SLR style OM-D	High-end									E-M1			E-M1 II ^{R}			E-M1 III ^{R}						
Olympus	SLR style OM-D	Advanced							E-M5			E-M5 II ^{R}					E-M5 III ^{R}						
Olympus	SLR style OM-D	Mid-range									E-M10		E-M10 II		E-M10 III			E-M10 IV					
Olympus	Rangefinder style PEN	Mid-range		E-P1	E-P2		E-P3				E-P5		PEN-F ^{R}										
Olympus	Rangefinder style PEN	Upper-entry			E-PL1	E-PL2		E-PL3	E-PL5		E-PL6	E-PL7		E-PL8	E-PL9		E-PL10						
Olympus	Rangefinder style PEN	Entry-level					E-PM1		E-PM2														
Olympus	remote													Air									
OM System	SLR style	Professional																	OM-1 ^{R}		OM-1 II ^{R}		
OM System	SLR style	High-end																				OM-3 ^{R}	
OM System	SLR style	Advanced																		OM-5 ^{R}			OM-5 II ^{R}
OM System	PEN	Mid-range																	E-P7				
Panasonic	SLR style	High-end Video													GH5S				GH6 ^{R}			GH7 ^{R}	
Panasonic	SLR style	High-end Photo													G9 ^{R}						G9 II ^{R}		
Panasonic	SLR style	High-end		GH1		GH2			GH3		GH4				GH5				GH5II				
Panasonic	SLR style	Mid-range		G1	G2		G3		G5		G6		G7	G80/G85			G90/G95						
Panasonic	SLR style	Entry-level			G10													G100			G100D		
Panasonic	Rangefinder style	Advanced							GX1		GX7		GX8		GX9								
Panasonic	Rangefinder style	Mid-range									GM1	GM5	GX80/GX85										
Panasonic	Rangefinder style	Entry-level			GF1	GF2	GF3		GF5		GF6	GF7	GF8	GX800/GX850/GF9		GX880/GF10/GF90							
Panasonic	Camcorder	Professional							AG-AF104														
Kodak	Rangefinder style	Entry-level										S-1											
DJI	Drone	.												Zenmuse X5S									
DJI	Drone	.												Zenmuse X5									
YI	Rangefinder style	Entry-level												M1									
Yongnuo	Rangefinder style	Android camera															YN450M		YN455				
Blackmagic Design	Rangefinder style	High-End Video							Cinema Camera														
Blackmagic Design	Rangefinder style	High-End Video									Pocket Cinema Camera					Pocket Cinema Camera 4K							
Blackmagic Design		High-End Video										Micro Cinema Camera									Micro Studio Camera 4K G2		
Z CAM	Cinema	Advanced											E1			E2							
Z CAM	Cinema	Mid-Range																E2-M4					
Z CAM	Cinema	Entry-Level															E2C						
JVC	Camcorder	Professional										GY-LS300											
SVS-Vistek		Industrial							EVO Tracer														
