= Panasonic Lumix DMC-GF6 =

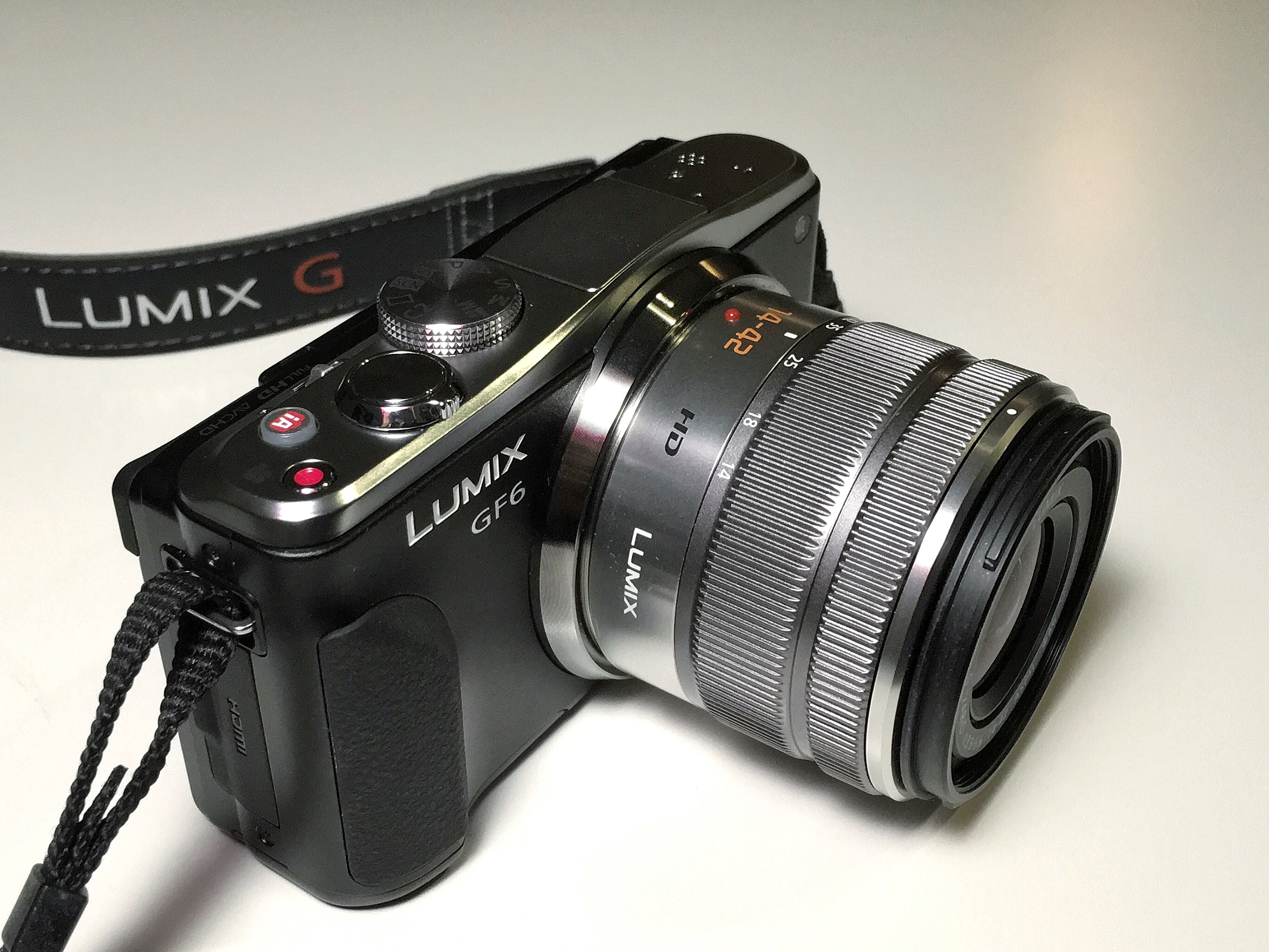

Overview
- Maker: Panasonic Lumix
- Type: Micro Four Thirds

Lens
- Lens mount: LUMIX G VARIO
- F-numbers: 3,5 - 5,6

Sensor/medium
- Sensor type: MOS
- Sensor size: 16 megapixels
- Film speed: 160-25.600
- Storage media: SD Memory Card, SDHC Memory Card, SDXC Memory Card

Flash
- Flash: built-in

Shutter
- Frame rate: 3 - 5
- Shutter speeds: 1 - 4.000

General
- LCD screen: 3" TFT Touch Screen rotatable LCD
- Battery: Li-ion Battery Pack (7.2V, 1205mAh)
- Dimensions: 111,2 x 64,8 x 38,4 mm
- Weight: 323 g (11 oz) with Battery and SD Memory Card

Panasonic Lumix DMC-GF6 is a Micro Four Thirds digital camera by Panasonic Lumix with a 16 megapixel resolution sensor. It is the successor to the GF5. The GF6 adds Wi-Fi with NFC, a 180 degree tilting screen and a mode dial with a customizable lever. It also has an improved grip and better ISO performance when compared to its predecessor. It comes bundled with the new Panasonic Lumix G Vario 14-42mm f/3.5–5.6 II Asph., Mega O.I.S., which boasts better build quality, a smaller design and improved sharpness.

== Property ==
- 16 Megapixels Live MOS sensor and Venus Engine
- Creative Panorama and Creative Control with 19 filters
- Self Shot mode with 180° revolvable LCD screen
- Wi-Fi and NFC for Smartphones
- Full HD movies 1.920 x 1.080 with stereo sound

Brand	Form	Class	2008	2009	2010	2011			2012	2013	2014	2015	2016	2017	2018	2019	2020	2021	2022	2023	2024	2025	2026
Olympus	SLR style OM-D	Professional															E-M1X ^{R}						
Olympus	SLR style OM-D	High-end									E-M1			E-M1 II ^{R}			E-M1 III ^{R}						
Olympus	SLR style OM-D	Advanced							E-M5			E-M5 II ^{R}					E-M5 III ^{R}						
Olympus	SLR style OM-D	Mid-range									E-M10		E-M10 II		E-M10 III			E-M10 IV					
Olympus	Rangefinder style PEN	Mid-range		E-P1	E-P2		E-P3				E-P5		PEN-F ^{R}										
Olympus	Rangefinder style PEN	Upper-entry			E-PL1	E-PL2		E-PL3	E-PL5		E-PL6	E-PL7		E-PL8	E-PL9		E-PL10						
Olympus	Rangefinder style PEN	Entry-level					E-PM1		E-PM2														
Olympus	remote													Air									
OM System	SLR style	Professional																	OM-1 ^{R}		OM-1 II ^{R}		
OM System	SLR style	High-end																				OM-3 ^{R}	
OM System	SLR style	Advanced																		OM-5 ^{R}			OM-5 II ^{R}
OM System	PEN	Mid-range																	E-P7				
Panasonic	SLR style	High-end Video													GH5S				GH6 ^{R}			GH7 ^{R}	
Panasonic	SLR style	High-end Photo													G9 ^{R}						G9 II ^{R}		
Panasonic	SLR style	High-end		GH1		GH2			GH3		GH4				GH5				GH5II				
Panasonic	SLR style	Mid-range		G1	G2		G3		G5		G6		G7	G80/G85			G90/G95						
Panasonic	SLR style	Entry-level			G10													G100			G100D		
Panasonic	Rangefinder style	Advanced							GX1		GX7		GX8		GX9								
Panasonic	Rangefinder style	Mid-range									GM1	GM5	GX80/GX85										
Panasonic	Rangefinder style	Entry-level			GF1	GF2	GF3		GF5		GF6	GF7	GF8	GX800/GX850/GF9		GX880/GF10/GF90							
Panasonic	Camcorder	Professional							AG-AF104														
Kodak	Rangefinder style	Entry-level										S-1											
DJI	Drone	.												Zenmuse X5S									
DJI	Drone	.												Zenmuse X5									
YI	Rangefinder style	Entry-level												M1									
Yongnuo	Rangefinder style	Android camera															YN450M		YN455				
Blackmagic Design	Rangefinder style	High-End Video							Cinema Camera														
Blackmagic Design	Rangefinder style	High-End Video									Pocket Cinema Camera					Pocket Cinema Camera 4K							
Blackmagic Design		High-End Video										Micro Cinema Camera									Micro Studio Camera 4K G2		
Z CAM	Cinema	Advanced											E1			E2							
Z CAM	Cinema	Mid-Range																E2-M4					
Z CAM	Cinema	Entry-Level															E2C						
JVC	Camcorder	Professional										GY-LS300											
SVS-Vistek		Industrial							EVO Tracer														
