= Olympus PEN E-P1 =

2009 MFT mirrorless camera

Olympus Pen E-P1
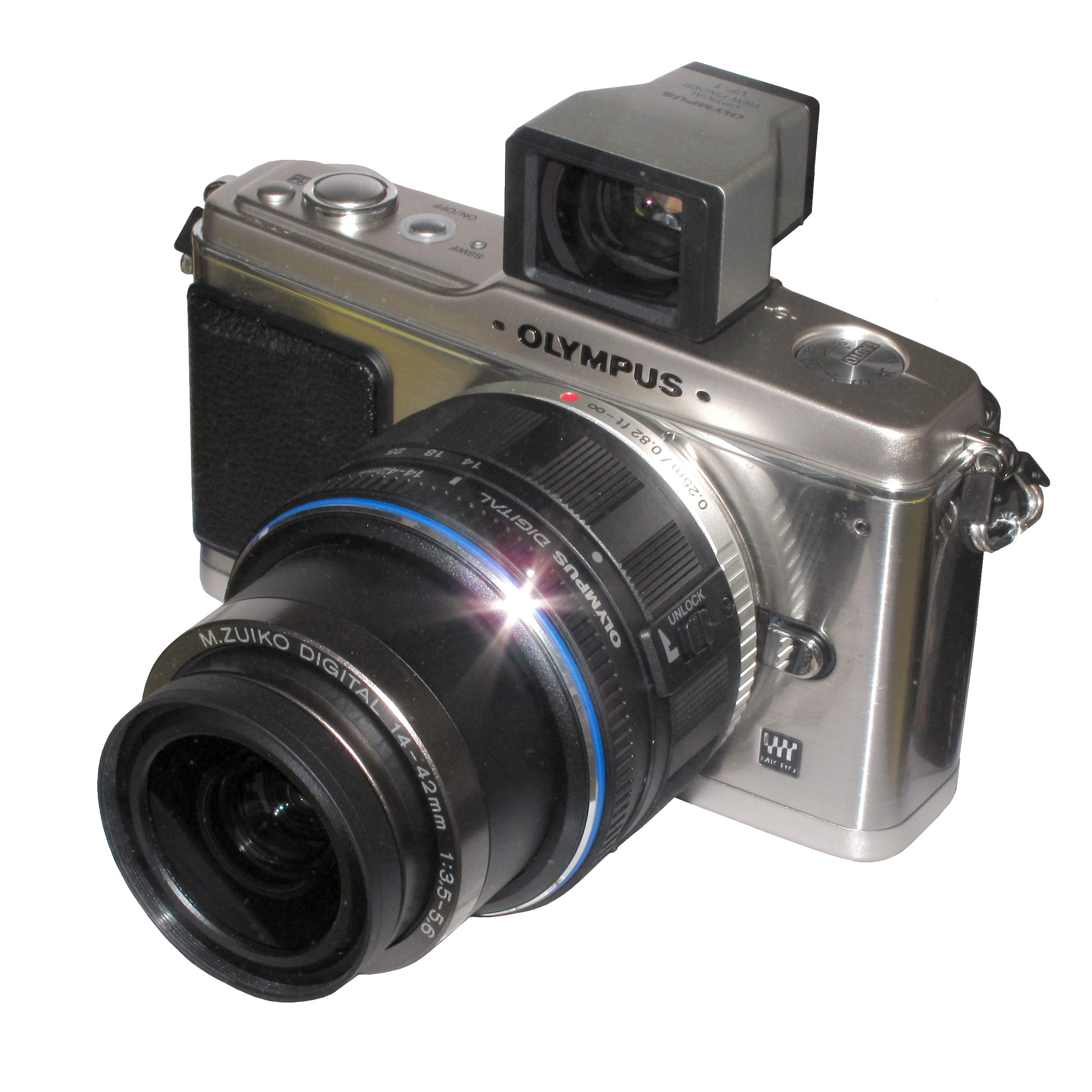

Overview
- Maker: Olympus Corporation
- Type: Micro Four Thirds, interchangeable lens camera
- Intro price: $899.99

Lens
- Lens: Micro Four Thirds System mount

Sensor/medium
- Sensor: Four Thirds System 18.00×13.50 mm Live MOS
- Maximum resolution: 4032×3024 (12.3 megapixels)
- Storage media: Secure Digital card

Focusing
- Focus modes: Single, continuous, manual
- Focus areas: 11 area contrast detect auto-focus, selectable

Exposure/metering
- Exposure modes: Program, shutter-priority, aperture-priority, manual
- Metering modes: ESP multi patterned, Center-weighted average (60%), Spot (2%)

Flash
- Flash: hot shoe allows for external flashes
- Flash synchronization: 1/250

Shutter
- Shutter: 1/4,000 to 60 s, 30 minutes bulb
- Continuous shooting: 3 frame/s

Viewfinder
- Viewfinder: live preview, optional optical viewfinder

General
- LCD screen: 3" 230,000 pixel TFT LCD on screen with live preview
- Battery: Olympus BLS-1 Lithium-ion battery
- Dimensions: 121×70×36 mm (4.8×2.8×1.4 in) (4.7" * 2.8" * 1.4")
- Weight: 335 g (11.8 oz)

The Olympus Pen E-P1 announced on 16 June 2009 is Olympus Corporation's first camera that adheres to the Micro Four Thirds (MFT) system design standard. The first camera to use the Micro Four Thirds mount was Panasonic's G-1 camera.

== Features ==
The design of the camera is reminiscent of the Olympus Pen half frame film cameras and is marketed as the Olympus digital PEN. The model presented on 16 June 2009 was very similar in looks to the Olympus Pen F. Initially, two micro 4/3 lenses were available from Olympus, one 14–42 mm f/3.5–5.6 zoom and a 17 mm f/2.8 pancake prime lens. Remarkably, with the exception of the optical viewfinder, the E-P1 seemed to fit most of the features found on the Olympus E-620, a larger Four Thirds system DSLR, into the small, compact MFT form factor.

In addition to Micro Four Thirds lenses, Olympus offers adapters allowing the use of Four Thirds lenses, or OM Zuiko lenses originally manufactured for use on the classic OM series of film SLR cameras that Olympus was famed for years ago.

The E-P1 does not have a built-in optical or electronic viewfinder, but instead uses the large 3-inch (76 mm) inch color "HyperCrystal" LCD on the back of the camera. The fixed LCD panel with anti-reflective coating presents a 100% live preview of the image as seen by the sensor. Olympus did offer an optional accessory hotshoe mounted optical viewfinder, the VF-1, that provided for a 17 mm lens angle of view

The E-P1 auto focuses using contrast-detection.

Other features include 720P30 video recording with the ability to process the video in camera with different effects.

In an interview, Mr Akira Watanabe, SLR Planning Department Manager for Olympus Imaging, said that for a number of reasons Micro Four Thirds was developed to meet the demands of those who wanted a DSLR, but without the size problems that come with one.

The 17 mm f/2.8 pancake lens or the 14–42 mm f/3.5–5.6 zoom lens are of the Micro Four Thirds lens mount which means they are smaller than Four Thirds lenses which require an adapter to fit the Micro Four Thirds body.

Several third-party manufacturers offer adapters for lenses of virtually all single-lens reflex and rangefinder systems, plus some cinema lenses.

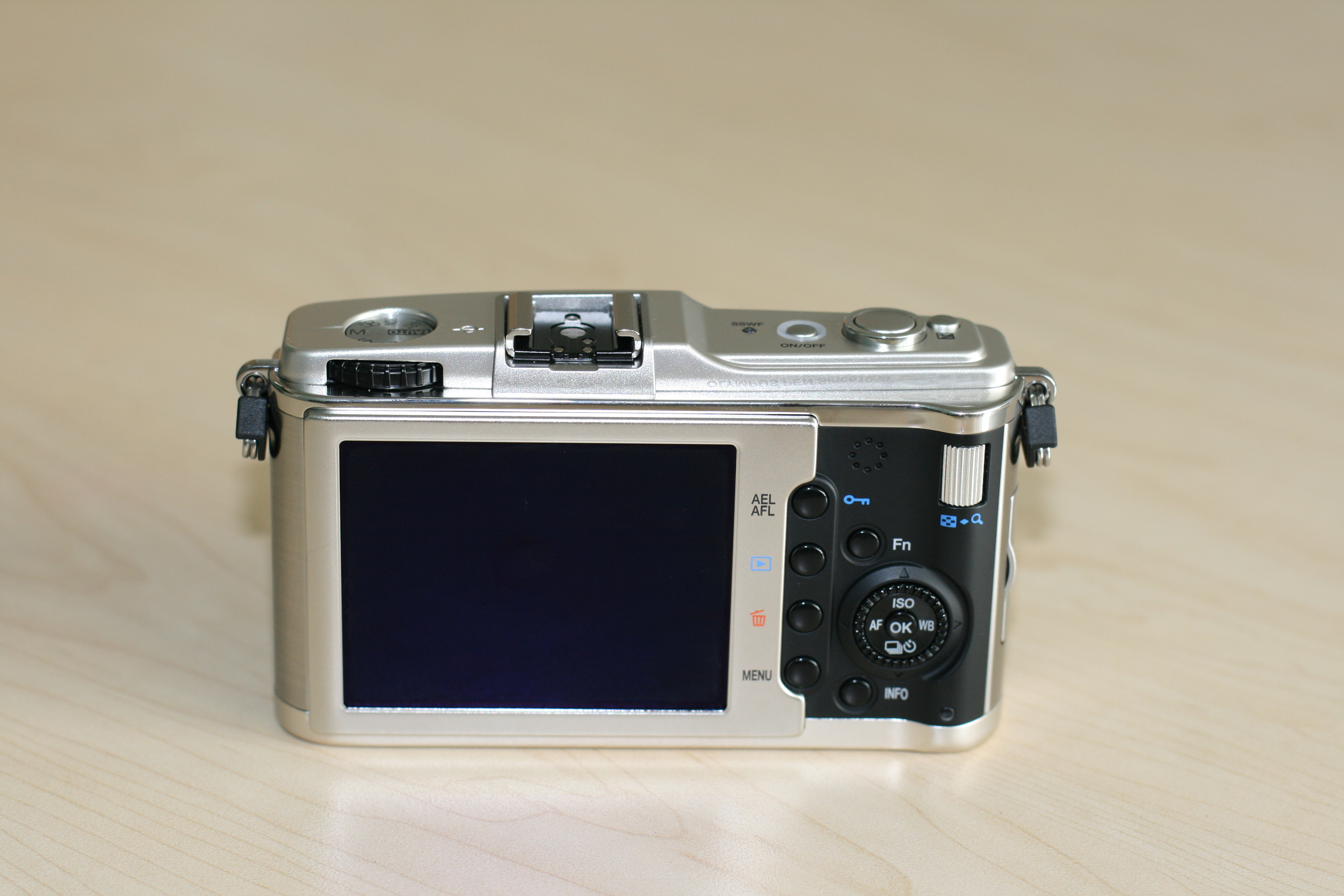

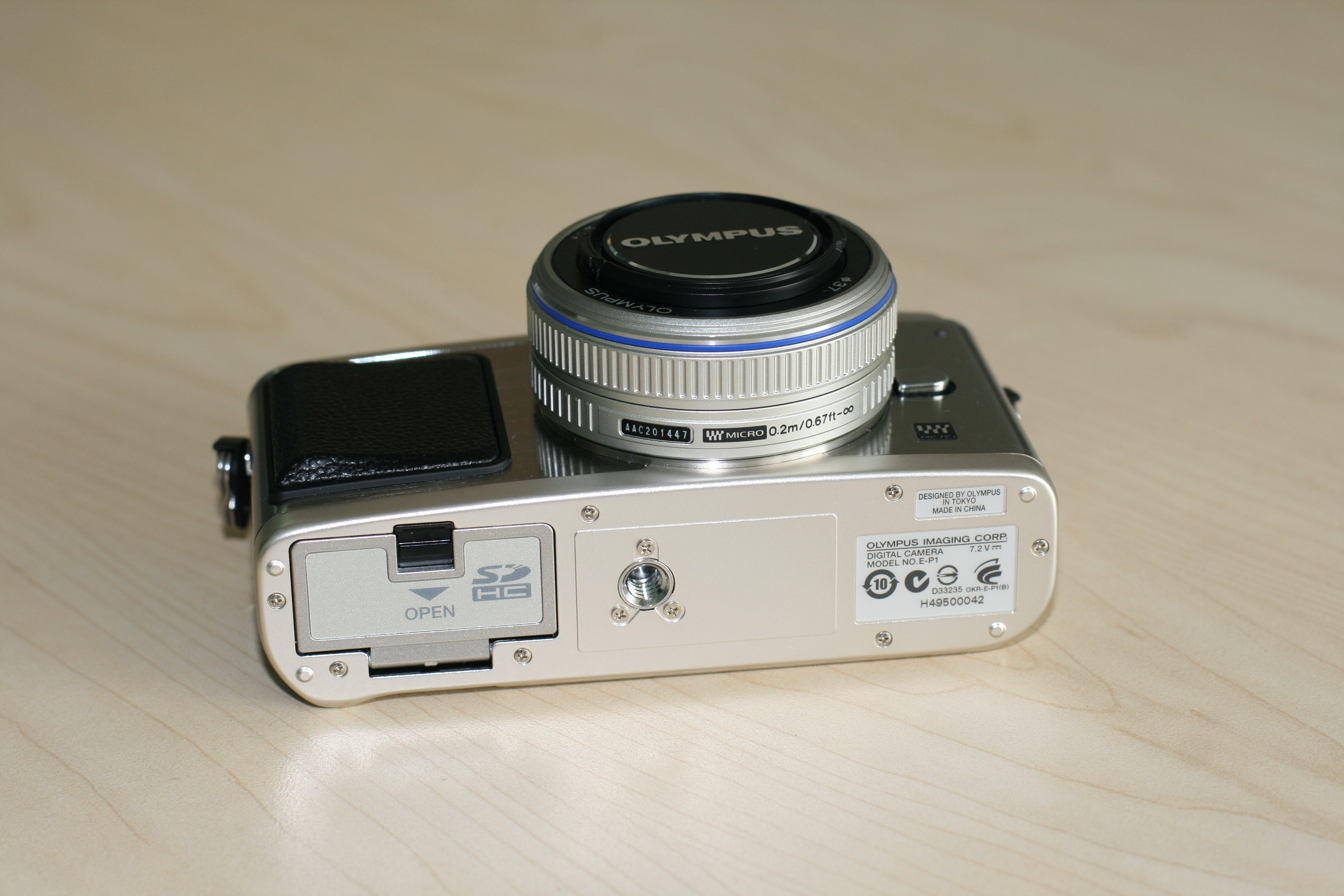

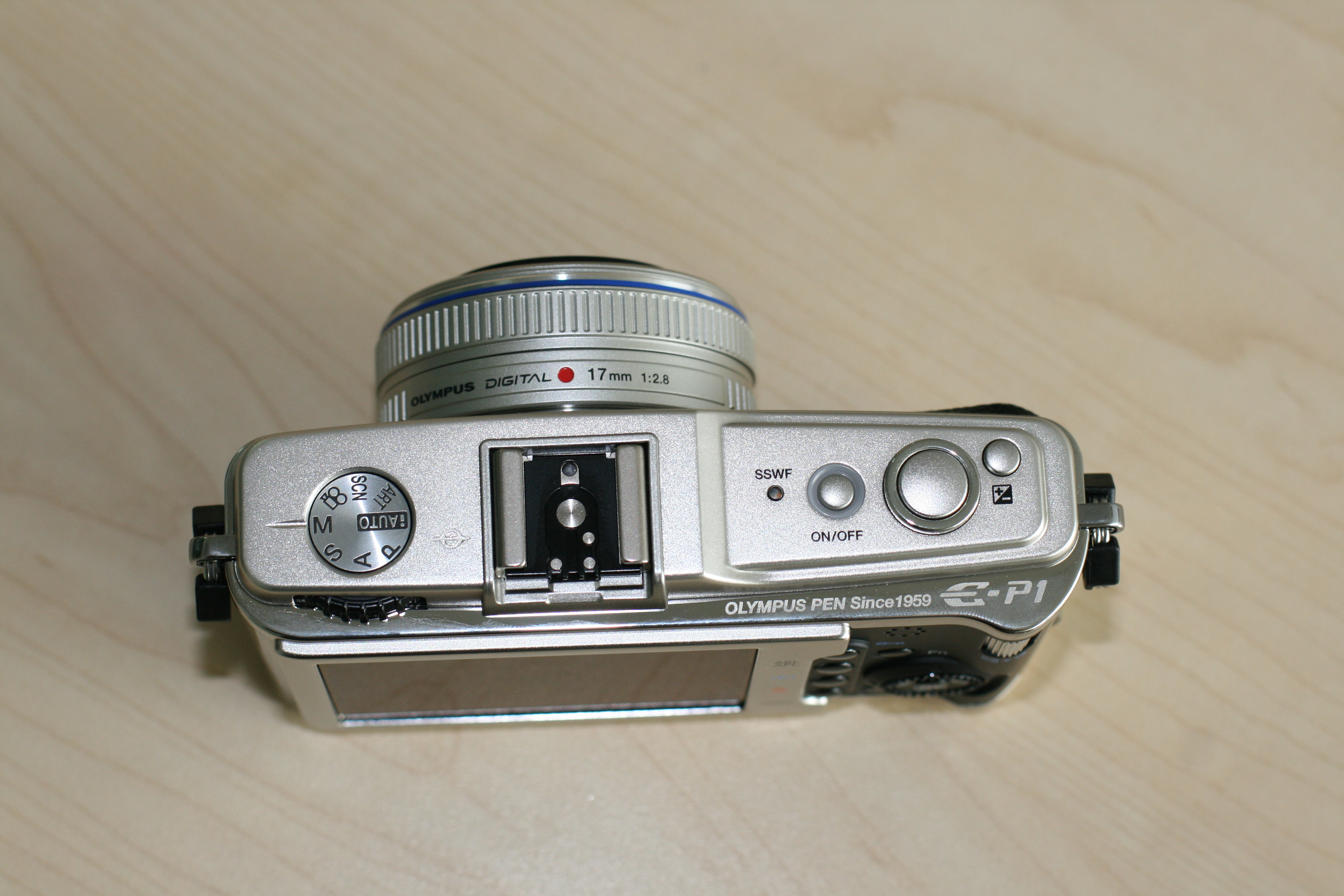

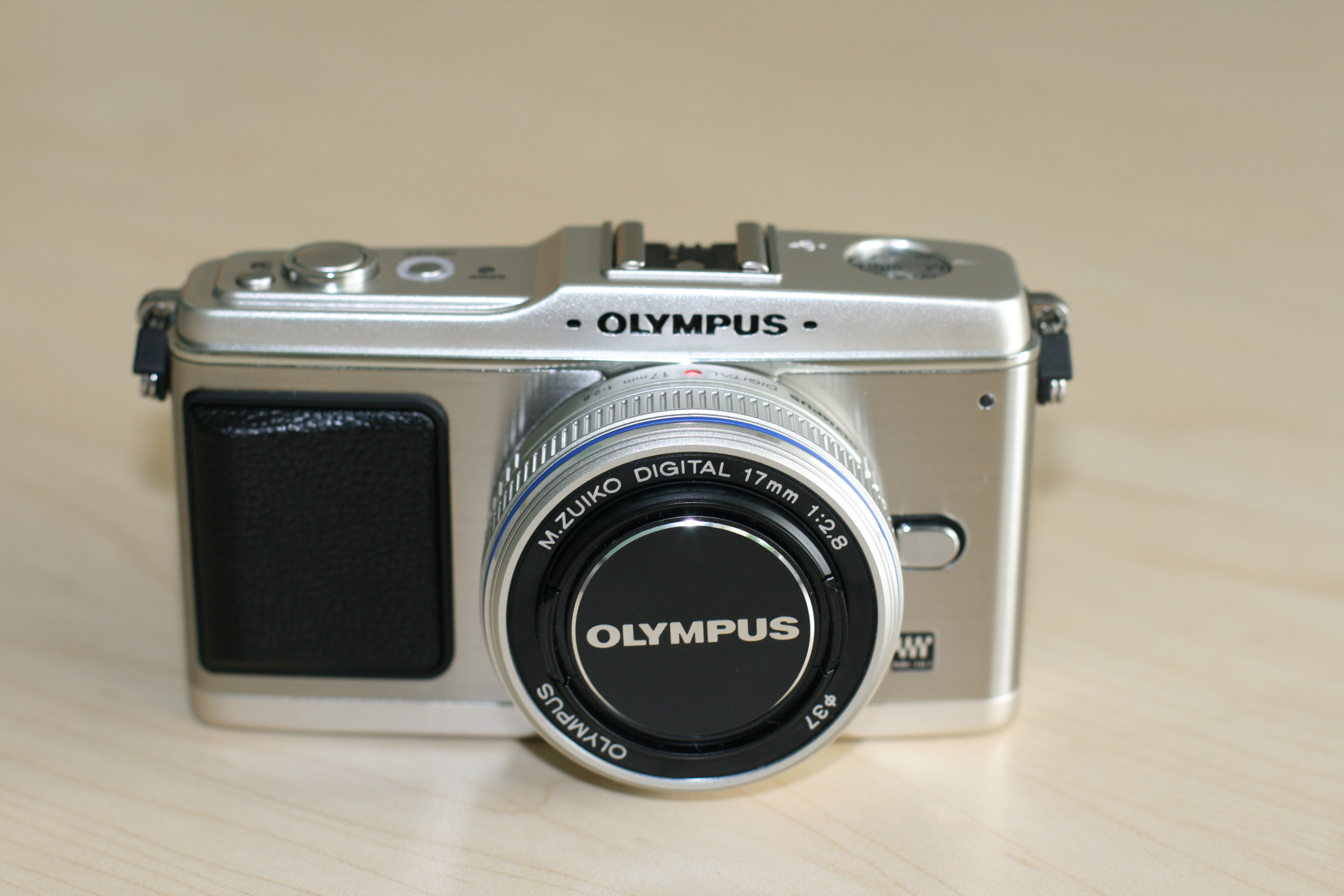

== Comparison with Panasonic Lumix DMC-G1 ==
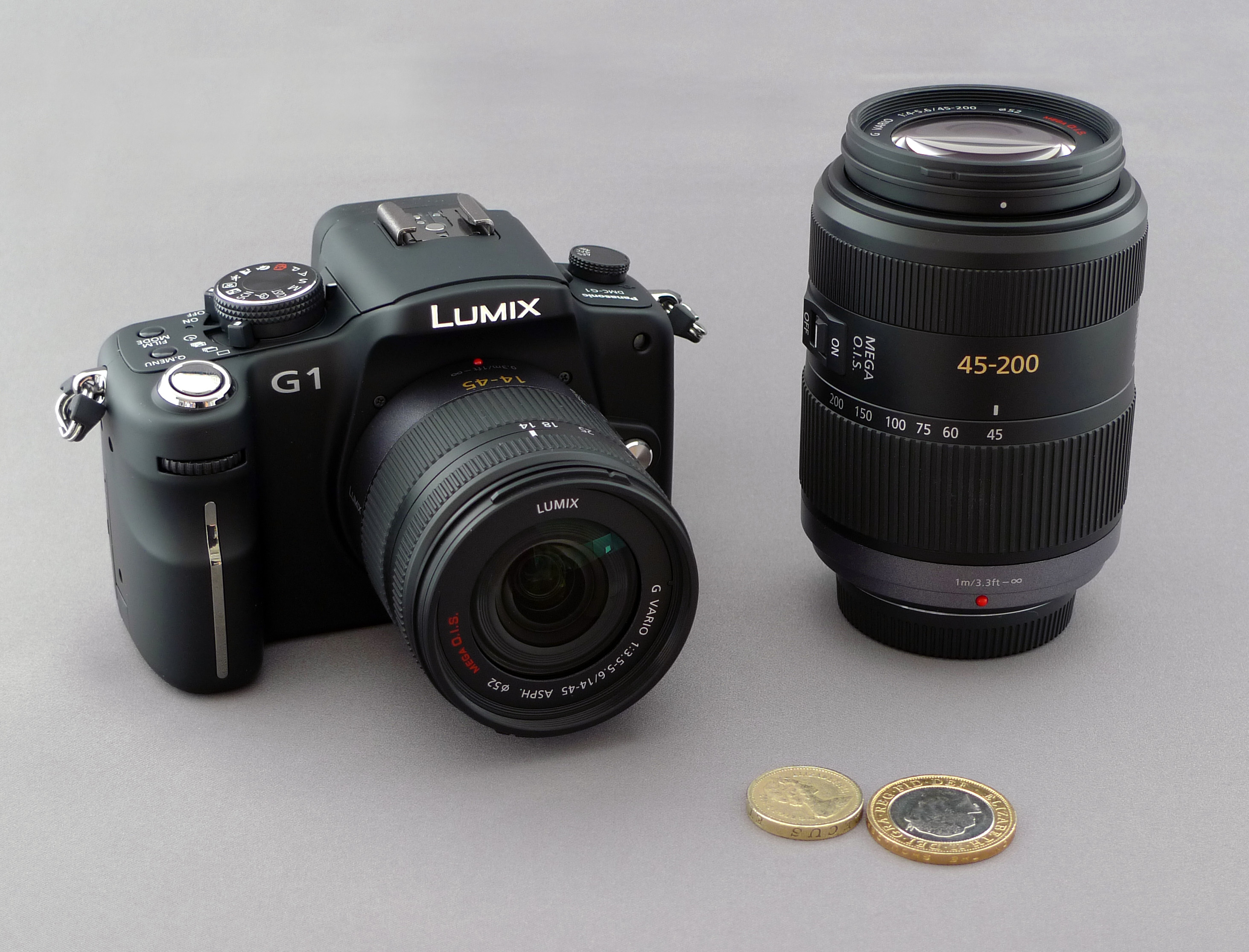
Panasonic Lumix DMC-G1, the only other Micro Four Thirds camera at the time of the E-P1 release

At the time of the announcement of the Olympus E-P1, there was one other Micro Four Thirds camera on the market, the Panasonic Lumix DMC-G1. The two cameras materialize two very different concept, but both are built around a Four Thirds sized sensor and the Micro Four Thirds lens mount.

The Panasonic G1's body is SLR-style, with the bump on the top of the camera, where the pentaprism is placed in SLR's, in the G1, it houses the electronic viewfinder. the E-P1 does not have one, so it is almost flat, which makes it a rangefinder-style mirrorless camera.

It is not only the styling though, the G1's ergonomics and handling are more like a DSLR camera. It has a much larger grip and dials and switches on the top, on the grip and a lot of buttons on the back and the top laid out loosely. The E-P1 has a smaller grip and a much tighter button layout. It has non-conventional controlling methods, like the mode dial, which is sunk in the top panel and controlled through the back, or one of the back dials, which is placed where usually the thumb is rested during the use of the camera.

The E-P1 has a premium aluminium construction, the G1 is made out of plastic.

In terms of features, the E-P1 offers more, which is not surprising, considering it started on $899 instead of $699. The E-P1 has a built-in 3 axis sensor stabilization system and video recording capabilities, 6400 maximum ISO, the G1 does not have any of these. However, the G1 has an adjustable angle display, an electronic viewfinder and a built-in flash.

== Successor models ==
The E-P1 was replaced by the Olympus PEN E-P2 which was announced in November 2009 and complemented by the low-end Olympus PEN E-PL1.

Preceded by None – new line	Olympus Micro Four Thirds system PEN cameras November 2008–present	Succeeded by Olympus Pen E-P2

Brand	Form	Class	2008	2009	2010	2011			2012	2013	2014	2015	2016	2017	2018	2019	2020	2021	2022	2023	2024	2025
Olympus	SLR style OM-D	Professional															E-M1X ^{R}					
Olympus	SLR style OM-D	High-end									E-M1			E-M1 II ^{R}			E-M1 III ^{R}					
Olympus	SLR style OM-D	Advanced							E-M5			E-M5 II ^{R}					E-M5 III ^{R}					
Olympus	SLR style OM-D	Mid-range									E-M10		E-M10 II		E-M10 III			E-M10 IV				
Olympus	Rangefinder style PEN	Mid-range		E-P1	E-P2		E-P3				E-P5		PEN-F ^{R}									
Olympus	Rangefinder style PEN	Upper-entry			E-PL1	E-PL2		E-PL3	E-PL5		E-PL6	E-PL7		E-PL8	E-PL9		E-PL10					
Olympus	Rangefinder style PEN	Entry-level					E-PM1		E-PM2													
Olympus	remote													Air								
OM System	SLR style	Professional																	OM-1 ^{R}		OM-1 II ^{R}	
OM System	SLR style	High-end																				OM-3 ^{R}
OM System	SLR style	Advanced																		OM-5 ^{R}		OM-5 II ^{R}
OM System	PEN	Mid-range																	E-P7			
Panasonic	SLR style	High-end Video													GH5S				GH6 ^{R}			GH7 ^{R}
Panasonic	SLR style	High-end Photo													G9 ^{R}						G9 II ^{R}	
Panasonic	SLR style	High-end		GH1		GH2			GH3		GH4				GH5				GH5II			
Panasonic	SLR style	Mid-range		G1	G2		G3		G5		G6		G7	G80/G85			G90/G95					
Panasonic	SLR style	Entry-level			G10													G100			G100D	
Panasonic	Rangefinder style	Advanced							GX1		GX7		GX8		GX9							
Panasonic	Rangefinder style	Mid-range									GM1	GM5	GX80/GX85									
Panasonic	Rangefinder style	Entry-level			GF1	GF2	GF3		GF5		GF6	GF7	GF8	GX800/GX850/GF9		GX880/GF10/GF90						
Panasonic	Camcorder	Professional							AG-AF104													
Kodak	Rangefinder style	Entry-level										S-1										
DJI	Drone	.												Zenmuse X5S								
DJI	Drone	.												Zenmuse X5								
YI	Rangefinder style	Entry-level												M1								
Yongnuo	Rangefinder style	Android camera															YN450M		YN455			
Blackmagic Design	Rangefinder style	High-End Video							Cinema Camera													
Blackmagic Design	Rangefinder style	High-End Video									Pocket Cinema Camera					Pocket Cinema Camera 4K						
Blackmagic Design		High-End Video										Micro Cinema Camera									Micro Studio Camera 4K G2	
Z CAM	Cinema	Advanced											E1			E2						
Z CAM	Cinema	Mid-Range																E2-M4				
Z CAM	Cinema	Entry-Level															E2C					
JVC	Camcorder	Professional										GY-LS300										
SVS-Vistek		Industrial							EVO Tracer													
