= Panasonic Lumix DMC-G1 =

2008 MFT mirrorless camera

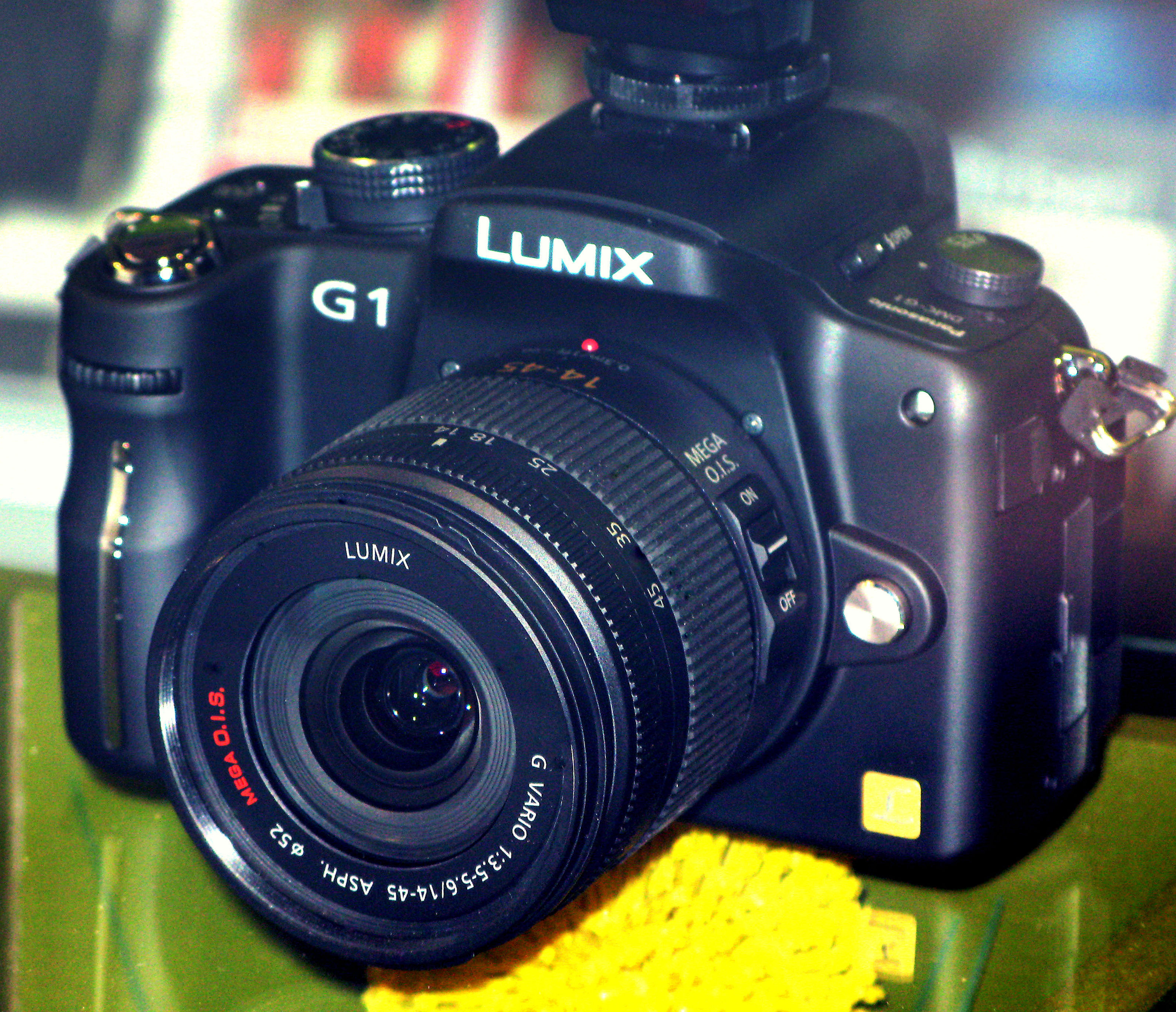

Overview
- Maker: Panasonic Holdings Corporation
- Type: Micro Four Thirds System

Lens
- Lens: Micro Four Thirds System mount

Sensor/medium
- Sensor: 17.3 mm × 13 mm Live MOS
- Maximum resolution: 4000×3000 (12.0 megapixels)
- Film speed: ISO 100–3200
- Storage media: SD, SDHC

Focusing
- Focus modes: Automatic or Manual Face detection / AF Tracking / 23-area-focusing / 1-area-focusing

Exposure/metering
- Exposure modes: Manual, Program, Automatic, Shutter Priority, Aperture Priority

Flash
- Flash: Built-in pop up, TTL, GN 11 equivalent (ISO100 · m)
- Flash bracketing: ±3.0 EV in ⅓ EV steps

Shutter
- Shutter speed range: 60–1/4000 sec

Viewfinder
- Viewfinder: EVF color display, 100% field of view, 0.7x (35mm equiv), 1.4x magnification, with 1,440K dots equivalent; LCD or articulated multi-angle 3-inch (76 mm) inch color LCD (460,000 dots equivalent)

Image processing
- White balance: custom modes

General
- Battery: Li-Ion 7.2 V, 1250 mAh
- Weight: body 385 g with 14–45mm lens 638 g

The Panasonic Lumix DMC-G1 was the first digital mirrorless interchangeable-lens camera (MILC) adhering to the Micro Four Thirds system design standard. The G1 camera is similar to the larger Four Thirds system format DSLR cameras, but replaces the complex optical path needed for the optical viewfinder with an electronic viewfinder EVF displaying a live view image directly from the sensor. Eliminating the mirror box and optical viewfinder allows for smaller and lighter camera bodies, while the less complex optical path also allows for smaller, lighter lens designs.

The DMC-G1 (also known as simply the "G1") was displayed for the first time at photokina 2008; it was available for sale in the United States and Europe in November 2008.

== Micro Four Thirds system ==
The Micro Four Thirds system standard uses the same sized sensor (nominal 4000 pixels by 3000 pixels) as the original Four Thirds system. One advantage of the smaller MFT system sensor (when compared to market leaders Canon and Nikon APS-C and full frame sized) is the ability to engineer smaller and lighter lenses since the smaller sensor allows for a reduced image circle.

== Features ==
The G1 camera and its lenses are smaller than competing DSLRs. It uses a sophisticated projection system to achieve a clearer, smoother image in its electronic viewfinder than in compact camera EVFs. As it lacks a separate autofocus sensor, the G1 uses contrast-detect autofocus, utilizing the readout from the main sensor. The performance of this AF system is comparable to the phase-detect systems in conventional DSLRs.

The G1 was packaged with a 14–45 mm ƒ/3.5–5.6 kit lens (28–90 mm equivalent) and can use all native Micro Four Thirds System lenses regardless of manufacturer. Four Thirds System lenses can be used with an adapter, although response time, especially focus response, can be slower. Legacy lenses from nearly every major manual focus camera mount, such as Leica M, Leica R, Olympus OM, Nikon F, Canon FD, Minolta SR, M42 Screw Mount, Contax/Yashica Mount and others can also be mounted and used in manual mode. Canon EF mount lenses can be used with an adapter. The Micro Four Thirds system specification supports lenses with optical image stabilization.

In many ways, the G1 was considered a landmark camera, kicking off a new market for mirrorless interchangeable lens system cameras. The camera was available in three colors: black (suffix K), red (R) and blue (A). Upon introduction the United States, MSRP for body and kit lens was set at USD 800.00

== Successor models ==
The G1's successor model is the Panasonic Lumix DMC-G2 which was announced in March 2010. The third model in the "G" line, the Panasonic Lumix DMC-G3, was announced in May 2011.

Preceded by None - first MFT model	Panasonic Micro Four Thirds System cameras November 2008–present	Succeeded by Panasonic Lumix DMC-G2

Brand	Form	Class	2008	2009	2010	2011			2012	2013	2014	2015	2016	2017	2018	2019	2020	2021	2022	2023	2024	2025	2026
Olympus	SLR style OM-D	Professional															E-M1X ^{R}						
Olympus	SLR style OM-D	High-end									E-M1			E-M1 II ^{R}			E-M1 III ^{R}						
Olympus	SLR style OM-D	Advanced							E-M5			E-M5 II ^{R}					E-M5 III ^{R}						
Olympus	SLR style OM-D	Mid-range									E-M10		E-M10 II		E-M10 III			E-M10 IV					
Olympus	Rangefinder style PEN	Mid-range		E-P1	E-P2		E-P3				E-P5		PEN-F ^{R}										
Olympus	Rangefinder style PEN	Upper-entry			E-PL1	E-PL2		E-PL3	E-PL5		E-PL6	E-PL7		E-PL8	E-PL9		E-PL10						
Olympus	Rangefinder style PEN	Entry-level					E-PM1		E-PM2														
Olympus	remote													Air									
OM System	SLR style	Professional																	OM-1 ^{R}		OM-1 II ^{R}		
OM System	SLR style	High-end																				OM-3 ^{R}	
OM System	SLR style	Advanced																		OM-5 ^{R}			OM-5 II ^{R}
OM System	PEN	Mid-range																	E-P7				
Panasonic	SLR style	High-end Video													GH5S				GH6 ^{R}			GH7 ^{R}	
Panasonic	SLR style	High-end Photo													G9 ^{R}						G9 II ^{R}		
Panasonic	SLR style	High-end		GH1		GH2			GH3		GH4				GH5				GH5II				
Panasonic	SLR style	Mid-range		G1	G2		G3		G5		G6		G7	G80/G85			G90/G95						
Panasonic	SLR style	Entry-level			G10													G100			G100D		
Panasonic	Rangefinder style	Advanced							GX1		GX7		GX8		GX9								
Panasonic	Rangefinder style	Mid-range									GM1	GM5	GX80/GX85										
Panasonic	Rangefinder style	Entry-level			GF1	GF2	GF3		GF5		GF6	GF7	GF8	GX800/GX850/GF9		GX880/GF10/GF90							
Panasonic	Camcorder	Professional							AG-AF104														
Kodak	Rangefinder style	Entry-level										S-1											
DJI	Drone	.												Zenmuse X5S									
DJI	Drone	.												Zenmuse X5									
YI	Rangefinder style	Entry-level												M1									
Yongnuo	Rangefinder style	Android camera															YN450M		YN455				
Blackmagic Design	Rangefinder style	High-End Video							Cinema Camera														
Blackmagic Design	Rangefinder style	High-End Video									Pocket Cinema Camera					Pocket Cinema Camera 4K							
Blackmagic Design		High-End Video										Micro Cinema Camera									Micro Studio Camera 4K G2		
Z CAM	Cinema	Advanced											E1			E2							
Z CAM	Cinema	Mid-Range																E2-M4					
Z CAM	Cinema	Entry-Level															E2C						
JVC	Camcorder	Professional										GY-LS300											
SVS-Vistek		Industrial							EVO Tracer														
