= Electronic viewfinder =

Viewfinder using a small screen

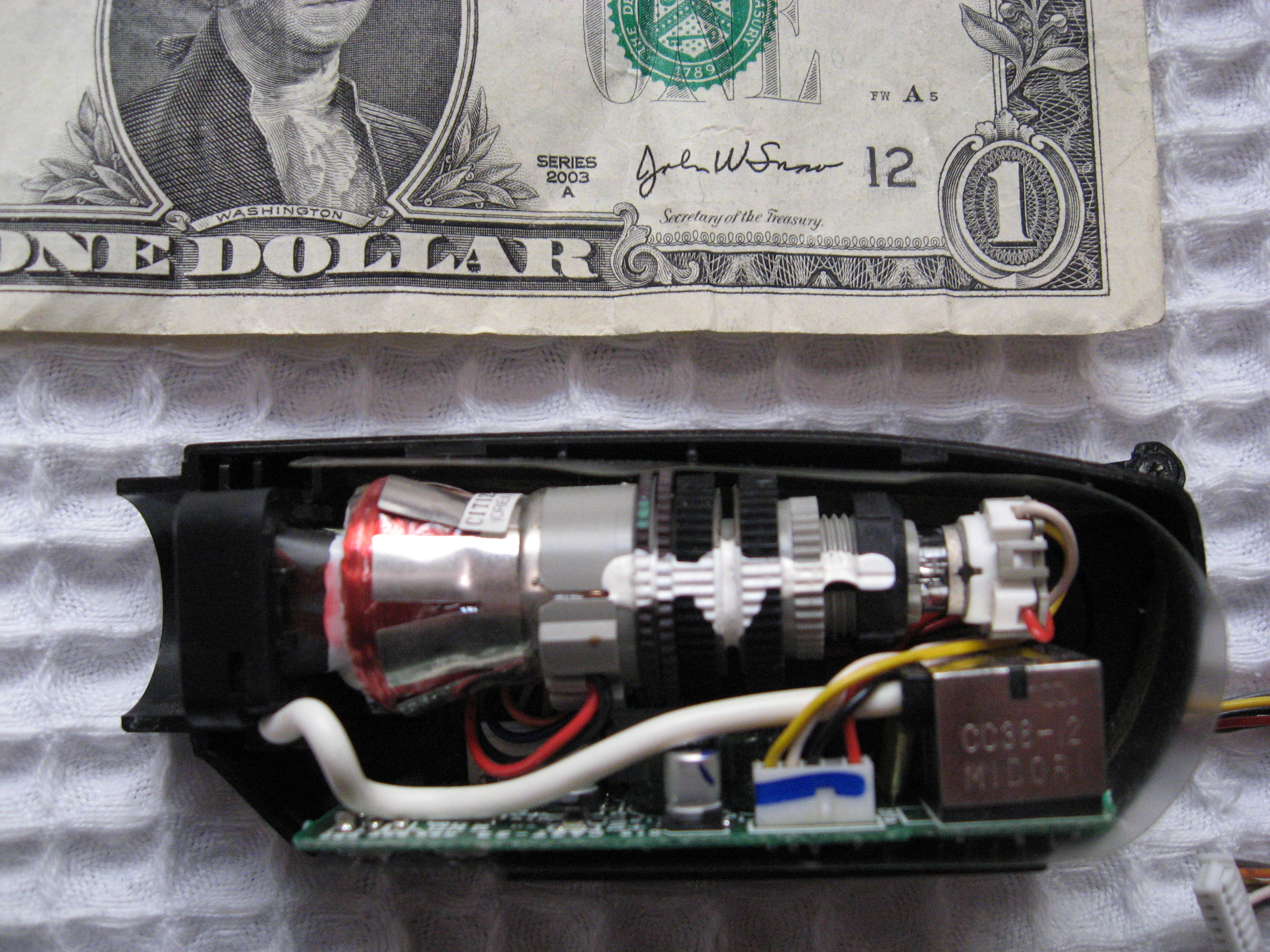
Old video camera viewfinder cutway; note the miniature CRT

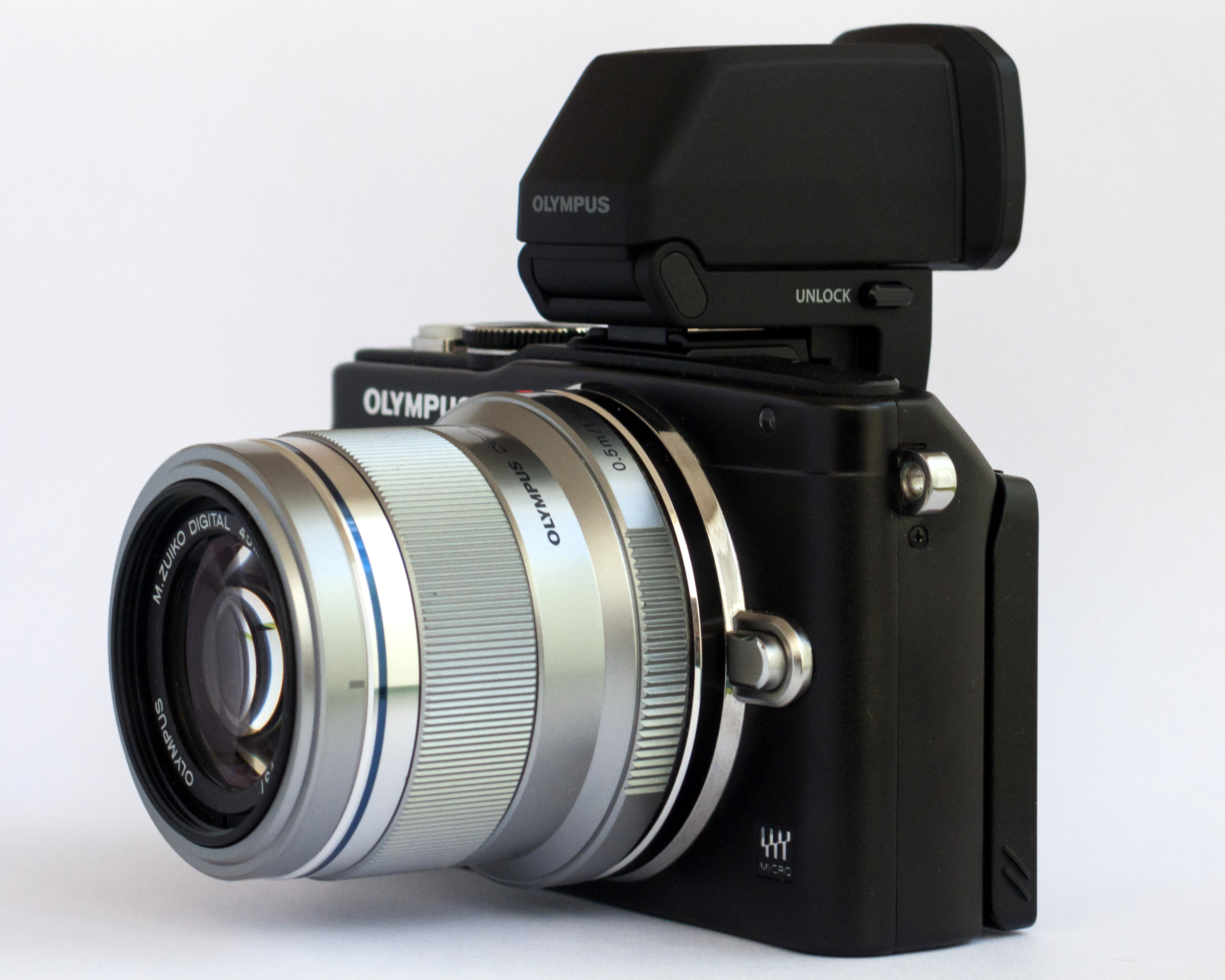
An Olympus PEN E-PL5 mounted with an external EVF unit: the Olympus VF-4

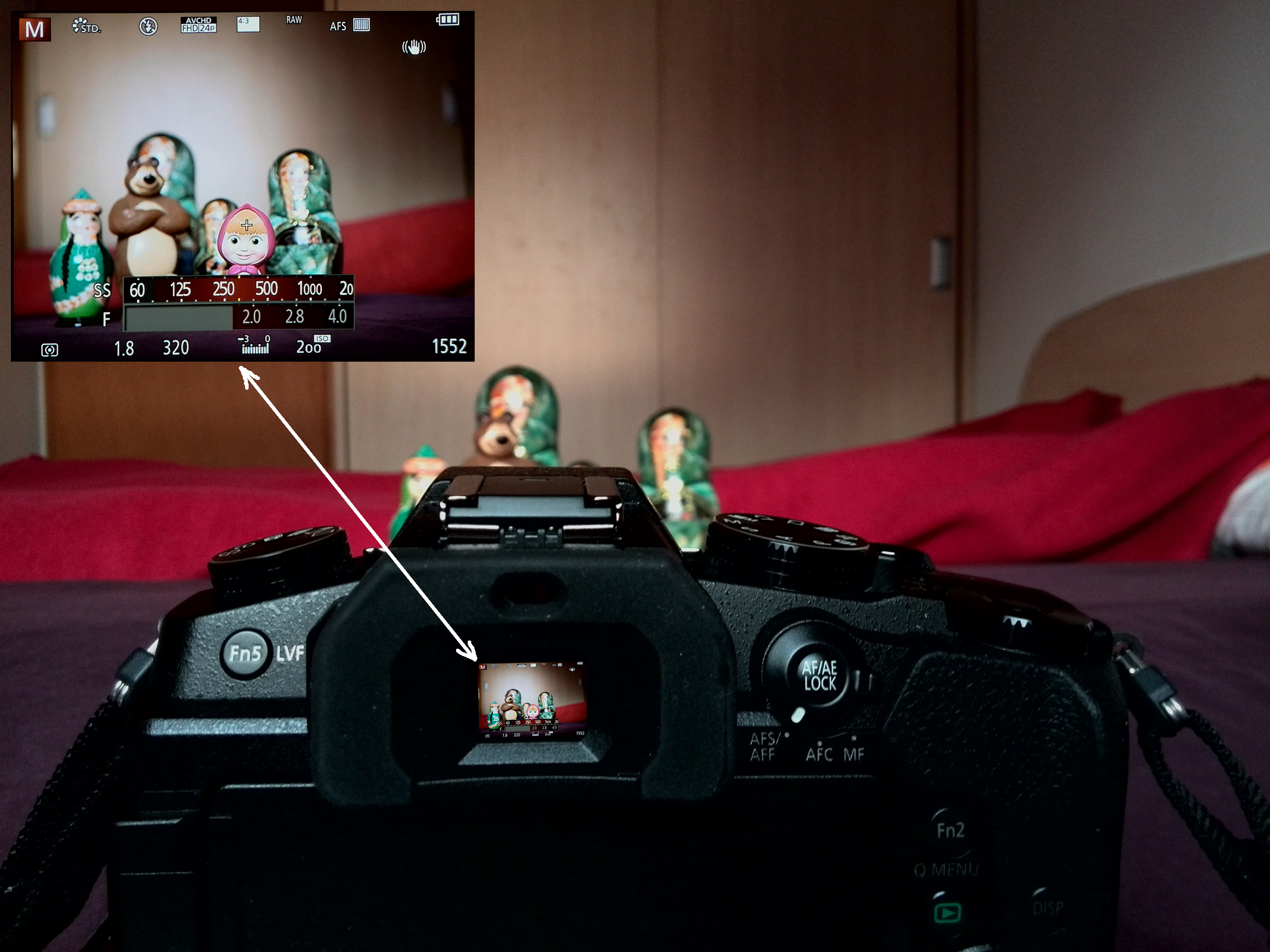
EVF of Panasonic Lumix DMC-G85/G80 with 2,360,000 dots.

An electronic viewfinder (EVF) is a camera viewfinder where the image captured by the lens is displayed on a small screen (usually LCD or OLED) which the photographer can look through when composing their shot. It differs from a live preview screen in being smaller and shaded from ambient light, and may also use less power. The sensor records the view through the lens, the view is processed, and finally projected on a miniature display which is viewable through the eyepiece.

Digital viewfinders are used in digital still cameras and in video cameras. Some cameras (such as Panasonic, Sony, Fujifilm) have an automatic eye sensor which switches the display from screen to EVF when the viewfinder is near the eye. More modest cameras use a button to switch the display. Some have no button at all.

While many cameras come with a built-in EVF, this is fixed in place and can only be used while holding the camera to the user's eye, which may not be convenient. Other cameras don't come with an EVF at all, or come with a low quality one. It is sometimes possible to get a separate, attachable EVF to use in these cases. In certain higher end models such as the Alexa Series by ARRI, an external viewfinder is the default way of monitoring what is being shot.

== Comparison with optical viewfinders ==
Whereas EVFs use a digital screen to display a representation of the scene captured by a camera, an optical viewfinder (OVF) typically uses a prism and mirror to direct the image coming through the camera's lens to the viewfinder. An EVF enables the user to view previously taken photographs and use the camera's menu system while looking through the viewfinder, which is not possible with an OVF. It also allows the use of features such as focus peaking (colourful lines displayed on screen to indicate which parts of the scene are in focus which helps with focussing and composing a shot) and zebras (which help with setting exposure by indicating on screen when a part of the image will be overexposed with the current camera settings). The digital preview shown in an EVF incorporates the camera's settings (including exposure, white balance, etc.) and so the image seen can be an exact preview of what the taken photograph will look like, which is not possible with an OVF.

OVFs may be better suited to use in low light or situations with very big differences in brightness due to the dynamic range limitations of an electronic screen. There is also no time lag with an OVF, whereas an EVF might take a bit of time to process the image and update the display (particularly when using longer exposure times).

To get the advantage of both optical and digital viewfinders some cameras have hybrid viewfinders. These display the image in an optical eyepiece viewfinder, or digitally on an LCD screen. Examples include some Fujifilm X-series cameras.

== See also ==
- Digital photography
- Zoom-lens reflex camera
