= GX-1 =

GX-1 may refer to:

- Yamaha GX-1, musical instrument
- Panasonic Lumix DMC-GX1, camera model
- GX-1 (bus)
