= GX9 =

GX9 or gx9 may refer to:

- gx9, an alternate name of the South Korean girl group Gugudan
- Panasonic Lumix DC-GX9, a mirrorless interchangeable-lens camera model
- Geely GX9, a crossover SUV
- OneSat GX9, alternative name of the OneSat Inmarsat-7 F3, a telecommunications satellite bus
- Shaanxi GX-9, a variant of the Shaanxi Y-9, a military transport aircraft
