= GX7 =

GX7 may refer to:

- Geely GX7, a 2012–2016 Chinese compact SUV
- Panasonic Lumix DMC-GX7, a compact mirrorless interchangeable lens camera
