= GM PD-4103 =

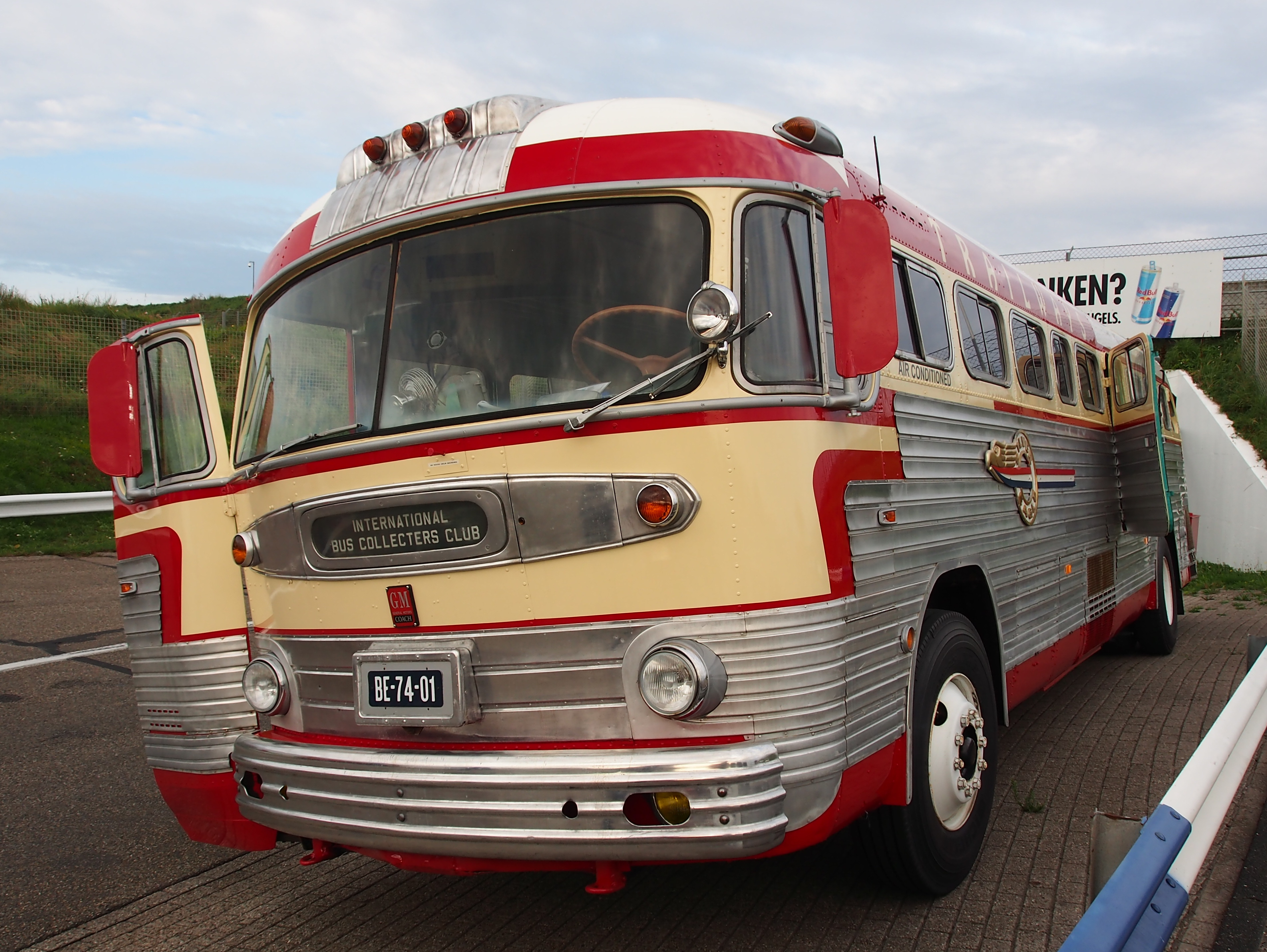
- A preserved PD-4103 in 2014

Overview
- Manufacturer: General Motors Truck and Coach Division (GMC)
- Production: 1951-1952

Body and chassis
- Class: Motorcoach
- Body style: Single-decker bus
- Layout: rear-engine
- Doors: 1
- Floor type: High-floor
- Related: GM PD-4102

Powertrain
- Engine: Detroit Diesel 6-71 inline-6
- Transmission: 4-speed Spicer/GM manual

Dimensions
- Wheelbase: 247.0 in (6,270 mm)
- Length: 420.0 in (35 ft; 10,668 mm)
- Width: 96.0 in (2,440 mm)
- Height: 115.7 in (2,938.4 mm)
- Curb weight: 30,000 lb (14,000 kg) GVWR

Chronology
- Predecessor: GM PD-4101; GM-PD-4102
- Successor: GM PD-4104; GM PD-4501 Scenicruiser

The GM PD-4103 was a single-decker coach built by GMC, in the United States, in 1951 and 1952. It was a 37- or 41-passenger Parlor-series highway coach and was an improved version of the earlier PD-4102 "transition" model. A total of 1501 were built, 900 in 1951 and 600 in 1952, plus one that was converted by GMC from a PD-4102. In early 1953, this model was replaced by the groundbreaking PD-4104 "Highway Traveler". The PD-4103 competed directly with, and surpassed in sales, a similar model from ACF-Brill Corporation, the IC41.

== Development and description ==
The GM Truck and Coach PD-4103 was the last in a series of low-budget "conversion" parlor coach models which were, in actuality, based upon the basic Yellow Coach/GM Truck and Coach transit bus models which first appeared in 1940. Favored GM customer Greyhound Lines had already been given a near monopoly on the PDA-3701/PD-3751 "Old Silversides" models, which were in part designed by Greyhound themselves. In order to answer complaints from arch competitor Trailways and other independent operators about being locked out from purchasing the PD-3751 model, GM simply took their existing 96" wide, 35' long suburban transit model, added more luggage bay space underneath, added sliding highway-style side windows, added reclining seating, and shortened the overhung portion of the front end by moving the front axle forward using a new front end from the wartime Yellow Coach "Victory Cruiser" model. This was the PD-4101, which appeared shortly after the end of World War II. GM created the model PD-4102 by restyling its PD-4101 in 1950 using a distinctive new front end with the destination sign below the windshield and a new, restyled rear end which used a full-width engine access door, an aluminum alloy bumper to match that on the front and a "post-less" picture window in the rear which used biradial curved glass (a new development by GM supplier, Libbey-Owens-Ford), replacing the divided flat transit bus-type rear windows found on the PD-4101. The front end styling job on the PD-4102 was reactionary, as it closely mimicked the striking styling of the IC41 intercity bus built by ACF-Brill Corporation in 1947-1954, a model bought in large quantities by Trailways to compete with Greyhound Lines' successful and much more efficient PD-3701/PD-3751 "Silversides" models. Mechanically and electrically, however, the PD-4102 was mostly a carry-over model from the PD-4101, including the optional refrigeration unit for air conditioning which used a four cylinder Continental "pony motor" driving an Ingersoll-Rand "oil-less" rotary vane compressor rated at five tons, a unit identical to that used by the PDA-3501/PD-3751 for Greyhound Lines. Only 116 were built.

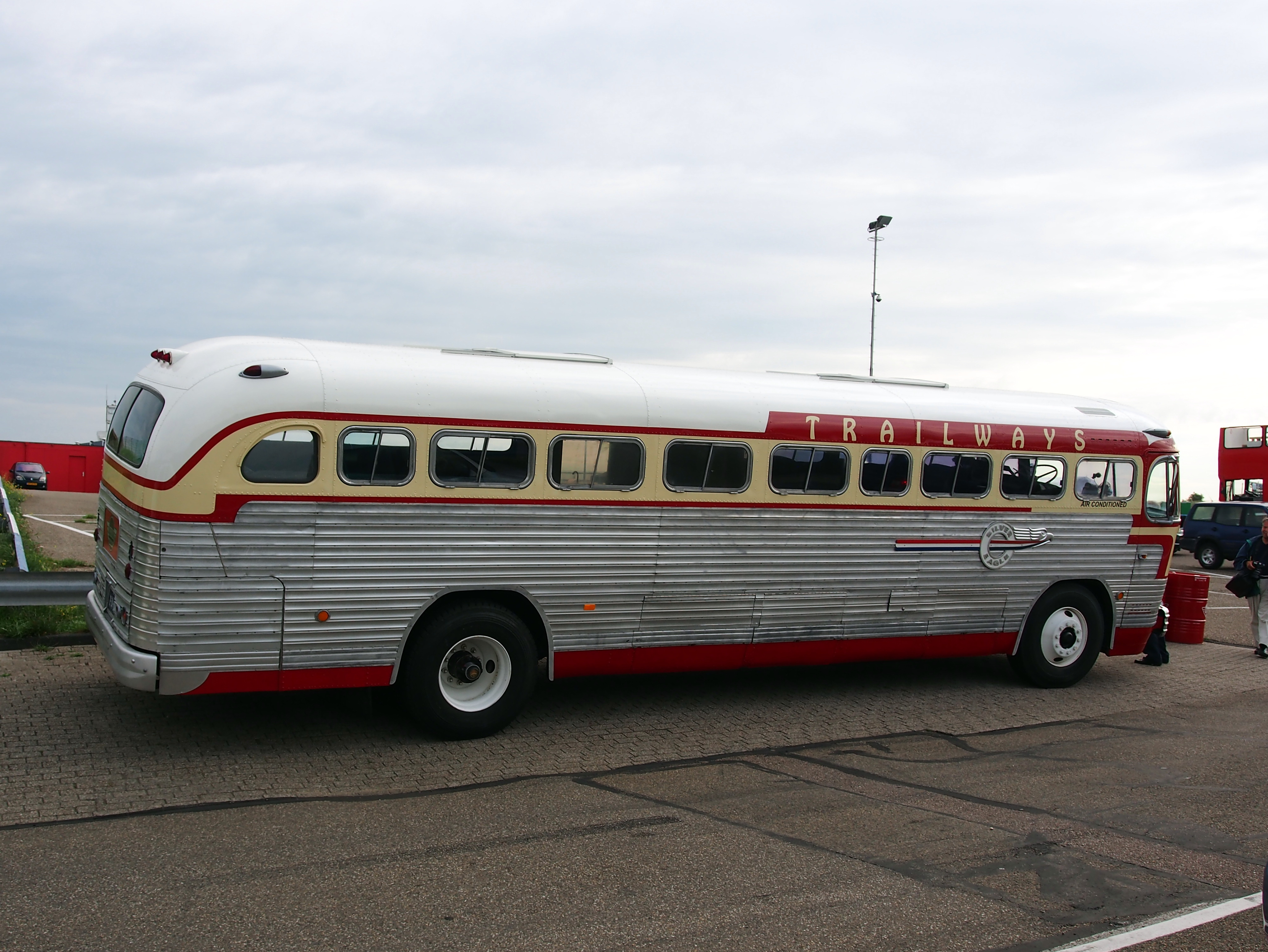
Right side view

In 1951 GM incorporated several small body, mechanical and electrical improvements into the model, enough to warrant the change once again of the model number to PD-4103. The easiest spotting features of a PD-4103 over the rare PD-4102 are that the later model included a rear luggage bay door on the left side that did not appear on either the PD-4101 or PD-4102, as well as an improved refrigeration system, using the same Ingersoll-Rand rotary vane compressor as previous models, but with a larger evaporator coil using a better expansion valve and a larger supply fan located over the rear passengers' seats. To further improve air circulation and fresh air intake, exhaust fans were incorporated into the soffit at the head of each interior luggage rack, which operated from the same rheostat that controlled the main blower. Also included was a new, higher rated Delco generator and an improved voltage regulator, a redesigned reverse gear solenoid on the transmission, various evolutionary improvements to the 6-71 GM Diesel (tougher alloy exhaust valves and improved S-55 injectors as standard) and other miscellaneous minor improvements, including the addition of a "black light" instrument panel, in which the instruments had radium painted figures, very similar to what Ford introduced on their 1950 Ford passenger cars. Production of this bus totaled 1,501 with Greyhound Lines buying a substantial quantity. Many also operated for Trailways and other operators. Trailways sorely needed the GM Diesels, as the Hall-Scott 190-powered IC41 Brills had notoriously heavy fuel consumption, often achieving only 1.5 to 2 miles per gallon on a route on which a PD-4103 could easily get 7 on cheaper #1 Diesel fuel. The Brills, however, were far more powerful, and much faster than the PD-4103s on the flat. The PD-4103 was the first GM Coach offered with an optional restroom, or with facilities for an optional food buffet, a feature used on many cars ordered by Trailways. The PD-4103 restroom was problematic, as the overhead for the refrigeration unit and engine air intake severely restricted headroom. This problem was rectified in the successor PD-4104, which set the pattern for bus restrooms for all manufacturers for the next 50 years.

A common piece of misinformation about the preceding PD-4102 model is that it had the same restyled front end as the later PD-4103 (and 1950 PD-3704) while retaining the old, transit style rear end of the PD-4101. This was given life due to a single (and often photographed) rebuilt PD-4101, owned by Colorado Southern/Burlington Trailways, that had suffered front end damage in a serious wreck. This single coach was rebuilt using a GM Truck and Coach-provided "kit" that gave it the PD-4103 front end. No such combination of PD-4101 rear end and PD-4103 front end was ever released by the GM Truck and Coach factory in Pontiac, MI. The reality was that the PD-4102 and PD-4103 models were virtually indistinguishable from each other except to the trained eye, which would look for the left side rear baggage door, or the exhaust fan grilles on the front interior of the latter model. On the front sides, there were two air exhaust "slots" on either side of the PD-4102, while the PD-4103 had five. In place of the exhaust fan grilles on the later model, the PD-4012 had a series of small holes punched into the sheet metal that made up the luggage rack soffit.

The PD-4103 itself was superseded by the radically new, monocoque-bodied PD-4104 in mid-1953, which eliminated the traditional longitudinal steel frame, had a much improved air conditioning system which used an underfloor evaporator in conjunction with the heater cores giving a "reheat" system providing excellent temperature control, had commodious luggage bays afforded by the elimination of the traditional frame, and an all-new air suspension system that used common parts with 1953 transit models. The PD-4104's ride and handling were far superior to that of the old steel sprung previous models, and paved the way for higher passenger and operator expectations all through the 1950s. The new PD-4104 also was wrapped in GM's version of Raymond Loewy's "Highway Traveler" concept bus, which also shared most styling features with the later PD-4501 Scenicruiser, another exclusive Greyhound Lines model. The PD-4104, although appearing to be completely new, actually was a heavy reworking of Greyhound Lines' previous PD-3751/PD-4151 models, as several structural members were identical. It also, for the first several months, used the same Continental/Ingersoll-Rand engine/refrigeration compressor assembly that dated all the way back to the "Silversides" during World War II. This would soon give way to higher capacity, more reliable Waukesha/Trane engine/compressor combination that was rated at a nominal six tons. Although the earliest PD-4104s were fairly adequate (certainly more adequate than the PD-4103) in terms of refrigeration capacity, the later PD-4104 could overcome even the hottest and most humid climes with ease. Greyhound Lines' second order of PD-4104s used Waukesha diesels to drive their air conditioning, an option reserved for them only, while later orders for Trailways retained the standard gasoline engine. The PD-4104 would be the last GM coach for any service that used a separate engine to provide refrigeration service.

Although made instantly obsolete by the new PD-4104 in 1953, the PD-4103 soldiered on in scheduled and charter service for another two decades, notably with Pacific Greyhound Lines in the San Francisco Bay area. Many were still used by small charter operators into the mid to late 1970s, such as Peninsula Charter Lines and Roesch Lines, both in California. Roesch, located in San Bernardino, California operated a former C&S/Trailways PD-4102 until 1976 as their fleet number 401, the last known PD-4102 in revenue service by that time.

The PD-4103 ate away at Brill highway coach sales due to the economy of operation of the much more efficient GM Diesel 6-71 engine. The many improved features and engineering of the PD-4104 and its modern, sleek appearance that matched its stablemate PD-4501 Scenicruiser, led ACF-Brill Corporation to exit the bus-building business in 1954. On the secondary market, PD-4103s released by both Greyhound Lines and Trailways quickly displaced contemporary Brill IC41 coaches due to their economy of operation alone, making the tertiary market prices on used IC41 Brills very low indeed.

== Specifications ==
- Length: 35 feet (11 m)
- Width: 96 inches (2.4 m)
- Height: 115 11/16 inches (2.938 m)
- GVWR: 30,000 pounds (14,000 kg)
- Front GAWR: 11,000 pounds (5,000 kg)
- Rear GAWR: 19,000 pounds (8,600 kg)
- Aisle Width: 15 1/4 inches (0.39 m)
- Wheelbase: 247 inches (6.3 m)
- Turning radius: 41 feet (12 m)
- Tire size: 11.00/20"
- Engine: Detroit Diesel 6-71LA39
- S.A.E. Horsepower: 43.35
- Advertised Horsepower: 190
- Governed Engine Speed: 2150 RPM
- Axle ratios (std): 4.10:1 (opt1) 3.875:1 (opt2) 3.56:1
- Top speed @ 2150 RPM: 65.2 MPH (std), 69.1 MPH (opt2), 75.1 MPH (Most Continental Trailways units were ordered with the 3.875:1 rear end; Greyhound used the std ratio except for Greyhound franchisee T.N.M.&.O., which ordered the special 3.56:1 on their PD-4103s)
- Transmission: Spicer/GM Manual, 4-speed with equally spaced "road" gearing. Transit-type "close three, long direct" gearing not an option.
- Seats: 16 or 18 double reclining seats, 5 rear lounge seat total 37 or 41 seats.
- Door Width: 24 inches (0.61 m)
- Popular major options: Air conditioning, facilities for removable restroom or buffet by removing part of the rear lounge seat on the right side, 22.5" rims and bright siding delete.
- Popular minor options: (shared with PD-4102) Choice of either GM/Guide "arrow" directional/brake lamps (std) or GE colored glass sealed beam lamps (std on early PD-4104); driver's GMC-branded spotlight; choice of long transit-style rear view side mirrors (std) or front end mounded round ("lollypop") style mirrors; options for partial non-opening side windows when air conditioning ordered. optional front window bug screens on all models. (Greyhound usually ordered the standard lamp and mirror items, while Trailways opted for the optional mirrors and sealed beams, as well as the front window bug screens. Trailways also opted for the driver's side spotlight on most orders, as they did on the PD-4104.)

== See also ==
- PD-4501 Scenicruiser
- GM Buffalo bus

== Notes ==
- Bluehoundsandredhounds.info. The History of Greyhound and Trailways Retrieved 19 July 2012.
