= GM Buffalo bus =

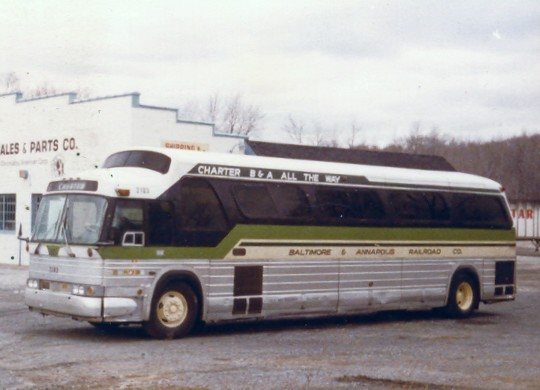
- Baltimore and Annapolis Railroad Company's motorcoach # 2103 is a 1969 GM Buffalo 40' model PD4903A with seating for 47 passengers, seen in Pitman, New Jersey, in 1983.

Overview
- Manufacturer: GM Truck and Coach Division (General Motors)
- Assembly: United States: Pontiac, Michigan (Pontiac West Assembly)

Body and chassis
- Doors: 1 or 2
- Floor type: Step entrance

Powertrain
- Engine: GM 8V-71 Detroit Diesel
- Transmission: Spicer 4-speed manual; Allison 3-speed automatic

Dimensions
- Wheelbase: 261 in (6.6 m) (41xx); 318 1/2 in (8.09 m) (49xx)
- Length: 35 ft (11 m) (41xx); 39 ft 11 in (12.17 m) (49xx)
- Width: 95 3/4 in (2.43 m)
- Height: 131 1/2 in (3.34 m)

The GM "Buffalo" bus is a colloquial term referring to several models of intercity motorcoaches built by the GM Truck and Coach Division at Pontiac, Michigan, between 1966 and 1980. "Buffalo" coaches have a stepped roof in front, and the first three rows of seats are at different levels, mounted on stepped floors resembling some types of theater seating.

== History ==
=== Predecessors ===
==== Scenicruiser ====
The GM "Buffalo" bus models were strongly influenced by the PD-4501 Scenicruiser, a model GM manufactured exclusively for Greyhound Lines between 1954 and 1956.

The Scenicruiser was a parlor bus intended for long-distance service with two levels: a lower level at the front containing the driving console and ten seats behind it, and an upper level containing seating for 33. This allowed for a huge baggage compartment beneath the raised upper level, and also provided a 360-degree view for upper level passengers. A lavatory was located at the rear of the first level. Scenicruisers were equipped with air-ride suspension which utilized an air bag at each wheel, and were air-conditioned.

==== GM parlor buses ====
Contemporaneous with the Greyhound-exclusive Scenicruisers, GM manufactured the single-deck "Highway Traveler" (PD-4104) parlor from 1953 to 1960, pioneering the monocoque structure, air suspension, and slanted side windows that would go on to be used on the well-known New Look transit buses. Later, an updated Traveler (internally designated as model PD-4106 at GM, built 1961–65) incorporated some design updates, including the air-conditioning unit drive (now powered from an engine-mounted compressor), a V-drive engine–transmission connection, and the Detroit Diesel 6V71 or 8V71 engine.

==== Fishbowl transit and suburbans ====
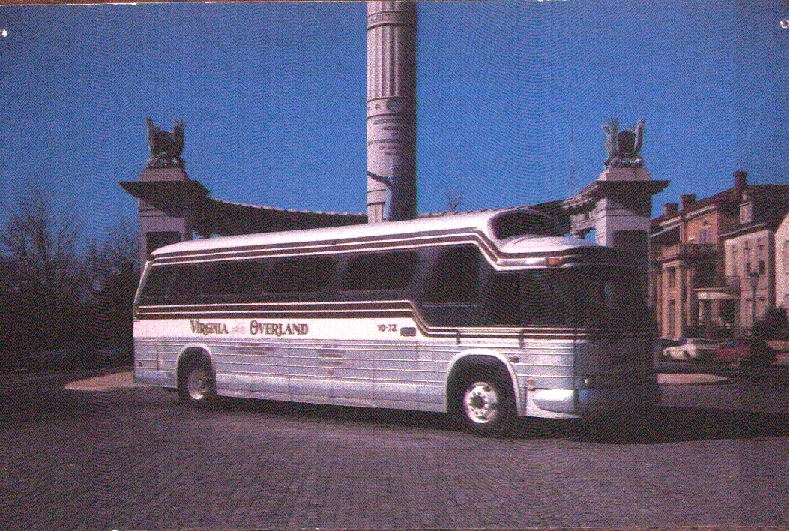
Virginia Overland Transportation's motorcoach # VO-72 is a 1972 GM Buffalo 35' model P8M4108A with seating for 39 passengers, seen at the Jefferson Davis Memorial on Monument Avenue in Richmond, Virginia, in 1982.

The GM New Look Transit Coach series (nicknamed "fishbowl" for the six-piece rounded windshield) was introduced in 1959. Beginning in the early 1960s, thousands were built in the transit and suburban bus models. When designed and put into production, the Buffalo intercity products shared many body and mechanical parts with these "fishbowl" buses, which were assembled in the same plant in Pontiac, Michigan.

This aspect, a sensible production economy at first, would have a negative impact on the future of the Buffalo models years later when GM switched transit production at the Pontiac plant to the modular RTS design, a radical change beginning in the late 1970s.

=== Buffalo development ===
As Scenicruisers became a familiar sight on roads around the United States and in advertisements, competing bus companies including members of the National Trailways Bus System sought a vehicle to compete with it. One of the product designs developed in response to this market demand was the GM "Buffalo" bus, nick-named for the hump-back style of the roofline. Many features such as the split-level design from the Scenicruiser and the revisions introduced in the PD-4106 model were included in the Buffalo bus.

Unlike the Scenicruiser, the Buffalo buses were available for sale to all operators. In fact, Greyhound eventually purchased a few of them; the last GM bus purchased by Greyhound was a 1967 PD-4107.

== Models ==
Type	Engine	Transmission (2nd gen only)		Nominal seating capacity and length	Series	Air conditioning
1st generation P = parlor bus	1st generation D = diesel	1st generation Not used	-	41 = 35 feet (10.7 m); 49 = 40 feet (12.2 m)	two digits	A = Air conditioning
2nd generation H = highway coach	2nd generation 8 = Detroit Diesel 8V71	H = hydraulic (automatic) transmission M = manual transmission	-	41 = 35 feet (10.7 m); 49 = 40 feet (12.2 m)	two digits	A = Air conditioning

=== First generation: GM PD-4107 and PD-4903 ===
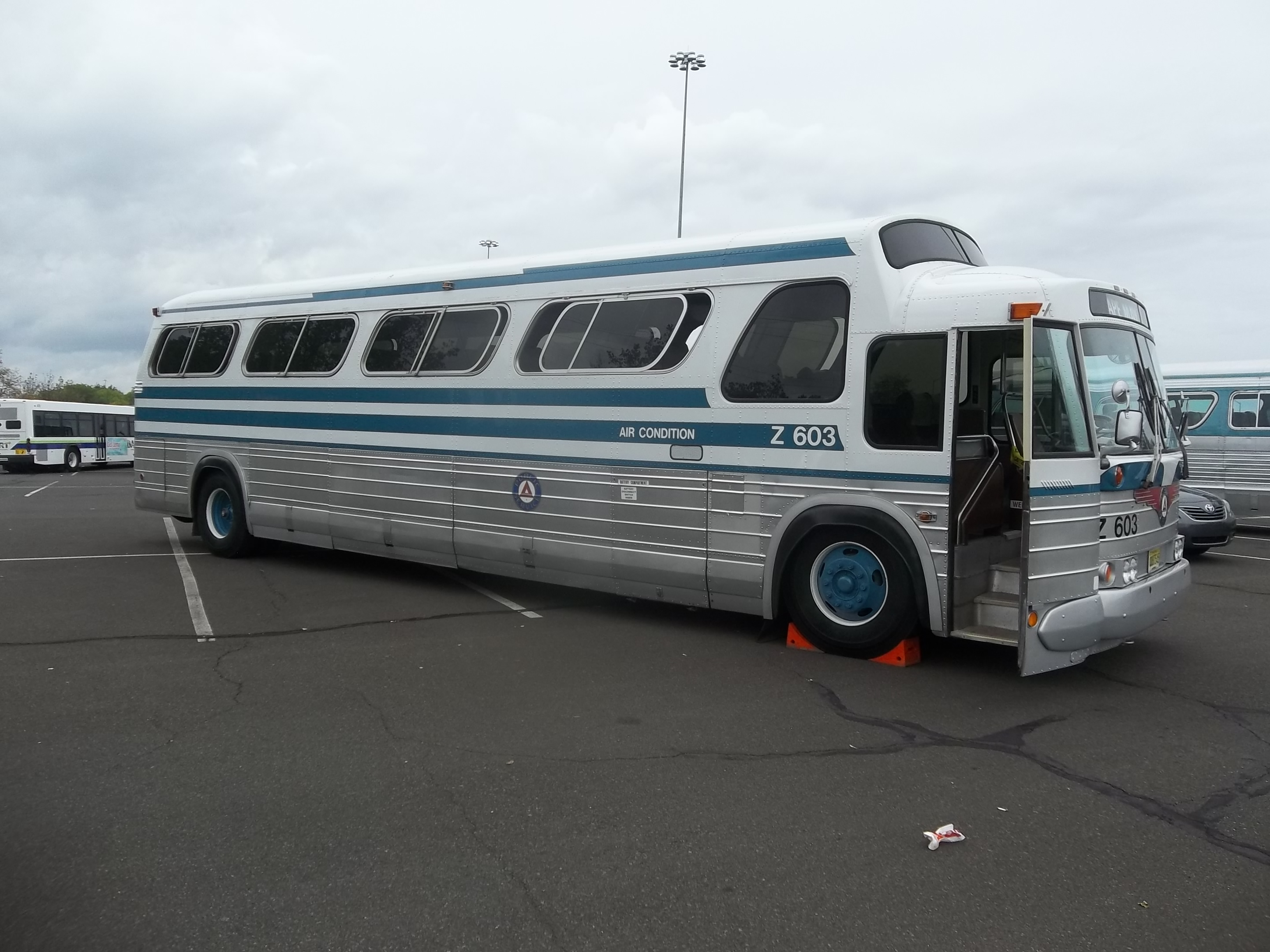
PD-4903 with open door, formerly Public Service Coordinated Transport Z603

In 1966, GM introduced the PD-4107. Also known informally as "decks," these buses were similar in some ways to the Scenicruiser design, but had a larger "second level" with the first level reduced, and the lavatory was located at the rear. The 4107 was 35-foot (11 m) in length, and nominally (without lavatory) would seat 41 passengers (38 or 39 with lavatory). In 1968, the PD-4903 was introduced, a 40-foot (12 m) long version of the 4107 which nominally would seat 49 passengers (46 or 47 with lavatory). The PD-4903 was the first GM bus to use a 24 volt electrical system and was equipped with a third luggage bay.

In the "Buffalo" bus, the driver sat higher than in the Scenicruiser, but the passenger compartment was no higher than the Scenicruiser's upper deck, so the Buffalo was not actually a double decker. The difference in the height of the front and rear roof was approximately one foot, giving a sleeker, more aerodynamic shape.

These product lines used an airplane-like stressed-skin construction in which an aluminum riveted skin supports the weight of the bus, while a rigid wooden floor platform kept the bus's structural shape. The engine cradle was hung off the back framing of the roof.

GM's Buffalo models were powered by turbocharged eight-cylinder Detroit Diesel Series 71 two-cycle diesel engines, known as the 8V71N. GM buses used a unique "V-drive" configuration with a transverse-mounted engine. The transmission was set off at a 63° angle to connect to the rear axle. The left-hand rotating engines were canted backwards for maintenance access; in fact, the only major components not accessible from outside the bus were the right-hand exhaust manifold and the starter, which were accessible from underneath and via access panels under the rear passenger seat. The entire engine–transmission–radiator assembly was mounted on a cradle which could quickly be removed and replaced for maintenance, allowing the bus to rapidly return to revenue service while leaving the powertrain in the shop for repairs.

The original buses had a four-speed non-synchronized Spicer manual transmission with a solenoid reverse. The 4107 and 4903 models were notorious for being difficult to shift through the gears, often making loud, grinding noises that tended to upset the passengers. The technique known as "double-clutching" reduced these noises, but even the most skilled driver would occasionally have problems, especially when changing buses gave the driver an unfamiliar clutching or shifting feel.

=== Second generation: GM PD-4108 and PD-4905 ===
In 1970, design improvements came with the updated versions, PD-4108 (35 ft) and PD-4905 (40 ft) both with a 24-volt electrical system. The driver's controls were updated for both. The biggest complaint about the 4905 and 4903, from the drivers' point of view, was that the extra 5 feet (1.5 m) of length was all between the front and rear axles. The baggage compartment doors could easily be scraped during tight turns. The 4905s looked just like 4108s but with three baggage compartments. In addition, synchronized gearboxes were added in the second generation.

Some 4905s were equipped with a tag axle at the factory, with a single extra wheel on each side, located in the third baggage compartment for states with lower axle load limits. The tag axle was forward of the drive axle, so turning radius was not affected.

In 1972, the PD-4108 was redesignated P8M4108A, and the PD-4905 became P8M4905A. In 1979 and 1980, the P8M4905A was replaced with the short-lived model H8H649, which added an automatic transmission from Allison for the first time.

== Markets ==
The GM Buffalo models were purchased primarily by affiliates of the National Trailways Bus System and many other smaller operators. After the Scenicruiser exclusivity arrangement with GM, Greyhound purchased an interest in Canadian bus manufacturer Motor Coach Industries (MCI), and by the mid-1960s, it had switched most of its purchasing over to MCI products. In the 1970s, MCI products began to overtake the GM Buffalo models in sales volume, especially after the introduction of the popular MC-8 at the Transpo 72 exhibition held at Dulles Airport near Washington, DC, in 1972.

As the market share declined, GM lost interest in updating its intercity motorcoach products. When the GM RTS bus models replaced the fishbowl models in GM's transit bus offerings in 1977, the loss of shared capacity meant the Buffalo models, which shared many common parts with the fishbowl, would not continue in production for long. The final Buffalo model buses were built in 1980.

Total production of the 4,558 Buffalo buses was as follows:

GM "Buffalo" bus model and production history
Gen	Years	35-ft		40-ft	
Gen	Years	Model	Quantity	Model	Quantity
1	1966–69	PD-4107	1,267	PD-4903	401
2	1970–71	PD-4108	68	PD-4905	330
2	1972–78/79 (Note: 35' (P8M-4108A) manufactured until 1979. 40' (P8M-4905A) manufactured until 1978.)	P8M-4108A	232	P8M-4905A	2,027
2	1979–80	N/A		H8H-649A	233
Totals		1,567		2,991	

== See also ==
- GM PD-4501 Scenicruiser
- GM New Look Transit Coach
- Rapid Transit Series - next transit generation bus
- GMC Classic bus
- GM PD-4103
- List of buses
