= GX-2 =

Prototype bus built for Greyhound Lines

Greyhound GX-2

Overview
- Manufacturer: GMC
- Production: 1 unit
- Model years: 1947-1949
- Assembly: GMC Truck and Coach Division, Pontiac, Michigan
- Designer: Albert Boca

Body and chassis
- Class: Tri-axle coach
- Body style: Single-decker (Split level) coach
- Doors: 1 door, front
- Floor type: High-floor

Powertrain
- Engine: 2x 7.0L (281 ci) GM 6-71 I6 Diesel; 7 L (426 cu in)
- Capacity: 10 on lower level, 33 on upper level. Total 43 seats
- Transmission: 1x 4-speed manual + 2-speed clutch

Dimensions
- Length: 12 m (40 ft)
- Width: 2 m (8 ft)
- Height: 3 m (11 ft)
- Curb weight: 11,839–15,642 kg (26,100–34,485 lb)

Chronology
- Predecessor: Greyhound GX-1
- Successor: PD-4501 Scenicruiser

The GX-2 (Greyhound Experimental #2 – The Scenicruiser) was a prototype bus built for Greyhound that was eventually developed into the Scenicruiser. It began in mid-1948 as a 35-foot design, but, in part to accommodate more passengers, Greyhound President Orville Caesar directed his engineering department to add five feet in length to the upper deck of a PD-3751 obtained from GM. After Greyhound's initial experiences with GX-1, a 50-seat double-decked bus, Caesar decided that the next prototype would be a deck-and-a-half style, which led to the silhouette of the Scenicruiser.

== Design ==
The design, introduced to Greyhound's executives in the fall of 1948, was "a coach with an observation dome following somewhat the general idea of the astrodome cars recently put in service by some of the railroads." Or, as Orville Caesar later summarized, "the observation dome model coach is basically a Silversides coach with a dome and the Model GX-1 front end added." Unlike GX-1, the design patent for GX-2 did not name Raymond Loewy. Albert Boca, the patent holder, was a GM designer. The design patent D160059, submitted and granted in 1950, was assigned to General Motors.

The GX-2 was built by Greyhound engineers and mechanics in the Chicago Greyhound Motors & Supply Company plant with the active cooperation of industrial designers Raymond Loewy Associates and General Motors' styling section. The final design was 40 feet long, eight feet wide and almost 11 feet tall. It weighed 26,100 lb unloaded and 34,485 loaded. Unlike the future Scenicruiser, the GX-2 had its driving wheels at the very back of the coach. The intermediate tag axle, also called the dead axle, differed in having two wheels instead of four later.

The bus seated ten on the lower deck and 33 on the top deck. One of its most striking design improvements was that the passengers in the rear compartment "are seated in a raised dome with a wide windshield curved around the entire forward section to give an unobstructed view of the road ahead." The six upper-level skylights provided illumination from the windshield to the rear, which had windows in the roof at the sides in a U-shaped configuration around the top back of the bus. A lounge with leather seats provided a table for playing cards. The new bus had many innovative features for the time, including a toilet and a PA system used by the driver to make announcements and to play tape-recorded music. It increased both heating and cooling temperatures automatically by four degrees when the headlights were turned on.

The engine was the GM Diesel 6-71 (426 cubic inches, 220 horsepower @ 2000 r.p.m.). Mounted transversally at the rear with three rubber mounts, it connected via angle drive to the rear axle through a 4-speed transmission. During the testing time, Greyhound added a two-speed clutch that had become part of the original PD-4501 in 1954. The diesel also drove the hydraulic fluid pump, the alternator and a cooling fan. The hydraulic system operated the steering gear, but unlike the 4501 to come it also worked the brakes and the six windshield wipers. The seven gallons of fluid were pumped at a rate of 11 gallons per minute and generated a maximum pressure of 1500 PSI, with 900 PSI the norm. The muffler was mounted behind the rear bumper and the radiator was on the left rear side.

After two to three years of testing, Greyhound and GM finalized the design of the Scenicruiser that would enter service in July 1954. GX-2 went into Greyhound service around 1952 with Great Lakes Greyhound Lines (GLGL), running as G-7483 until around 1957. It was leased to the Ralph Marterie Orchestra for several years, and then sold by Greyhound to Sterling Stages in Warren, Ohio, which used it as for charter, then sold it to the Blue Ridge Quartet. It then disappeared; the first of the iconic Scenicruisers, the only hand-built example, was most likely scrapped near Nashville, Tennessee.

== Testing ==
Greyhound, from the GX-1 testing, had determined the value of a dual-engine approach as well as air-leveling and shock absorption, so the focus for the GX-2 was on style and function, using a standard coach, and increasing its height and length. Constructed during 1948 and early 1949, it was revealed to the public on July 1, 1949, as the Greyhound Scenicruiser. It toured the country for testing and refinements, in addition to encouraging the remaining state legislatures to pass laws permitting 40-foot-long buses, during the following year. By June 1950, it had visited 46 states.
