= Panasonic Lumix DMC-GX8 =

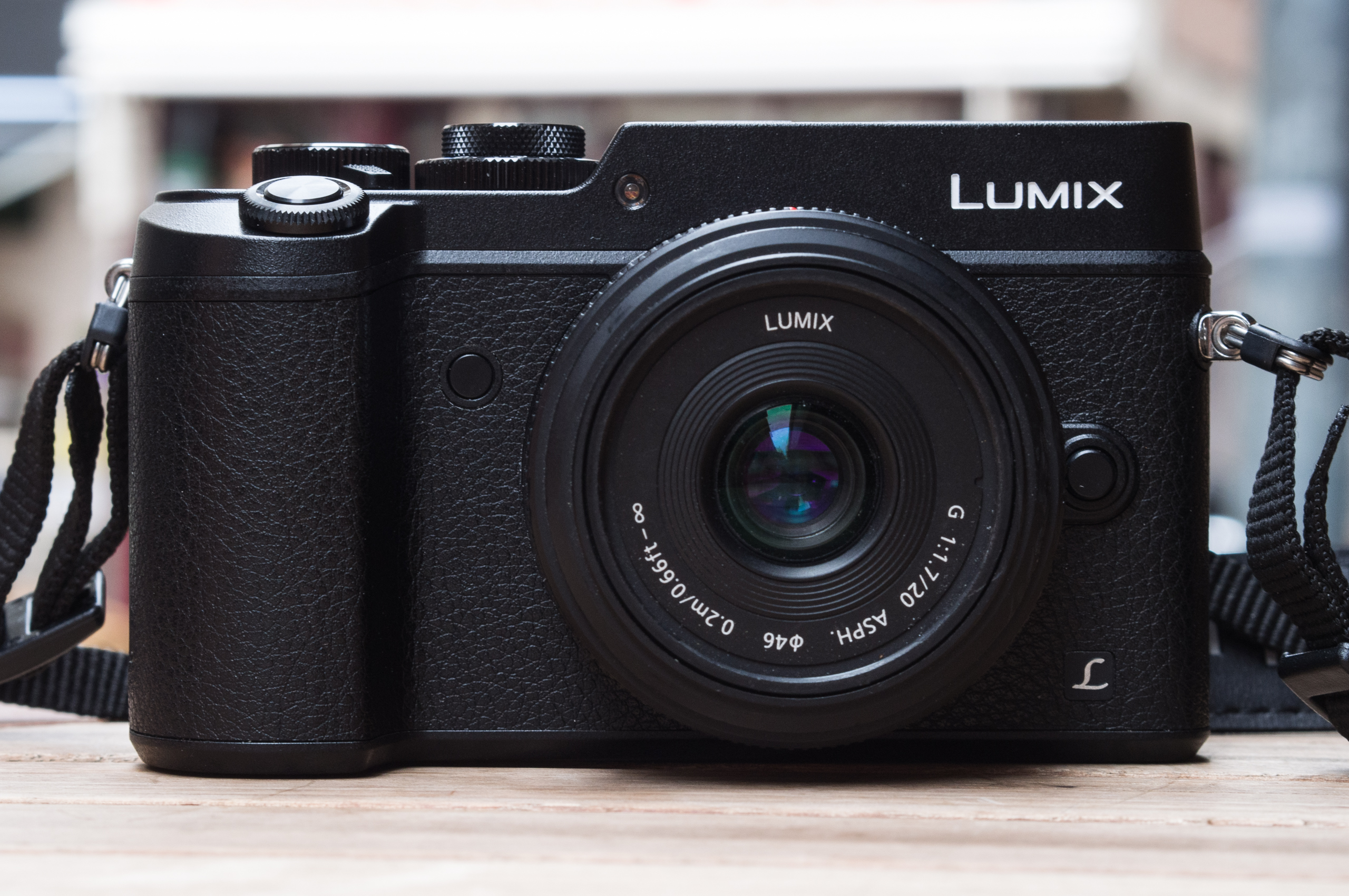

Overview
- Maker: Panasonic
- Released: July 2015

Lens
- Lens mount: Micro Four Thirds

Sensor/medium
- Sensor type: CMOS
- Sensor size: 17.3 × 13 mm (Four Thirds type)
- Maximum resolution: 5184 × 3888 (20 megapixels)
- Film speed: 200–25600 (100 expanded)
- Recording medium: SD, SDHC or SDXC memory card

Focusing
- Focus areas: 49 focus points

Shutter
- Shutter speeds: 1/16000 s to 60 s
- Continuous shooting: 12 frames per second

Viewfinder
- Viewfinder magnification: 1.54
- Frame coverage: 100%

Image processing
- Image processor: Venus Engine
- White balance: Yes

General
- LCD screen: 3" with 1.04M dots
- Dimensions: 133 × 78 × 63 mm (5.24 × 3.07 × 2.48 inches)
- Weight: 487 g (17 oz) including battery

Chronology
- Predecessor: Panasonic Lumix DMC-GX7
- Successor: Panasonic Lumix DC-GX9

The Panasonic Lumix DMC-GX8 is a digital rangefinder-styled mirrorless interchangeable-lens camera announced by Panasonic on July 16, 2015. The camera features a newly developed 20 megapixel sensor - previously the highest resolution in Micro Four Thirds cameras was 16 megapixels. The camera's ISO range touches 25600 and it can capture continuous frames at up to 8 frames per second. One major new feature introduced in the camera is "Dual IS", the camera 5 axis image stabilisation gets synchronised, when available, with lens based image stabilisation. The camera also records 4K video, but with addition crop around 1.6x.

The manufacturer has indicated the time to acquire auto focus as 0.07 seconds. The electronic OLED viewfinder has a resolution of 2.36 million dots and, as in the predecessor, is tiltable. The 3-inch (76 mm) OLED touchscreen rear display is fully articulated and can display 1.04 million dots. The camera is splash proof.

A smaller version of the GX8, the Panasonic GX80 (retailed as the GX85 in the United States and as the GX7 Mark II in Japan) was announced on April 4, 2016. The camera features many of the same features of the Panasonic GX8 camera but utilises a 16 megapixel sensor instead of the 20 megapixel sensor of the GX8. The Panasonic GX80/GX85 became the first Panasonic Micro Four Thirds camera to do without a low-pass filter. According to the claim made by Panasonic, the Panasonic GX80/GX85 will have 10% more fine detail resolving power than cameras with a similar sensor which do include a low pass filter.

== Gallery ==
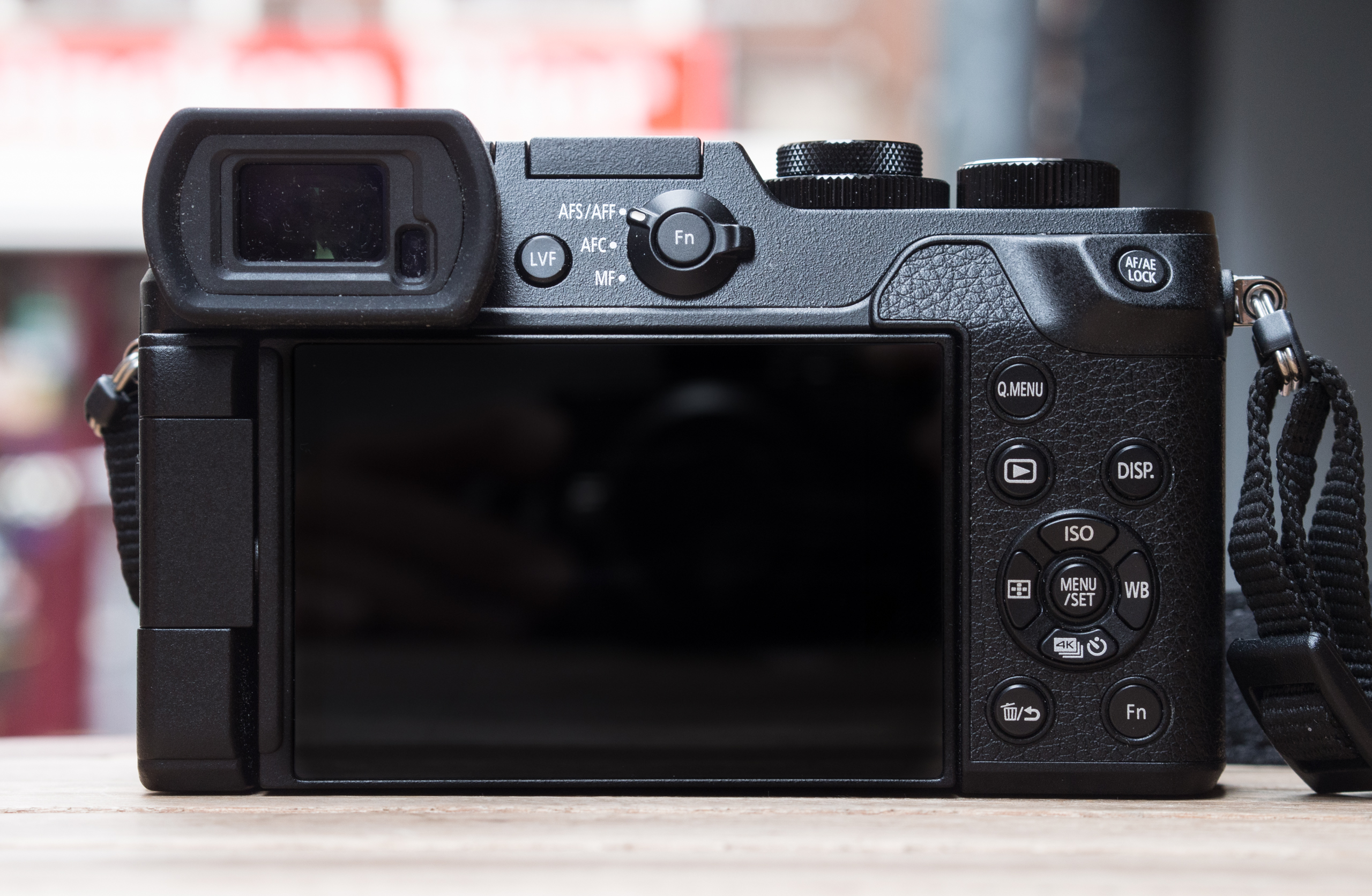

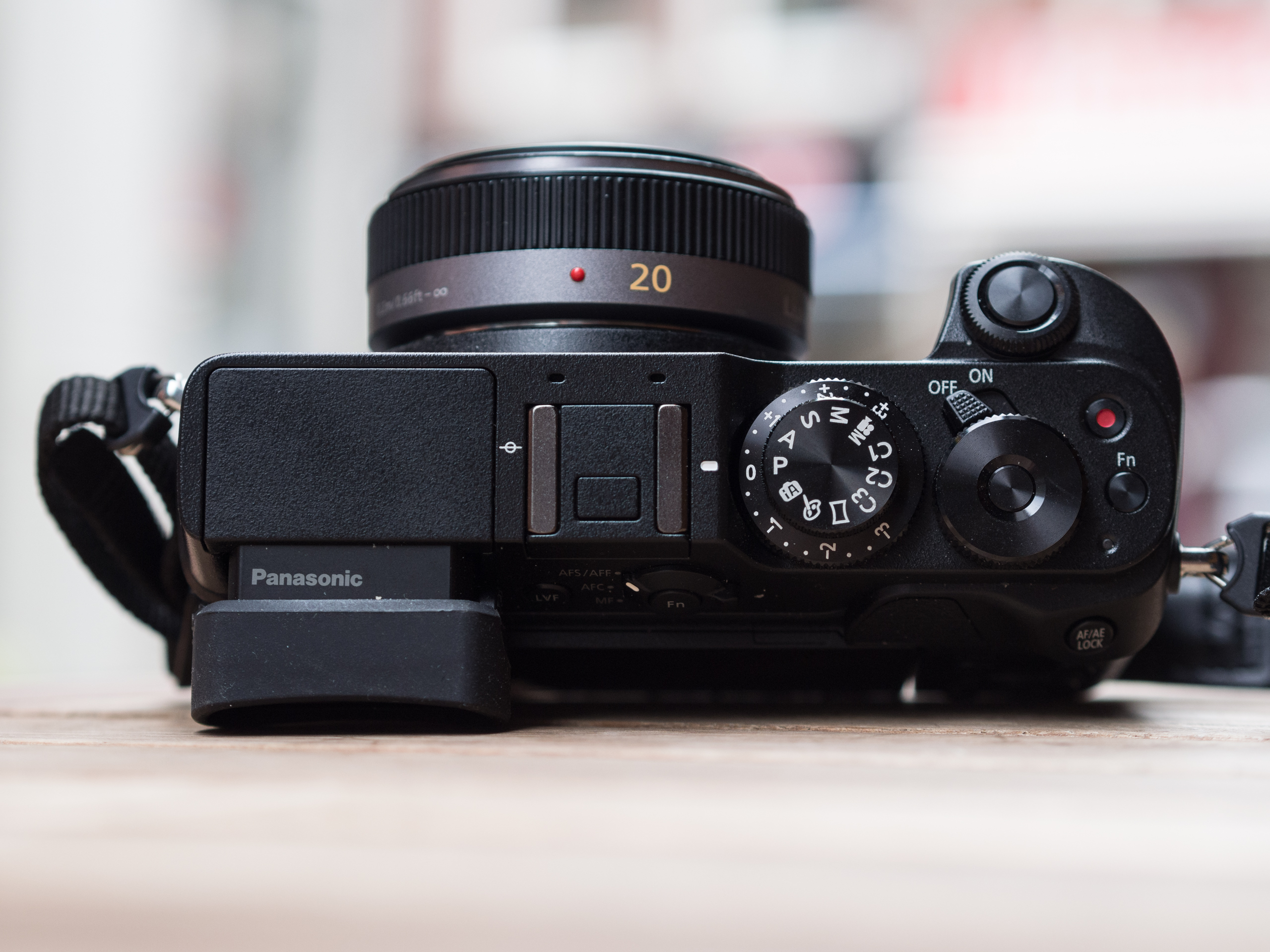

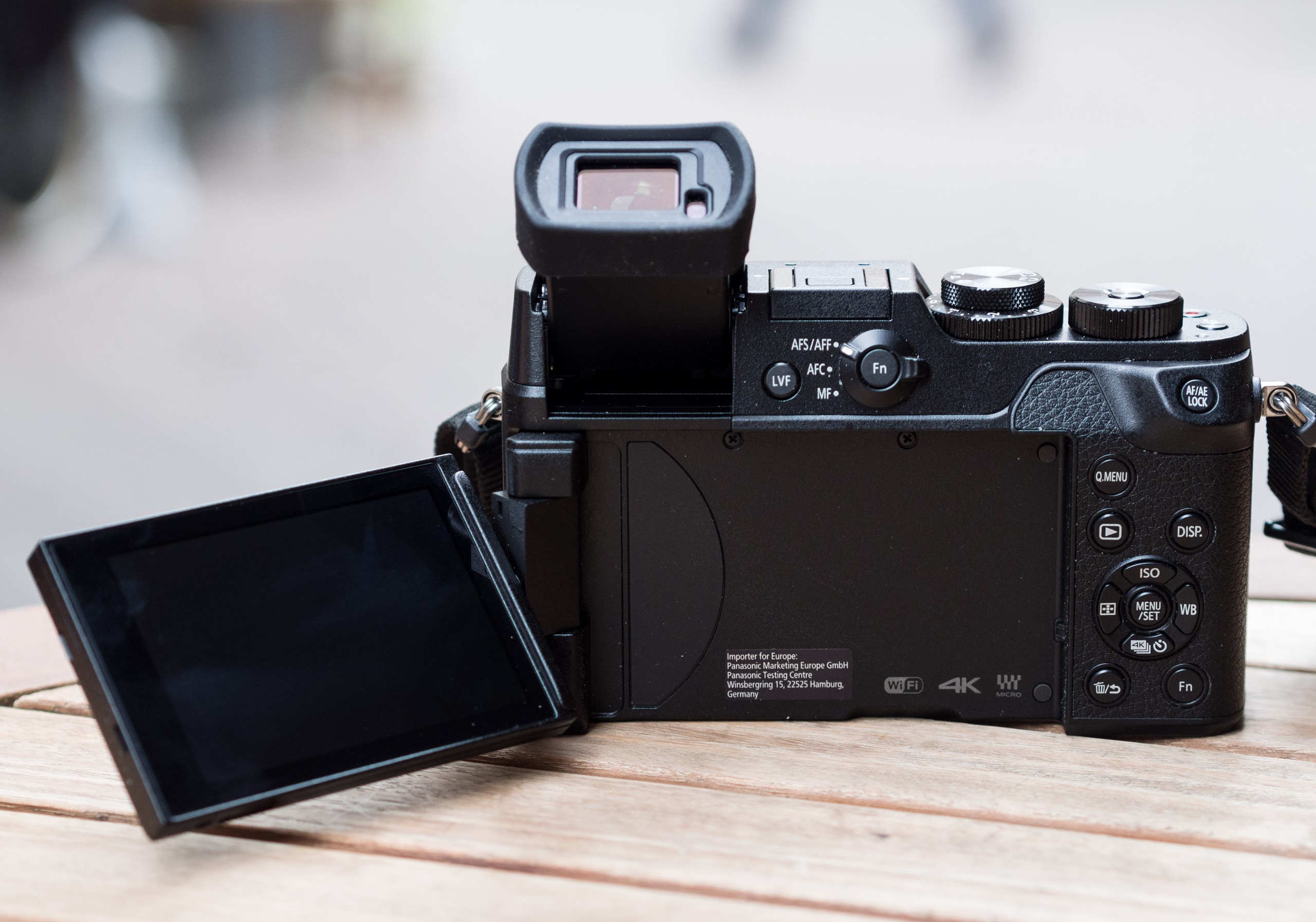

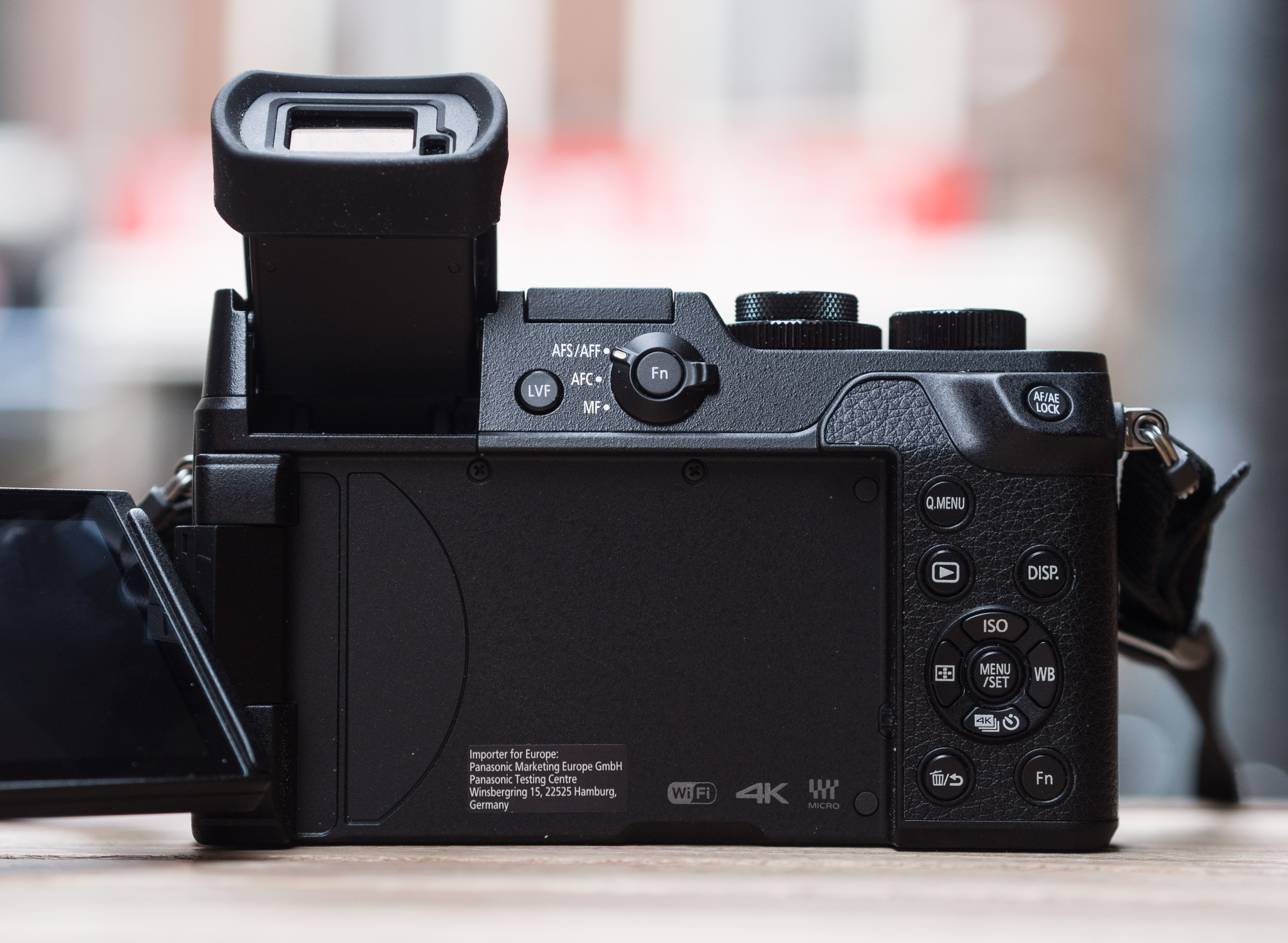

Preceded by Panasonic Lumix DMC-GX7	Panasonic Micro Four Thirds System cameras August 2015–present	Succeeded by Panasonic Lumix DC-GX9

Brand	Form	Class	2008	2009	2010	2011			2012	2013	2014	2015	2016	2017	2018	2019	2020	2021	2022	2023	2024	25
Olympus	SLR style OM-D	Professional															E-M1X ^{R}					
Olympus	SLR style OM-D	High-end									E-M1			E-M1 II ^{R}			E-M1 III ^{R}					
Olympus	SLR style OM-D	Advanced							E-M5			E-M5 II ^{R}					E-M5 III ^{R}					
Olympus	SLR style OM-D	Mid-range									E-M10		E-M10 II		E-M10 III			E-M10 IV				
Olympus	Rangefinder style PEN	Mid-range		E-P1	E-P2		E-P3				E-P5		PEN-F ^{R}									
Olympus	Rangefinder style PEN	Upper-entry			E-PL1	E-PL2		E-PL3	E-PL5		E-PL6	E-PL7		E-PL8	E-PL9		E-PL10					
Olympus	Rangefinder style PEN	Entry-level					E-PM1		E-PM2													
Olympus	remote													Air								
OM System	SLR style	Professional																	OM-1 ^{R}		OM-1 II ^{R}	
OM System	SLR style	High-end																				OM-3 ^{R}
OM System	SLR style	Advanced																		OM-5 ^{R}		
OM System	PEN	Mid-range																	E-P7			
Panasonic	SLR style	High-end Video													GH5S				GH6 ^{R}			GH7 ^{R}
Panasonic	SLR style	High-end Photo													G9 ^{R}						G9 II ^{R}	
Panasonic	SLR style	High-end		GH1		GH2			GH3		GH4				GH5				GH5II			
Panasonic	SLR style	Mid-range		G1	G2		G3		G5		G6		G7	G80/G85			G90/G95					
Panasonic	SLR style	Entry-level			G10													G100			G100D	
Panasonic	Rangefinder style	Advanced							GX1		GX7		GX8		GX9							
Panasonic	Rangefinder style	Mid-range									GM1	GM5	GX80/GX85									
Panasonic	Rangefinder style	Entry-level			GF1	GF2	GF3		GF5		GF6	GF7	GF8	GX800/GX850/GF9		GX880/GF10/GF90						
Panasonic	Camcorder	Professional							AG-AF104													
Kodak	Rangefinder style	Entry-level										S-1										
DJI	Drone	.												Zenmuse X5S								
DJI	Drone	.												Zenmuse X5								
YI	Rangefinder style	Entry-level												M1								
Yongnuo	Rangefinder style	Android camera															YN450M		YN455			
Blackmagic Design	Rangefinder style	High-End Video							Cinema Camera													
Blackmagic Design	Rangefinder style	High-End Video									Pocket Cinema Camera					Pocket Cinema Camera 4K						
Blackmagic Design		High-End Video										Micro Cinema Camera									Micro Studio Camera 4K G2	
Z CAM	Cinema	Advanced											E1			E2						
Z CAM	Cinema	Mid-Range																E2-M4				
Z CAM	Cinema	Entry-Level															E2C					
JVC	Camcorder	Professional										GY-LS300										
SVS-Vistek		Industrial							EVO Tracer													
