= GX-1 (bus) =

Concept bus by Greyhound

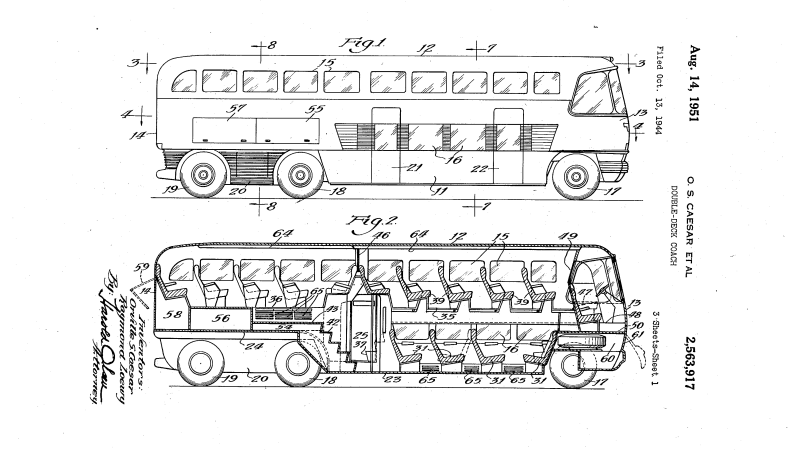

Overview
- Manufacturer: GMC
- Production: 1 unit
- Model years: 1948
- Assembly: GMC Truck and Coach Division, Pontiac, Michigan
- Designer: Raymond Loewy

Body and chassis
- Class: Tri-axle coach
- Body style: Double-decker bus
- Doors: 1 door, front, curb side
- Floor type: High-floor

Powertrain
- Engine: 2x Franklin 335 (6A4-150) I6, air-cooled rated at 150 HP each
- Capacity: 13 on lower level (sedan lounge); 31 on upper level (Terrace Lounge); 6 on upper level (Fore Lounge); Total 50 seats

Dimensions
- Length: 11 m (35 ft)
- Width: 2 m (8 ft)
- Height: 3 m (11 ft)
- Curb weight: 11,839–15,642 kg (26,100–34,485 lb)

Chronology
- Successor: GX-2

GX-1 (Greyhound Experimental #1 – The Highway Traveler) was the first post-WWII concept bus from Greyhound that evolved into the Scenicruiser PD-4501.

== History ==
Known as the “Greyhound Experimental #1” or GX-1, Orville Caesar's postwar bus was designed by him and by Raymond Loewy, a multi-year activity beginning in the mid- to late-1930s. The “blue-sky sketches” of Loewy gave form and function to the many ideas seen in Caesar's earlier patents that fit with his convictions of what the travelling public would want and what an intercity transportation company would need.

A full-size mock-up with three levels was built in the early 1940s. It was studied and refined throughout the years of World War II, but nothing could be built during that period because of the war effort. The first public mention of what would become GX-1 was August 1944 when Greyhound let two contracts for new buses, one with Consolidated Vultee, the other with General Motors. The design had been refined to two levels and tandem rear axles. The original plan was to build six GX-1s, three powered by air-cooled aircraft engines and the others by diesel.

There was little or no publicity thereafter for two years. About mid-1945, if not sooner, Consolidated Vultee abandoned the project; it is not known what General Motors did with their activity. Greyhound began building their own version of GX-1 at the Greyhound Motors & Supply Company in Chicago. A year later, in August 1946, the double-decker bus was “just around the corner,” according to one article.

By mid-April of the 1946, Time magazine reported Caesar's hoping that road tests would begin in the summer of 1947. Greyhound found ways to reduce overall weight and the design changed to a single rear axle. But it would be almost another year, when, on March 19, 1948, the GX-1 began its shakedown tests in Chicago and was revealed to the public at the opening of the new Greyhound station in Cleveland in April 1948 as “The Highway Traveler.” Existing home movies of GX-1 on the road date from probably the summer of 1948.

In April 1948, Greyhound was telling the press that the new bus "... will soon be put into regular passenger service following its tests." As late as September 1948 articles were still promoting and anticipating GX-1. Even Greyhound's chief engineer, Milo Dean, was giving talks on the “new” coach in early 1949. But then nothing further was heard until the annual report for 1948, which appeared March 10, 1949. This revealed both that GX-1 had been undergoing thorough tests, and that Greyhound was now building a GX-2, based on what it had learned.

== Overview ==
GX-1 was a double-decker, semi-monoque design, seating 50 passengers. At about 11 feet tall and 35 feet long, it was divided into three compartments: the lower-level Sedan Lounge, seating 13; the upper-level Terrace Lounge, seating 31; and the upper-level Fore Lounge, seating 6. Entering at the curb side door, one could proceed to the Sedan Lounge seating, take an immediate left to stairs to the Terrace Lounge, or take a right to stairs leading to the Fore Lounge. The Sedan Lounge also held a washroom, a drinking fountain and a refrigerated cabinet.

The power train was a unique design, using two Franklin 335 (6A4-150) engines, which is considered the first use of aircooled engines for commercial highway passenger transportation. The twin air-cooled 6-Cylinder engines are rated at 150 HP each, installed at the rear of the bus.”

Another innovative design was the suspension. Designed by Greyhound chief engineer, Milo Dean, with two others from GM, Nils Thunstrom and Norman Martin, the GX-1 used compressed air in cylinders rather than the bellowed beams that came later. It was a natural progression from the concept of a hydraulic shock absorber to air suspension while using the “container” characteristic of most shock absorbers. However, this early invention incorporated the key design element that remained with the system that the Scenicruiser used: the amount and pressure of air was varied for selective purposes.

=== Features ===
- Restroom and water decrease running time between stops, thus attracting new customers
- One engine runs vehicle, while other runs accessories: air conditioning, air compressor for springs, generators, hydraulic power
  - On hills, accessory engine kicks in automatically to assist running the coach
  - If one engine fails, other runs vehicle and essential accessories
  - Suspended in rubber, either or both engines may be removed and replaced to get bus in service sooner
- Semi-monocoque design to eliminate chassis and extra weight, plus many other alloys and weight reduction techniques such as air-cooled aluminum engines, in order to have 50 passengers on two axles without exceeding axle weight limits
- Highly reflective 3M Scotchlite material outlines the coach for visibility by others at night
- Automatic steering gear control, preventing deflection of the path when a tire hits anything
- Hydrotarder to maintain constant speed downhill without the use of brakes
- Safety - passengers are seated either above impact level or between luggage compartments and aisles
- Tires, high-strength steel wire cords and another with nylon cords - both virtually blow-out proof
- Safety – puncture-proof, crash-proof gasoline tank built by Firestone Tire & Rubber, made of nylon plies and wire glass

== Transition to GX-2 ==
On July 1, 1949, Greyhound Experimental #2, or GX-2, significantly different in appearance, made its debut, and GX-1 virtually disappeared from public mention or view. It did not go into service and Greyhound probably scrapped it in the mid-1950s. However, at least ten of its design features were included in the 1954 Greyhound Scenicruiser, PD-4501:

1. Dual 150-horsepower engines. However, the six-cylinder air-cooled gasoline were replaced by four-cylinder water-cooled diesel engines
  1. Under normal conditions, one engine ran the bus, the other the accessories
  2. When and where extra power was necessary, the second engine kicked in and helped move the bus [however, the 4501 with its fluid couplings, provided continuous additional power]
  3. In case of engine failure, either remaining engine could propel the bus and run essential accessories
  4. Both engines were readily removable and replaceable for less down-time in the garage
2. Air suspension was used, and the level of the bus was maintained at a constant height regardless of load
3. Structural parts of the body framing served as air ducts for heating and cooling
4. Washroom and toilet on board
5. Double-paned safety glass windows with glare resistance
6. Public-address system
