= PD-4501 Scenicruiser =

American passenger coach

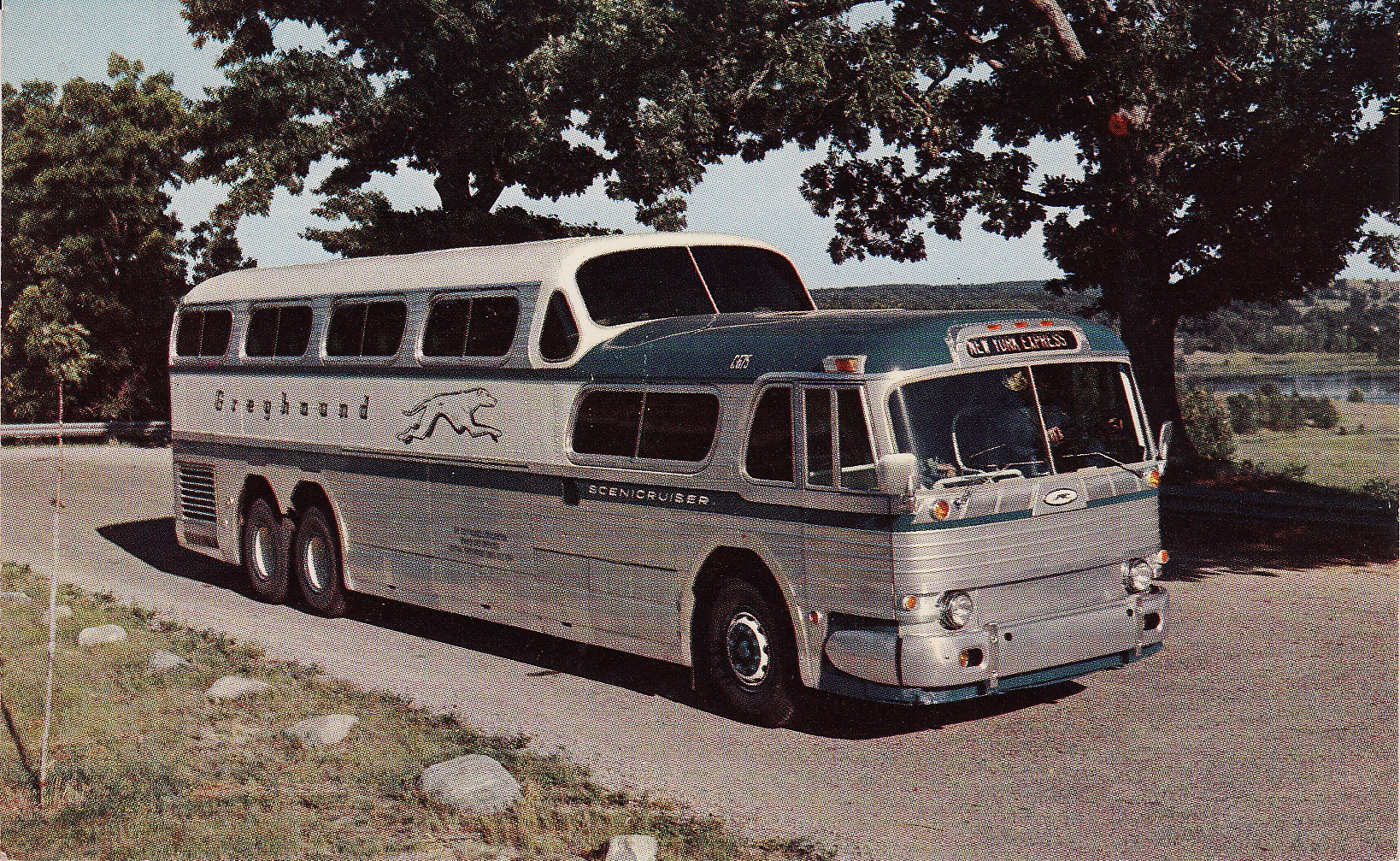
- 1950s postcard of a Scenicruiser

Overview
- Manufacturer: GMC
- Production: 1,001 units
- Assembly: GMC Truck and Coach Division, Pontiac, Michigan

Body and chassis
- Class: Tri-axle coach
- Body style: Single-decker (Split level) coach
- Doors: 1 door, front
- Floor type: High-floor

Powertrain
- Engine: Two 4.7L (284 ci) GM 4-71 I4 Diesel (1954-1960); 9.3L (568 ci) GM 8V-71 Diesel V8 (after 1961)
- Capacity: 10 on lower level, 33 on upper level. Total 43 seats
- Transmission: One 3-speed manual + 2-speed clutch (1954-1962); 4-speed manual (starting in 1961)

Dimensions
- Length: 40 feet (12.19 m)
- Width: 8 feet (2.44 m)
- Height: 11.166 feet (3.40 m)

Chronology
- Predecessor: GX-2
- Successor: GM Buffalo bus

The GMC PD-4501 Scenicruiser, manufactured by General Motors (GM) for Greyhound Lines, Inc., was a three-axle monocoque two-level coach that Greyhound used from July 1954 into the mid-1970s. 1001 were made between 1954 and 1956.

The Scenicruiser became an icon of the American way of life due to its presence throughout the United States in cities and along highways and popularity with the traveling public. The name was a portmanteau of the words "scenic" and "cruiser".

The high-level design concept of Scenicruiser resembles some of the rolling stock of the passenger-carrying railroads of the United States and Canada, particularly their popular stainless steel dome cars. This type of two-level motorcoach body was common in the late 1940s in Western Europe, including Great Britain, where it was known as Observation coach.

The concept of two-level monocoque body had been used earlier in the Spanish Pegaso Z-403 two-axle coach, designed in 1949 and entered production in 1951.

== Overview ==
The Model PD-4501, as GMC called it, was the most distinctive American parlor bus design of the modern era. It was the result of seven years of effort by Greyhound and GM Truck and Coach Division. The first GX-1 prototype was based on a design by Raymond Loewy as U.S. patent 2,563,917. Originally conceived as a 35-foot (10.67 m) bus, Greyhound later used a tandem-axle 40-foot (12.19 m) prototype by Loewy called the GX-2 to lobby for the lifting of length restrictions of buses longer than 35 feet in most states at the time.

=== Prototypes ===
The first design prototype for the Scenicruiser, the GX-1, was a double decker with access from the lower deck and the driver seated on the upper deck. It was soon decided that a split-level design would be better because the GX-1 was too tall for many Greyhound garages and lacked luggage space for 50 people. The GX-2 had a lower level containing the driver's area and entrance with ten seats plus a restroom on the passenger's side and an upper level with 33 more seats. This arrangement also allowed a large baggage compartment underneath the second level. This design was called the GX-2. Both the GX-1 and GX-2 were actually built by Greyhound from 1947 to 1949 with help from GMC. In late 1951, GMC started work on its first prototype, called the EXP 331. It was completed in 1954 and had some unique features that were not used on the production versions. After the last PD 4501 prototype was built, it was rebuilt as a production model with serial number PD 4501-1001.

=== Production Model ===
The Scenicruiser was equipped with air-ride suspension and air conditioning. The coaches were unusual in having ten wheels. Each of the two rear axles had four wheels but only the forward axle was powered.

Power for the production models was originally provided by a pair of GM Diesel 4-71 four cylinder engines of 160 HP each connected by a fluid coupling and arranged side by side in a shallow V formation. Two engines were necessary because GM had not yet built a V8 version of its Series 71 Diesel engine. Each coach had a single three-speed transmission with a manual two-speed clutch for six forward speeds. There were some problems when the coaches were new because all of Greyhound's other models had four-speed manual transmissions that shifted differently than those in the Scenicruiser. This meant additional training for drivers, who mostly disliked the new system. This installation proved to be less than successful, and the 979 buses remaining in 1961-62 were rebuilt with 8V-71 engines and four-speed manual Spicer transmissions by the Marmon-Herrington Company.

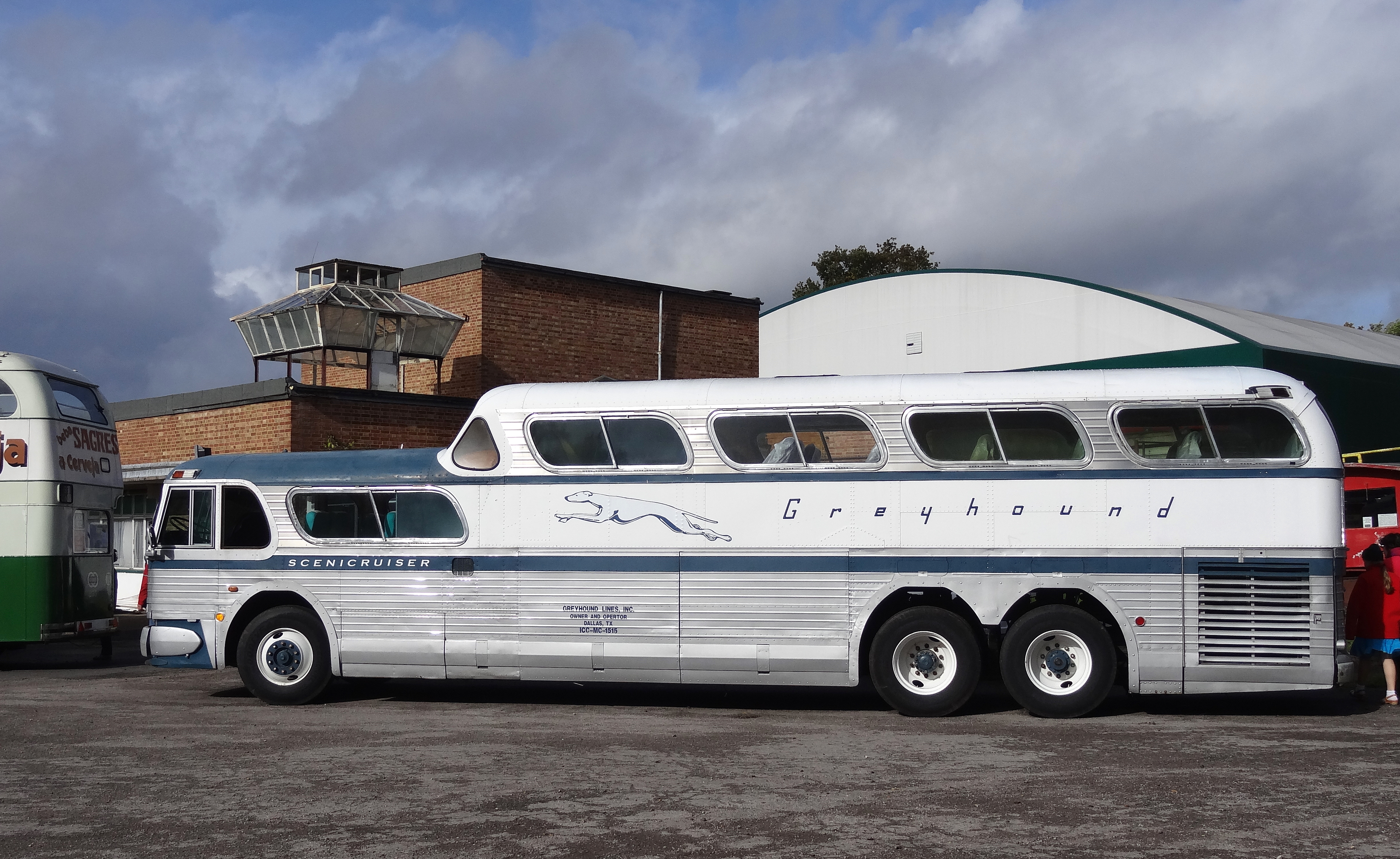
A preserved Scenicruiser on display in the London Bus Museum during 2013

The Scenicruiser's popularity with the public inspired GM's later PD 4107 and PD 4903 Buffalo bus 35- and 40-foot models, which arrived nearly a decade later. They had a less obvious "second level" which ran most of the length of the coach, side windows from GMC's line of transit coaches and a smaller upper scenic windshield in the front because second passenger seats were positioned higher than the driver and first row passenger seats. Unlike the Scenicruiser, these models were available for sale to all operators.

== Impact on the North American bus industry ==
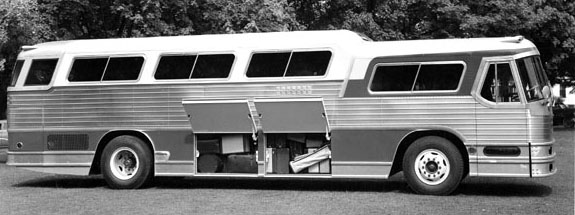
1955 Flxible VistaLiner (VL100)

=== Problems ===
As introduced, the Scenicruiser had some significant problems, particularly the drivetrain and cracking of the frame structure around the side windows in the rear quarter of the coach. GMC was not about to put a non-GM engine into its flagship coach nor did it have a V8 version of its Series 71 Diesel engine at the time. Therefore, GM's solution was to use a pair of 4-71 engines. One Greyhound historian wrote of the Scenicruiser's early technical issues:

Maintenance on the Scenicruiser was a constant headache – partly because of the complicated nature of some of the new systems (in the manner of Rube Goldberg, some of the critics suggested), partly because some of the components were too new and unimproved (using new, unproved, and unimproved technology), partly because the diagnostic tools and techniques were inadequate, partly because the training and availability of mechanics (and maintenance supervisors and managers) for the new model were less than optimum, partly because the technical support and repair-parts support were less than optimum, and largely because of a combination of several of those factors – along with a few other explanations – including, sadly, occasional incidents of careless or intentional abuse of the new coaches by disgusted drivers or mechanics.

GMC solved one major problem in the factory as the 1955 models were being produced. The original clutch was electrically operated. That meant the drivers could not make the clutch smoothly engage; it was either in or out. This caused lurches and jolts every time the driver started from a stop or changed gears. Both the passengers and drivers didn't like it. The electrical clutch linkage was replaced by a mechanical one which solved the problem. GMC gave Greyhound enough sets of parts to convert all of the previously made coaches. At the same time the windshield wipers were changed to a pantograph design, which kept them in full contact with the glass at all times and this was also retrofitted to older coaches. The other problems were mostly solved starting in 1961 when all 979 Scenicruisers were rebuilt, costing Greyhound over US$13 million.

=== Effects ===
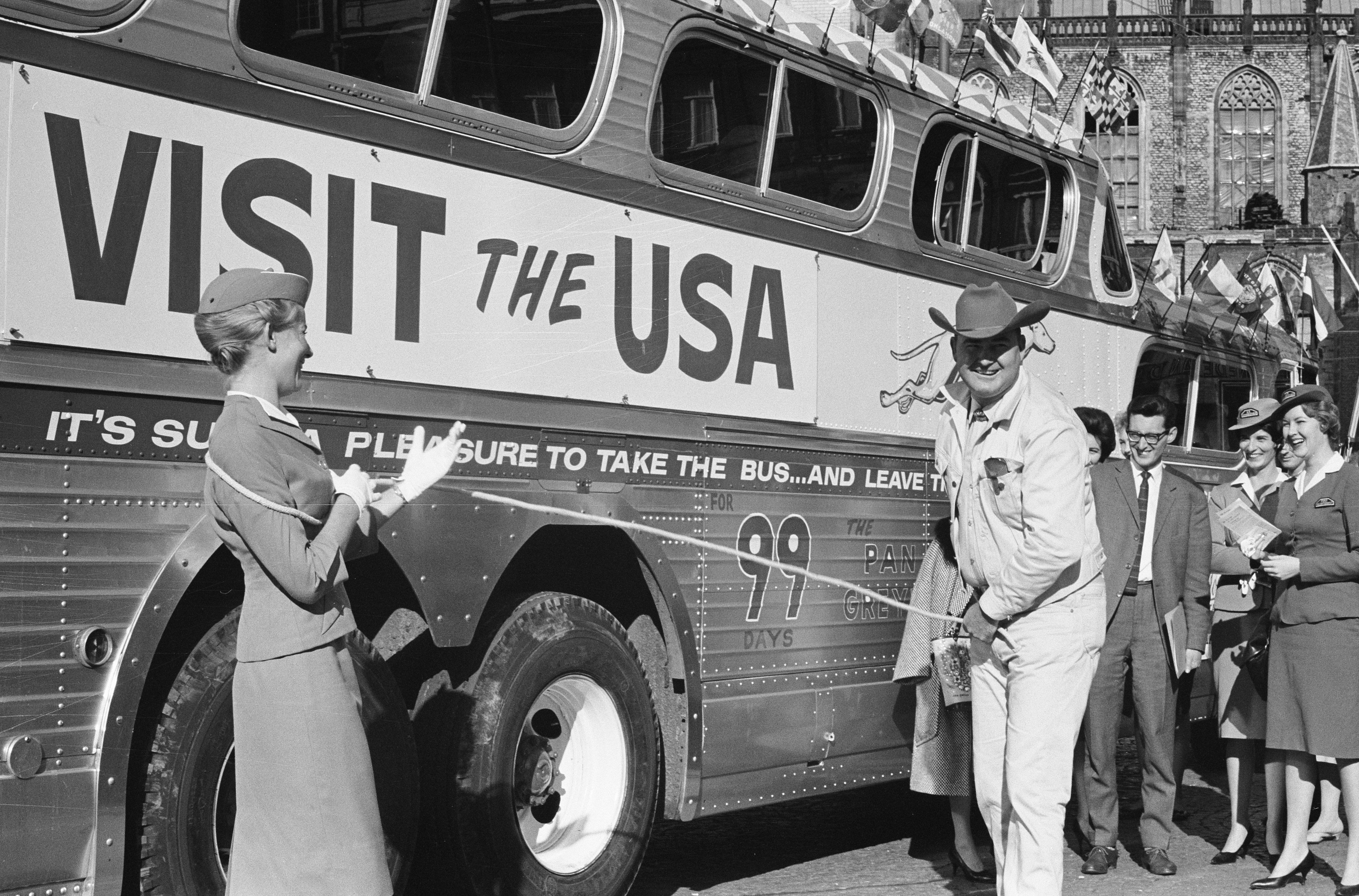
A Scenicruiser in Dam Square, Amsterdam, Netherlands in 1961. The bus is promoting American tourism with Pan Am and Greyhound, featuring a cowboy lassoing two Pan Am flight attendants in front of the bus.

The Scenicruiser caused GMC's top competitors, Flxible and Beck, to bring out similar offerings. Flxible introduced the semi-deck and a half Vista-Liner 100, a 35-foot coach (208 produced between 1955 and 1959) and Beck produced three similar 35-foot coach models for a total of 29 coaches. Beck also built twelve 40-foot Scenicruiser lookalikes in 1955 powered by the 300 HP Cummins NHRBS Diesel engine. They were Beck's model DH1040 and some were delivered new to Queen City Trailways (later Continental Southeastern Lines). Most of Beck's 40-foot coaches were sold to operators in Cuba and Mexico. Beck had to repossess several of them and they later returned to the United States and were resold as used buses. A number of Vista-Liner 100s and at least one of the later Becks have been converted to motor homes and are still on the road.

Mack Truck and Bus also produced a single model MV-620-D prototype in 1957 that was also 40 feet long, but it found no takers, even though Greyhound leased it for several months. This coach still exists in private hands in Ohio. Other two-level models introduced after the Scenicruiser were the Western Flyer T-36-2L, and the impressive four-axle twin-steer Sultana Crucero Imperial.

The problems with the Scenicruisers greatly soured relations between Greyhound and GMC. Greyhound continued to buy GMC coaches with the PD 4104 up through 1960 and the PD 4106 from 1961 to 1964. Given the problems with the PD 4501, Greyhound had no interest in asking GMC to produce a second version of its signature coach based on the PD 4106's mechanicals and styling. Greyhound also bought some PD 4107 buses from GMC which were known as the "Buffalo" model. Greyhound purchased 362 of these buses in two orders (162 in 1966 and 200 more in 1967, with the 1966 units being trouble-prone). The company never bought another GMC coach afterwards. In 1958 The Greyhound Corporation acquired a controlling interest in Motor Coach Industries (MCI), Limited, of Canada and by 1961 had full ownership of it. This led to the end of its need for GMC coaches by 1968. GMC's sales soon went into terminal decline as both Greyhound and Trailways were building their own coaches.

Beck left the bus and coach market in 1957, a year after being taken over by Mack. In 1960 Mack left the market except for a short time as an importer of rebadged Renault FR1 coaches between 1986 and 1989. In 1978, Flxible was sold to Grumman, with the sale including the sale of two prototypes of what would become the 870. Flxible built its last intercity coach in 1969 and its final transit coach in 1995. GMC exited the new coach market after producing the 1980 models and continued transit coach manufacturing until 1987.

== Companion model ==
GMC also introduced its model PD 4901 in 1954 so as to have a 40-foot model for non-Greyhound operators. It was mechanically identical to the Scenicruiser, but the driver and passengers were all at nearly the same high level as the Scenicruiser's upper deck. Like the PD 4104, the PD 4901 had a flat floor so the seats were a few inches lower than in the PD 4501 which allowed larger overhead baggage racks. The only one produced was clad in gold anodized aluminum and GMC called it the Golden Chariot. No American operators in the country wanted to take on the additional complexity and fuel consumption of this dual engine model. Greyhound's troubles with its Scenicruisers were already well known, keeping potential buyers away and none were ordered. GMC leased it to Greyhound and then to several other smaller carriers in the northeast and finally sold it as a used bus. This coach is currently owned by Wilson Bus Lines in Massachusetts who plan to restore it to its former glory.

== Super Scenicruiser ==
In 1961 and 1962, Marmon-Herrington rebuilt the existing Scenicruiser fleet for Greyhound, 22 having already been totaled in accidents. The rebuild included installing the newly available Detroit Diesel 8V-71 engine and a 4-speed unsynchronized Spicer manual transmission in place of the twin 4-71 engines and 3-speed transmission with 2-speed splitter. Side reinforcement plates above the rear wheels and below the upper deck windows under the skin were added. The interiors were also freshened up, but this was done by Greyhound. After the rebuilding, the Super Scenicruiser name replaced the Scenicruiser name on the sides of each coach.

In spite of the reinforcements, structural problems continued and the Scenicruisers that made it into the 1970s again had some external panels removed and further reinforcements added.

== Specifications ==
- Length: 40 feet (12.19 m)
- Width: 96 inches (2,438 mm)
- Height: 134 inches (3,404 mm)
- Wheelbase: 261 inches (6,629 mm)
- Turn radius: 45 feet (13.72 m)
- Powerplant:
  - 1954: 2x GM Diesel 4-71 engine
  - 1961-62 repowering: 1x Detroit Diesel 8V-71 engine
- Transmission: manual, Spicer, 3-speed with 2-speed splitter originally (6 speeds altogether), Spicer 4-speed after repowering
- Fuel Tank: 180 US gallons (150 imp gal; 680 L).
- Seats: 10 on lower level, 33 on upper level. Total 43 seats
- Luggage: 344 cu ft (9.7 m^{3}).
- Aisle width: 14 inches (356 mm)
- Front door width: 26 inches (660 mm)

== Legacy ==
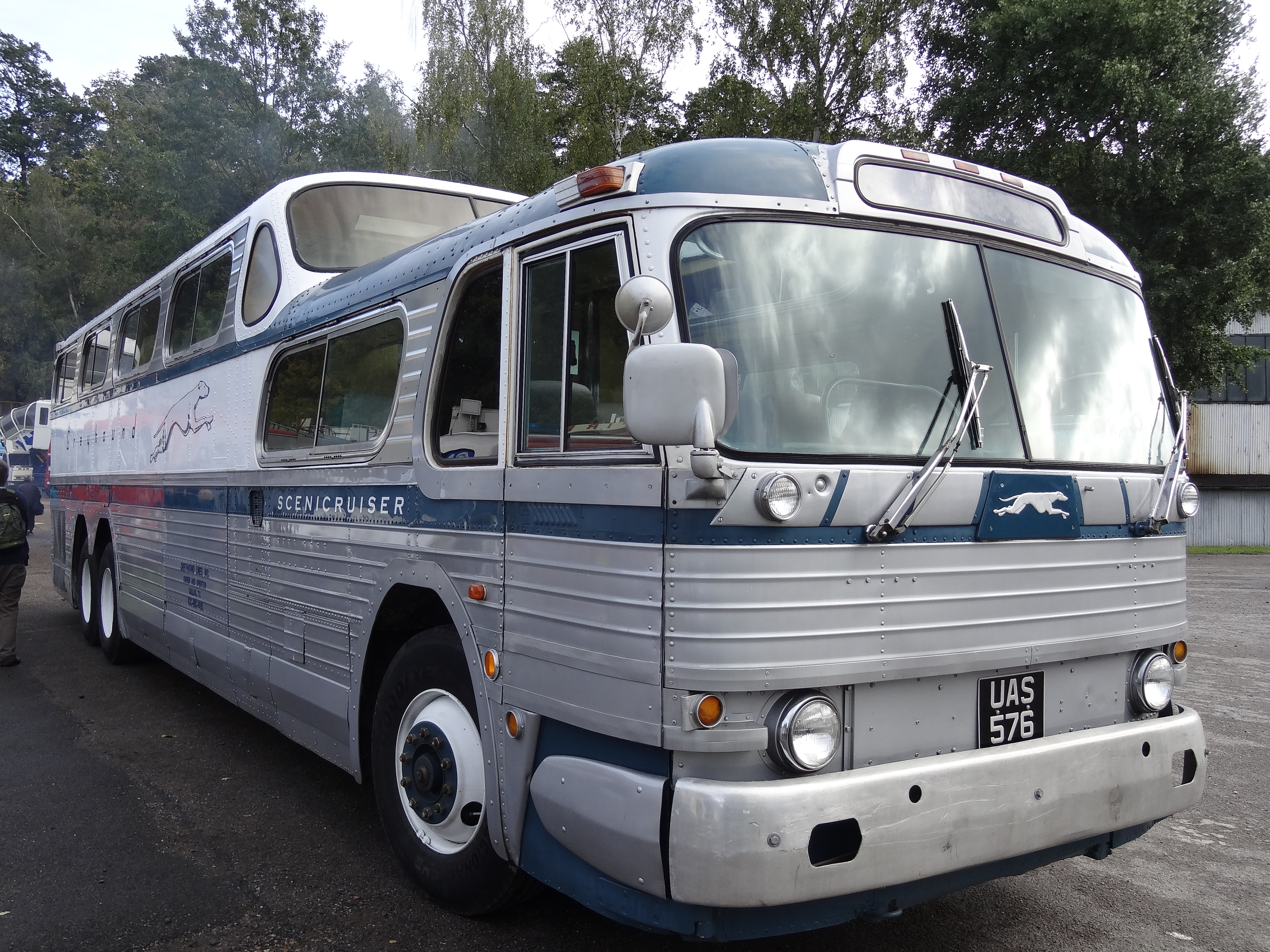
A preserved Scenicruiser in England, 2013

About 200 Scenicruisers were still in service when Greyhound withdrew them around 1975. As of 2015, some of these remain, many converted to motorhomes. Other owners are committed bus enthusiasts who have restored their buses to like-new condition. A number of them were bought as used buses and ran in the colors of their new owners for some years after leaving Greyhound. A few even ended up wearing Trailways red and white after they were bought by Trailways affiliate carriers.

Despite large amounts of quality problems, the Scenicruiser (like the GM New Look bus which shared many design similarities and parts with transit buses) became the definitive Greyhound bus for decades and an icon of 1950s design, even well past the buses' retirement. The influence of the Scenicruiser and its predecessor the Spanish Pegaso Z-403 may be seen in GM's 1964 Buick Sport Wagon and Oldsmobile Vista Cruiser station wagons, both of which had stepped-up roofs and a raised skylight over the second row of seats. The coaches of the Aerotrain, which GM's Electro-Motive Division introduced in 1955, had bodies that resembled parts of the Scenicruiser.

Other manufacturers also make similar split-level coaches, such as Mexico's Sultana Panoramico, first manufactured in 1956.

== Art, music and literature ==
The Pulitzer Prize-winning novel A Confederacy of Dunces, by John Kennedy Toole, includes many obsessively sarcastic references by his main character to a trip in a Scenicruiser coach, which he recounts as a traumatic ordeal.

Country singer Hoyt Axton (1938–1999) used a remodeled 1955 Scenicruiser, purchased from Commander Cody, as his tour bus in the 1970s and '80's. "An Old Greyhound," a song he wrote about the bus, appears on his 1976 album Fearless.

Scenicruiser 472, a 1955 model, gained regional fame as the tour bus for the Mission Mountain Wood Band from the mid-1970s to 1987. It was said to have traveled over two million miles and as of 2014, was still roadworthy.
