= Panasonic Lumix DMC-GX7 =

Digital camera model

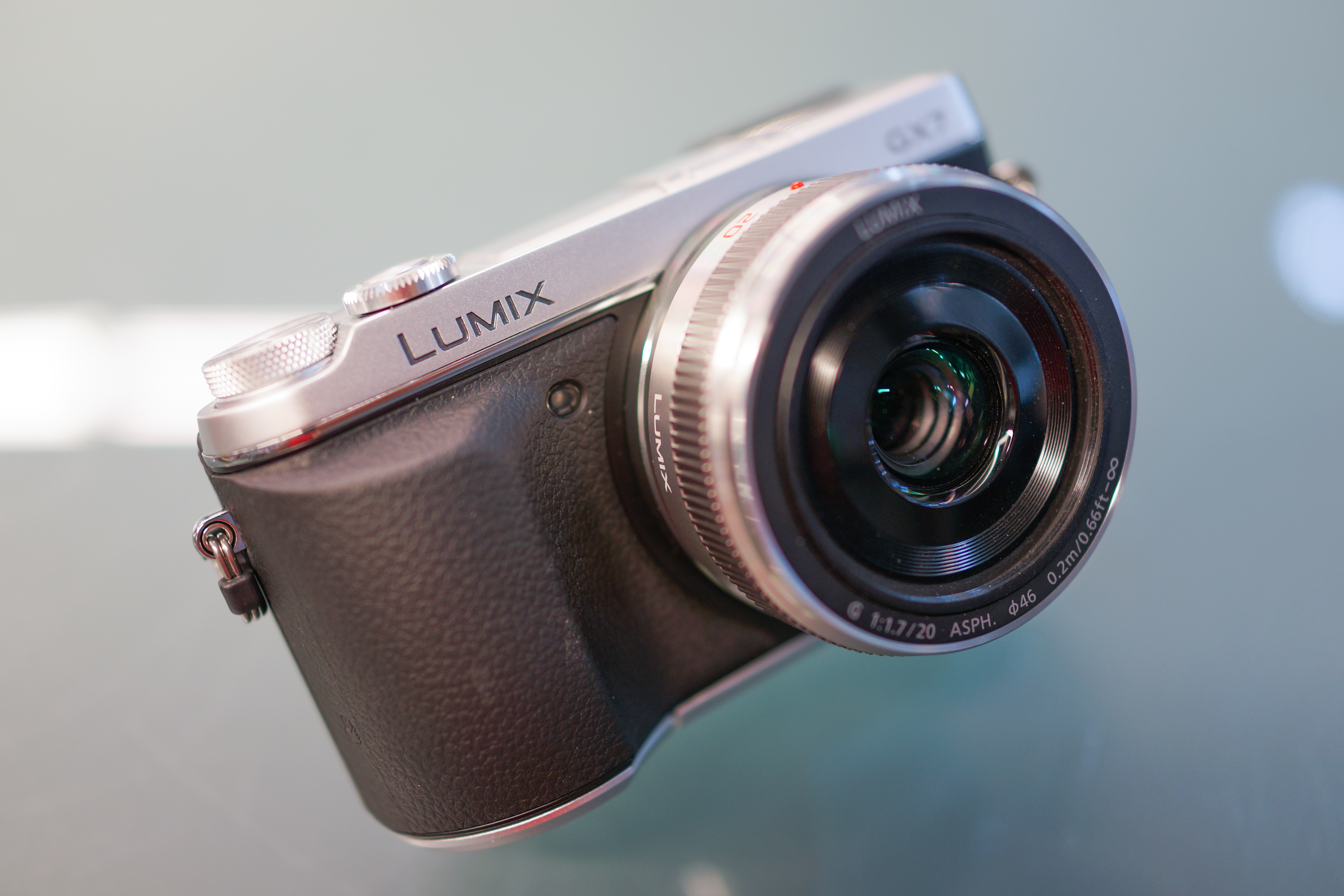

Overview
- Maker: Panasonic Holdings Corporation
- Type: Micro Four Thirds system

Lens
- Lens: Micro Four Thirds system mount

Sensor/medium
- Sensor: 4/3 type MOS ('Live MOS sensor')
- Sensor size: 17.3 x 13.0 mm (in 4:3 aspect ratio)
- Maximum resolution: 4592 x 3448 (16.0 megapixels)
- Storage media: SD /SDHC / SDXC

Focusing
- Focus modes: AF Single, AF Flexible, AF Continuous, Manual focus, Face Detection, AF Tracking, 23 Area Focusing / 1 Area Focusing, Pinpoint, AF detection range: EV -4 – 18 (ISO 100), Quick AF, Continuous AF, AF+MF, Eye Sensor AF, Touch AF/AE, Touch Pad AF, Touch Shutter, MF Assist, One Shot AF

Exposure/metering
- Exposure modes: Aperture priority, Shutter, Program AE, Manual, iAuto, SCN, Movie, Custom (3)
- Metering modes: Multiple, Center-Weighted, Spot

Flash
- Flash: Built-in flash + hot shoe for external

Shutter
- Shutter: Mechanical shutter / Electronic shutter
- Shutter speed range: 60–1/8000 sec
- Continuous shooting: 9 RAW images,

Viewfinder
- Viewfinder: built-in 2.7MP, tilting LCV Live View Finder, with eye sensor

Image processing
- White balance: Auto, Daylight, Cloudy, Shade, Incandescent, Flash, White Set 1/2, Color temperature setting

General
- Video recording: AVCHD / MP4, NTSC / PAL, 1080p (25, 30, 60 fps), 720p (24, 50, 60 fps), 480p (25, 30 fps)
- LCD screen: tilting 3 inch (3:2 aspect ratio), 1,040,000 dots
- Battery: 1025 mAh 7.2v Lithium-Ion rechargeable battery
- Dimensions: 123 mm × 71 mm × 54 mm (4.83 × 2.78 × 2.15 inches)
- Weight: Approx. 402 g (14.2 oz) (camera body with battery and SD card)

The Panasonic Lumix DMC-GX7 announced in August 2013, is a Micro Four Thirds compact mirrorless interchangeable lens camera. It was Panasonic's first Micro Four Thirds camera with a built-in in-body stabilization system (IBIS) and has a built-in EVF (add-on EVFs are no-longer supported). Panasonic uses 2-axis in-body stabilization allowing the use of shutter speeds 1 to 2 stops slower than without stabilization, compared to the 4 to 5 stops of improvement offered by Olympus' 5-axis stabilization.

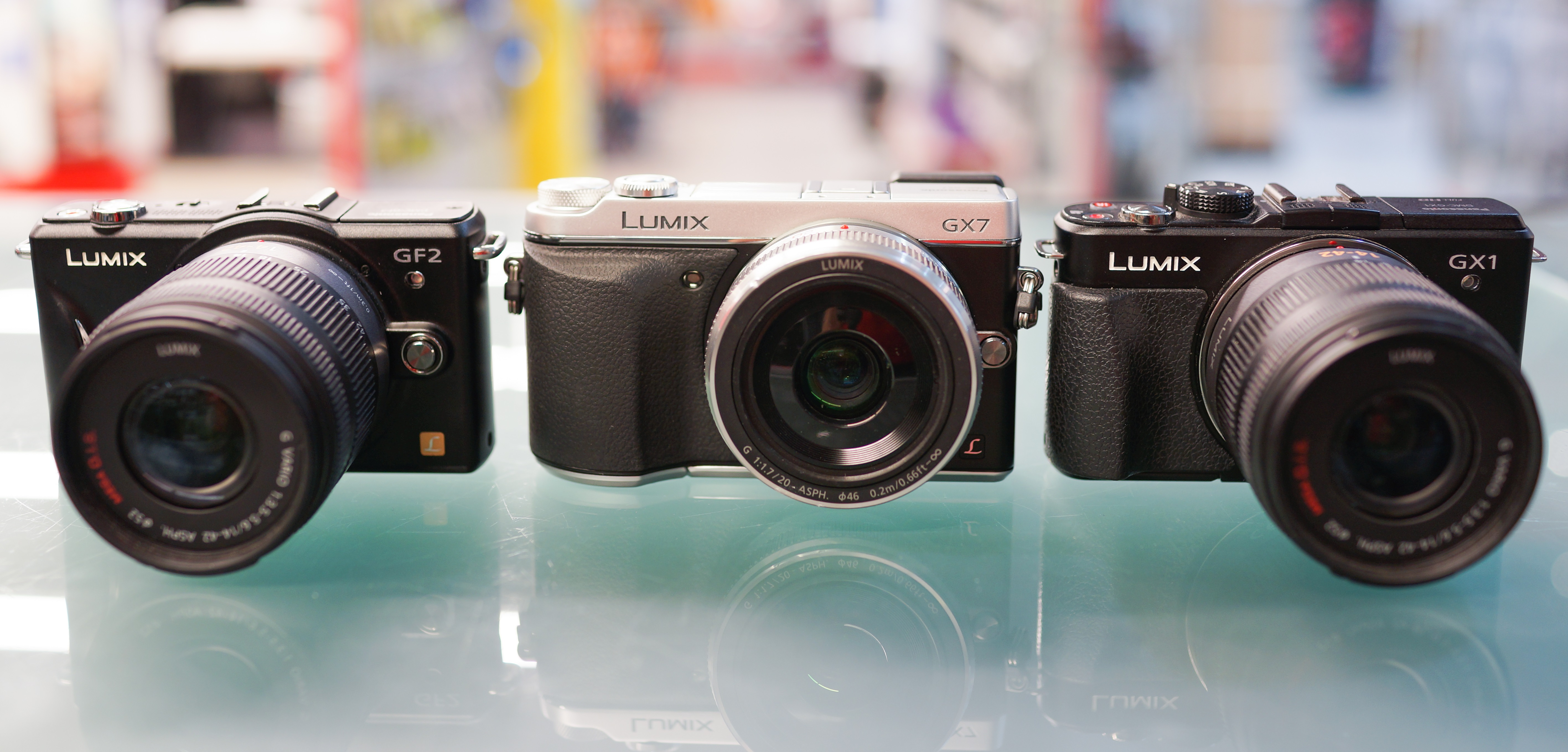
Comparison of GF2, GX7 and GX1.

Features include:

- Magnesium alloy body
- New 16 MP Live MOS, Four Thirds sensor (25% better Signal to Noise performance, 10% better sensitivity, 10% better saturation level)
- Venus Engine
- ISO 200 - 25,600 (ISO 125 in extended mode, max. 3,200 in movie mode)
- Maximum shutter speed 1/8000 sec.
- AF detective range: -4 EV to 18 EV
- Micro Four Thirds mount
- Full HD video capture, including 1920 x 1080/60p (AVCHD or MP4 formats)
- Full-time AF and tracking AF also available in cinema-like 24p video with a bit rate of maximum 24 Mbit/s
- Built-in live view finder (electronic view finder, EVF), 90-degree tilt-able, 2.764M pixel resolution with 100% Adobe RGB color reproduction
- Built-in 3", 1040K pixel tilting (45 deg. up, 80 deg. down), touch-screen LCD screen
- Built-in flash (and hot-shoe)
- Sensor-shift, in-body image stabilization (2-axis)
- 5fps using single AF with mechanical shutter / 60fps with electronic shutter up to 12 frames
- Focus Peaking
- 22 creative effects, HDR
- Panoramic mode, with filters
- Silent Mode, electronic shutter mode
- Near Field Communication (NFC)
- Wi-Fi connectivity
- Black / Silver versions
- Introduction price: $999 in the US (body only)

== Successor ==
Although the Panasonic GX8 has the succeeding number, it is a model not related to the GX7 line. The true successor of the GX7 is the Panasonic GX80/GX85, which is called GX7 mark II in some markets. The Panasonic GX80/GX85 has the same 16mp sensor, but without the AA-filter. It also has greatly improved IBIS and comes with a new shutter mechanism. The tilting viewfinder is no longer available. This came back though with the Panasonic GX9, which is called GX7 mark III in some markets.

Preceded by Panasonic Lumix DMC-GX1	Panasonic Micro Four Thirds System cameras August 2013–August 2015	Succeeded by Panasonic Lumix DMC-GX8

Brand	Form	Class	2008	2009	2010	2011			2012	2013	2014	2015	2016	2017	2018	2019	2020	2021	2022	2023	2024	2025	2026
Olympus	SLR style OM-D	Professional															E-M1X ^{R}						
Olympus	SLR style OM-D	High-end									E-M1			E-M1 II ^{R}			E-M1 III ^{R}						
Olympus	SLR style OM-D	Advanced							E-M5			E-M5 II ^{R}					E-M5 III ^{R}						
Olympus	SLR style OM-D	Mid-range									E-M10		E-M10 II		E-M10 III			E-M10 IV					
Olympus	Rangefinder style PEN	Mid-range		E-P1	E-P2		E-P3				E-P5		PEN-F ^{R}										
Olympus	Rangefinder style PEN	Upper-entry			E-PL1	E-PL2		E-PL3	E-PL5		E-PL6	E-PL7		E-PL8	E-PL9		E-PL10						
Olympus	Rangefinder style PEN	Entry-level					E-PM1		E-PM2														
Olympus	remote													Air									
OM System	SLR style	Professional																	OM-1 ^{R}		OM-1 II ^{R}		
OM System	SLR style	High-end																				OM-3 ^{R}	
OM System	SLR style	Advanced																		OM-5 ^{R}			OM-5 II ^{R}
OM System	PEN	Mid-range																	E-P7				
Panasonic	SLR style	High-end Video													GH5S				GH6 ^{R}			GH7 ^{R}	
Panasonic	SLR style	High-end Photo													G9 ^{R}						G9 II ^{R}		
Panasonic	SLR style	High-end		GH1		GH2			GH3		GH4				GH5				GH5II				
Panasonic	SLR style	Mid-range		G1	G2		G3		G5		G6		G7	G80/G85			G90/G95						
Panasonic	SLR style	Entry-level			G10													G100			G100D		
Panasonic	Rangefinder style	Advanced							GX1		GX7		GX8		GX9								
Panasonic	Rangefinder style	Mid-range									GM1	GM5	GX80/GX85										
Panasonic	Rangefinder style	Entry-level			GF1	GF2	GF3		GF5		GF6	GF7	GF8	GX800/GX850/GF9		GX880/GF10/GF90							
Panasonic	Camcorder	Professional							AG-AF104														
Kodak	Rangefinder style	Entry-level										S-1											
DJI	Drone	.												Zenmuse X5S									
DJI	Drone	.												Zenmuse X5									
YI	Rangefinder style	Entry-level												M1									
Yongnuo	Rangefinder style	Android camera															YN450M		YN455				
Blackmagic Design	Rangefinder style	High-End Video							Cinema Camera														
Blackmagic Design	Rangefinder style	High-End Video									Pocket Cinema Camera					Pocket Cinema Camera 4K							
Blackmagic Design		High-End Video										Micro Cinema Camera									Micro Studio Camera 4K G2		
Z CAM	Cinema	Advanced											E1			E2							
Z CAM	Cinema	Mid-Range																E2-M4					
Z CAM	Cinema	Entry-Level															E2C						
JVC	Camcorder	Professional										GY-LS300											
SVS-Vistek		Industrial							EVO Tracer														
