= Panasonic Lumix DC-GX9 =

Digital camera model

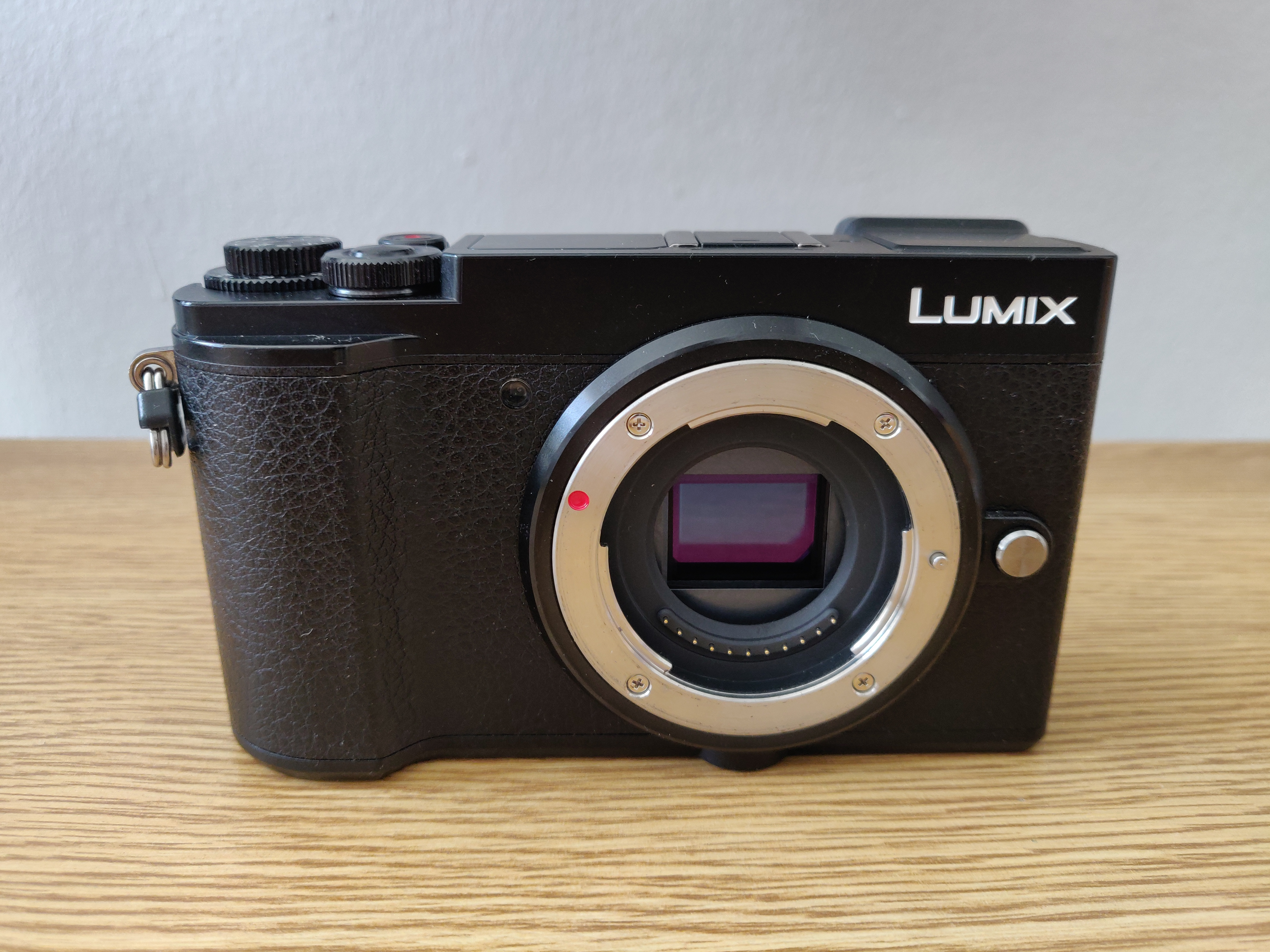

Overview
- Maker: Panasonic
- Released: March 2018

Lens
- Lens mount: Micro Four Thirds

Sensor/medium
- Sensor type: CMOS
- Sensor size: 17.3 × 13 mm (Four Thirds type)
- Maximum resolution: 5184 × 3888 (20.3 megapixels)
- Film speed: ISO 200–25600 (100 expanded)
- Recording medium: SD, SDHC or SDXC memory card

Focusing
- Focus areas: 49 focus points

Shutter
- Shutter speeds: 1/16000 s to 60 s
- Continuous shooting: 30 FPS

Viewfinder
- Viewfinder magnification: 1.39
- Frame coverage: 100%

Image processing
- Image processor: Venus Engine
- White balance: Yes

General
- LCD screen: 3.0" with 1.04M dots
- AV port(s): microHDMI
- Data port(s): USB 2.0 Micro-B
- Dimensions: 124×72.1×46.8 mm (4.88×2.84×1.84 in)
- Weight: 450 g (16 oz) including battery

Chronology
- Predecessor: Panasonic Lumix DMC-GX8

The Panasonic Lumix DC-GX9 (known as the Lumix DC-GX7MK3 in Japan) is a digital rangefinder-styled mirrorless interchangeable-lens camera announced by Panasonic in February 2018.

Described as "most readily compared to the GX80," it features a 20 megapixel sensor, 5-axis image stabilization, Depth from Defocus (DFD) contrast-detect AF, a 3.0-inch tiltable touchscreen LCD and a tilting 2.76M-dot electronic viewfinder. The camera's ISO range is from 200 to 25600 and it features up to 6 frames per second burst shooting with continuous auto focus. The camera records 4K video at 30fps. It was named one of the best Panasonic cameras in 2023 by Digital Camera World.

== Gallery ==
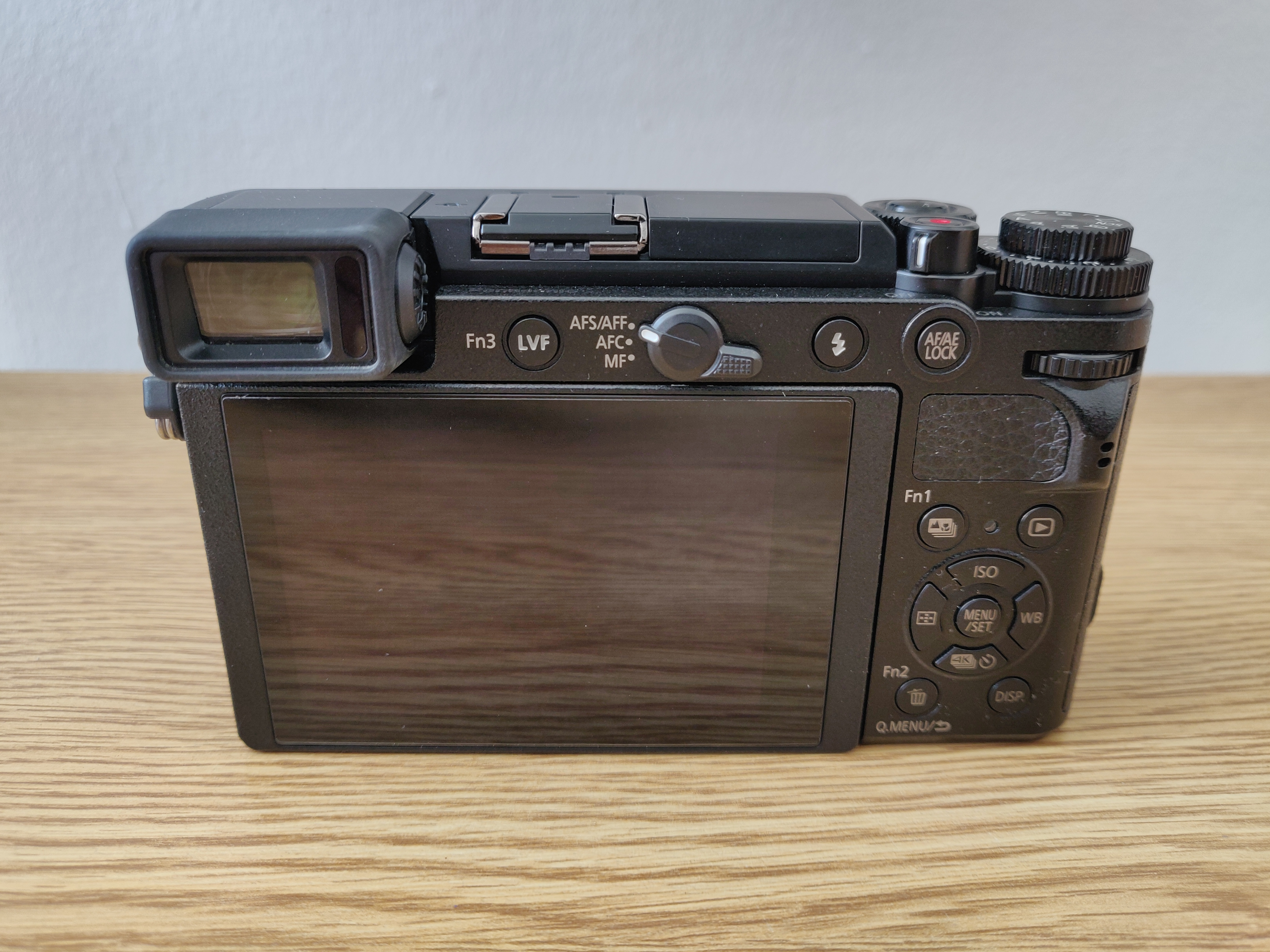

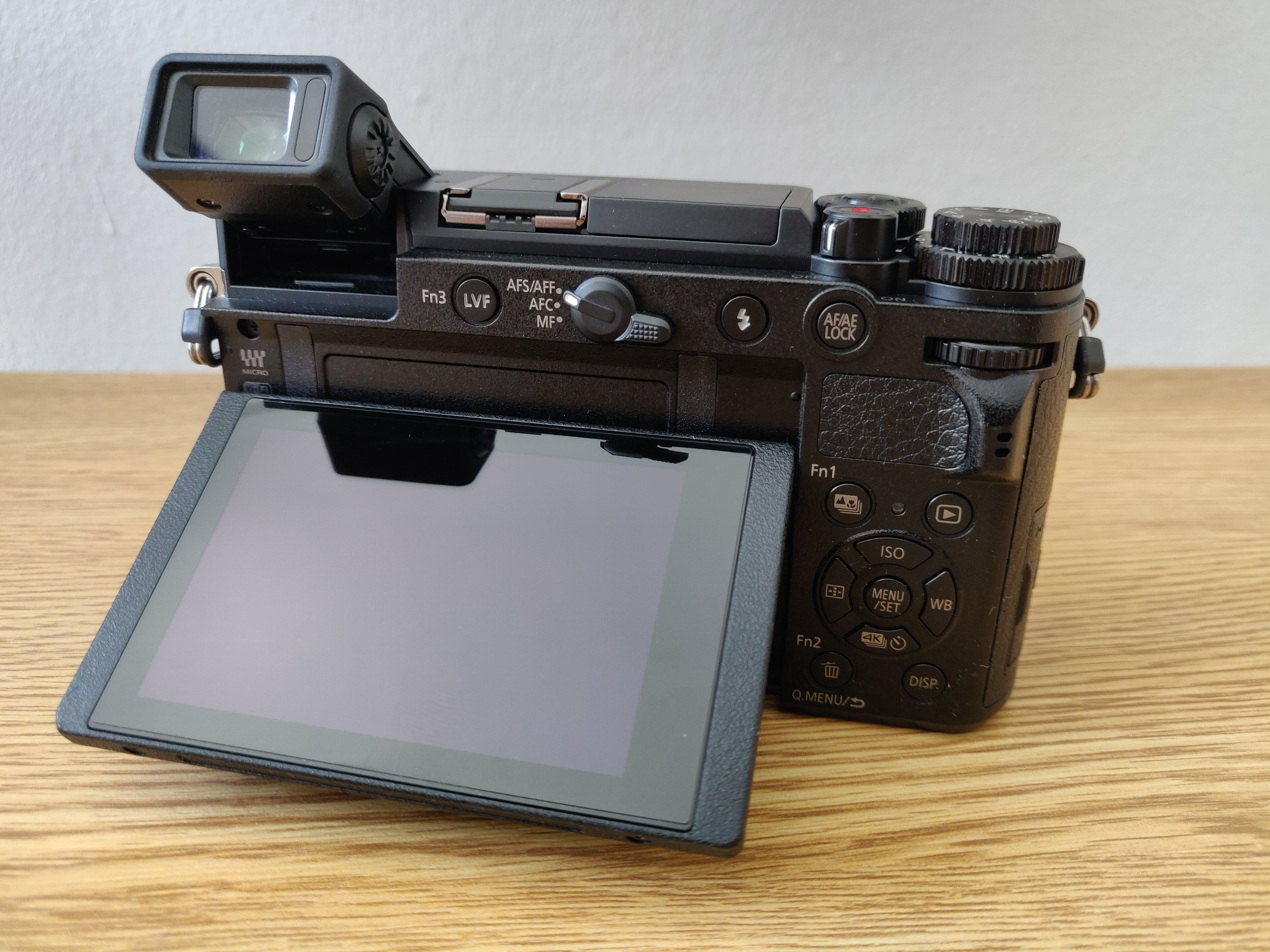

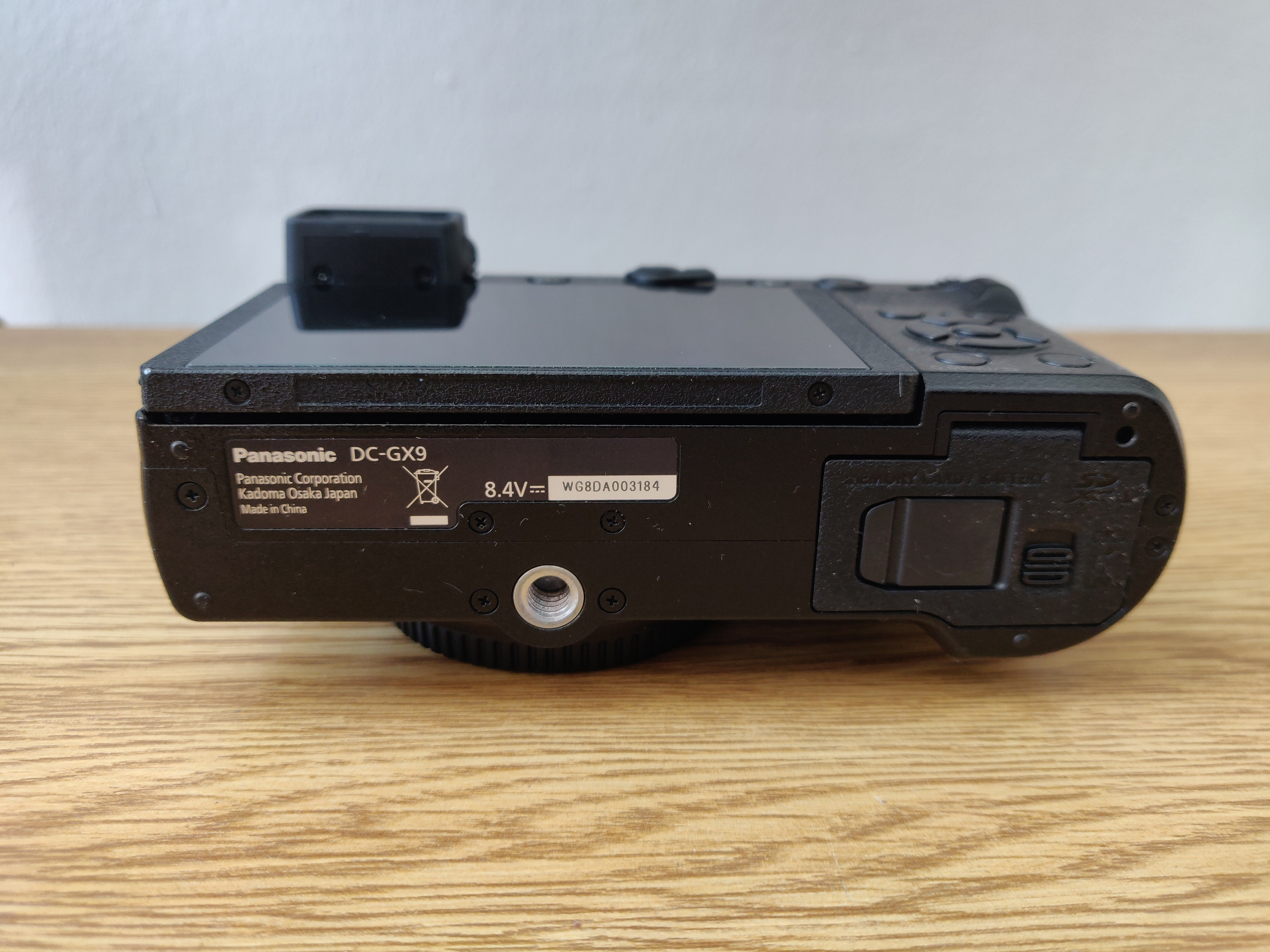

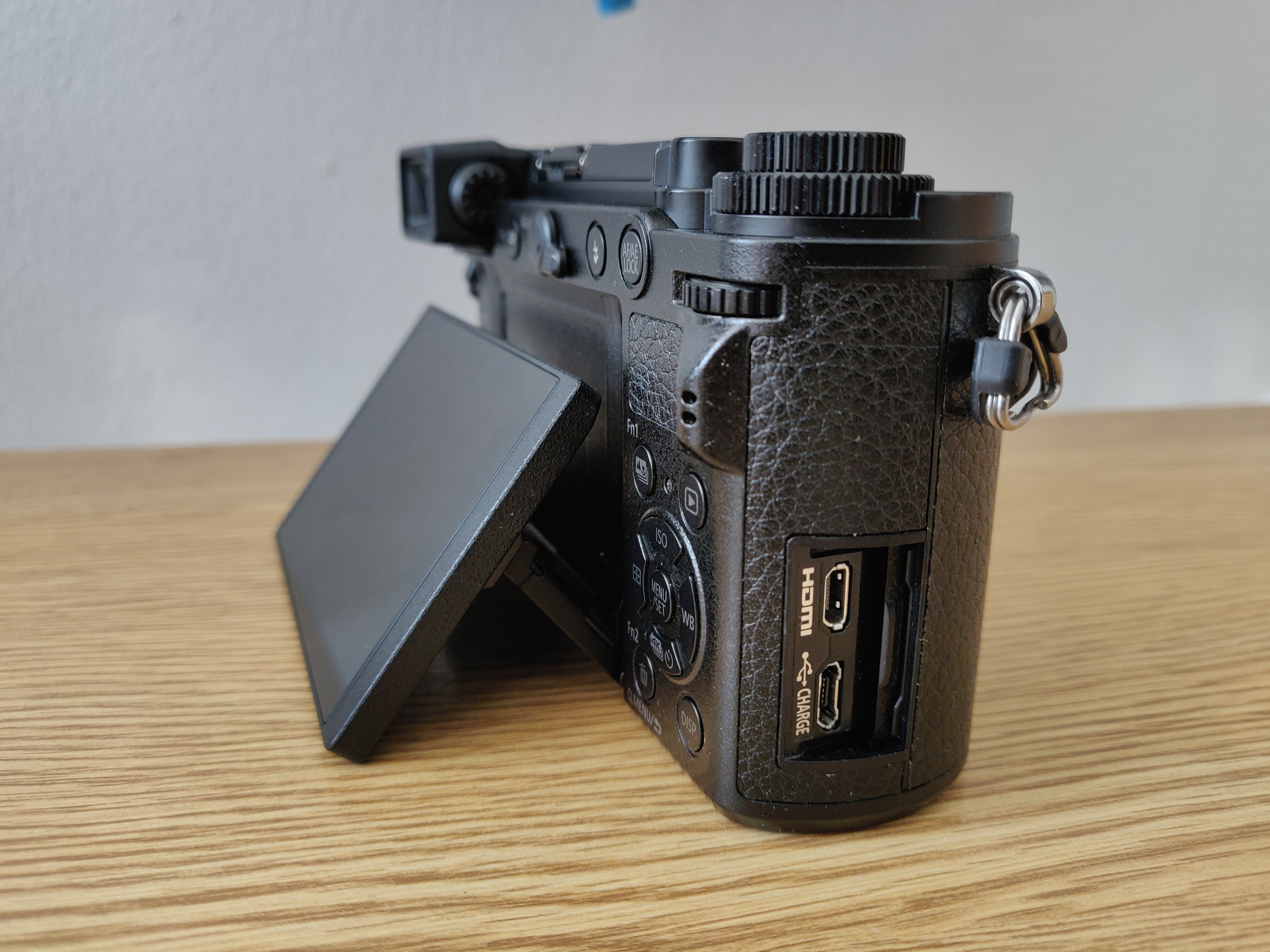

Brand	Form	Class	2008	2009	2010	2011			2012	2013	2014	2015	2016	2017	2018	2019	2020	2021	2022	2023	2024	25
Olympus	SLR style OM-D	Professional															E-M1X ^{R}					
Olympus	SLR style OM-D	High-end									E-M1			E-M1 II ^{R}			E-M1 III ^{R}					
Olympus	SLR style OM-D	Advanced							E-M5			E-M5 II ^{R}					E-M5 III ^{R}					
Olympus	SLR style OM-D	Mid-range									E-M10		E-M10 II		E-M10 III			E-M10 IV				
Olympus	Rangefinder style PEN	Mid-range		E-P1	E-P2		E-P3				E-P5		PEN-F ^{R}									
Olympus	Rangefinder style PEN	Upper-entry			E-PL1	E-PL2		E-PL3	E-PL5		E-PL6	E-PL7		E-PL8	E-PL9		E-PL10					
Olympus	Rangefinder style PEN	Entry-level					E-PM1		E-PM2													
Olympus	remote													Air								
OM System	SLR style	Professional																	OM-1 ^{R}		OM-1 II ^{R}	
OM System	SLR style	High-end																				OM-3 ^{R}
OM System	SLR style	Advanced																		OM-5 ^{R}		
OM System	PEN	Mid-range																	E-P7			
Panasonic	SLR style	High-end Video													GH5S				GH6 ^{R}			GH7 ^{R}
Panasonic	SLR style	High-end Photo													G9 ^{R}						G9 II ^{R}	
Panasonic	SLR style	High-end		GH1		GH2			GH3		GH4				GH5				GH5II			
Panasonic	SLR style	Mid-range		G1	G2		G3		G5		G6		G7	G80/G85			G90/G95					
Panasonic	SLR style	Entry-level			G10													G100			G100D	
Panasonic	Rangefinder style	Advanced							GX1		GX7		GX8		GX9							
Panasonic	Rangefinder style	Mid-range									GM1	GM5	GX80/GX85									
Panasonic	Rangefinder style	Entry-level			GF1	GF2	GF3		GF5		GF6	GF7	GF8	GX800/GX850/GF9		GX880/GF10/GF90						
Panasonic	Camcorder	Professional							AG-AF104													
Kodak	Rangefinder style	Entry-level										S-1										
DJI	Drone	.												Zenmuse X5S								
DJI	Drone	.												Zenmuse X5								
YI	Rangefinder style	Entry-level												M1								
Yongnuo	Rangefinder style	Android camera															YN450M		YN455			
Blackmagic Design	Rangefinder style	High-End Video							Cinema Camera													
Blackmagic Design	Rangefinder style	High-End Video									Pocket Cinema Camera					Pocket Cinema Camera 4K						
Blackmagic Design		High-End Video										Micro Cinema Camera									Micro Studio Camera 4K G2	
Z CAM	Cinema	Advanced											E1			E2						
Z CAM	Cinema	Mid-Range																E2-M4				
Z CAM	Cinema	Entry-Level															E2C					
JVC	Camcorder	Professional										GY-LS300										
SVS-Vistek		Industrial							EVO Tracer													
