= Panasonic Lumix DMC-GX1 =

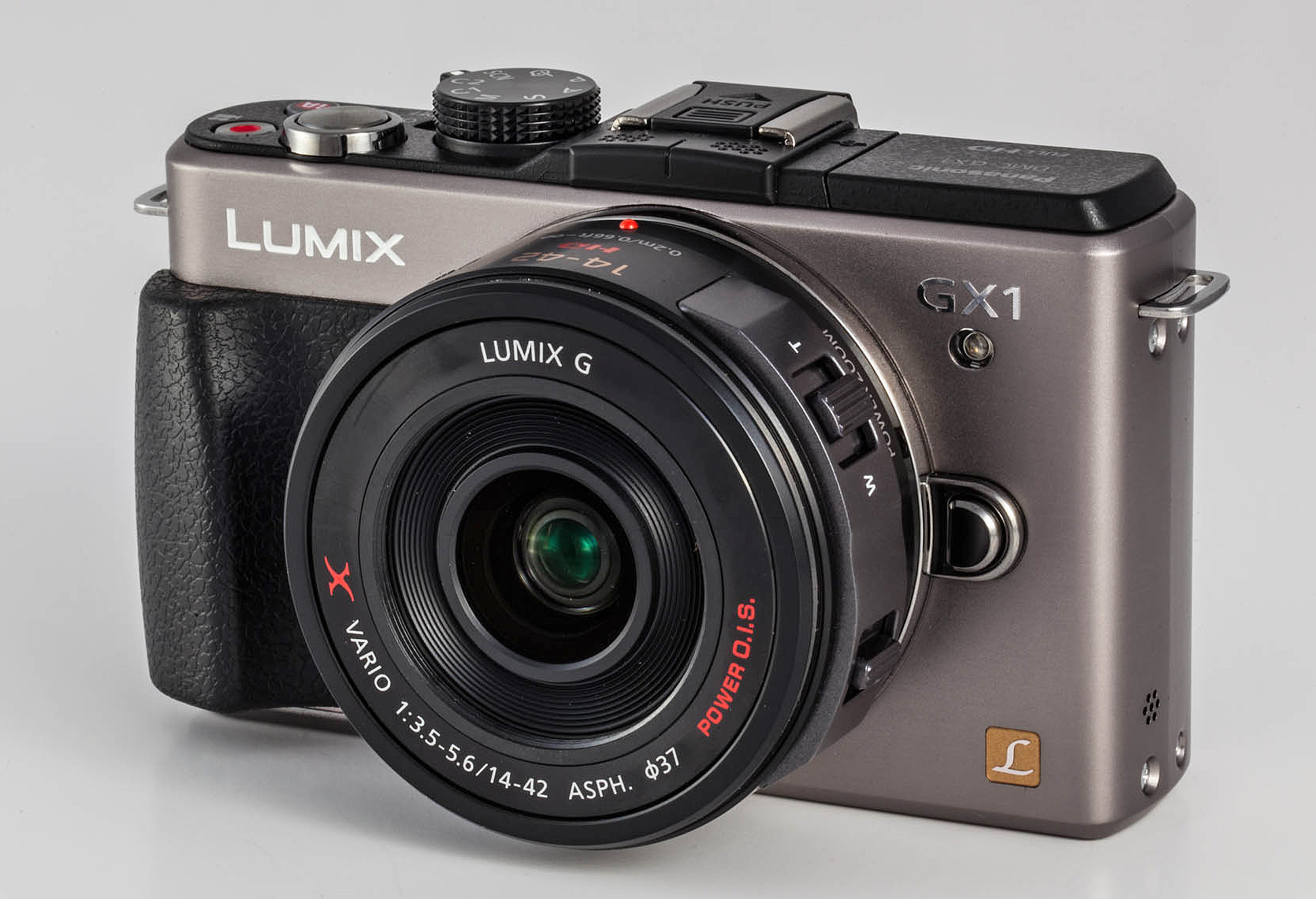
- The Panasonic DMC-GX1 (shown with the Panasonic Lumix 14-42mm lens)

Overview
- Maker: Panasonic Holdings Corporation
- Type: Micro Four Thirds system

Lens
- Lens: Micro Four Thirds system mount

Sensor/medium
- Sensor: 4/3 type MOS ('Live MOS sensor')
- Maximum resolution: 4592 x 3448 (16.0 megapixels)
- Storage media: SD /SDHC /MMC

Focusing
- Focus modes: Auto Focus, Manual focus, Face Detection, AF Tracking, 23-Area-Focusing/1 Area Focusing, Single or Continuous AF, AF detection range: EV 0–18 (f/3.5 lens, ISO 160), Pre AF (Quick AF/Continuous AF), AF+MF, MF Assist (5x, 10x)

Exposure/metering
- Exposure modes: Program AE, Aperture priority AE, Shutter priority AE, Manual, iAuto, SCN, Movie, Custom (2)
- Metering modes: Multiple-Weighted, Center-Weighted, Spot

Shutter
- Shutter speed range: 60–1/4000 sec
- Continuous shooting: 7 RAW images,

Viewfinder
- Viewfinder: Optional External Electronic Viewfinder

General
- LCD screen: 460,000 dots, 480x320 (HVGA)
- Battery: 1250 mAh 7.2v Lithium-Ion rechargeable battery
- Dimensions: 119 mm × 71 mm × 36.3 mm (4.69 × 2.8 × 1.43 inches)
- Weight: Approx. 318 g (11.2 oz) (camera body with battery)

Panasonic Lumix DMC-GX1 is a micro four thirds camera which was announced 7 November 2011.

== Features ==
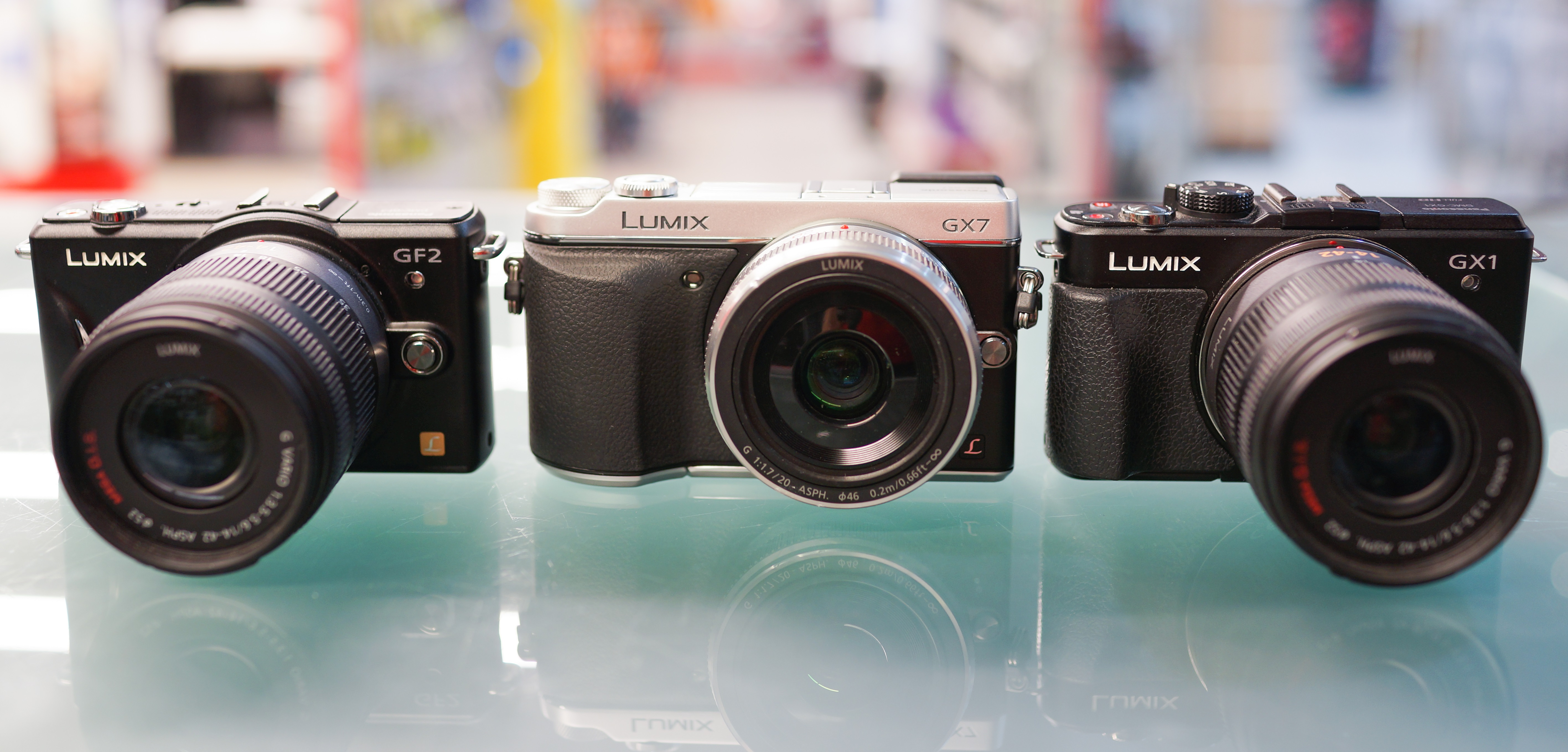
Comparison of GF2, GX7 and GX1.

The DMC-GX1 has a 16MP sensor with a top ISO of 12,800. The 460,000 dot (480x320, HVGA) 3.0" fixed LCD functions as a touch screen. The camera will create full AVCHD 1080/60i video from 30fps sensor output. Continuous full resolution shooting is 4fps while burst mode allows continuous shooting up to 20fps at a lower resolution. Extra function buttons were added bringing the total to four, two of which are on the touch screen. Auto bracketing will create sets of 3, 5 or 7 exposures at 1/3, 2/3 or 1 stop.

Preceded by Debatable – Panasonic Lumix DMC-GF1 or Panasonic Lumix DMC-GF5	Panasonic Micro Four Thirds System cameras November 2012–present	Succeeded by Panasonic Lumix DMC-GX7

Brand	Form	Class	2008	2009	2010	2011			2012	2013	2014	2015	2016	2017	2018	2019	2020	2021	2022	2023	2024	2025	2026
Olympus	SLR style OM-D	Professional															E-M1X ^{R}						
Olympus	SLR style OM-D	High-end									E-M1			E-M1 II ^{R}			E-M1 III ^{R}						
Olympus	SLR style OM-D	Advanced							E-M5			E-M5 II ^{R}					E-M5 III ^{R}						
Olympus	SLR style OM-D	Mid-range									E-M10		E-M10 II		E-M10 III			E-M10 IV					
Olympus	Rangefinder style PEN	Mid-range		E-P1	E-P2		E-P3				E-P5		PEN-F ^{R}										
Olympus	Rangefinder style PEN	Upper-entry			E-PL1	E-PL2		E-PL3	E-PL5		E-PL6	E-PL7		E-PL8	E-PL9		E-PL10						
Olympus	Rangefinder style PEN	Entry-level					E-PM1		E-PM2														
Olympus	remote													Air									
OM System	SLR style	Professional																	OM-1 ^{R}		OM-1 II ^{R}		
OM System	SLR style	High-end																				OM-3 ^{R}	
OM System	SLR style	Advanced																		OM-5 ^{R}			OM-5 II ^{R}
OM System	PEN	Mid-range																	E-P7				
Panasonic	SLR style	High-end Video													GH5S				GH6 ^{R}			GH7 ^{R}	
Panasonic	SLR style	High-end Photo													G9 ^{R}						G9 II ^{R}		
Panasonic	SLR style	High-end		GH1		GH2			GH3		GH4				GH5				GH5II				
Panasonic	SLR style	Mid-range		G1	G2		G3		G5		G6		G7	G80/G85			G90/G95						
Panasonic	SLR style	Entry-level			G10													G100			G100D		
Panasonic	Rangefinder style	Advanced							GX1		GX7		GX8		GX9								
Panasonic	Rangefinder style	Mid-range									GM1	GM5	GX80/GX85										
Panasonic	Rangefinder style	Entry-level			GF1	GF2	GF3		GF5		GF6	GF7	GF8	GX800/GX850/GF9		GX880/GF10/GF90							
Panasonic	Camcorder	Professional							AG-AF104														
Kodak	Rangefinder style	Entry-level										S-1											
DJI	Drone	.												Zenmuse X5S									
DJI	Drone	.												Zenmuse X5									
YI	Rangefinder style	Entry-level												M1									
Yongnuo	Rangefinder style	Android camera															YN450M		YN455				
Blackmagic Design	Rangefinder style	High-End Video							Cinema Camera														
Blackmagic Design	Rangefinder style	High-End Video									Pocket Cinema Camera					Pocket Cinema Camera 4K							
Blackmagic Design		High-End Video										Micro Cinema Camera									Micro Studio Camera 4K G2		
Z CAM	Cinema	Advanced											E1			E2							
Z CAM	Cinema	Mid-Range																E2-M4					
Z CAM	Cinema	Entry-Level															E2C						
JVC	Camcorder	Professional										GY-LS300											
SVS-Vistek		Industrial							EVO Tracer														
