= Canon T series =

Manual-focus single-lens reflex camera series

Canon's T series is Canon's final series of manual focus 35 mm single lens reflex cameras. The first camera, the T50, was introduced in March 1983 while the final camera, the T60, was released in April 1990. All have a Canon FD lens mount compatible with Canon's extensive range of manual-focus lenses.

The T series attempted to update the SLR concept. In the early 1980s, the SLR market share was declining with the increased popularity of highly automated 35 mm compact cameras; the T series introduced much more automation to the SLR camera, making it almost as easy to use as a point and shoot camera.

The final model, the Canon T60, was the odd one out; it was introduced after the FD manual lens mount was already obsolete, and while it carried over a few T-series styling cues, it was a manual camera supporting only aperture priority auto-exposure. In addition, it was not even made by Canon themselves; they subcontracted the manufacture to Cosina, and the chassis itself was based upon that of the Cosina CT-1.

- T50 (March 1983)
- T70 (April 1984)
- T80 (April 1985)
- T90 (February 1986)
- T60 (April 1990)

	1971	1972	1973	1974	1975	1976	1977	1978	1979	1980	1981	1982	1983	1984	1985	1986	1987	1988	1989	1990	1991	1992	1993
Professional																T90							
Professional		F-1 High Speed Motor Drive Camera												New F-1 High Speed Motor Drive Camera									
Professional	F-1						F-1N / F-1 (Later Model)					New F-1											
Amateur				EF					A-1														
Amateur															T70								
Amateur	FTb			FTb-N			AE-1					AE-1 Program											
Amateur					TLb					AV-1			AL-1			T80							
Amateur					TX		AT-1							T50							T60		
