= Canon T80 =

T80
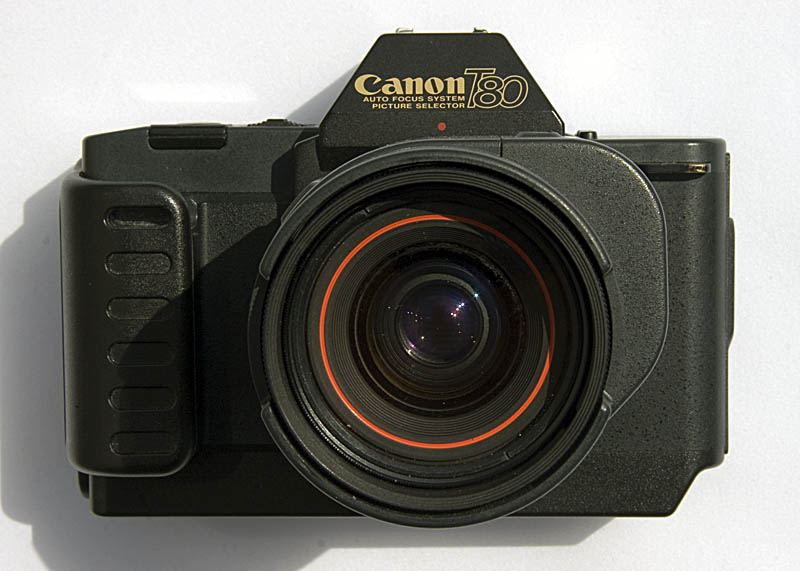
- A Canon T80 with the standard 50mm AC lens

Overview
- Maker: Canon Inc.
- Type: SLR

Lens
- Lens mount: Canon FD lens mount
- Lens: interchangeable lens (Canon FD AC mount)

Sensor/medium
- Film format: 35mm

Focusing
- Focus modes: Auto, Manual, Assisted Manual

Exposure/metering
- Exposure modes: Program, Manual, various scene modes

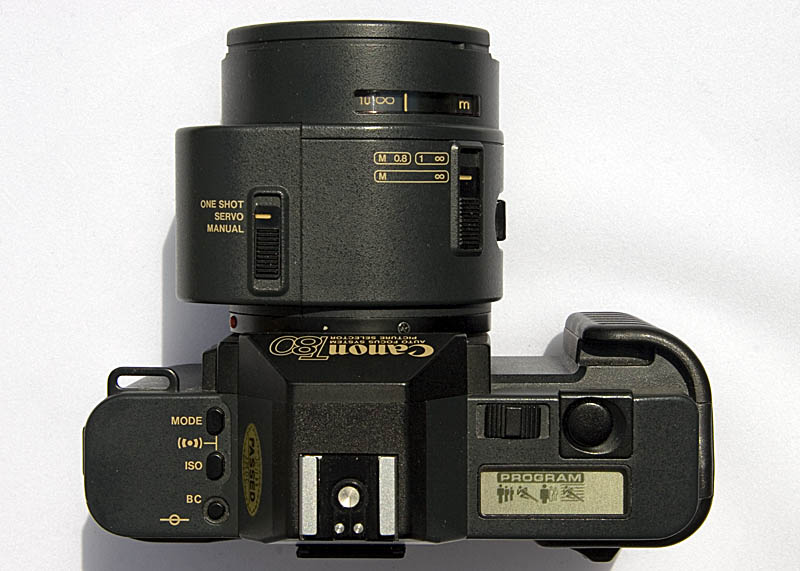
Top view

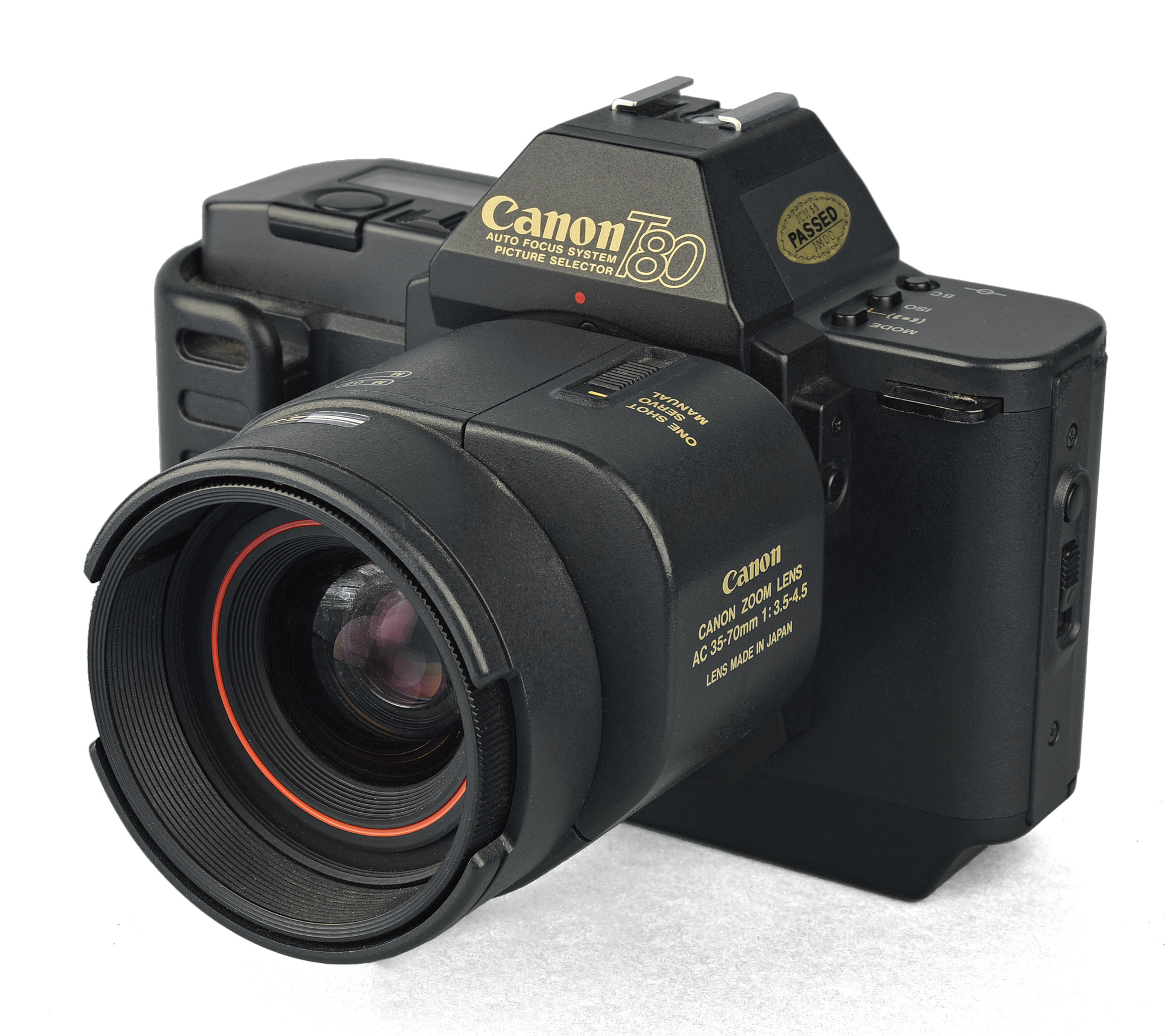
Canon T80 with the 35-70AF lens

The Canon T80 is Canon's first autofocus 35mm single-lens reflex camera. It was introduced in April 1985 and discontinued in June 1986 and is part of the T series of FD mount cameras. It is not compatible with Canon's later EOS system and its autofocus EF-mount lenses. Three special autofocus lenses, designated AC, were produced specifically for the camera. Other FD-mount lenses can also be used, but without autofocus capabilities.

== Autofocus ==
The autofocus system in the T80 works in the same manner as the focus assist system built into the earlier AL-1. A linear CCD is used to detect contrast in the focus area. When this area has the maximum contrast, the lens is in focus. This is a similar mechanism to that used in compact digital cameras. When a manual focus lens is used, the camera provides focus assistance in exactly the same manner as the AL-1.

The autofocus lenses contain a motor, and electrical contacts in the lens mount connect this motor to the camera's circuits.

== Auto exposure and scene modes ==
Except for its autofocus capability, the T80 is very similar to the earlier T70, with four programmed scene modes in addition to regular Program auto-exposure (AE). These are:

- Deep Focus – the camera chooses a narrow aperture in order to get more depth of field. Useful for landscapes, or other situations when the photographer needs to get everything in reasonable focus. Trades off against a slow shutter speed.
- Shallow Focus – the camera chooses a wide aperture to get a shallow depth of field. Useful for portraiture, to reduce background distractions.
- Stop Action – the camera chooses a fast shutter speed so that movement is stopped. Useful for sports, wildlife, children etc.
- Flowing – the camera chooses a longer shutter speed for deliberate motion or panning blur.
- Program – the camera has more freedom of choice. Tends to prefer reasonably quick shutter speeds for minimal blurring.

== Film transport ==
Film transport in the T80 is completely automatic, just as in the T70, in both directions. This leaves the top of the camera very clean, since there is no advance lever or rewind knob. Film loading is automatic; the user only has to align the film leader with an orange mark and close the back, and the camera loads and advances the film automatically. Indicators on the top LCD the status of loading, winding and rewinding. The motor, and the camera's other functions including the focusing motor in the lens, are powered by 4 AAA batteries housed in the base of the camera.

== AC lenses ==
Three special autofocus AC lenses were produced for the T80. Each lens contains a motor to focus, unlike the body-integral AF system pioneered by Minolta. All are readily identifiable by a boxy area on the upper left (viewed from the camera) containing the motor, and a red ring around the front lens element. The lenses are:

- AC 50mm f/1.8
- AC 35-70mm f/3.5-4.5
- AC 75-200mm f/4.5

All three, like the T80 itself, were only produced for a short time and are rare. The auto-focus function does not work on any other camera, although they can be used as manual-focus FD lenses. However they lack aperture rings, so they are only useful on FD camera bodies that could control the aperture from the body.

There is one other Canon FD autofocus lens, the Canon New FD 35-70 mm f/4 AF. This was introduced in 1981, and uses a similar autofocus system to the T80's lenses, with an integral autofocus motor. The lens has a self-contained autofocus system that does not require autofocus electronics in the camera body.

Canon, unlike Minolta and Nikon, was convinced that having the motor in the lens was the optimal approach; this line of thinking continued with the new EOS system in 1987, which remains Canon's standard mounting system for SLRs today.

== Data back ==
A Command Back 80 was available for the T80. Like the similar back available for the T90, it supports date stamping of images, alphanumeric coding of images, time exposures and time-lapse interval exposure.

== See also ==
- Canon AC Mount

	1971	1972	1973	1974	1975	1976	1977	1978	1979	1980	1981	1982	1983	1984	1985	1986	1987	1988	1989	1990	1991	1992	1993
Professional																T90							
Professional		F-1 High Speed Motor Drive Camera												New F-1 High Speed Motor Drive Camera									
Professional	F-1						F-1N / F-1 (Later Model)					New F-1											
Amateur				EF					A-1														
Amateur															T70								
Amateur	FTb			FTb-N			AE-1					AE-1 Program											
Amateur					TLb					AV-1			AL-1			T80							
Amateur					TX		AT-1							T50							T60		
