= FE10 =

FE10 may refer to:

== Video games ==
- Fire Emblem: Radiant Dawn, the tenth game in the Fire Emblem series

== Photography ==
- Nikon FE10, an SLR camera manufactured by Nikon as an electronic variant of the Nikon FM10
