= Panasonic Lumix DMC-G5 =

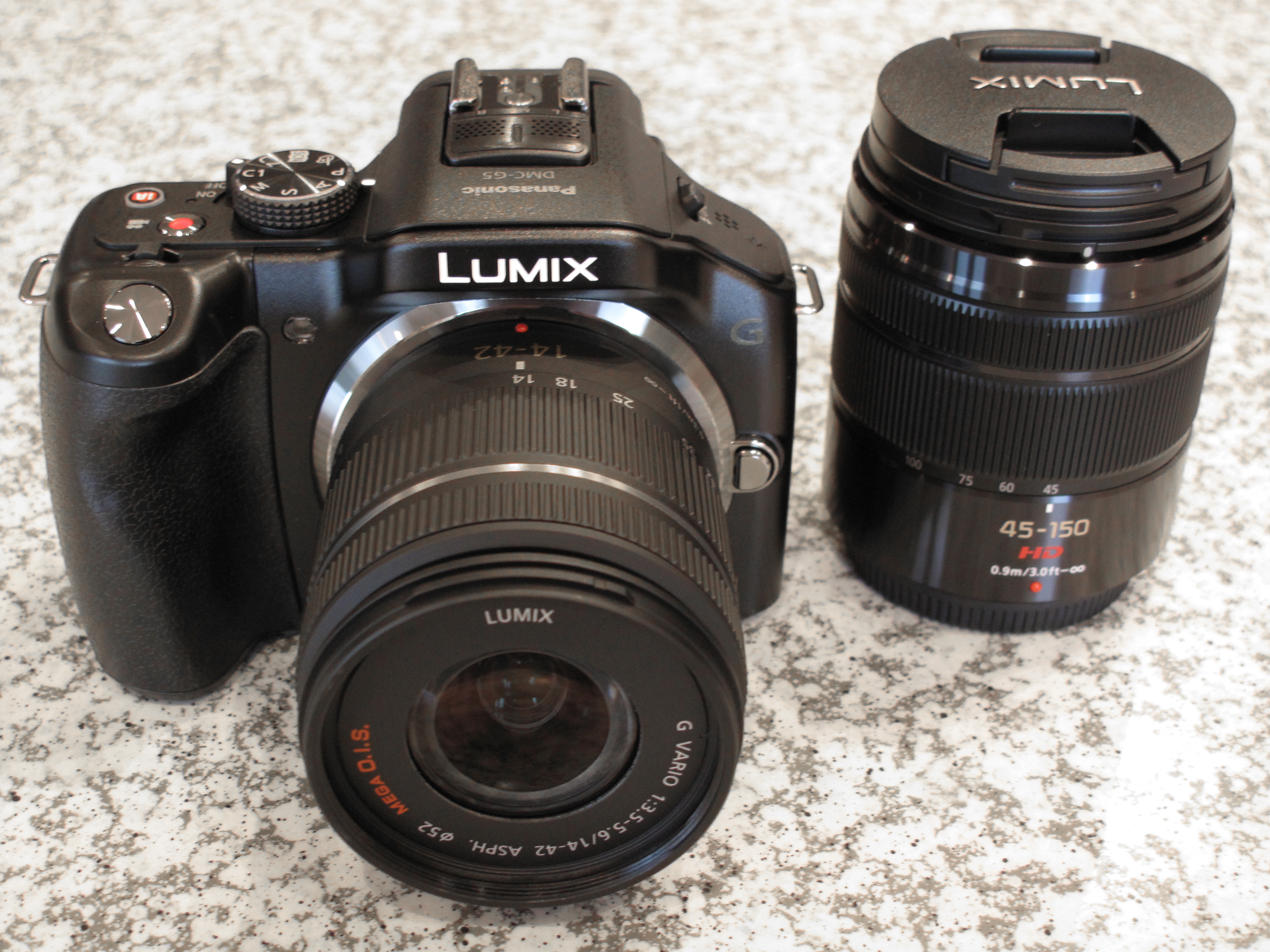
- Panasonic DMC-G5, with 14-42mm and 45-150mm lenses

Overview
- Maker: Panasonic Holdings Corporation
- Type: Micro Four Thirds System

Lens
- Lens mount: Micro Four Thirds system
- Lens: Micro Four Thirds System mount

Sensor/medium
- Sensor: 17.3 × 13.0 mm Live MOS
- Maximum resolution: 4592 x 3448 (16.7 megapixels, 16.0 mp effective) 4:3 native; 3:2, 16:9, 1:1 image format(cropped from 4:3 native image format)
- Film speed: ISO 160–12800

Focusing
- Focus modes: Automatic or Manual

Exposure/metering
- Exposure modes: Manual, Program, Automatic, Shutter Priority, Aperture Priority
- Exposure metering: Intelligent Multiple (Center weighted, average and spot)

Shutter
- Shutter: focal-plane
- Shutter speed range: 60–1/4000 sec

General
- Weight: 346 g (12 oz)

The Panasonic Lumix DMC-G5 is a digital mirrorless interchangeable lens camera that adheres to the joint Olympus and Panasonic Micro Four Thirds System (MFT system) design standard. It is identified as the twelfth Panasonic MFT camera introduced under the standard and the nineteenth model MFT camera introduced by either Olympus or Panasonic.

The G5 includes HD video recording capability in AVCHD format. The G5 is the successor to the Panasonic Lumix DMC-G3 and is Panasonic's most junior MFT camera.

The G5 differs from the G3 principally by offering a higher maximum ISO (12,800 vs 6,400), a continuous shooting frame rate (6 vs 4 fps), a higher resolution screen, and a new image sensor and processor.

Physically, the G5 is very similar to the Panasonic Lumix DMC-G3, but it has a larger hand grip. However, most of the camera's functionality is also accessible through the touch-control LCD panel.

Preceded by Panasonic Lumix DMC-G3	Panasonic Micro Four Thirds System cameras October 2008–present	Succeeded by Panasonic Lumix DMC-G6

Brand	Form	Class	2008	2009	2010	2011			2012	2013	2014	2015	2016	2017	2018	2019	2020	2021	2022	2023	2024	2025	2026
Olympus	SLR style OM-D	Professional															E-M1X ^{R}						
Olympus	SLR style OM-D	High-end									E-M1			E-M1 II ^{R}			E-M1 III ^{R}						
Olympus	SLR style OM-D	Advanced							E-M5			E-M5 II ^{R}					E-M5 III ^{R}						
Olympus	SLR style OM-D	Mid-range									E-M10		E-M10 II		E-M10 III			E-M10 IV					
Olympus	Rangefinder style PEN	Mid-range		E-P1	E-P2		E-P3				E-P5		PEN-F ^{R}										
Olympus	Rangefinder style PEN	Upper-entry			E-PL1	E-PL2		E-PL3	E-PL5		E-PL6	E-PL7		E-PL8	E-PL9		E-PL10						
Olympus	Rangefinder style PEN	Entry-level					E-PM1		E-PM2														
Olympus	remote													Air									
OM System	SLR style	Professional																	OM-1 ^{R}		OM-1 II ^{R}		
OM System	SLR style	High-end																				OM-3 ^{R}	
OM System	SLR style	Advanced																		OM-5 ^{R}			OM-5 II ^{R}
OM System	PEN	Mid-range																	E-P7				
Panasonic	SLR style	High-end Video													GH5S				GH6 ^{R}			GH7 ^{R}	
Panasonic	SLR style	High-end Photo													G9 ^{R}						G9 II ^{R}		
Panasonic	SLR style	High-end		GH1		GH2			GH3		GH4				GH5				GH5II				
Panasonic	SLR style	Mid-range		G1	G2		G3		G5		G6		G7	G80/G85			G90/G95						
Panasonic	SLR style	Entry-level			G10													G100			G100D		
Panasonic	Rangefinder style	Advanced							GX1		GX7		GX8		GX9								
Panasonic	Rangefinder style	Mid-range									GM1	GM5	GX80/GX85										
Panasonic	Rangefinder style	Entry-level			GF1	GF2	GF3		GF5		GF6	GF7	GF8	GX800/GX850/GF9		GX880/GF10/GF90							
Panasonic	Camcorder	Professional							AG-AF104														
Kodak	Rangefinder style	Entry-level										S-1											
DJI	Drone	.												Zenmuse X5S									
DJI	Drone	.												Zenmuse X5									
YI	Rangefinder style	Entry-level												M1									
Yongnuo	Rangefinder style	Android camera															YN450M		YN455				
Blackmagic Design	Rangefinder style	High-End Video							Cinema Camera														
Blackmagic Design	Rangefinder style	High-End Video									Pocket Cinema Camera					Pocket Cinema Camera 4K							
Blackmagic Design		High-End Video										Micro Cinema Camera									Micro Studio Camera 4K G2		
Z CAM	Cinema	Advanced											E1			E2							
Z CAM	Cinema	Mid-Range																E2-M4					
Z CAM	Cinema	Entry-Level															E2C						
JVC	Camcorder	Professional										GY-LS300											
SVS-Vistek		Industrial							EVO Tracer														
