= Panasonic Lumix DMC-G2 =

Digital camera model

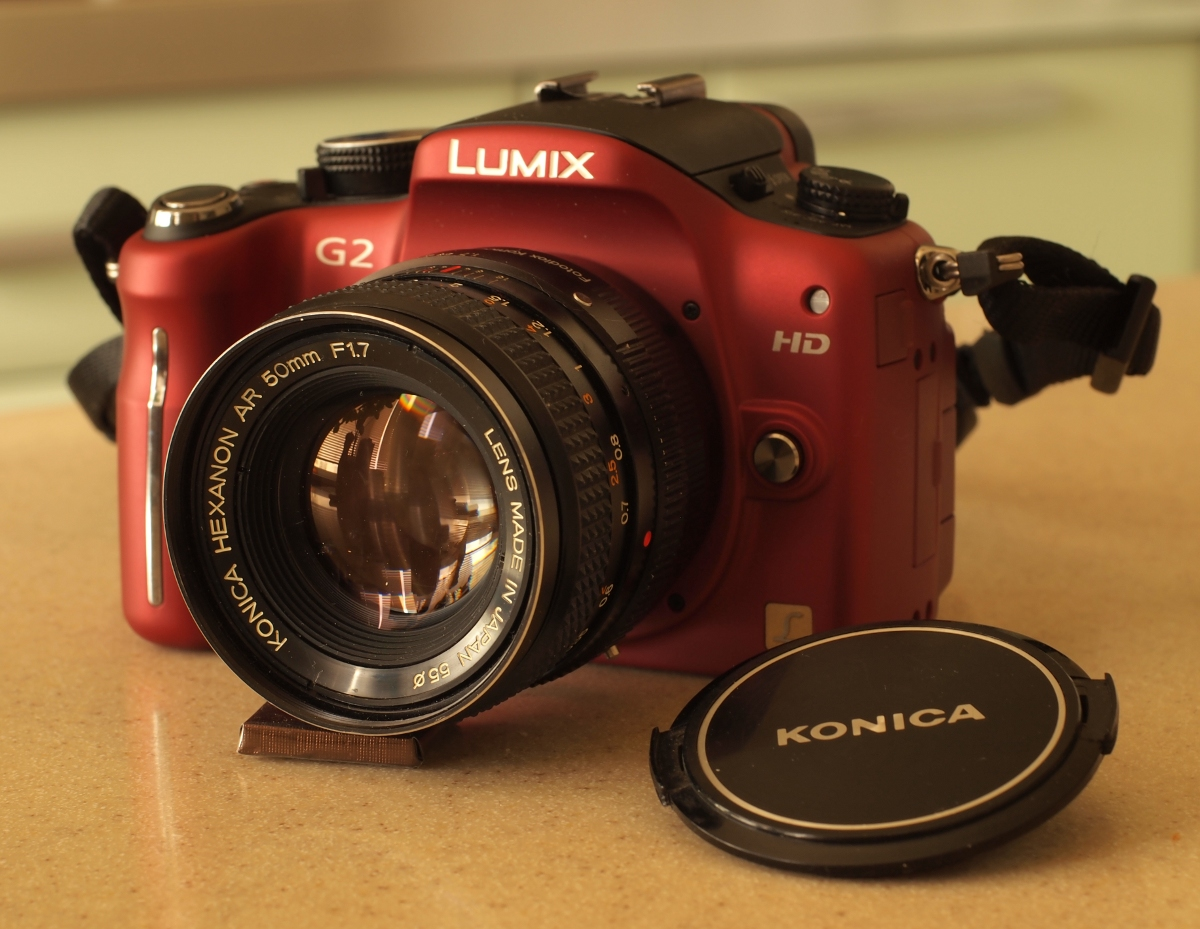
- Panasonic DMC-G2 + Konica Hexanon 50 F1.7

Overview
- Maker: Panasonic Holdings Corporation
- Type: Micro Four Thirds System
- Released: March 2010

Lens
- Lens: Micro Four Thirds System mount

Sensor/medium
- Sensor: 17.3 × 13 mm Live MOS
- Maximum resolution: 4000×3000 (12 megapixels); 4:3, 3:2, 16:9, 1:1 image format
- Film speed: ISO 100–6400
- Storage media: SD, SDHC

Focusing
- Focus modes: Automatic or Manual Face detection / AF Tracking / 23-area-focusing / 1-area-focusing Touch (1-area-focusing in Face detection / AF Tracking / Multi-area-focusing / 1-area-focusing)

Exposure/metering
- Exposure modes: Manual, Program, Automatic, Shutter Priority, Aperture Priority
- Exposure metering: Intelligent Multiple (Center weighted, average and spot)

Flash
- Flash: Built-in-Flash, TTL, GN 11 equivalent (ISO100 · m)
- Flash bracketing: ±3.0 EV in ⅓ EV steps 3,5,7 frames* • 1/3 or 2/3, +/−2.0 EV steps

Shutter
- Shutter speed range: 60–1/4000 sec

Viewfinder
- Viewfinder: EVF color display, 100% field of view, 0.7x (35mm equiv), 1.4x magnification, with 1,440K dots equivalent; LCD or articulated multi-angle 3-inch (76 mm) inch color LCD (460,000 dots equivalent)

Image processing
- White balance: custom modes

General
- Battery: Li-Ion 7.2 V, 1250 mAh
- Weight: body+battery 428 g; 14–42 mm zoom lens 165 g

The Panasonic Lumix DMC-G2 is a digital mirrorless interchangeable lens camera that adheres to the Micro Four Thirds System (MFT) design standard developed by Olympus and Panasonic. It was announced by Panasonic in March 2010 along with the Lumix DMC-G10. The G2 was introduced as the successor to the Lumix DMC-G1 camera, with upgrades such as 720p high-definition video recording capability in AVCHD Lite and Motion JPEG formats.

Key features of the G2 include a touchscreen interface that allows control of many camera functions including touch-based selection of focus points within the live view frame. This duplicating the control options provided by the physical dials and buttons on the camera body. The G2 was sold with a redesigned 14-42mm Panasonic kit lens that was lighter and less expensive than the 14-45mm lens included with the G1.

At launch, the suggested retail price for the Panasonic Lumix DMC-G2 with 14-42mm lens kit was US$800 in the United States market. It was available in black, red and blue color options.

== The Micro Four Thirds system ==
The Micro Four Thirds (MFT) system is a camera design standard jointly developed and announced in 2008 by Olympus and Panasonic as an evolution of their previous Four Thirds System. Like the Four Thirds System, it uses a 4000 x 3000 pixel sensor, but in a more compact camera body design enabled by eliminating the reflex mirror and optical viewfinder.

A key advantage of the smaller MFT sensor is that it allows for more compact and lightweight native lens designs compared to larger APS-C and full frame sensors used by Canon, Nikon and others. The smaller image circle of MFT lenses also enables slimmer camera bodies. The 2X crop factor of the MFT sensor compared to 35mm full frame means that lenses can be designed smaller and lighter for any given angle of view. For example, a typical MFT 14-42mm f/3.5-5.6 kit lens weighs 112g and measures 50mm long, while an equivalent Canon APS-C 18-55mm f/3.5-5.6 kit lens weighs 190g and is 80mm long.

Unlike the Four Thirds System which was optimized for DSLR designs with a mirror box and optical viewfinder, the MFT standard pursues a mirrorless approach. MFT cameras use an electronic viewfinder or LCD screen for live view, eliminating the complex optical path required for an optical viewfinder. This enables more compact camera bodies and lenses. The MFT standard is also designed for seamless switching between stills and HD video recording.

The short 20mm flange focal distance of MFT cameras, compared to over 40mm for most DSLRs, allows virtually any existing interchangeable lens to be mounted via an adapter, albeit with only manual focus and aperture control. This means legacy 35mm film lenses and lenses for larger format cameras can gain a second life on MFT bodies, providing high quality optics at low cost. The 2X crop of MFT effectively turns a 50mm full frame "standard" lens into a 100mm portrait telephoto lens.

== Panasonic Lumix DMC-G2 features ==
Upon introduction in March 2010, the Panasonic Lumix DMC-G2 was marketed as the world's first interchangeable lens camera with an articulated, touch control LCD. Also added was 720p HD video and a redesigned physical user interface, changing placement of dials and button controllers, and an electronic viewfinder. Notably, the G2 was not capable of full 1080p HD video as was the then top-of-the-line Panasonic GH1. The ability to choose the focus point by touching the desired area on the screen was implemented in all Panasonic MFT cameras introduced after the G2. Other manufacturers such as Sony with its new NEX family of cameras, and Olympus in its PEN E-P3 MFT camera also incorporated use of the touch screen feature for camera controls.

The "new" 14-42mm kit zoom lens was less expensive than the original optical image stabilized 14-45mm f/3.5-5.6 kit zoom lens that came with the G1. The 14-42mm kit lens is lighter, but longer than the original 14-45mm kit lens, features a plastic, rather than metal lens mount, and omits on-off switch for the in lens optical image stabilization system. However, the 14-42mm optical image stabilization system on-off could be controlled through camera menus. Many enthusiasts regard the 14-42mm kit lens as a step down in both optical image quality and build quality from the original 14-45mm kit lens.

=== Body colors and MSRP ===
The camera is available in three colors — black (suffix K), red (R) and blue (B). MSRP in the United States for the body and 14-42mm kit zoom lens was US$800.00.

=== Successor model ===
The G2 camera's successor model is the Panasonic Lumix DMC-G3 which was announced in May 2011.

== Video recording formats ==
=== AVCHD Lite Format (.MTS files) ===
Menu designation	Aspect ratio	Resolution	Frame rate	Bit rate
NTSC HD	16:9	720p 1280 × 720	60p (sensor output is 30 fps) (60p done with frame dup)	SH: 17, H: 13, L: 9 Mbit/s
PAL HD	16:9	720p 1280 × 720	50p (sensor output is 25 fps) (50p done with frame dup)	SH: 17, H: 13, L: 9 Mbit/s

=== M-JPEG Format (.MOV files) ===
Menu designation	Aspect ratio	Resolution	Frame rate	Bit rate
HD	16:9	1280 × 720	30 frame/s	~8 MB/s
WVGA	16:9	848 × 480	30 frame/s	~3.5 MB/s
VGA	4:3	640 × 480	30 frame/s	~2.7 MB/s
QVGA	4:3	320 × 240	30 frame/s	~0.7 MB/s

Preceded by Panasonic Lumix DMC-G1	Panasonic Micro Four Thirds System cameras November 2008–present	Succeeded by Panasonic Lumix DMC-G3

Brand	Form	Class	2008	2009	2010	2011			2012	2013	2014	2015	2016	2017	2018	2019	2020	2021	2022	2023	2024	2025	2026
Olympus	SLR style OM-D	Professional															E-M1X ^{R}						
Olympus	SLR style OM-D	High-end									E-M1			E-M1 II ^{R}			E-M1 III ^{R}						
Olympus	SLR style OM-D	Advanced							E-M5			E-M5 II ^{R}					E-M5 III ^{R}						
Olympus	SLR style OM-D	Mid-range									E-M10		E-M10 II		E-M10 III			E-M10 IV					
Olympus	Rangefinder style PEN	Mid-range		E-P1	E-P2		E-P3				E-P5		PEN-F ^{R}										
Olympus	Rangefinder style PEN	Upper-entry			E-PL1	E-PL2		E-PL3	E-PL5		E-PL6	E-PL7		E-PL8	E-PL9		E-PL10						
Olympus	Rangefinder style PEN	Entry-level					E-PM1		E-PM2														
Olympus	remote													Air									
OM System	SLR style	Professional																	OM-1 ^{R}		OM-1 II ^{R}		
OM System	SLR style	High-end																				OM-3 ^{R}	
OM System	SLR style	Advanced																		OM-5 ^{R}			OM-5 II ^{R}
OM System	PEN	Mid-range																	E-P7				
Panasonic	SLR style	High-end Video													GH5S				GH6 ^{R}			GH7 ^{R}	
Panasonic	SLR style	High-end Photo													G9 ^{R}						G9 II ^{R}		
Panasonic	SLR style	High-end		GH1		GH2			GH3		GH4				GH5				GH5II				
Panasonic	SLR style	Mid-range		G1	G2		G3		G5		G6		G7	G80/G85			G90/G95						
Panasonic	SLR style	Entry-level			G10													G100			G100D		
Panasonic	Rangefinder style	Advanced							GX1		GX7		GX8		GX9								
Panasonic	Rangefinder style	Mid-range									GM1	GM5	GX80/GX85										
Panasonic	Rangefinder style	Entry-level			GF1	GF2	GF3		GF5		GF6	GF7	GF8	GX800/GX850/GF9		GX880/GF10/GF90							
Panasonic	Camcorder	Professional							AG-AF104														
Kodak	Rangefinder style	Entry-level										S-1											
DJI	Drone	.												Zenmuse X5S									
DJI	Drone	.												Zenmuse X5									
YI	Rangefinder style	Entry-level												M1									
Yongnuo	Rangefinder style	Android camera															YN450M		YN455				
Blackmagic Design	Rangefinder style	High-End Video							Cinema Camera														
Blackmagic Design	Rangefinder style	High-End Video									Pocket Cinema Camera					Pocket Cinema Camera 4K							
Blackmagic Design		High-End Video										Micro Cinema Camera									Micro Studio Camera 4K G2		
Z CAM	Cinema	Advanced											E1			E2							
Z CAM	Cinema	Mid-Range																E2-M4					
Z CAM	Cinema	Entry-Level															E2C						
JVC	Camcorder	Professional										GY-LS300											
SVS-Vistek		Industrial							EVO Tracer														
