= Canon AC mount =

Variation of the Canon FD lens mount for autofocus

The Canon AC lens-mount was a proprietary lens mount for the Canon T80. The lens mount was a variation of the then-standard Canon FD for auto-focus.

== See also ==
- Canon New FD 35-70 mm f/4 AF
