= FM10 =

FM10 may refer to:

- Nikon FM10, a camera
- Farm to Market Road 10, in Texas
- Football Manager 2010, a video game
- Volvo FM10, a heavy truck
