= Canon T60 =

1990 35mm single-lens reflex camera

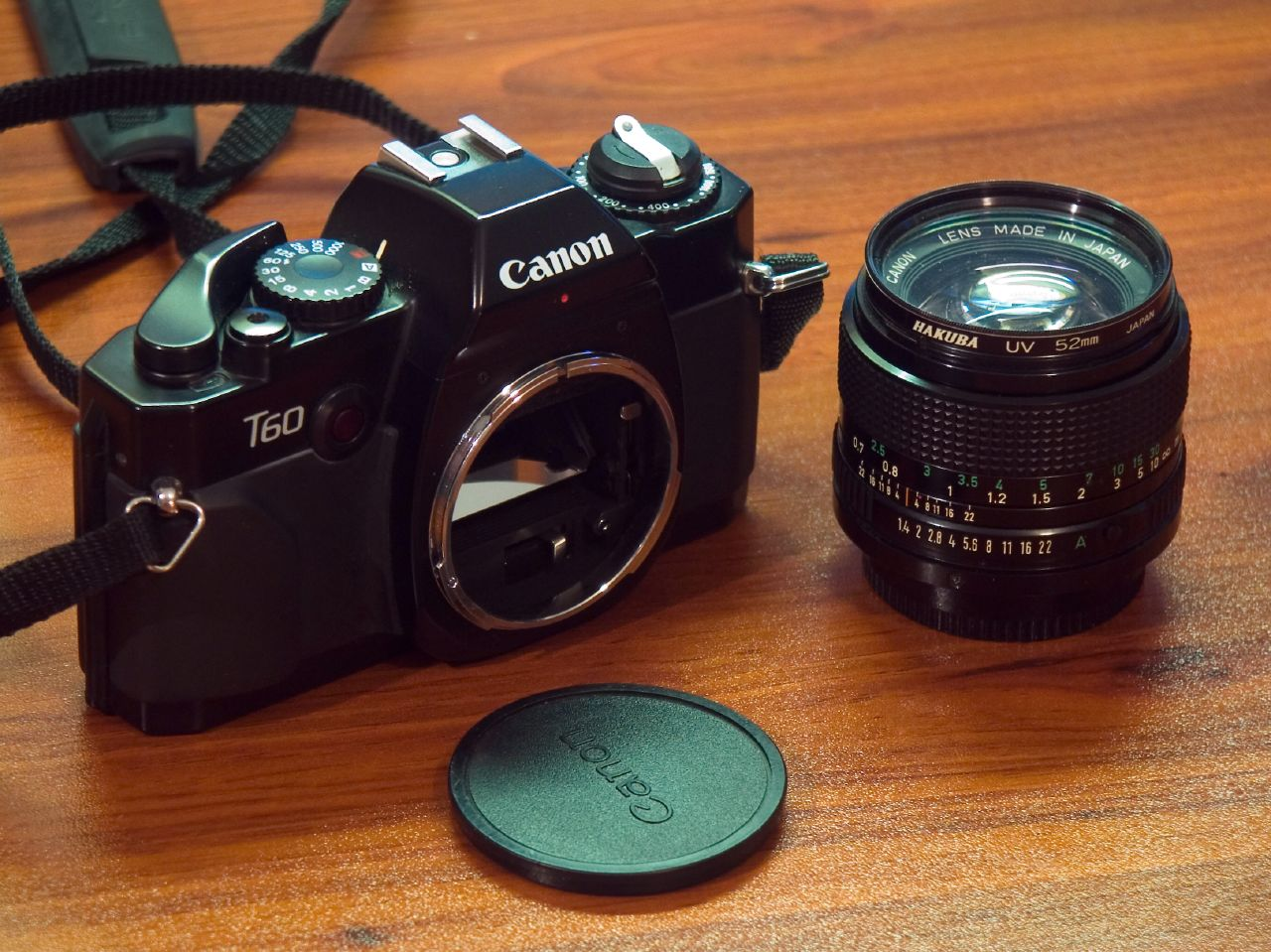
Canon T60.

The Canon T60 was the last manual focus FD-mount 35 mm single-lens reflex (SLR) camera sold by Canon; it was introduced in 1990, three years after the introduction of Canon's incompatible EOS system of autofocus SLRs and their EF lenses. It was the final camera in Canon's T series.

It was introduced solely as a cheap SLR system for export. It was never sold in Canon's home Japanese market. In some foreign markets, the higher price of the EOS cameras was a problem, while in others, there was demand for a cheap, largely manual camera for photography students and the like.

The T60 shared little with the other T-series models except for a superficial styling resemblance. Unlike them, it had only manual film loading, advance and rewind. Film speed and shutter speed were set with traditional dials.

The only auto-exposure mode supported was aperture priority AE. The camera would choose an appropriate shutter speed. Also supported, of course, was full manual exposure, aided by the camera's built-in meter. Shutter speed range was 1/1000 to 1 second, plus bulb.

Canon did not manufacture the T60. Like a number of other low-end bodies sold by major camera companies (such as the Nikon FM10 and Olympus OM2000), it was both built by Cosina, and based upon Cosina's own CT-1 chassis. (Cosina subcontracted work for many other Japanese photographic firms as well as producing cameras to their own design.)

	1971	1972	1973	1974	1975	1976	1977	1978	1979	1980	1981	1982	1983	1984	1985	1986	1987	1988	1989	1990	1991	1992	1993
Professional																T90							
Professional		F-1 High Speed Motor Drive Camera												New F-1 High Speed Motor Drive Camera									
Professional	F-1						F-1N / F-1 (Later Model)					New F-1											
Amateur				EF					A-1														
Amateur															T70								
Amateur	FTb			FTb-N			AE-1					AE-1 Program											
Amateur					TLb					AV-1			AL-1			T80							
Amateur					TX		AT-1							T50							T60		
