= Panasonic Lumix DMC-G3 =

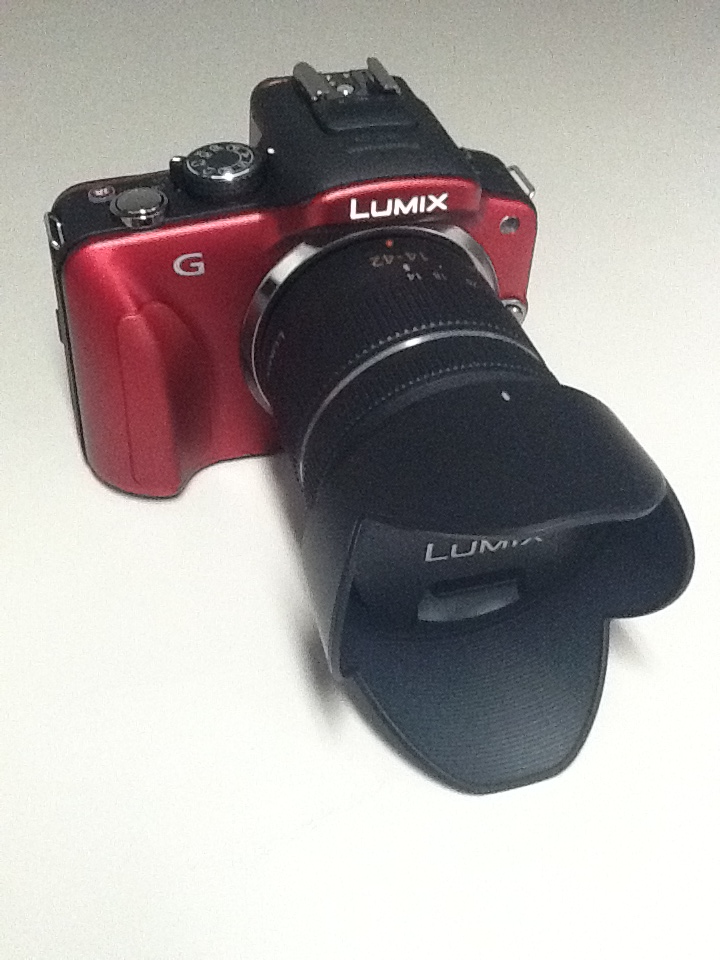
- Panasonic DMC-G3, with 14-42mm lens

Overview
- Maker: Panasonic Holdings Corporation
- Type: Micro Four Thirds System

Lens
- Lens mount: Micro Four Thirds system
- Lens: Micro Four Thirds System mount

Sensor/medium
- Sensor: 17.3 × 13.0 mm Live MOS
- Maximum resolution: 4592 x 3448 (15.83 megapixels) 4:3 native; 3:2, 16:9, 1:1 image format (cropped from 4:3 native image format)
- Film speed: ISO 160–6400
- Storage media: SD, SDHC

Focusing
- Focus modes: Automatic or Manual

Exposure/metering
- Exposure modes: Manual, Program, Automatic, Shutter Priority, Aperture Priority
- Exposure metering: Intelligent Multiple (Center weighted, average and spot)

Flash
- Flash: Built-in pop up, GN 10.5m (ISO 160)
- Flash bracketing: ±2.0 EV in ⅓ EV steps 3,5,7 frames* • 1/3 or 2/3, +/−2.0 EV steps

Shutter
- Shutter: focal-plane
- Shutter speed range: 60–1/4000 sec

Viewfinder
- Viewfinder: EVF color display, 100% field of view, 0.7× (35mm equiv), 1.4× magnification, with 1.44M dots equivalent; LCD or articulated multi-angle 3-inch (76 mm) inch color LCD (460,000 dots equivalent)

Image processing
- White balance: custom modes

General
- Battery: Li-Ion 7.2 V, 1010 mAh
- Weight: body 336 g; with 14–42 mm lens, battery and card 558 g

The Panasonic Lumix DMC-G3 is a digital mirrorless interchangeable lens camera adhering to the joint Olympus and Panasonic Micro Four Thirds System (MFT) system design standard. The Panasonic Lumix DMC-G3 is the eighth Panasonic MFT camera introduced under the standard and the thirteenth model MFT camera introduced by either Olympus or Panasonic, as of the G3 product announcement date.

The G3 includes full HD video recording capability in AVCHD format in accordance with the MFT system design standard. The G3 is not the successor to the Panasonic Lumix DMC-G2 but is sold alongside it, placing the G2 in the entry-level position that the now-discontinued G10 once occupied. The G series cameras are designed primarily for users interested in still photography, with the more expensive GH series geared towards users who are interested in greater video functionality. Significantly, the G3 design departs from previous G-series designs with a smaller size, new sensor design and increased processing power.

Physically, the G3 approximates the size of the small Panasonic Lumix DMC-GF2, but includes an electronic viewfinder (EVF) and an articulated, touch control-enabled LCD panel. This made the G3, upon its introduction, the smallest available MFT camera with a built-in EVF, 25% smaller than the G2. The G3's smaller physical size limits the space available for manual control buttons and dials, with many functions now controllable through the articulated 3-inch (76 mm) LCD touch panel on the camera back.

The G3 has a 15.83 megapixel sensor derived from the one in the top-of-the-line Panasonic Lumix DMC-GH2. This is an improvement over the previous 12.1 megapixel four thirds sensors used by other Olympus and Panasonic MFT cameras, with the exception of the unique multi-aspect sensors used on the Panasonic Lumix DMC-GH1 and GH2 hybrid video/still MFT cameras.

The G3 has faster Auto focus speed than most previous Panasonic MFT cameras. Panasonic claims that it possesses a revised JPEG engine which reputedly renders more pleasing colours (e.g., skin tones), with higher image quality and lower noise at higher ISO than any of the previous Panasonic cameras, with the possible exception of the GH2. However, some reviewers have criticised the quality of the G3s JPEG files.

At the center top of the G3 there are weak built-in pop up flash with GN10.5 at ISO160 (GN8.3 at ISO100), hot shoe and stereo microphone (G2 still monoaural). The G3 lacks the external microphone input that the older G2 does.

The G3 was announced in May 2011, and started shipping in June 2011. Available colors, depending on market, were black, chocolate brown, red and white. In the United States, the suggested MSRP for the camera and 14-42mm kit lens was US$700.00 and GBP628.99 in the United Kingdom

== Micro four thirds system ==
The Micro Four Thirds (MFT) system design standard was jointly announced in 2008 by Olympus and Panasonic, as a further evolution of the similarly named predecessor Four Thirds System pioneered by Olympus. The Micro Four Thirds system standard uses the same sized sensor as the original Four Thirds system, which is half the size of a 35mm camera sensor. One advantage of the smaller sensor is smaller and lighter lenses, but one disadvantage is lower image quality. For example, a typical Olympus MFT M.Zuiko 14-42mm f/3.5-5.6 kit lens weighs 112g, is 56mm in diameter and 50mm in length. The equivalent Canon APS-C DSLR EF-S 18-55mm f3.5-5.6 kit lens weighs 190g, and is 69mm in diameter and 80mm in length In 35mm camera format the Micro Four Thirds system sensor has a 2× magnification factor on its lenses whereas the APS-C sized sensor cameras have 1.6× magnification factor.

While the older Four Thirds system design standard allowed the incorporation of a single lens reflex (SLR) camera design including a mirror box and pentaprism based optical viewfinder system, the MFT system design standard sought to pursue a technically different camera, and specifically slimmed down the key physical specifications which eliminated the ability to include the traditional complex optical path and the bulky mirror box needed for a SLR optical viewfinder. Instead, MFT uses either a built-in (Panasonic) or optional (Olympus/Panasonic) compact electronic viewfinder (EVF) and/or LCD back panel displaying a Live view from the main image sensor. Use of an EVF/back panel LCD and smaller four thirds image sensor format and allows for smaller and lighter camera bodies and lenses. The MFT system offers better video recording functionality than traditional DSLRs.

MFT cameras are physically slimmer than most interchangeable lens cameras because the standard specifies a much reduced lens mount flange to imaging sensor plane distance of 20mm. Typically this so-called flange focal distance is over 40mm on most interchangeable lens cameras. The MFT system design flange focal length distance allows for, through use of an adapter, the possibility to mount virtually any manufacturer's existing and legacy still camera interchangeable lens (as well as some video and cine lenses) to an MFT body, albeit using manual focus and manual aperture control. For example, many theoretically obsolete 35mm film camera lenses, as well as existing current lenses for APS-C and full frame DSLR's are now usable on MFT cameras.

== Firmware ==
Panasonic has announced the following firmware update

Version	Release date	Notes
1.1	October 2011	Compatibility update for new Panasonic X class lenses with power zoom feature.: 1. Display of the local length When you zoom, the focal distance is displayed and you can confirm the zoom position.; 2. Step zoom When you operate the zoom, the zoom will stop at positions corresponding to predetermined distances.; 3. Zoom resume When you switch the power switch [ON], the zoom positions when you last switched [OFF] are automatically restored.; 4. Selectable zoom speed Users can select the speed of electric-powered zooming.
1.2	2011-10-12	Enhances the operation of Micro Four Thirds Lens, when coupled via a v1.1 mount adapter. The update adds a POWER ZOOM LENS option to the CUSTOM menu, with the following sub-options:- DISP FOCAL LENGTH (On/Off), STEP ZOOM (On/Off), ZOOM RESUME (On/Off), ZOOM SPEED (H/M/L), ZOOM RING (On/Off))

== Recording formats ==
=== Still photography ===
Recording File Format	Image Quality	Aspect Ratio	Image Size
JPEG (DCF, Exif 2.3); RAW; DPOF compatible MPO (When attaching 3D lens in Micro Four Thirds System standard)	RAW; RAW+Fine; RAW+Standard; Fine; Standard; MPO+Fine; MPO+Standard (When attaching 3D lens in Micro Four Thirds System standard)	4:3	4,592 x 3,448 (L) [16M] 3,232 x 2,424 (M) [8M] 2,272 x 1,704 (S) [4M] 1,824 x 1,368 (When attaching 3D lens in Micro Four Thirds System standard)
JPEG (DCF, Exif 2.3); RAW; DPOF compatible MPO (When attaching 3D lens in Micro Four Thirds System standard)	RAW; RAW+Fine; RAW+Standard; Fine; Standard; MPO+Fine; MPO+Standard (When attaching 3D lens in Micro Four Thirds System standard)	3:2	4,576 x 3,056 (L) [14M] 3,232 x 2,160 (M) [7M] 2,272 x 1,520 (S) [3.5M] 1,824 x 1,216 (When attaching 3D lens in Micro Four Thirds System standard)
JPEG (DCF, Exif 2.3); RAW; DPOF compatible MPO (When attaching 3D lens in Micro Four Thirds System standard)	RAW; RAW+Fine; RAW+Standard; Fine; Standard; MPO+Fine; MPO+Standard (When attaching 3D lens in Micro Four Thirds System standard)	16:9	4,576 x 2,576 (L) [11.5M] 3,232 x 1,824(M) [6M] 1,920 x 1,080 (S) [2M] 1,824 x 1,024 (When attaching 3D lens in Micro Four Thirds System standard)
JPEG (DCF, Exif 2.3); RAW; DPOF compatible MPO (When attaching 3D lens in Micro Four Thirds System standard)	RAW; RAW+Fine; RAW+Standard; Fine; Standard; MPO+Fine; MPO+Standard (When attaching 3D lens in Micro Four Thirds System standard)	1:1	3,424 x 3,424 (L) [11.5M] 2,416 x 2,416 (M) [6M] 1,712 x 1,712 (S) [3M] 1,712 x 1,712 (When attaching 3D lens in Micro Four Thirds System standard)

=== Video formats ===
Menu Designation	Aspect Ratio	Resolution	Frame Rate	Bit Rate
NTSC Full HD	16:9	1080i 1920 × 1080	60i (sensor output is 30p)	FSH: 17 Mbit/s
NTSC HD	16:9	720p 1280 x 720	60p (sensor output is 30p) (60p done with frame dup)	H: 13, L: 9 Mbit/s
PAL Full HD	16:9	1080i 1920 × 1080	50i (sensor output is 25p)	FSH: 17 Mbit/s
PALS HD	16:9	720p 1280 x 720	50p (sensor output is 25p) (50p done with frame dup)	H: 13, L: 9 Mbit/s

Menu Designation	Aspect Ratio	Resolution	Frame Rate	Bit Rate
HD	16:9	1280 × 720	30 frame/s	~8 MB/s
WVGA	16:9	848 × 480	30 frame/s	~3.5 MB/s
VGA	4:3	640 × 480	30 frame/s	~2.7 MB/s
QVGA	4:3	320 × 240	30 frame/s	~0.7 MB/s

Preceded by Panasonic Lumix DMC-G2	Panasonic Micro Four Thirds System cameras October 2008–present	Succeeded by Panasonic Lumix DMC-G5

Brand	Form	Class	2008	2009	2010	2011			2012	2013	2014	2015	2016	2017	2018	2019	2020	2021	2022	2023	2024	2025	2026
Olympus	SLR style OM-D	Professional															E-M1X ^{R}						
Olympus	SLR style OM-D	High-end									E-M1			E-M1 II ^{R}			E-M1 III ^{R}						
Olympus	SLR style OM-D	Advanced							E-M5			E-M5 II ^{R}					E-M5 III ^{R}						
Olympus	SLR style OM-D	Mid-range									E-M10		E-M10 II		E-M10 III			E-M10 IV					
Olympus	Rangefinder style PEN	Mid-range		E-P1	E-P2		E-P3				E-P5		PEN-F ^{R}										
Olympus	Rangefinder style PEN	Upper-entry			E-PL1	E-PL2		E-PL3	E-PL5		E-PL6	E-PL7		E-PL8	E-PL9		E-PL10						
Olympus	Rangefinder style PEN	Entry-level					E-PM1		E-PM2														
Olympus	remote													Air									
OM System	SLR style	Professional																	OM-1 ^{R}		OM-1 II ^{R}		
OM System	SLR style	High-end																				OM-3 ^{R}	
OM System	SLR style	Advanced																		OM-5 ^{R}			OM-5 II ^{R}
OM System	PEN	Mid-range																	E-P7				
Panasonic	SLR style	High-end Video													GH5S				GH6 ^{R}			GH7 ^{R}	
Panasonic	SLR style	High-end Photo													G9 ^{R}						G9 II ^{R}		
Panasonic	SLR style	High-end		GH1		GH2			GH3		GH4				GH5				GH5II				
Panasonic	SLR style	Mid-range		G1	G2		G3		G5		G6		G7	G80/G85			G90/G95						
Panasonic	SLR style	Entry-level			G10													G100			G100D		
Panasonic	Rangefinder style	Advanced							GX1		GX7		GX8		GX9								
Panasonic	Rangefinder style	Mid-range									GM1	GM5	GX80/GX85										
Panasonic	Rangefinder style	Entry-level			GF1	GF2	GF3		GF5		GF6	GF7	GF8	GX800/GX850/GF9		GX880/GF10/GF90							
Panasonic	Camcorder	Professional							AG-AF104														
Kodak	Rangefinder style	Entry-level										S-1											
DJI	Drone	.												Zenmuse X5S									
DJI	Drone	.												Zenmuse X5									
YI	Rangefinder style	Entry-level												M1									
Yongnuo	Rangefinder style	Android camera															YN450M		YN455				
Blackmagic Design	Rangefinder style	High-End Video							Cinema Camera														
Blackmagic Design	Rangefinder style	High-End Video									Pocket Cinema Camera					Pocket Cinema Camera 4K							
Blackmagic Design		High-End Video										Micro Cinema Camera									Micro Studio Camera 4K G2		
Z CAM	Cinema	Advanced											E1			E2							
Z CAM	Cinema	Mid-Range																E2-M4					
Z CAM	Cinema	Entry-Level															E2C						
JVC	Camcorder	Professional										GY-LS300											
SVS-Vistek		Industrial							EVO Tracer														
