= Panasonic Lumix DMC-G6 =

2013 digital single-lens reflex camera

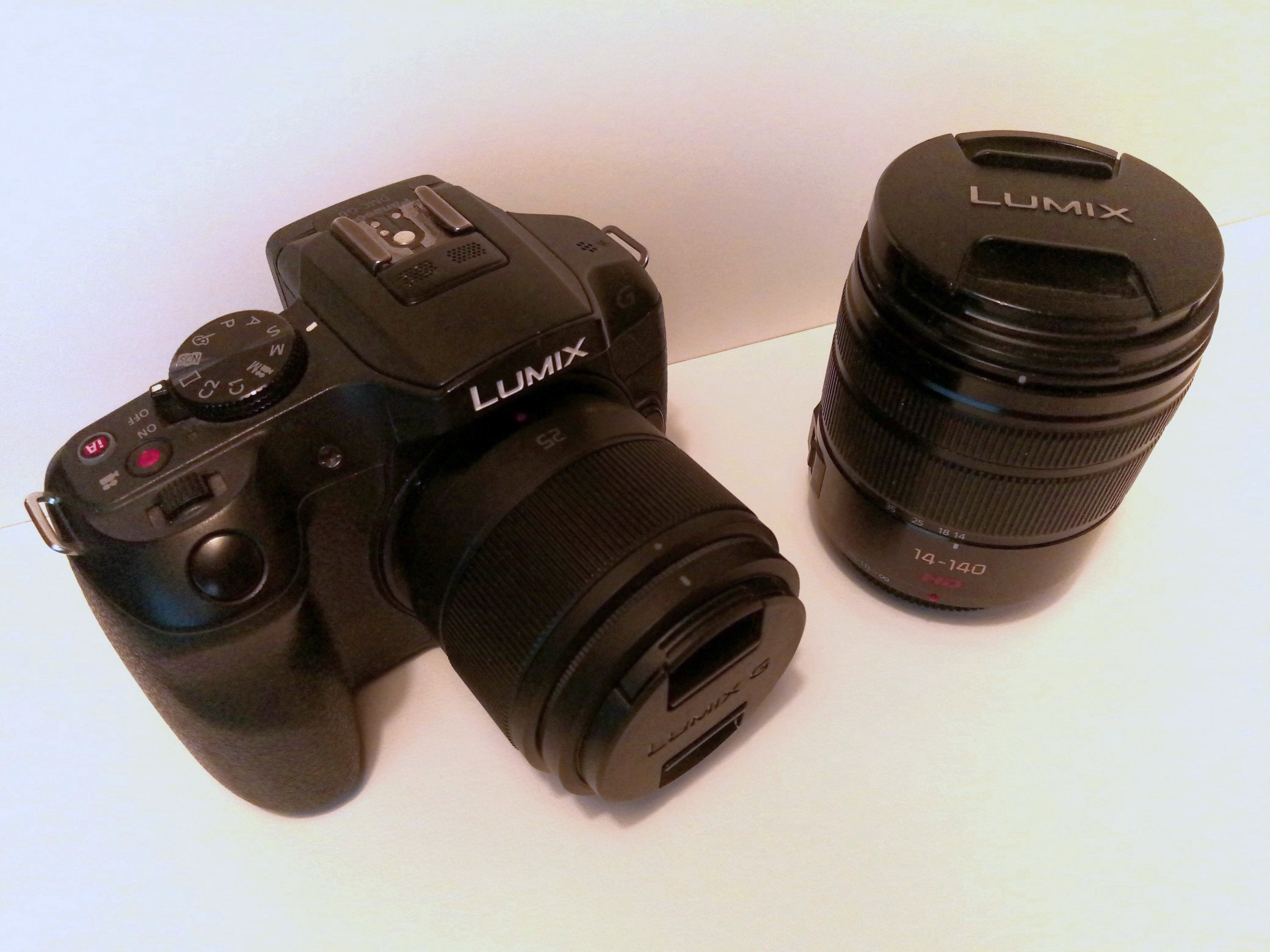

Overview
- Maker: Panasonic Lumix
- Type: CSC

Sensor/medium
- Sensor type: 16.05 megapixels Live MOS
- Sensor size: Micro four thirds
- Film speed: 160-25600
- Storage media: SD, SDHC, SDXC

Focusing
- Focus modes: AFS (Single) / AFF (Flessible) / AFC (Continuous) / MF

Flash
- Flash: built-in

Shutter
- Frame rate: 3 - 7
- Shutter speeds: 1 - 4.000

General
- LCD screen: 3" free angle LCD TFT touch screen
- Battery: Li-ion Battery Pack (7.2V, 1200mAh)
- Dimensions: 12,45 x 84,6 x 71,4 mm
- Weight: 390 g (14 oz) with Battery and SD Memory Card

Panasonic Lumix DMC-G6 is a Micro Four Thirds system camera made by Panasonic Lumix. The model was announced in April 2013. The highest-resolution pictures it can record is 16.05 megapixels and the sensor is a Live MOS The camera is not a direct replacement of the Panasonic Lumix DMC-G5, but set in between the G5 and the Panasonic Lumix DMC-GH3.

The body-only dimension of the Lumix G6 is relatively the same with the smallest and lightest model of DSLR with an APS-C sensor Canon EOS 100D, but the Lumix G6 has smaller lenses. Lumix G6 has also built-in Panorama mode, focus-peaking for video as videocam, interval shooting, time lapse movies, while Canon EOS 100D has not.

== Properties ==
- 16,05 Megapixel Live MOS sensor
- Venus Engine
- Fast Light Speed AF
- OLED LVF (Live View Finder)
- Wi-Fi and NFC for Smartphones
- Creative Panorama and Creative Control with 19 filters

== Successor ==
The Panasonic G7 was announced on May 18, 2015. The camera features 16 MP Live MOS Sensor in combination with Venus Engine 9 Image Processor, with the help of newly developed image processor and the sensor the camera can shoot continuous shots to 8 fps Shooting with AF & ISO 25600. Panasonic G7 also supports 4K video recording at 30/24 fps, Built-In Wi-Fi Connectivity is also there for wireless sharing of files.

Brand	Form	Class	2008	2009	2010	2011			2012	2013	2014	2015	2016	2017	2018	2019	2020	2021	2022	2023	2024	2025	2026
Olympus	SLR style OM-D	Professional															E-M1X ^{R}						
Olympus	SLR style OM-D	High-end									E-M1			E-M1 II ^{R}			E-M1 III ^{R}						
Olympus	SLR style OM-D	Advanced							E-M5			E-M5 II ^{R}					E-M5 III ^{R}						
Olympus	SLR style OM-D	Mid-range									E-M10		E-M10 II		E-M10 III			E-M10 IV					
Olympus	Rangefinder style PEN	Mid-range		E-P1	E-P2		E-P3				E-P5		PEN-F ^{R}										
Olympus	Rangefinder style PEN	Upper-entry			E-PL1	E-PL2		E-PL3	E-PL5		E-PL6	E-PL7		E-PL8	E-PL9		E-PL10						
Olympus	Rangefinder style PEN	Entry-level					E-PM1		E-PM2														
Olympus	remote													Air									
OM System	SLR style	Professional																	OM-1 ^{R}		OM-1 II ^{R}		
OM System	SLR style	High-end																				OM-3 ^{R}	
OM System	SLR style	Advanced																		OM-5 ^{R}			OM-5 II ^{R}
OM System	PEN	Mid-range																	E-P7				
Panasonic	SLR style	High-end Video													GH5S				GH6 ^{R}			GH7 ^{R}	
Panasonic	SLR style	High-end Photo													G9 ^{R}						G9 II ^{R}		
Panasonic	SLR style	High-end		GH1		GH2			GH3		GH4				GH5				GH5II				
Panasonic	SLR style	Mid-range		G1	G2		G3		G5		G6		G7	G80/G85			G90/G95						
Panasonic	SLR style	Entry-level			G10													G100			G100D		
Panasonic	Rangefinder style	Advanced							GX1		GX7		GX8		GX9								
Panasonic	Rangefinder style	Mid-range									GM1	GM5	GX80/GX85										
Panasonic	Rangefinder style	Entry-level			GF1	GF2	GF3		GF5		GF6	GF7	GF8	GX800/GX850/GF9		GX880/GF10/GF90							
Panasonic	Camcorder	Professional							AG-AF104														
Kodak	Rangefinder style	Entry-level										S-1											
DJI	Drone	.												Zenmuse X5S									
DJI	Drone	.												Zenmuse X5									
YI	Rangefinder style	Entry-level												M1									
Yongnuo	Rangefinder style	Android camera															YN450M		YN455				
Blackmagic Design	Rangefinder style	High-End Video							Cinema Camera														
Blackmagic Design	Rangefinder style	High-End Video									Pocket Cinema Camera					Pocket Cinema Camera 4K							
Blackmagic Design		High-End Video										Micro Cinema Camera									Micro Studio Camera 4K G2		
Z CAM	Cinema	Advanced											E1			E2							
Z CAM	Cinema	Mid-Range																E2-M4					
Z CAM	Cinema	Entry-Level															E2C						
JVC	Camcorder	Professional										GY-LS300											
SVS-Vistek		Industrial							EVO Tracer														
