= Canon T90 =

1986 35mm single-lens reflex camera

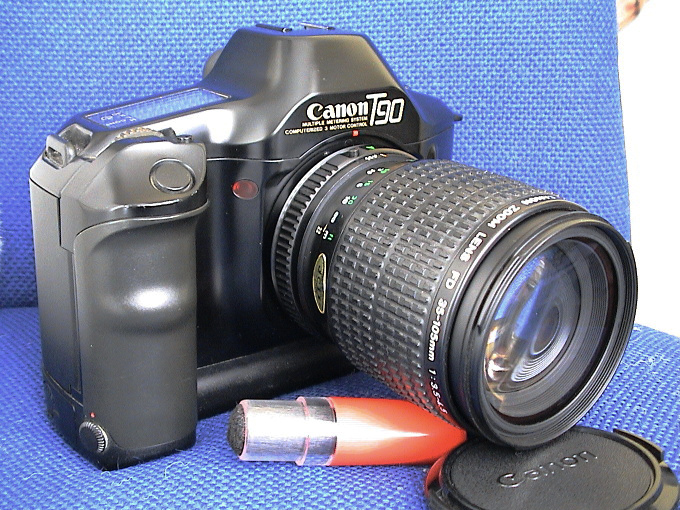
Front view; it is a large camera. The battery tray forms a modest portrait grip.

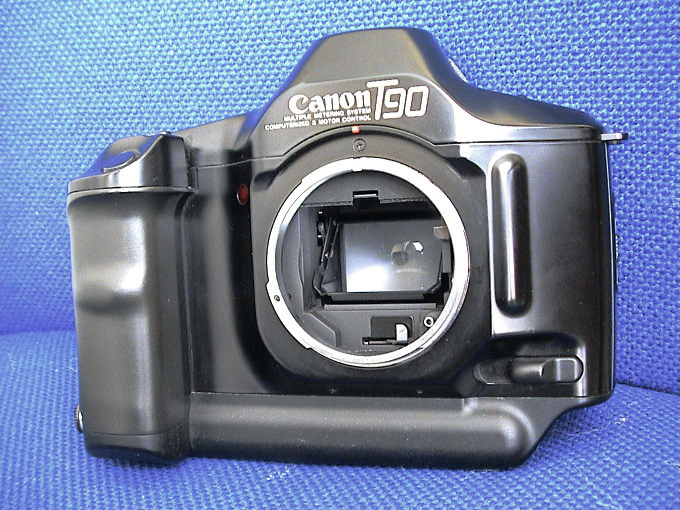
Lens removed, showing mount, reflex mirror

The Canon T90, introduced in 1986, was the top of the line in Canon's T series of 35 mm Single-lens reflex (SLR) cameras. It is the last professional-level manual-focus camera from Canon, and the last professional camera to use the Canon FD lens mount. Although it was overtaken by the autofocus revolution and Canon's new, incompatible EOS (Electro-Optical System) after only a year in production, the T90 pioneered many concepts seen in high-end Canon cameras up to the present day, particularly the user interface, industrial design, and the high level of automation.

Due to its ruggedness, the T90 was nicknamed "the tank" by Japanese photojournalists. Many have still rated it highly even 30+ years after its introduction.

== Design ==
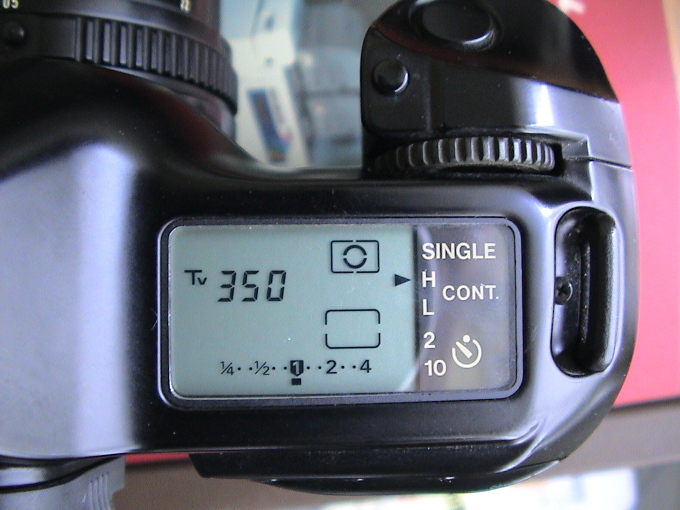
The T-90's LCD screen and control wheel

Previous Canon cameras had been wholly in-house design projects. For the T90, Canon brought in German industrial designer Luigi Colani in a collaboration with Canon's own designers. The final design was composed of Colani's ideas by Kunihisa Ito of ODS Co. Ltd., incorporating Colani's distinctive "bio-form" curvaceous shapes. Canon considered Colani's contribution important enough to present him with the first production T90 body, engraved with his name. Computer-aided design techniques were introduced to Canon for the T90, as well as the use of computer controlled (CNC) milling machines to make the molding dies for the shell.

Much work went into human factors engineering to create an ergonomic user interface for the camera. The form of previous cameras was largely dictated by the required locations of mechanical controls on the body, such as the film advance lever, rewind crank, shutter speed dial, shutter release, etc. On the T90, the film transport control is no longer required, while the others are no longer mechanically linked. This gave the designers more freedom to shape the camera to make it easier to control and hold, and to place controls in a way that suited the user rather than a mechanical design.

The T90 introduced features still used on SLR cameras today. While the use of a LCD screen on the top of the camera's right hand side was not new for the T90 – it was introduced on the T70 – the T90 refined it to show even more camera information. A control wheel is located behind the shutter release and convenient for the right index finger is used to adjust most camera settings in conjunction with other buttons located for the right thumb and on the left-hand side of the camera; again, this design is still used in Canon's digital SLRs in current production.

== Power features ==
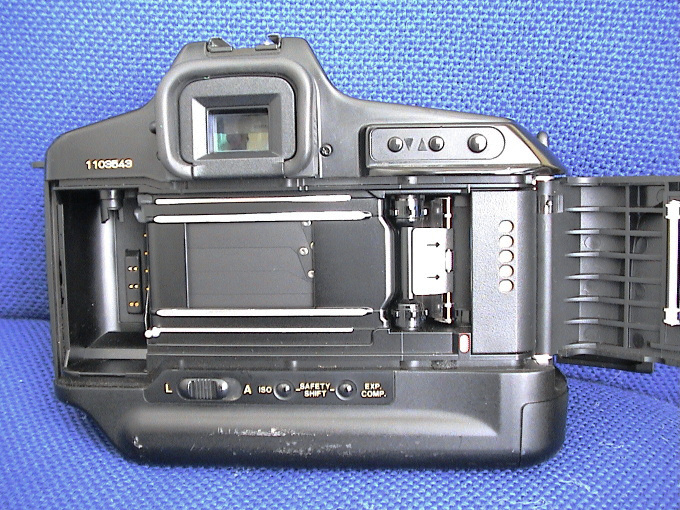
Rear, showing film path, shutter

The T90 includes an integral motor driven film advance, focal plane shutter, mirror and aperture cocking and rewind functions. Canon broke new ground with the powered features of the camera. Previously, cameras used one powerful electric motor geared to all functions. Instead, the T90 has three coreless micromotors within the body, close to the functions they drive, for maximum mechanical advantage. One is used to wind the film, achieving a rate of 4.5 frames per second. A second prepares the shutter, mirror etc. for the next shot. A third motor powers the rewind function. All of this is driven by four AA batteries in the base of the camera.

To control the camera's systems, the T90 uses a dual CPU architecture. The main, low-power CPU runs at 32 kHz while the sub-CPU runs at 1 MHz, and is powered down when not needed. The main CPU handles the LCD and overall state, while the sub-CPU handles exposure calculations, viewfinder display, and control of the camera's motors. This architecture provides for lower power usage. Both CPUs, plus other integrated circuits and components, are mounted on several flexible circuit boards that fit around the camera's structure.

A coin-type lithium battery on the main circuit board retains camera settings when the AA batteries are removed. This is not a user-serviceable part, and when it fails the camera has to be brought to a service center where the battery can be replaced by a Canon technician. Expected battery life is on the order of five years, although this depends on a variety of factors including the duration of periods without main battery (4xAA) power.

== Metering ==
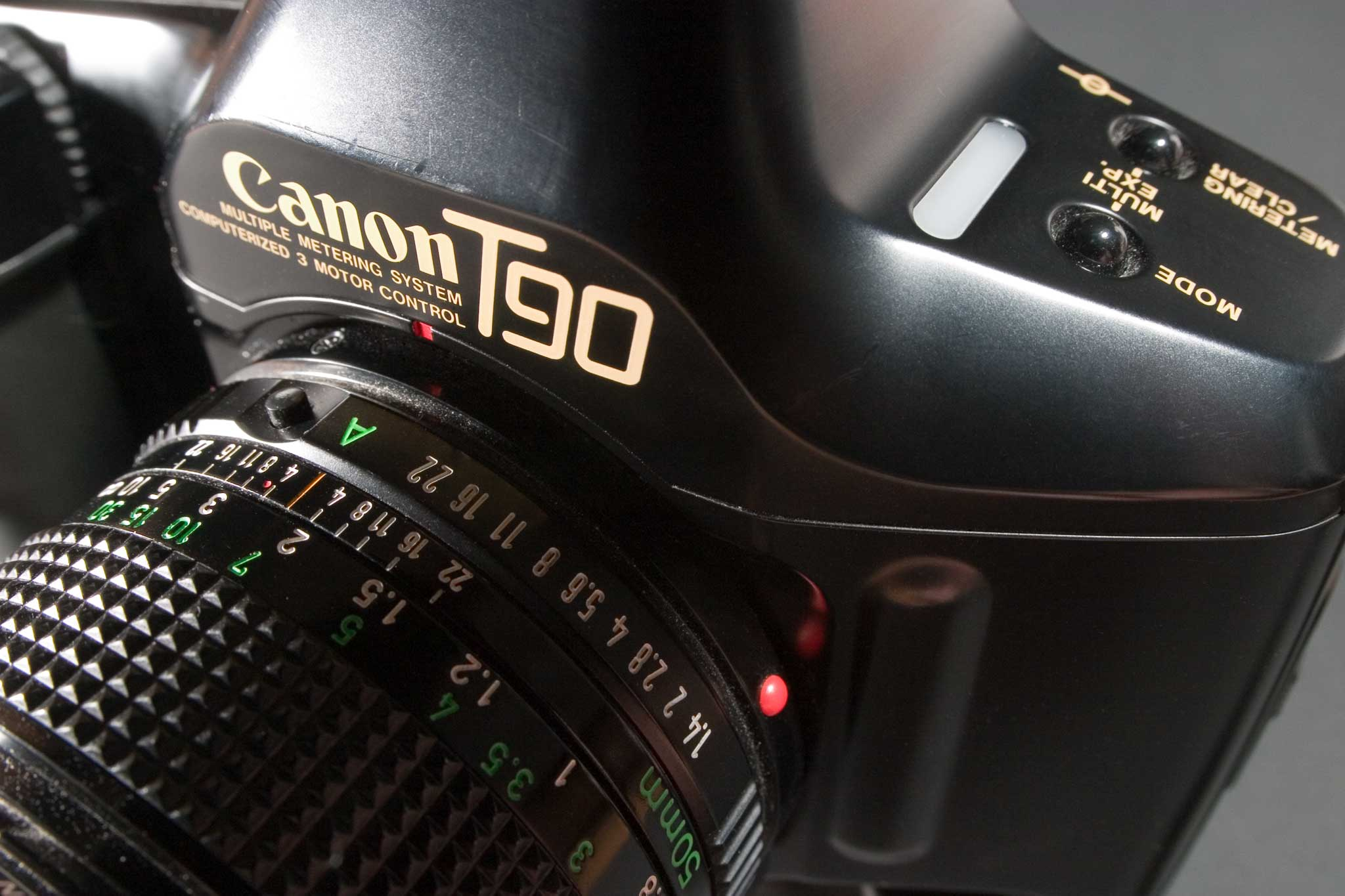
Metering mode is set by button and command wheel

For the T90, Canon developed their most sophisticated light-metering system yet. Although it introduced no novel metering techniques, it assembled the majority of the metering techniques then developed into one easy-to-use system. First, it took the metering options from the New F-1—center-weighted average metering, partial area metering, and spot metering—and makes them available with a press of a button and a turn of the command dial. The New F-1 requires a focusing screen change to switch metering patterns. On the T90, partial area metering uses the center 13% of the picture area, while spot metering uses the center 2.7%.

To these, Canon copied the metering options found on Olympus' OM-4. Multi-spot metering allows the photographer to average up to eight spot meter readings from different parts of the scene. In another feature borrowed from Olympus, separate Highlight and Shadow spot readings could be taken. These adjust the camera's metering decisions to ensure extremes of tonal range are not muted and grey in the final exposure.

Two built-in sensors are used to implement all these metering options. Center-weighted and partial area metering are performed by a double-area silicon photocell (SPC) in Canon's standard location above the eyepiece, while spot metering is performed by another SPC located at the bottom of the mirror box. Light reaches that sensor via a half-silvered area of the main mirror and a secondary mirror located beneath it. The spot metering cell also allows for automatic TTL "off-the-film" flash metering, again borrowed from Olympus.

Notably lacking is what is now the most common metering mode on SLR cameras, matrix metering. Nikon had introduced this in the FA in 1983, but Canon did not follow suit until 1987's EOS 650.

== Exposure ==
Eight exposure modes are available. Program AE (Auto-Exposure) mode puts exposure control completely in the hands of the camera. Variable Shift Program AE allows the photographer to bias the camera towards narrow aperture with three Wide Angle settings, or fast shutter speed with three Telephoto settings as well as the standard mode. For more manual control, Aperture Priority AE and Shutter-Speed Priority AE allow the photographer to set one exposure variable manually while the camera chooses the other.

In either of the latter two modes, a Safety Shift feature allows the camera to adjust the "fixed" parameter if it can not obtain a correct exposure otherwise. For example, in Aperture Priority mode, if the photographer has the aperture fixed wide open to photograph a very bright scene, the correct shutter speed to expose correctly at that aperture might be faster than the camera is capable of. Safety Shift lets the camera reduce the aperture until it can achieve a correct exposure at maximum shutter speed. The Safety Shift feature can be turned on and off by pressing two buttons on the back of the camera near the base.

If no automation of exposure is desired, a Manual mode is available. In this, the camera's metering acts as a sophisticated light-meter, but all decisions are made by the photographer. For use with older lenses that do not have an automated aperture diaphragm, Stopped-down Aperture Priority AE or Stopped-down Manual can be used; these instruct the camera that the currently set aperture will be the taking aperture, and to therefore adjust the metering calculations accordingly. Finally, a Flash AE mode is available for flash photography.

== Flash ==
The T90 was the first Canon camera to support through-the-lens (TTL) flash metering. This measures the actual light levels reaching the film by measuring reflected light off the film (OTF), shutting down the flash unit once the film is sufficiently exposed. The measurement is calculated using the average reflectivity of color negative film. This system is also used on Canon's new EOS system, making the T90 the only non-EOS Canon body compatible with TTL Canon flashes. The T90's X-sync speed of 1/250 second was the fastest Canon had achieved and is better than most other cameras available at the time it was in production.

A new, dedicated flash unit, the Speedlite 300TL, was launched alongside the T90 to support its new flash modes. It has a zoomable head, capable of adjustment (by moving the head in and out) to cover the fields of view of 24, 35, 50 and 85 mm lenses. For bounce flash, the head can be rotated up to 90° vertically, 180° to the left, and 90° to the right. As well as the plain TTL mode, the 300TL supports A-TTL (Advanced TTL); here, the flash-to-subject distance is calculated using an infrared pulse with a detector mounted on the flash body. In bounce mode, however, it uses a 1/20th power pre-flash instead.

A pre-flash is also used in FE Lock mode (flash exposure lock). In this mode, the pre-flash is used in conjunction with spot metering to determine the correct exposure in advance of taking the picture. Thus, the camera can be moved to reframe the main subject off-center and still expose correctly.

For exposures slower than the X-sync speed, previous SLR flash systems triggered the flash at the start of the exposure, as soon as the first shutter curtain had finished its travel. However, for motion blurs and light trails in a longer exposure, this method gives the impression of backwards movement, since the motion trails out in front of the moving object after the flash. The T90, became the first mass-market camera to support second-curtain flash, where the flash fires at the end of the exposure, just before the second shutter curtain starts to close.

Although not identical, the current (2009) Canon Speedlite 580 EX II supports the T90 as well.

Canon also produced a dedicated macro ring flash for the camera, the ML-2. This supports TTL and manual models only, and contains two flash tubes, one on either side, which can be fired separately or together. The system consists of the flash ring itself, which fits onto the end of the lens, and a control unit that screws into the hot shoe atop the camera. The later ML-3 ring flash, introduced for the EOS system cameras, also supports the T90.

== Accessories ==
While the T90 does not support the vast range of accessories available for Canon's F-1, F-1n or New F-1, a number of significant accessories are available. The pentaprism is not interchangeable, but the focusing screen is; eight different screens are available for different applications. Standard is the New Split/Microprism screen, which offers three of the most common focusing aids simultaneously; the central circle is a split image prism, surrounded by a microprism ring; the rest of the screen is a laser matte.

Two optional data backs are available for the T90. The first, the Command Back 90, both allows date and data imprinting on the photographs and also allowed various forms of time-lapse photography. The second, sold by Canon only in certain markets, is the Data Memory Back 90, which stores 16 shot variables for up to 156 exposures, or six variables for up to 338 exposures. The computer interface to the Data Memory Back 90 supports only the MSX home computer standard. Third parties have adapted connectors to other computer systems.

A wired 60T3 remote control unit plugs into a socket fitted beneath the right handgrip, while an infrared remote control kit is also available as the LC-2. This unit also supports an Auto Sensing mode for completely unmanned photography. This trips the shutter whenever something blocked the path between transmitter and receiver—useful in wildlife photography, for example.

== Modifications ==
A number of modifications to the T90 have been performed over the years, by Canon or third parties, in order to add features missing from the camera as-built:

- PC flash sync socket: As built, the T90 lacks a separate flash sync socket. The addition of one could be performed by request by Canon support centers. If so modified, it is fitted on the left-hand side of the prism housing, as seen by the user.
- Vertical shutter release: actually an accessory, since it requires no camera modification. A vertical shutter release, convenient to the right index finger when holding the camera vertically, was available from Canon Professional. It fits into the remote control socket on the camera at that location.
- Mirror lock-up: Canon considered the mirror in the T90 sufficiently damped as to need no mirror lock-up feature. Many users disagree, and instructions on how to modify the camera to add this feature are available.
- Leader-out film rewind: Photographers who like to change film mid-roll prefer the film leader to be left out when the film is rewound, so they do not have to fish for it with a leader retrieval tool. Instructions on how to perform a modification to enable this are detailed online. Since the modification consists only of connecting two solder pads on a circuit board with a wire, clearly the capability was built into the camera's electronics but not enabled.

== Use today ==
Canon stopped supporting the camera in 1998 and spare parts are no longer available from them.

One issue is with LCD (liquid crystal display) life, a problem not unique to the T90. LCDs age and wear out at a varying rate dependent on environmental conditions, use and other factors. Commonly quoted lifespans are about five to ten years; thus, many T90s will have displays nearing the end of their lives, even if they have been replaced. The spare part is no longer available and no third-party replacement has emerged.

The plastic battery holder on the T90 is somewhat susceptible to breakage, and can cause the camera to become inoperative. Used cameras should be carefully checked for broken/repaired battery holder compartments. Another common problem is failure of the second internal battery that retains frame number/ISO settings, replacement of which requires service by a person skilled in soldering techniques and camera disassembly.

Another, more serious, problem concerns the shutter. The T90's shutter appears to become "sticky" as the camera ages. It is prone to locking up, in which case the camera's LCDs "EEE" and the message "HELP" appears in the viewfinder display. This is commonly called the "EEE syndrome" among users. The problem is most likely to crop up after the camera has been left unused for some time; thus, the best way to prevent it is regular use of the camera. It does not seem to cause inaccurate shutter speeds before failure. The problem can be corrected by a knowledgeable technician without replacing the shutter mechanism. It is reportedly caused by dirt on the shutter's magnets affecting their performance. But if left unused for an extended period of time the circuit will need to be replaced, an expensive and time-consuming proposition.

The sticky shutter problem relates to a rubber washer that is involved in the operation of the shutter. With age and atmospheric conditions, it tends to deteriorate and become sticky, so that it impedes the operation of the shutter. Frequent use can delay the stickiness from 'glueing up' the shutter, but once started, the only long-term remedy is to have the shutter repaired.

== Notes ==
	1971	1972	1973	1974	1975	1976	1977	1978	1979	1980	1981	1982	1983	1984	1985	1986	1987	1988	1989	1990	1991	1992	1993
Professional																T90							
Professional		F-1 High Speed Motor Drive Camera												New F-1 High Speed Motor Drive Camera									
Professional	F-1						F-1N / F-1 (Later Model)					New F-1											
Amateur				EF					A-1														
Amateur															T70								
Amateur	FTb			FTb-N			AE-1					AE-1 Program											
Amateur					TLb					AV-1			AL-1			T80							
Amateur					TX		AT-1							T50							T60		
