= Canon T70 =

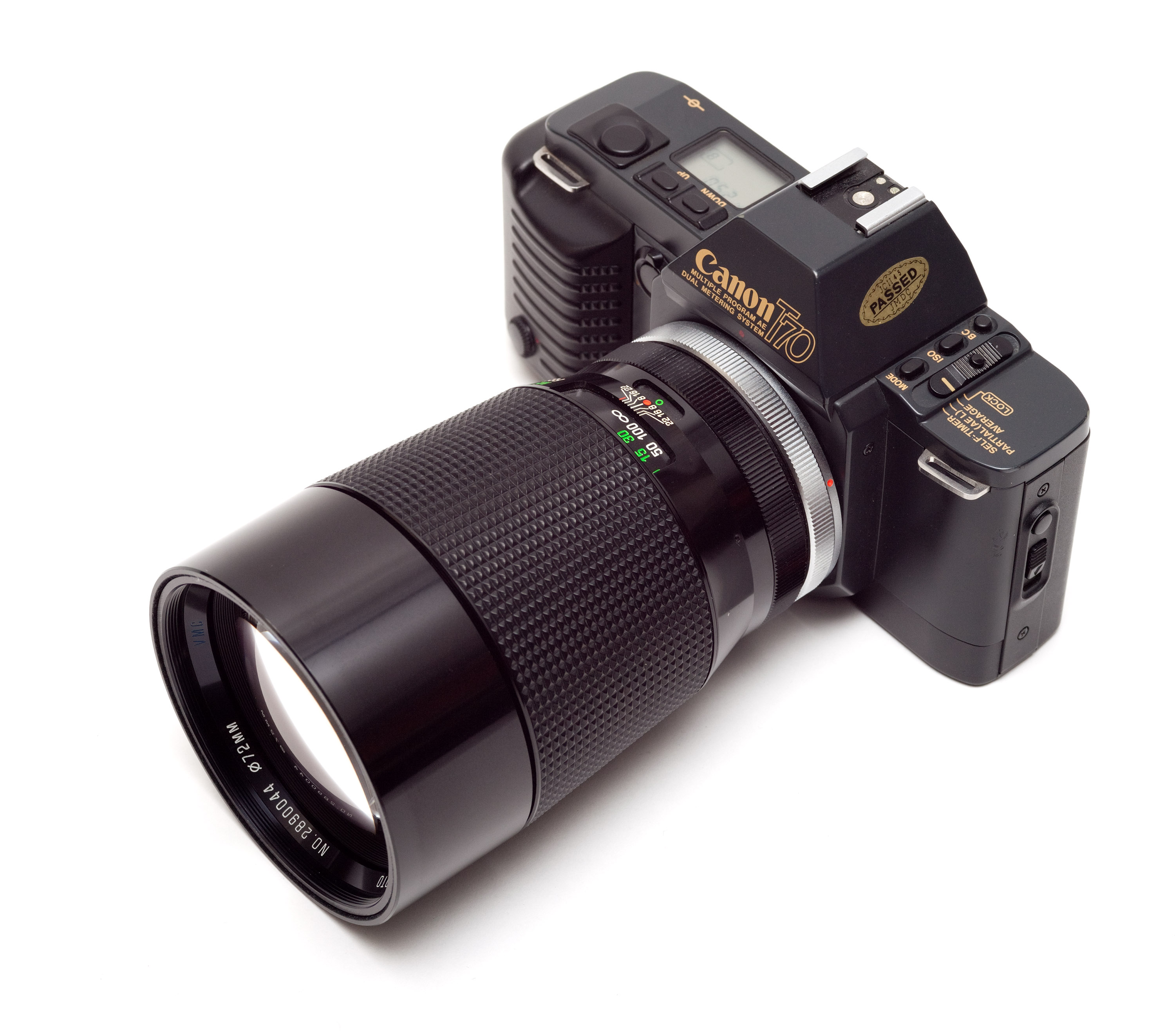
- The Canon T70

Overview
- Maker: Canon
- Type: 35 mm SLR
- Intro price: ¥69,000 (equivalent to ¥83,644 in 2019), body only

Focusing
- Focus: Manual

Exposure/metering
- Exposure: Manual, Shutter Priority and Program autoexposure

Flash
- Flash: Hot shoe

General
- Dimensions: 89×151×48 mm (3.5×5.9×1.9 in)
- Weight: 580 g (20 oz) (1.28 lb)
- Made in: Japan

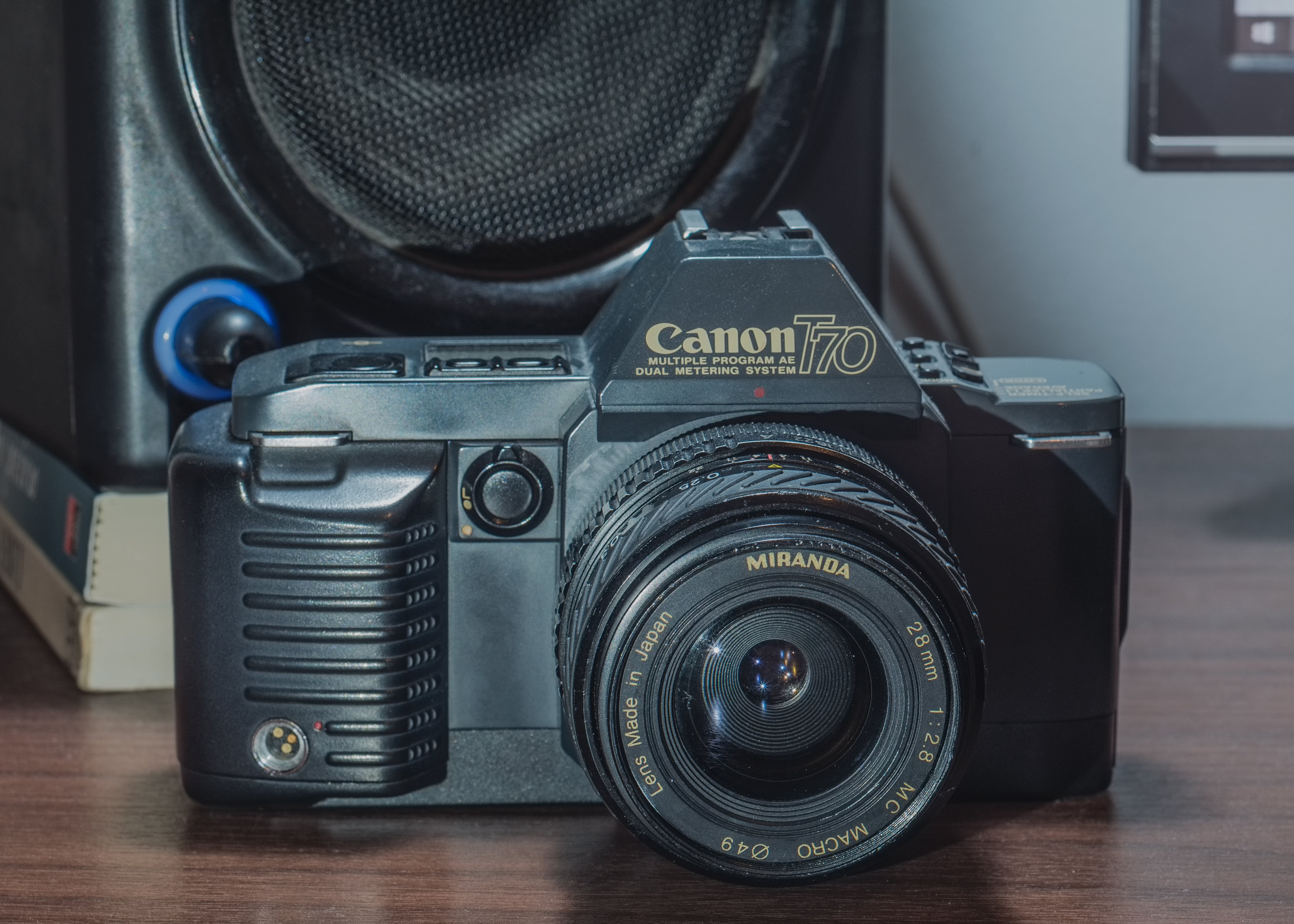
The front of the camera.

The Canon T70 was a 35mm FD-mount single-lens reflex camera introduced in April 1984 as the second in Canon's T series. The T70 started with the concepts explored in 1983's T50, took them further, and applied them to a more sophisticated camera. While the Program AE-only T50 was intended as a beginner's camera, the T70 gave the photographer a lot more control over the camera's operation while keeping the T-series philosophy of simplicity in control and operation intact.

== Camera features ==
=== Power ===
All film transport on the T70 was powered—loading, advance and rewind. The continuous shooting rate, at 0.7 frames per second, was slower than rival motor drives, but the drive was nonetheless faster than most people could manually wind. To load the camera, the photographer simply had to pull the film leader out to an orange mark and close the back—the camera did the rest, loading the leader onto the spool, and advancing to the first frame automatically. All powered camera functions drew on two AA batteries in the grip. A built-in lithium battery (BR-1225 or CR-1220) was used to store user settings such as current exposure count and ISO setting; the batteries lasted for about five years, and had to be replaced by a technician, since replacing them required partial dismantling of the camera body and desoldering the battery from a flexible circuit board. The camera will still operate without issue if the battery has failed.

=== Controls ===
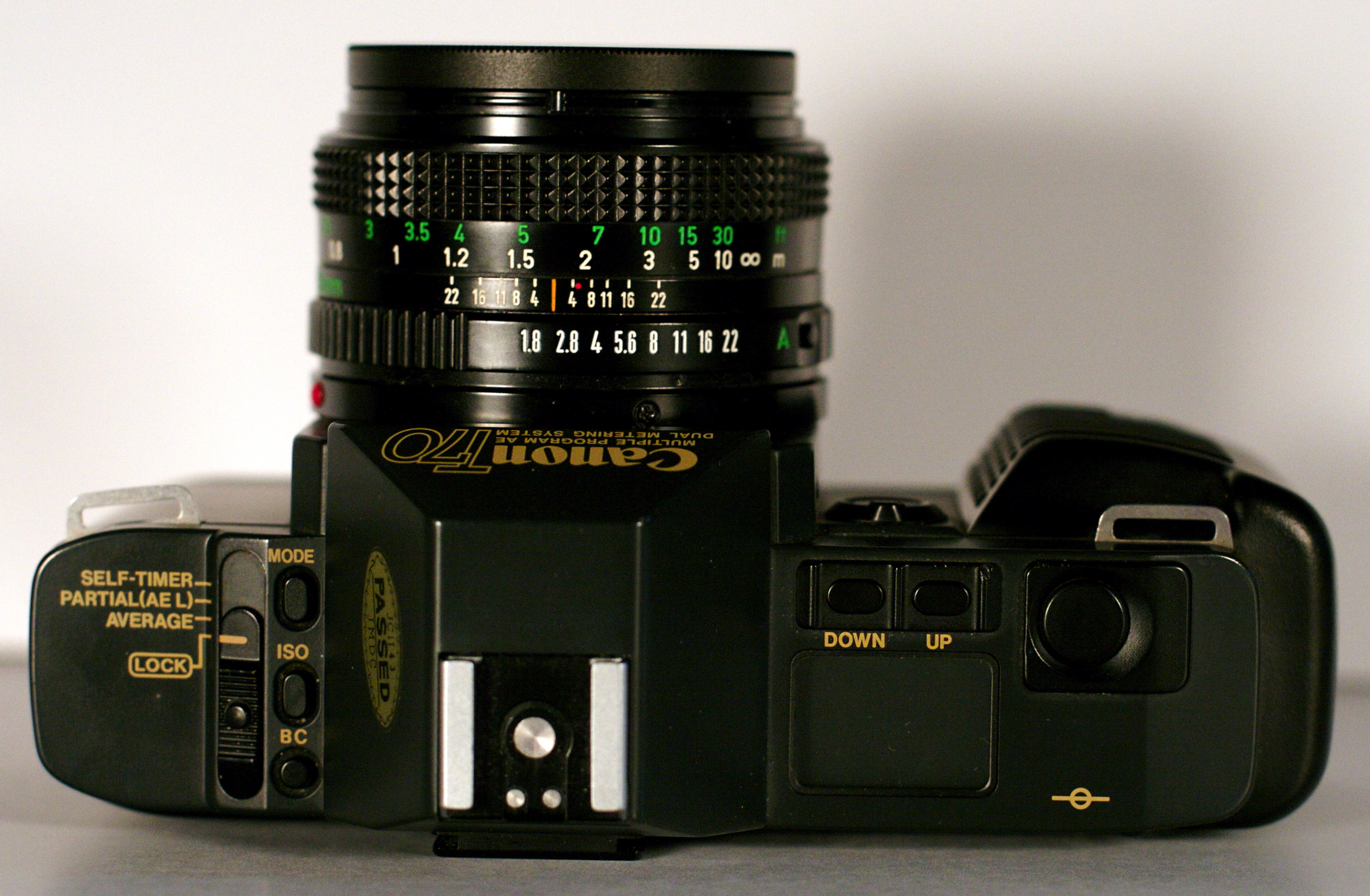
Top, showing controls.

The T70 used an LCD mounted on the top of the right-hand side of the camera as a major component of its user interface. Two buttons above the display labeled 'UP' and 'DOWN' adjusted the selected parameter and the results were shown on the LCD. Buttons on the left-hand top of the camera selected the parameter to be modified.

=== Metering ===
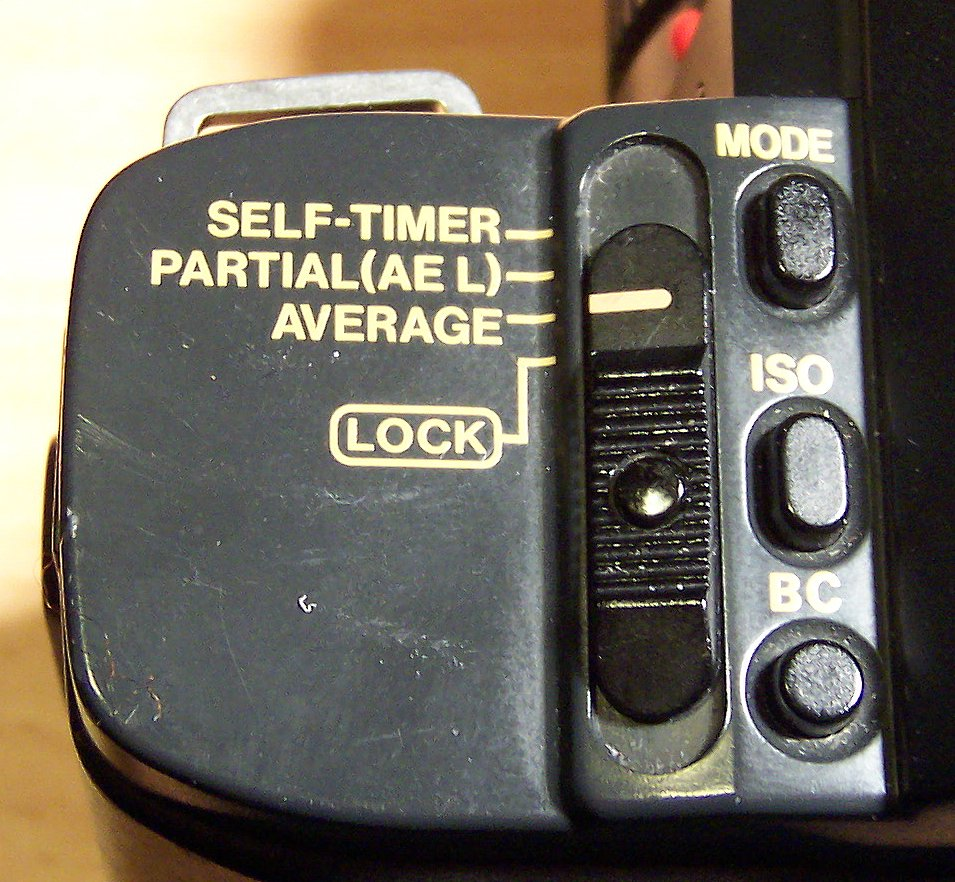
Switch to select metering mode.

The T70 included two different through-the-lens metering methods; both used a silicon photocell housed above the viewfinder eyepiece. Center-weighted average metering was the standard metering method, averaging over the whole frame with a slight preference towards the center of the frame, where the main subject is most likely to be. With strongly backlit scenes, or ones where the subject is spotlit against a dark background, center-weighted averaging produces underexposure or overexposure, respectively. For such situations, the T70 also supported selective area metering, which metered only the center 11% of the frame. The metering mode was selected by a sliding switch on the top left-hand side of the camera (from the photographer's perspective). This switch also selected self-timer mode and had a Lock position.

=== Exposure modes ===
The T70 supported eight different exposure modes. These were:

- Program AE (autoexposure). In this standard mode, the camera judges the shutter speed and aperture for average photographic scenes.
- Wide Program AE. Here, the camera is biased towards choosing narrow apertures for greater depth of field, most often useful with wide-angle lenses.
- Tele Program AE. Here, the camera is biased towards choosing wider apertures for narrow depth of field and fast shutter speeds, most useful with telephoto lenses.
- Shutter-priority AE. Here, the user selects the shutter speed and the camera chooses the correct aperture.
- Programmed flash AE. This is designed to work with the Speedlite 277T dedicated flash unit.
- Electronic flash AE. For flash exposures with non-dedicated flash units.
- Manual. Here, the photographer chooses both aperture and shutter speed.
- Stopped-down AE. For use with older FL-mount lenses that do not support open-aperture metering. Also for use with macro photography attachments such as extension tubes and bellows, and for using non-Canon lenses with an adaptor. Cannot be selected with an FD lens attached.

=== Data back ===
A dedicated Command Back 70 supported date and data imprinting as well as time exposures, to take a photograph at a programmed time, and to take time-lapse photos at programmed intervals. The shutter of the T70 was not battery dependent during bulb exposures, and was one reason why the command back could support timed exposures of several hours duration.

== Marketing ==
In Japan, Canon released promotional materials for the T70 featuring artwork by Akira creator Katsuhiro Otomo, who also directed two commercials for the camera.

In the U.S., the T70 was endorsed by sports personalities such as Larry Bird, Wayne Gretzky, and John Madden.

== Reception ==
When it was introduced, the Canon T70 was considered technologically advanced compared to other SLR cameras. Reviewing the camera in Popular Science, Everett Ortner said that the T70 "could be...too good for amateurs. It is certainly far removed from those other technological wonders designed for amateurs". He praised the high degree of control, coupled with automation, that the T70 allows photographers to use, reducing "the role of the camera from that of master to servant."

== Gallery ==
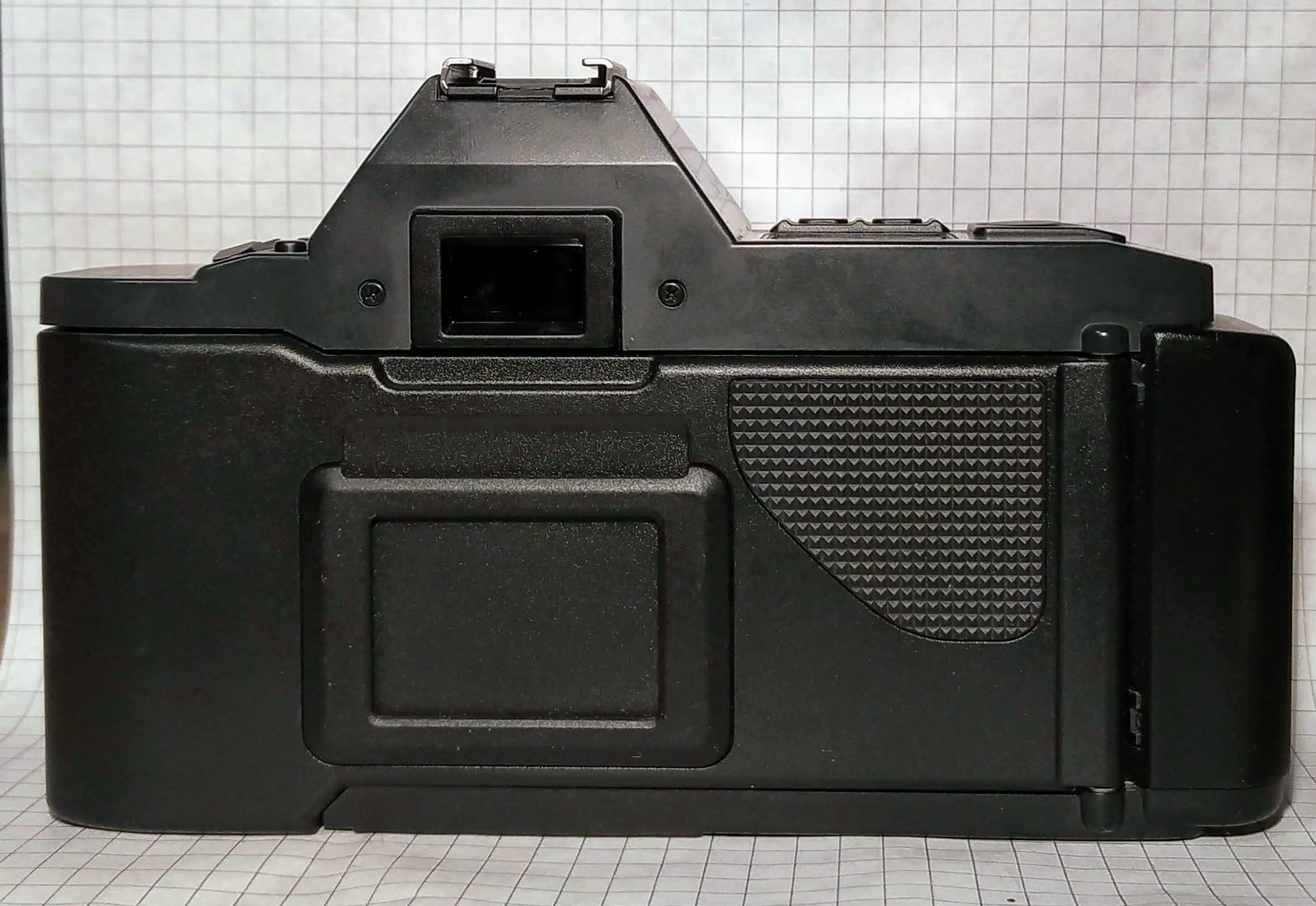
Back of the T70

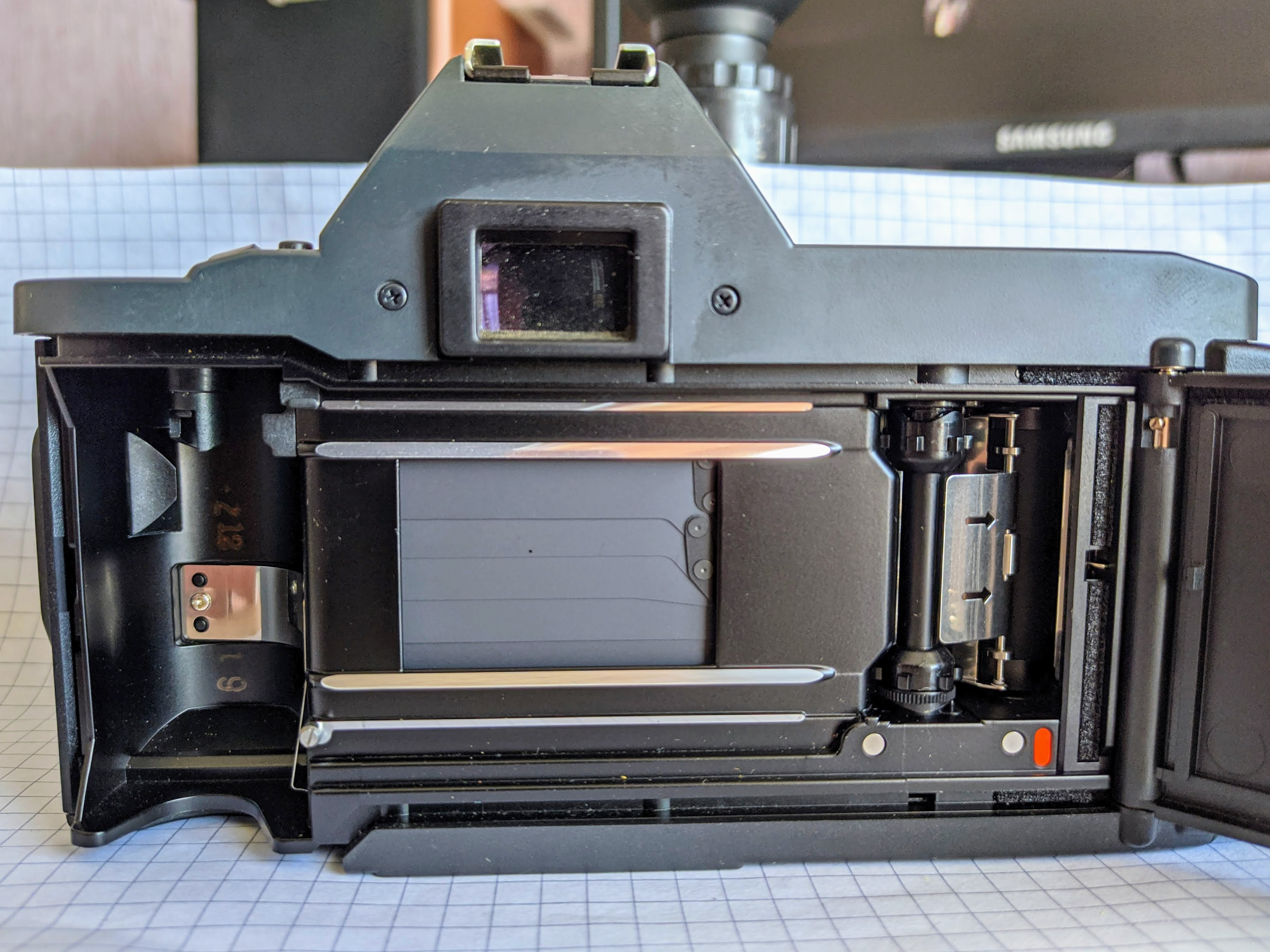
Shutter curtains

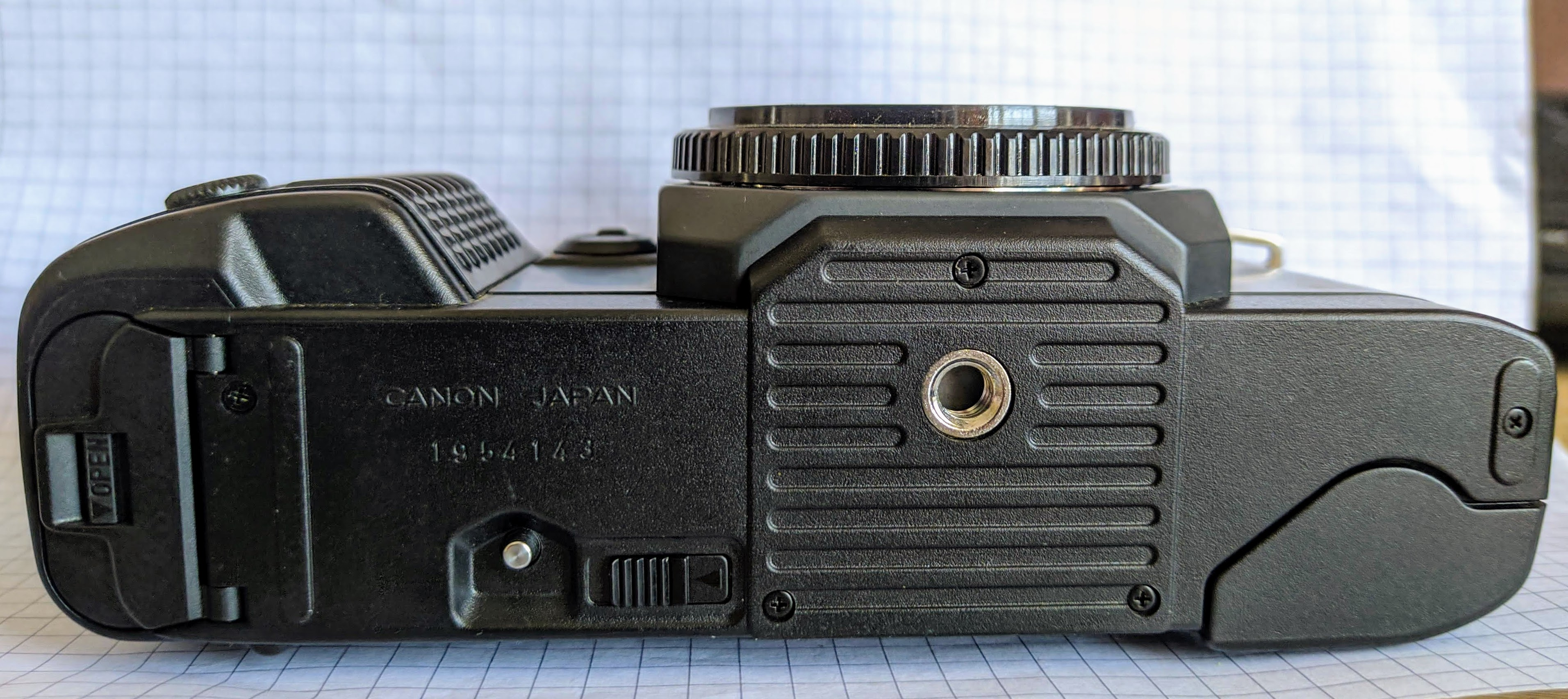
Bottom of the T70, with battery compartment and tripod socket

	1971	1972	1973	1974	1975	1976	1977	1978	1979	1980	1981	1982	1983	1984	1985	1986	1987	1988	1989	1990	1991	1992	1993
Professional																T90							
Professional		F-1 High Speed Motor Drive Camera												New F-1 High Speed Motor Drive Camera									
Professional	F-1						F-1N / F-1 (Later Model)					New F-1											
Amateur				EF					A-1														
Amateur															T70								
Amateur	FTb			FTb-N			AE-1					AE-1 Program											
Amateur					TLb					AV-1			AL-1			T80							
Amateur					TX		AT-1							T50							T60		
