= Nikon FM10 =

1995 35mm single-lens reflex camera

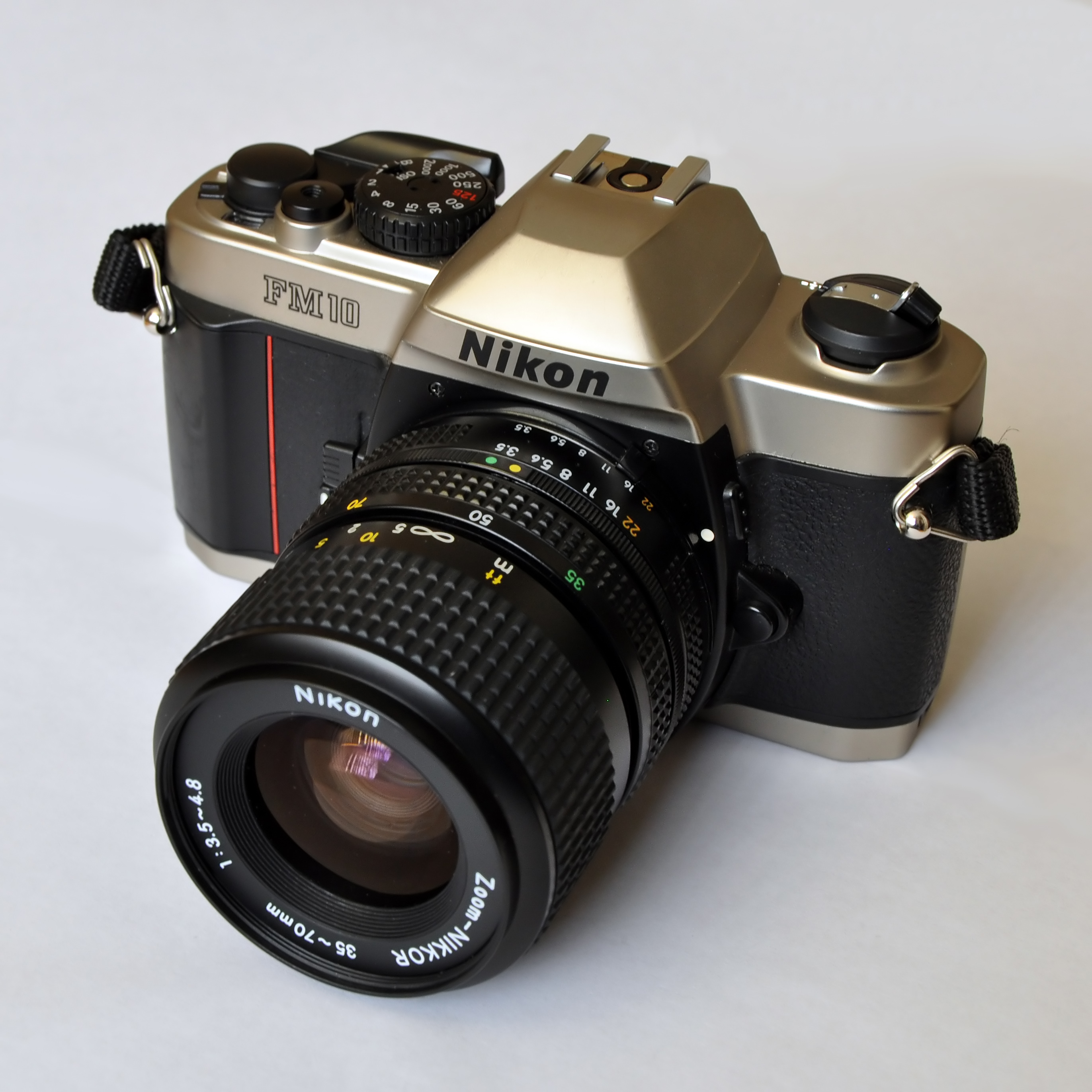
- Nikon FM10 with a Zoom Nikkor 35-70 mm f/3.5-4.8 zoom lens.

Overview
- Maker: Nikon
- Type: Single lens reflex
- Production: 1995 - circa 2022; 28 years

Lens
- Lens: interchangeable lens, Nikon F-mount
- Compatible lenses: Nikon F-mount lenses supporting automatic indexing (AI) with exceptions

Sensor/medium
- Film format: 35mm (135)
- Film size: 36mm x 24mm
- Film advance: manual
- Film rewind: manual

Focusing
- Focus modes: manual

Exposure/metering
- Exposure metering: silicon photodiode light meter, TTL metering
- Metering modes: 60/40 percent centerweighted

Flash
- Flash: hot shoe only
- Flash synchronization: 1/125s; normal sync. only
- Compatible flashes: Nikon SB-M; other non-dedicated hot shoe flashes

Shutter
- Shutter: mechanically controlled
- Shutter speed range: 1s to 1/2000s and bulb

Viewfinder
- Viewfinder: fixed eye-level pentaprism

General
- Battery: two S76 or A76, or one 1/3N
- Dimensions: 139×86×53 mm (5.5×3.4×2.1 in)
- Weight: 420 g (15 oz)

The Nikon FM10 is a manual focus 35 mm film camera formerly sold by Nikon Corporation. It is of SLR design and was first available in 1995. It is normally sold in a kit that includes a Zoom Nikkor 35–70 mm f/3.5-4.8 zoom lens, although a Zoom Nikkor 70–210 mm f/4.5-5.6 zoom lens is also available. An electronic companion model known as the FE10 was released in 1997.

The FM10 is not manufactured by Nikon, and is not a true member of the Nikon compact F-series SLRs, as the name implies. It is manufactured by Cosina in Japan (as are both the lenses), and is derived from the Cosina CT-1 chassis.

Following Nikon's decision in January 2006 to concentrate on digital cameras, the FM10 and the high-end F6 became the sole remaining film SLRs to carry the Nikon name. However, by mid-2022 the FM10 had been marked as "discontinued" across multiple Nikon sites.

The FM10 has a shutter speed range of 1 to 1/2000th second plus bulb and flash X-sync of 1/125th second. Its dimensions are 139 x 86 x 53 mm, and it weighs 420g. The camera is finished in black with champagne chrome trim.

The FM10 was originally intended for sale in developing Asian markets, but was later sold in Western countries too.

== Features ==
=== Operation ===
The FM10 is a mechanically (springs, gears, levers) controlled manual focus SLR with manual exposure control. It is operable without batteries, which are only required (two S76 or A76, or one 1/3N) for the light metering information system. This consists of an internal 60/40 percent centerweighted, silicon photodiode light meter linked to a center-the-LED exposure control system using vertically arranged +/•/– light emitting diodes (LEDs) on the left side of the viewfinder to indicate the readings of the meter versus the actual camera settings. The focusing screen also has 3 mm split image rangefinder and 1 mm microprism collar focusing aids. Overall, the FM10 has the features of a typical late 1970s SLR.

=== Lens compatibility ===
The FM10 accepts any lens with the Nikon F bayonet mount supporting the Aperture Indexing (AI) feature (introduced in 1977), and thus the majority of Nikon lenses manufactured in recent decades. The modern Nikon-made AI lenses are the AF-S Nikkor, AF-I Nikkor, AF Nikkor D and Nikkor AI-S types. The discontinued Nikkor AI and Nikon Series E lenses are also AI types. Many third-party Nikon-mount lenses will also mount and function correctly on the FM10.

Many of the newest Nikon and third-party F-mount lenses, and some older designs, will mount on the FM10, but will not function properly. Nikon’s most recent 35 mm film/full-frame FX digital SLR lenses, the AF Nikkor G type (introduced in 2000) lack an aperture control ring, without which there is no way to set aperture using the FM10. AF Nikkor DX type (2003) lack an aperture ring as well, and have a smaller image circles sized for the smaller sensors on Nikon's DX digital SLRs, thus projecting a black vignette circle onto the FM10 film plane. Nikon's Vibration Reduction (VR) image stabilization system, available on some newer lenses since 2000, does not function on the FM10.

Both IX Nikkor lenses (1996), for Nikon's Advanced Photo System (APS) film SLRs and very old "invasive" Nikkor 35 mm fisheye lenses must not be mounted on the FM10, as their rear elements will intrude far enough into the mirror box to cause damage.

=== Flash ===
The Nikon SB-M dedicated flash is designed specifically for the FM10, but it will also accept any other nondedicated hot shoe mounted flash for guide number manual or flash mounted sensor automatic exposure control – the venerable Vivitar 283 (guide number 120, ASA 100/feet; 37, DIN 21/meters) was still available new a quarter century after its introduction in 1975. The FM10 does not accept a motor drive; film is only advanced manually via a thumb lever.

== Design history ==
=== Chassis ===
The aluminum alloy chassis used in the FM10 can be traced back more than twenty-five years to the Cosina CT-1. Cosina has a long history of producing equipment to specification for other camera companies. Other famous name SLR cameras that were built around Cosina chassis include the Canon T60, Nikon FE10, Olympus OM2000, Ricoh KR-5 Super II, and Yashica FX-3. They differ primarily in their outer cosmetic plastic body panels, lens mounts and nameplates. This chassis is also used, in heavily reworked form, as the basis for the Rollei 35RF, Zeiss Ikon and Cosina's own Voigtländer branded Bessa R series of 35 mm film rangefinder (RF) cameras as well as the unique Epson R-D1 digital rangefinder camera in magnesium alloy.

=== Target markets and criticism ===
The Nikon FM10 fills the very bottom of the Nikon SLR line, and was introduced to meet the needs of the South and East Asian amateur photographic markets. Until then, Nikon cameras were known for high quality and durability, but were also relatively expensive. Despite the emergence of an increasingly prosperous middle-class in these countries, their income had not yet reached Western standards, so even the cheapest Nikons were generally beyond their means. The FM10's limited features and use of relatively dated technology were intended to keep the price as low as possible for these markets.

However, the FM10 has been criticised by some for perceived low quality, attributed to its targeting of the brand-conscious nouveau riche in developing countries. It is claimed that the FM10 was intended for those who desired affordable ownership of a famous brand name, regardless of the actual quality of the camera itself.

When news of the FM10 reached Western photographers, Nikon decided to offer it worldwide. While there have been mixed opinions, with some expressing reservations about its durability, it has been used as an entry level beginner's camera, and for photography students needing or wanting to use film and fully manual, mechanical SLR cameras. The Nikon FM10 sold because of the Nikon brand on its pentaprism, and for its compatibility with a wide range of new and used Nikon and third-party lenses. It is also used as a backup camera by some photographers using other Nikon bodies.

=== Discontinuation ===
In January 2006, Nikon announced that they were discontinuing the majority of their film-based camera bodies. Along with Nikon's flagship model, the F6, the FM10 was one of only two to remain in production.

However, by November 2020, Nikon USA had marked the FM10 as "archived" and by mid-2022 it had been marked "discontinued" across multiple Nikon sites.

== Nikon FE10 ==
The Nikon FE10 was a variant of the FM10 released in 1997. Unlike the mechanical FM10 (which only requires power for optional use of the light meter) the FE10 incorporates more extensive electronic features including an electronically-controlled shutter.

The FE10 also supports aperture priority mode.

Class	1950s			1960s										1970s										1980s										1990s										2000s										2020s			
Class	57	58	59	60	61	62	63	64	65	66	67	68	69	70	71	72	73	74	75	76	77	78	79	80	81	82	83	84	85	86	87	88	89	90	91	92	93	94	95	96	97	98	99	00	01	02	03	04	05	06	07	08	09	...	20	21	22
Profes- sional			F																					F3																																	
Profes- sional															F2												F3AF					F4								F5								F6									
High- end																											FA					F-801 (N8008)/ F-801s (N8008s)				F90 (N90)		F90X (N90s)					F100														
Mid- range																														F-501 (N2020)				F-601 (N6006)				F70 (N70)						F80 (N80)													
Mid- range																EL / EL2 /ELW						FE					FE2							F-601M (N6000)				F70 (N70)						F80 (N80)													
Mid- range									FT		FTn/ FT2/ FT3										FM					FM2/FM2n																			FM3A												
Mid- range									FS												FM					FM2/FM2n																			FM3A												
Entry- level																																																									
Entry- level																																								Pronea 600i/6i																	
Entry- level																																										Pronea S															
Entry- level						Nikkorex F / Nikkor J																	EM			FG			F-301 (N2000)				F-401s (N4004s)					F50 (N50)							F65 (N65 / U)		F75 (N75 / U2)										
Entry- level				35		35 II		Auto 35																				FG-20			F-401 (N4004)				F-401x (N5005)								F60 (N60)			F55 (N55)											
Entry- level							Zoom 35																																FM10 / FE10																		
Class	57	58	59	60	61	62	63	64	65	66	67	68	69	70	71	72	73	74	75	76	77	78	79	80	81	82	83	84	85	86	87	88	89	90	91	92	93	94	95	96	97	98	99	00	01	02	03	04	05	06	07	08	09	...	20	21	22
Class	1950s			1960s										1970s										1980s										1990s										2000s										2020s			
