= Canon New FD 35-70 mm f/4 AF =

The Canon FD 35-70mm f/4 AF lens, released in 1981, was Canon's first attempt at adding autofocus capability to their range of single-lens reflex cameras. Canon took their existing, successful Canon FD 35-70mm f/4 lens and added a box above the lens which housed a self-contained autofocus mechanism, Canon's SST (Solid State Triangulation) system, as used in the AF35ML compact camera earlier that year.

This lens provided autofocus capability when fitted to any Canon FD-mount camera—it did not require any capabilities in the camera body. The photographer simply pushed a button on the lens for it to focus automatically.

Canon used a similar autofocus system for the FD mount Canon T80 of 1985, which had a range of three lenses with integral autofocus electronics and motors. However, the T80's lenses could only autofocus when mounted on the T80. Canon abandoned further development of autofocus for the FD mount in favour of the totally new and incompatible Canon EOS system in 1987.
