= Cosina CT-1 =

35mm film SLR camera

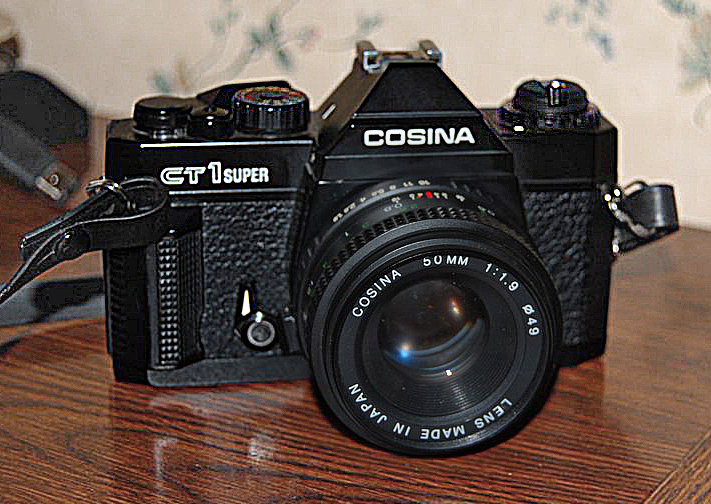
Cosina CT1 Super

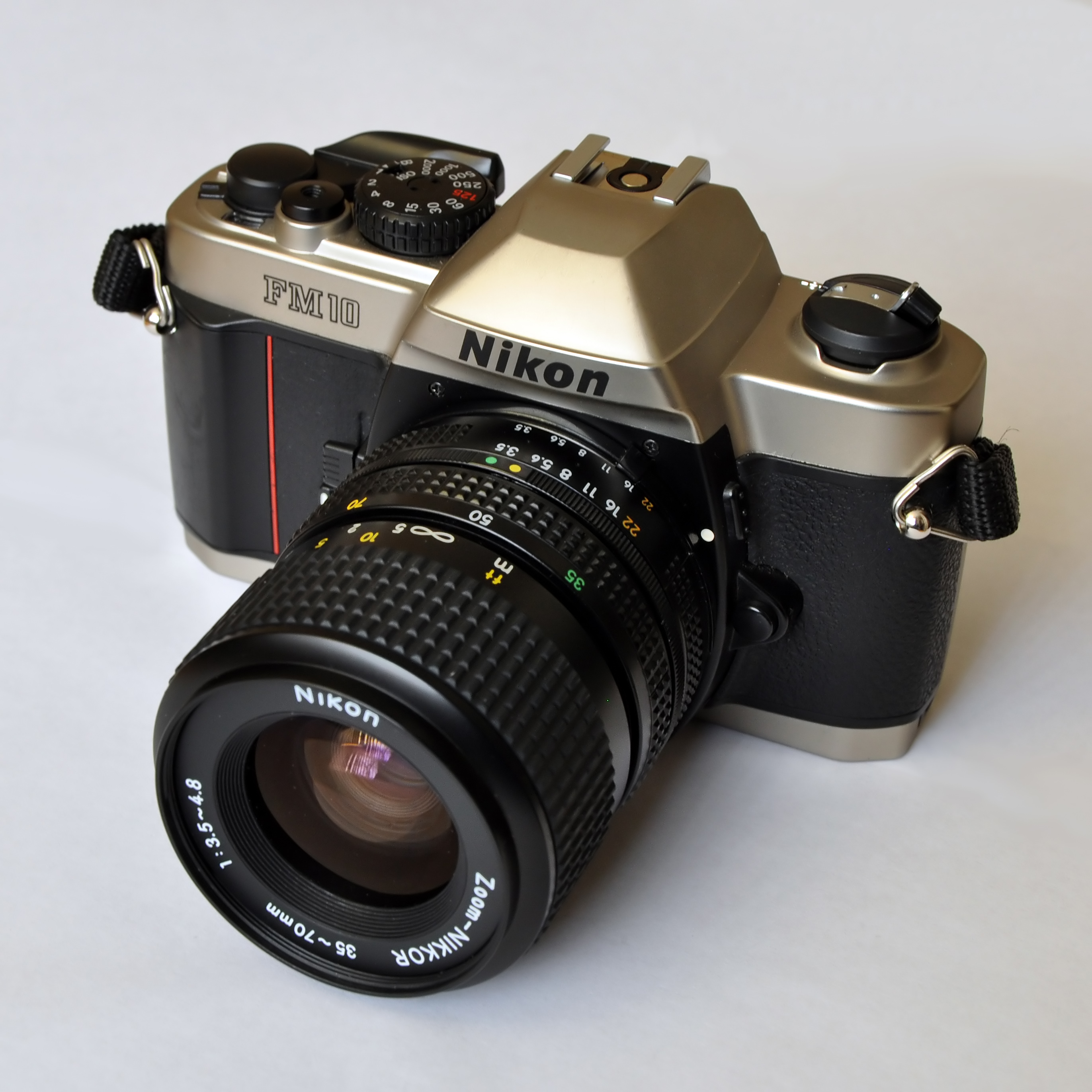
The Nikon FM10 is based on the CT1 chassis

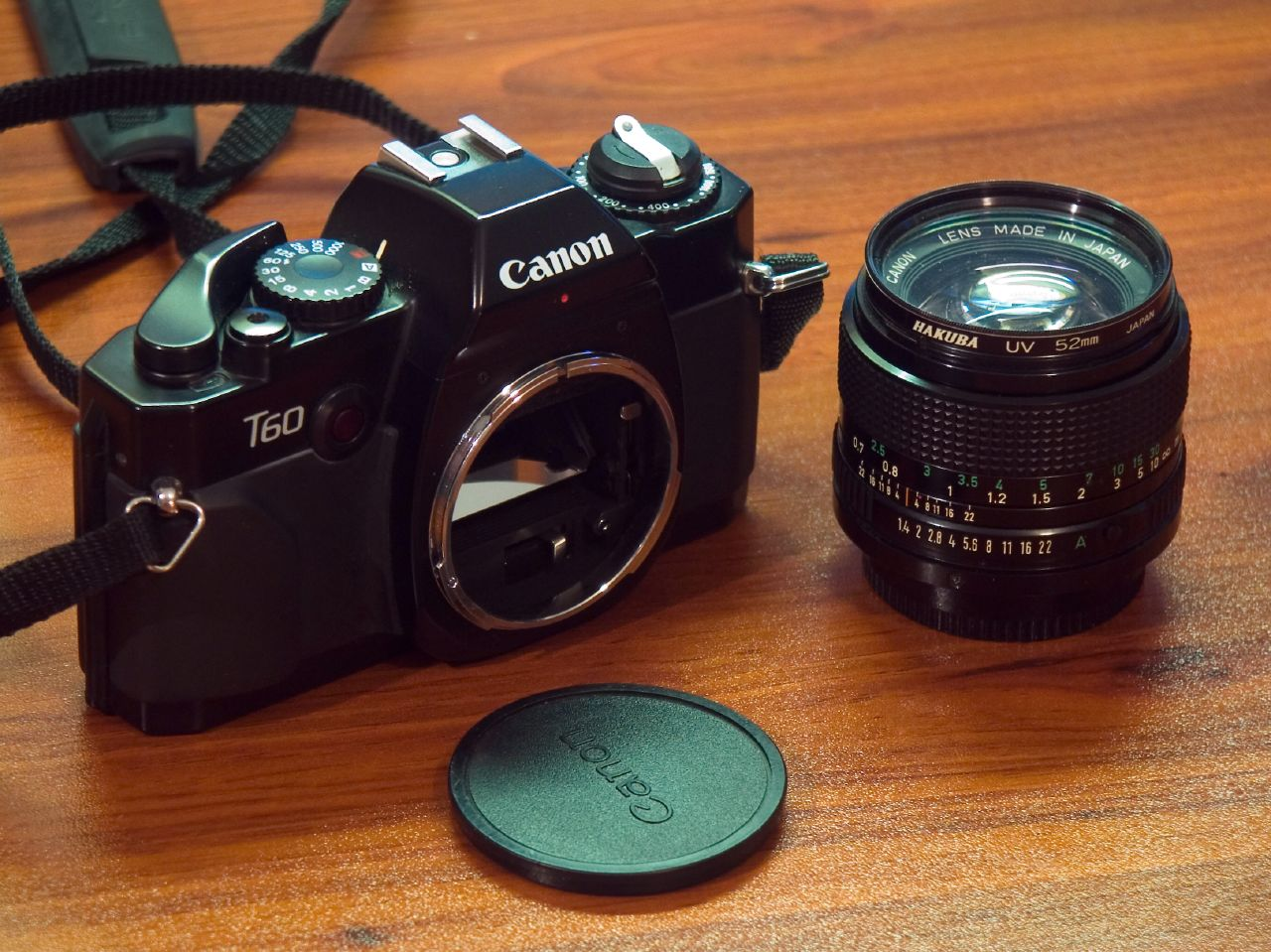
The Canon T60, another model based on the CT1 chassis

The Cosina CT-1 is a 35mm film SLR camera from Cosina Co.

In addition to being sold in its own right, the CT-1 chassis also forms the basis (with variations) of several SLR bodies including the Nikon FM10, the Canon T60, the Olympus OM-2000 and others, such as the Hanimex DR-1 Super. It fulfilled better-known manufacturers' desire to offer a low-end "no-frills" manual film SLR without having to manufacture it themselves.

Models sold under other brand names known to share the chassis and possibly the whole mechanisms and electronics etc.: Canon T60, Carena CX-300, Chinon CM-7, Olympus OM-2000, Nikon FE10, Nikon FM10, Petri GX-1, Petri GX-2, Revue AC2, Revue SC3, Ricoh KR-5 SUPER II (2).

The CT-1 chassis is also often, mistakenly, referred to as the basis of some other cameras such as the Yashica FX-3 and the Centon K100 (which, in itself, is often, incorrectly, said to be an updated Pentax K1000) but, although the FX-3 etc. uses a similar chassis, also from Cosina, it's not the same.
