= Canon T50 =

35mm film camera

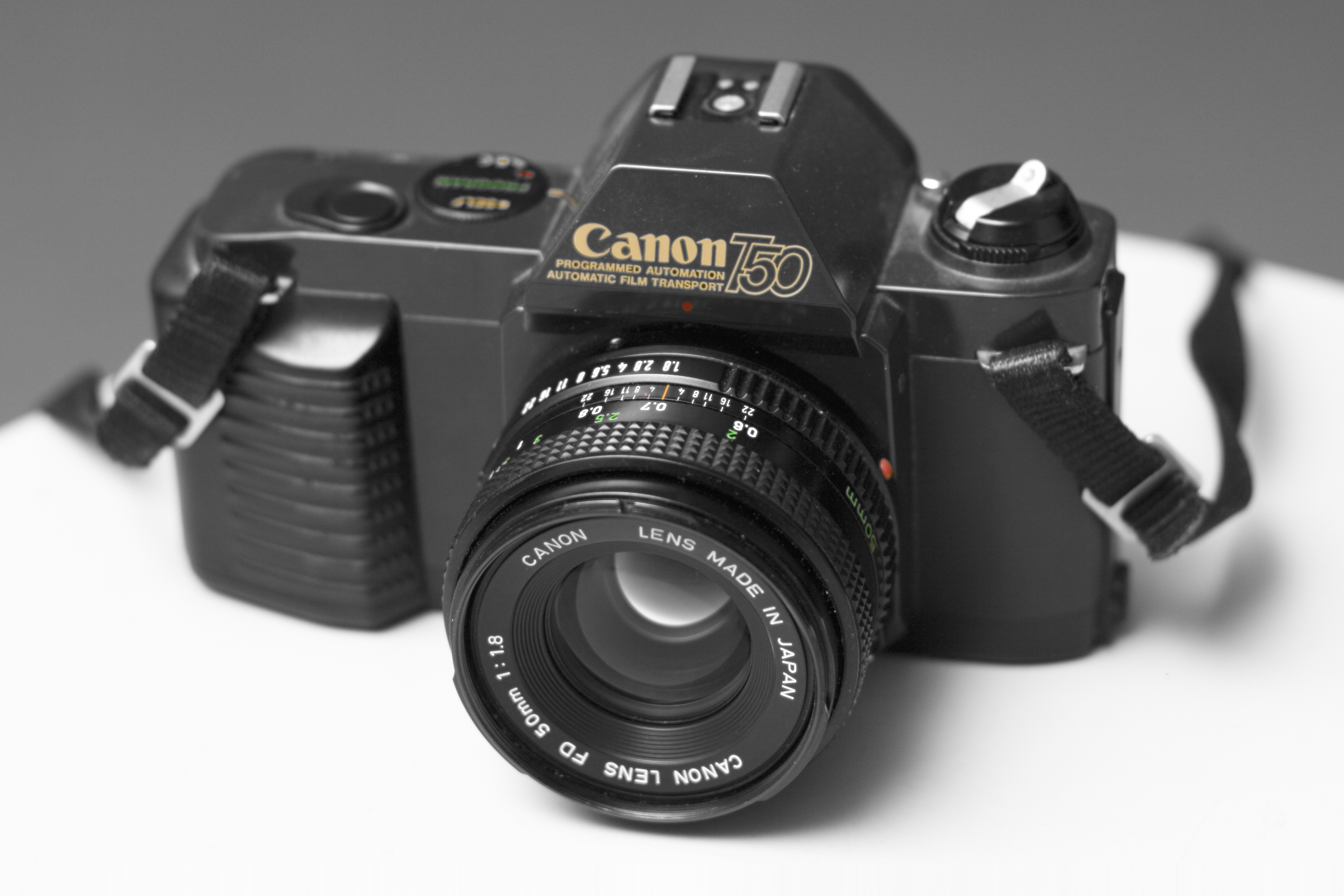
- The Canon T50 with FD 50 mm f/1.8 lens.

Overview
- Maker: Canon Inc.
- Type: 35mm SLR

Lens
- Lens mount: Canon FD lens mount

Flash
- Flash: None

General
- Dimensions: 150×87×48 mm (5.9×3.4×1.9 in), 490 g (1.08 lb)

The Canon T50, introduced in March 1983 and discontinued in December 1989, was the first in Canon's new T series of 35mm single-lens reflex cameras compatible with Canon's FD lens mount. SLR sales were falling in 1983 from the market's 1981 peak, and Canon chose to try greater automation to revive sales and remain competitive. This approach had found favor in compact cameras such as the AF35M "Autoboy" (Japan) or "Sure Shot" (US). The T50 had a power winder built in giving a continuous shooting rate of 1.4 frames per second, as well as an advanced auto-exposure mode, although it was still a manual focus camera. Unlike those compact cameras and the higher-end models in the T series, the T50 did not have power rewind, relying on a manual crank. The camera's electric systems were powered by two AA batteries in the grip, which gave enough power to shoot 75 24-exposure rolls, or 50 36-exposure rolls.

The T50 used a new shutter design. Canon's previous A series cameras used a horizontally travelling cloth shutter, while the T50 (and subsequent T series models) used a vertically travelling metal blade shutter which allowed for faster shutter speeds and higher flash X-sync speeds. Only a modest increase was seen in the T50; more would be available in subsequent cameras.

Only Program AE (Auto Exposure) mode was available on the T50, in line with its role as a simple beginner's camera. A couple of years earlier, Konica had tried a similar approach with their FP-1.

Canon released a new flash unit for the T50, the Speedlite 244T. This simple-to-use flash used an infrared preflash to judge the distance to the subject, and only had two buttons; a power switch and a film speed setting which toggled between 100 and 400 ISO film speed.

	1971	1972	1973	1974	1975	1976	1977	1978	1979	1980	1981	1982	1983	1984	1985	1986	1987	1988	1989	1990	1991	1992	1993
Professional																T90							
Professional		F-1 High Speed Motor Drive Camera												New F-1 High Speed Motor Drive Camera									
Professional	F-1						F-1N / F-1 (Later Model)					New F-1											
Amateur				EF					A-1														
Amateur															T70								
Amateur	FTb			FTb-N			AE-1					AE-1 Program											
Amateur					TLb					AV-1			AL-1			T80							
Amateur					TX		AT-1							T50							T60		
