= Manual focus =

In the field of photography, a manual focus camera is one in which the user has to adjust the focus of the lens by hand. Before the advent of autofocus, all cameras had manually adjusted focusing; thus, the term is a retronym.

The focus itself may be adjusted in a variety of ways. Larger view cameras and the like slide the lens closer or further from the film plane on rails; on smaller cameras, a focus ring on the lens is often rotated to move the lens elements by means of a helical screw. Other systems include levers on the lens or on the camera body.

There are a number of ways in which focus may be determined. Simplest is using a distance scale and measuring or estimating distance to the subject. Other methods include the rangefinder, which uses triangulation to determine the distance. On other cameras, the photographer examines the focus directly by means of a focusing screen. On the view camera, this ground glass is placed where the film will ultimately go, and is replaced by a sheet of film once focus is correct. Twin lens reflex cameras use two lenses that are mechanically linked, one for focusing and the other to take the photograph. Single lens reflex cameras, meanwhile, use the same objective lens for both purposes, with a mirror to direct the light to either the focusing screen or the film.

Focusing screens, in their simplest form, consist of a matte glass or plastic surface on which the image can be focused. Other devices, such as split-image prisms or microprisms, can help determine focus.

Manual focus lenses can also be used on modern digital cameras with an adapter. Zeiss, Leica and Cosina Voigtländer are among current manufacturers who continue to make manual lenses in lens mounts native to modern cameras.
