= Olympus M.Zuiko Digital ED 40-150mm f/4-5.6 =

M.Zuiko Digital ED 40-150mm f4-5.6
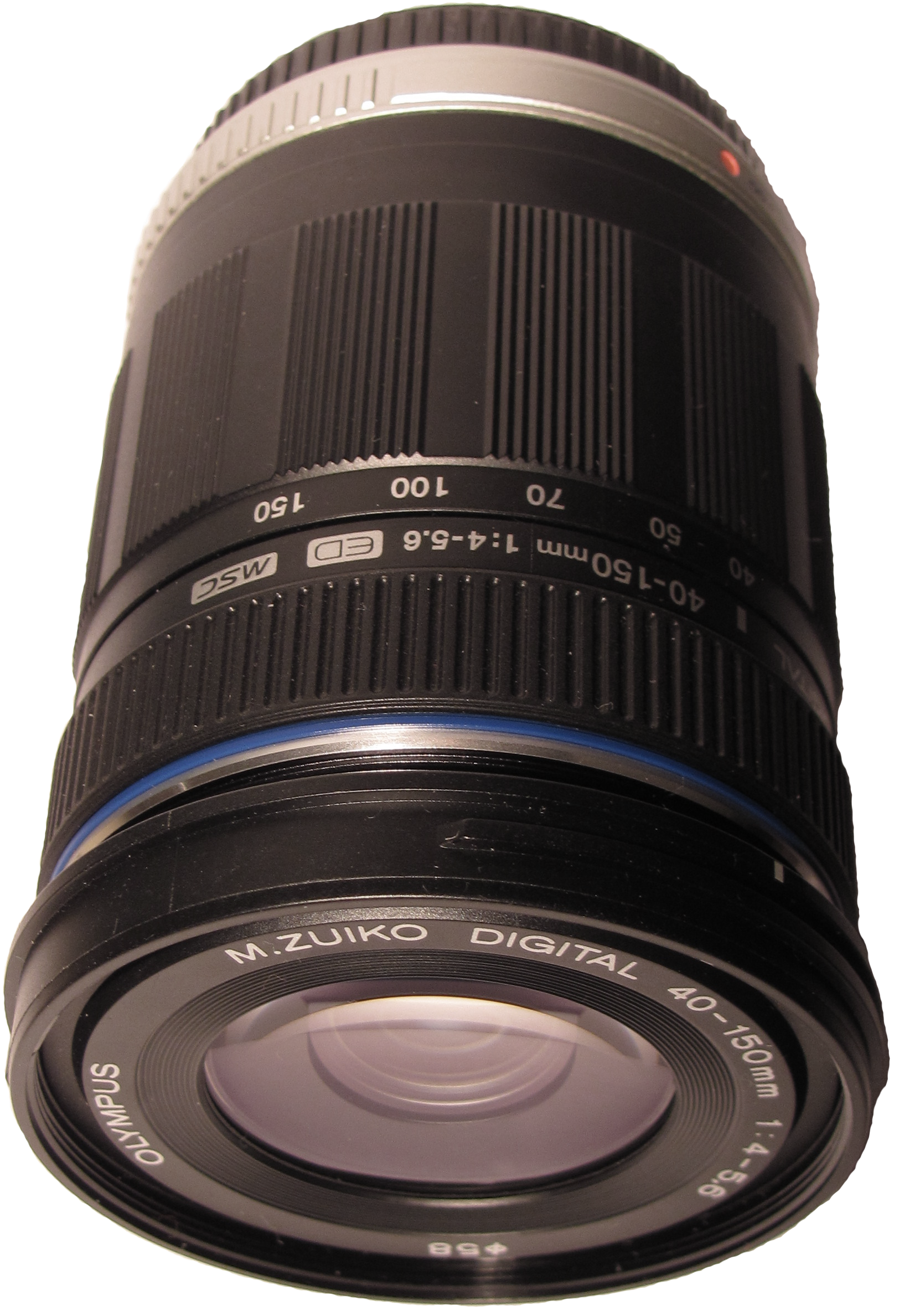
- Maker: Olympus Corporation

Technical data
- Type: Telephoto Zoom
- Focal length: 40-150mm
- Focal length (35mm equiv.): 80-300mm
- Crop factor: 30 - 8.2 degrees
- Aperture (max/min): f/4.0-5.6 - f/22
- Close focus distance: 0.9m
- Max. magnification: 0.16x(35mm equiv 0.32x)
- Construction: 13 elements in 10 groups

Features
- Lens-based stabilization: No No
- Macro capable: No No

Physical
- Max. length: 43.5 mm (1.17 in)
- Diameter: 63.5 mm
- Weight: 190g (6.7 oz)
- Filter diameter: Ø58mm

History
- Introduction: September 2010

The M.Zuiko Digital ED 40-150mm f/4.0-5.6 is a Micro Four Thirds System lens by Olympus Corporation. It is sold as a standalone item, and also as part of a kit along with bodies for all cameras in the Olympus PEN series (the discontinued E-P1 and the current E-P2, E-PL1, E-PL2, E-P3, E-PL3, E-PM1, E-PM2 and E-PL5).

The lens is available in black or silver. An updated "r" variant is available which appears to have identical basic characteristics and only minor cosmetic differences.
