= Olympus PEN E-PL5 =

Olympus Pen E-PL5
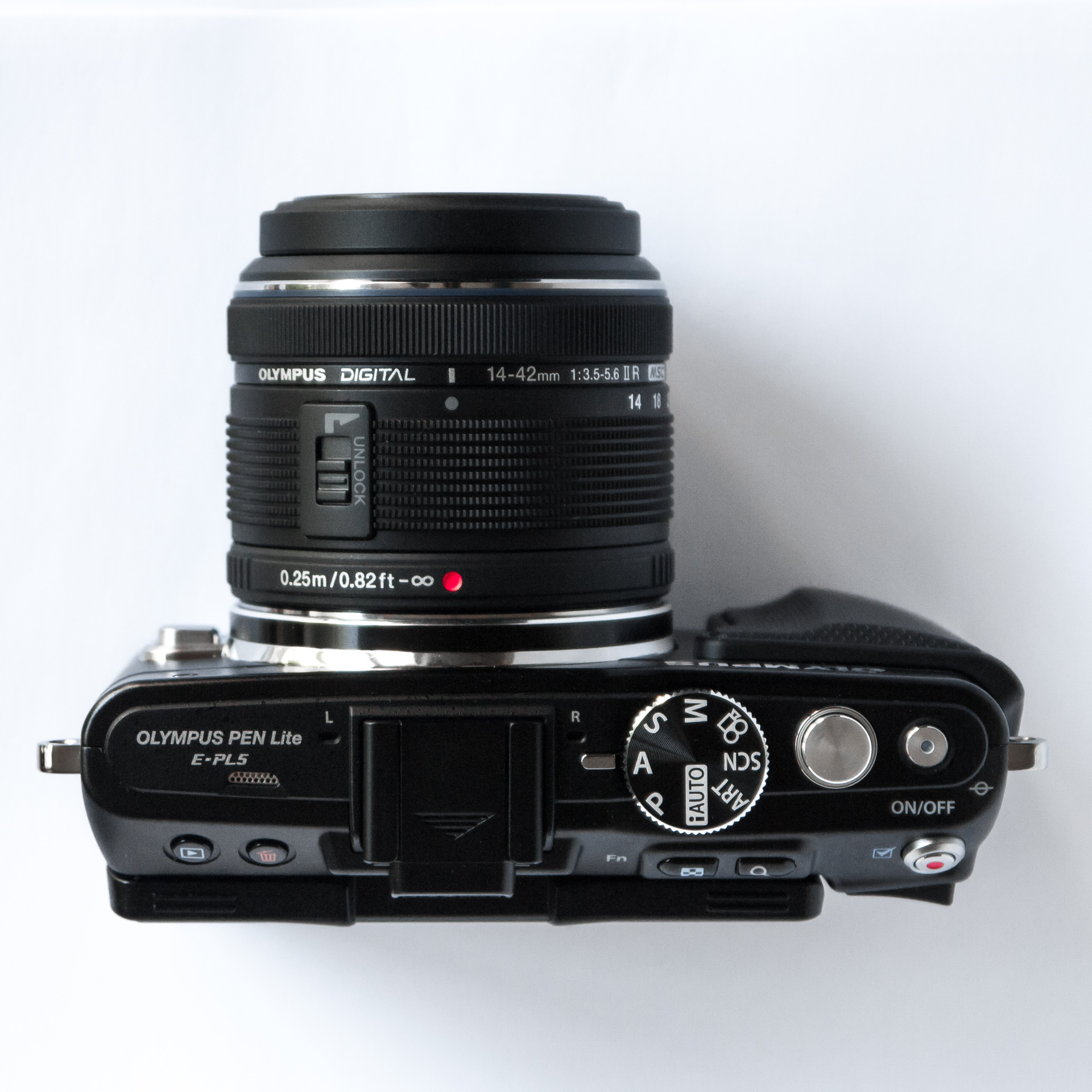

Overview
- Maker: Olympus Corporation
- Type: Micro Four Thirds, interchangeable lens camera

Lens
- Lens: Micro Four Thirds System mount

Sensor/medium
- Sensor: Four Thirds System 18.00 × 13.50 mm Live MOS
- Maximum resolution: 4608 x 3456 (16.1 megapixels)
- Film speed: ISO 200–25600
- Storage media: Secure Digital card; SDHC; SDXC

Focusing
- Focus modes: Single, continuous, manual
- Focus areas: 35 area contrast detect auto-focus, selectable

Exposure/metering
- Exposure modes: Program, shutter-priority, aperture-priority, manual
- Exposure metering: Digital ESP metering, Centre weighted average metering, Spot metering
- Metering modes: TTL ESP multi patterned (324-area multi pattern metering), Center-weighted average, Spot (1%)

Flash
- Flash: Clip-on (included), TTL, GN 10m equivalent (ISO200 · m); hotshoe for external flash attachment

Shutter
- Shutter: 1/4,000 to 60 s, up to 30 minutes bulb
- Continuous shooting: 8.0 frames/s (in case of "I.S. OFF")

Viewfinder
- Viewfinder: live preview, optional electronic viewfinder VF-2; optional electronic viewfinder VF-3 and VF-4; optional optical viewfinder VF-1

General
- LCD screen: 3" 460,000 pixel TFT LCD on screen with live preview with capacitive touchscreen control
- Battery: Olympus BLS-5 Lithium-ion battery
- Dimensions: 110.5×63.7×38.2 mm (4.35×2.51×1.50 in) (4.35" * 2.51" * 1.50")
- Weight: 279 g (9.8 oz) (body only) 325 g (11.5 oz) (body, battery and SD memory card)

The Olympus PEN E-PL5, announced on September 17, 2012 is Olympus Corporation's tenth camera that adheres to the Micro Four Thirds (MFT) system design standard. The E-PL5 succeeds the Olympus PEN E-PL3, and was announced in concert with one other model, the Olympus PEN E-PM2 (a simpler version of the PEN E-PL5 and the successor to the E-PM1).

== Technology ==
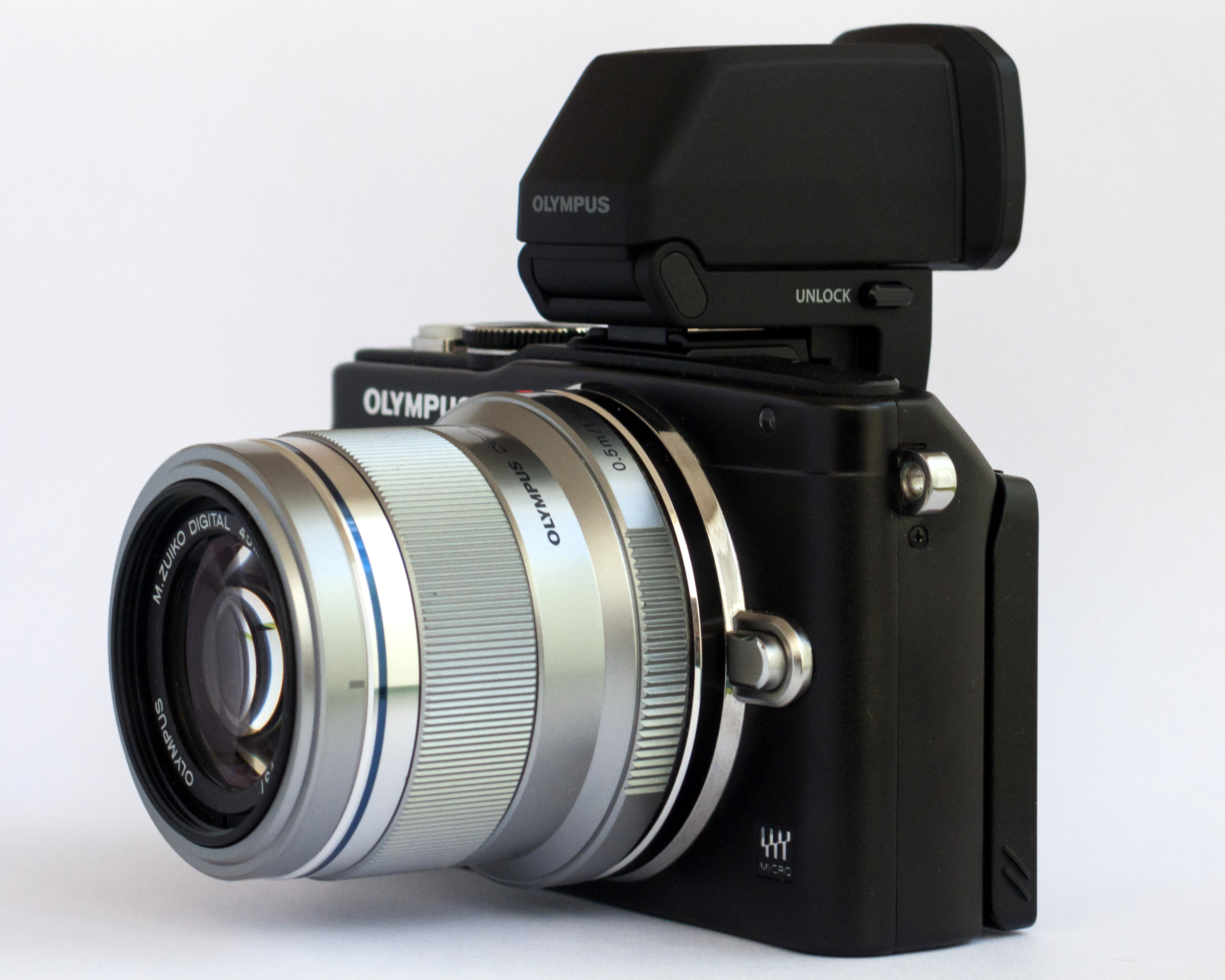
The E-PL5 with VF-4 viewfinder and Olympus M.Zuiko Digital ED 45mm f/1.8 lens

The E-PL5, together with the E-PM2, features a touchscreen, similar to the Olympus PEN E-P3 and Olympus OM-D E-M5, and the same 16.1 megapixel sensor as is in the OM-D E-M5, with its increased ISO range, low-light capability and wide dynamic range. Although the Olympus E-PL5 uses the same sensor as the OM-D E-M5, it lacks the 5 axis stabilisation system of the latter such as OM-D and E-P5, utilising a simpler system 2 axis stabilisation that only compensates for yaw and pitch.

The E-PL5 increases autofocus speed through use of a 240 Hz refresh rate for its sensor, similar to the technology used in its flagship MFT camera, the OM-D E-M5. The benefits of the 240 Hz refresh rate also provides the ability for continuous autofocus tracking during bursts of exposures, a faster shutter response (less lag) and less blackout time between exposures.

The E-PL5 has a capacitive touchscreen similar to E-P3 and OM-D E-M5 for creative camera control, but lacks an OLED type display that is supposed to vastly improve performance in sunny conditions, and off-angle viewing. Instead, the E-PL5 has a tiltable LCD, which allows easy above the head, waist level, low off the ground viewing and self-portraits, but no viewfinder. With no built-in flash, but sold with clip-on flash, the E-PL5 continues with the proprietary Accessory Port, a power and communication port, which allows the use of various accessories, such as other external flash, an external stereo microphone for HD video recording, LED macro lights, and a bluetooth communications adapter. The accessory port is compatible with the optional hotshoe mounted VF-2, VF-3 and VF-4 electronic viewfinders (EVF).

== Differences over Olympus PEN E-PL3 ==
- 16.1 megapixel sensor instead of 12.3 megapixel
- Option to reduce the size of the focus points
- For the first time, Olympus gives priority over its own in-body system to lens-based image stabilisation when Panasonic lenses with this feature are mounted
- 170 degree "flip-up" capacitative touchscreen
- Detachable grip
- New "Water Colour" Art Filter in addition to the 11 existing Art Filters of the E-PL3.

== Specifications not in the infobox ==
- 1080 Full HD video at 30p frames per second

== See also ==
- Olympus PEN E-PL3
- Olympus OM-D E-M5

Preceded by Olympus PEN E-PL3	Olympus PEN E-PL5 Micro Four Thirds System Camera; Autumn 2012–present	Succeeded by Olympus PEN E-PL6

Brand	Form	Class	2008	2009	2010	2011			2012	2013	2014	2015	2016	2017	2018	2019	2020	2021	2022	2023	2024	2025
Olympus	SLR style OM-D	Professional															E-M1X ^{R}					
Olympus	SLR style OM-D	High-end									E-M1			E-M1 II ^{R}			E-M1 III ^{R}					
Olympus	SLR style OM-D	Advanced							E-M5			E-M5 II ^{R}					E-M5 III ^{R}					
Olympus	SLR style OM-D	Mid-range									E-M10		E-M10 II		E-M10 III			E-M10 IV				
Olympus	Rangefinder style PEN	Mid-range		E-P1	E-P2		E-P3				E-P5		PEN-F ^{R}									
Olympus	Rangefinder style PEN	Upper-entry			E-PL1	E-PL2		E-PL3	E-PL5		E-PL6	E-PL7		E-PL8	E-PL9		E-PL10					
Olympus	Rangefinder style PEN	Entry-level					E-PM1		E-PM2													
Olympus	remote													Air								
OM System	SLR style	Professional																	OM-1 ^{R}		OM-1 II ^{R}	
OM System	SLR style	High-end																				OM-3 ^{R}
OM System	SLR style	Advanced																		OM-5 ^{R}		OM-5 II ^{R}
OM System	PEN	Mid-range																	E-P7			
Panasonic	SLR style	High-end Video													GH5S				GH6 ^{R}			GH7 ^{R}
Panasonic	SLR style	High-end Photo													G9 ^{R}						G9 II ^{R}	
Panasonic	SLR style	High-end		GH1		GH2			GH3		GH4				GH5				GH5II			
Panasonic	SLR style	Mid-range		G1	G2		G3		G5		G6		G7	G80/G85			G90/G95					
Panasonic	SLR style	Entry-level			G10													G100			G100D	
Panasonic	Rangefinder style	Advanced							GX1		GX7		GX8		GX9							
Panasonic	Rangefinder style	Mid-range									GM1	GM5	GX80/GX85									
Panasonic	Rangefinder style	Entry-level			GF1	GF2	GF3		GF5		GF6	GF7	GF8	GX800/GX850/GF9		GX880/GF10/GF90						
Panasonic	Camcorder	Professional							AG-AF104													
Kodak	Rangefinder style	Entry-level										S-1										
DJI	Drone	.												Zenmuse X5S								
DJI	Drone	.												Zenmuse X5								
YI	Rangefinder style	Entry-level												M1								
Yongnuo	Rangefinder style	Android camera															YN450M		YN455			
Blackmagic Design	Rangefinder style	High-End Video							Cinema Camera													
Blackmagic Design	Rangefinder style	High-End Video									Pocket Cinema Camera					Pocket Cinema Camera 4K						
Blackmagic Design		High-End Video										Micro Cinema Camera									Micro Studio Camera 4K G2	
Z CAM	Cinema	Advanced											E1			E2						
Z CAM	Cinema	Mid-Range																E2-M4				
Z CAM	Cinema	Entry-Level															E2C					
JVC	Camcorder	Professional										GY-LS300										
SVS-Vistek		Industrial							EVO Tracer													
