= Olympus PEN E-PL7 =

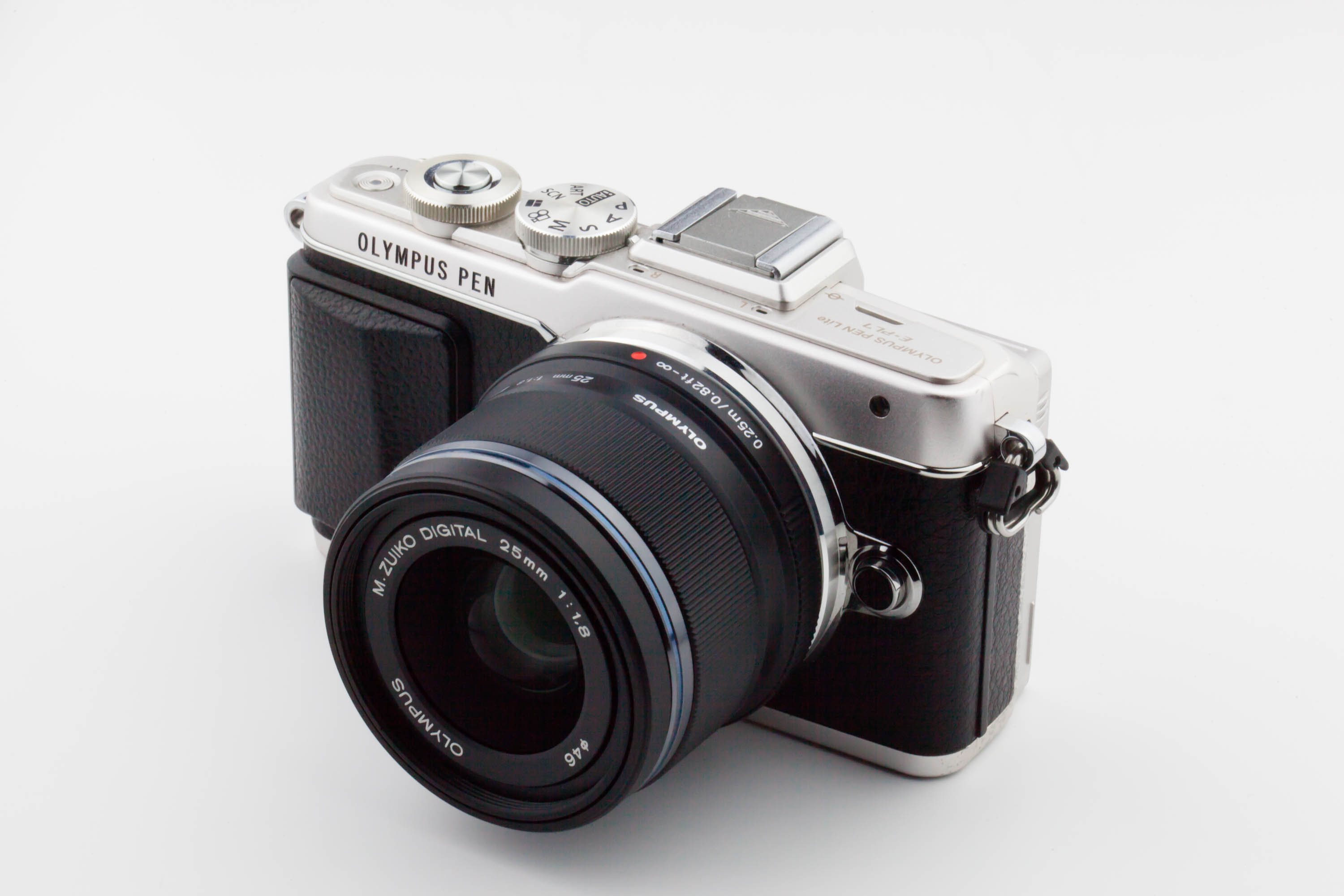
- Olympus E-PL7 with 25mm f/1.8 lens

Overview
- Maker: Olympus Corp.
- Type: Mirrorless camera

Lens
- Lens mount: Micro Four Thirds

Sensor/medium
- Sensor type: CMOS
- Sensor size: 17.3 x 13mm (Four Thirds type)
- Maximum resolution: 4608 x 3456 (16 megapixels)
- Film speed: ISO 100-25600
- Recording medium: RAW, JPEG (Super fine, fine, normal, basic)
- Storage media: SD, SDHC or SDXC memory card

Focusing
- Focus: Contrast Detect AF with built-in 2x digital Focal length multiplier
- Focus areas: 81 focus points

Flash
- Flash: External flash included (GN7 @ ISO 100)

Shutter
- Shutter speeds: 60s to 1/4000s (1/16,000 with e-shutter)
- Continuous shooting: 8.7 frames per second

Image processing
- Image processor: TruePic VII
- White balance: Auto, 7 presets
- WB bracketing: Yes (3 frames in 2/4/6 stops in A-B/G-M axis)

General
- Video recording: Motion JPEG H.264, 1920 x 1080 (30p), 1280 x 720 (30p), 640 x 480 (30 fps)
- LCD screen: 3 inch touch LCD with 1,037,000 dots; articulated
- Battery: Lithium-ion battery (BLS-50), 350 shots (CIPA)
- AV port(s): micro-HDMI
- Data port(s): USB 2.0, Built-in WiFi 802.11b/g/n Remote control (wired or via smartphone)
- Dimensions: 115 x 67 x 38mm (4.53 x 2.64 x 1.5 inches)
- Weight: 357 g (13 oz) including battery

The Olympus PEN E-PL7 is a rangefinder-styled digital mirrorless interchangeable lens camera announced by Olympus Corp. on August 28, 2014. It succeeds the Olympus PEN E-PL6. The E-PL7 was succeeded by the Olympus PEN E-PL8 that was announced on September 19, 2016.

== Differences between E-PL7 and E-PL6/5 ==
- Flip down "selfie" capacitative touchscreen
- Touch screen UI is available in most of the UI, including focus point selection, focus magnification, tap to focus/capture etc.
- Screen resolution changed from 460K dots to 1037K dots /480*320 to 720*480
- Newer AF system with 81 points instead of 35, practically giving it the same contrast detection system like in the more professional choices in the lineup, but lacks a phase-detection system.
- Manual focusing is assisted by focus peaking, which enables easy focusing with any manual lens.
- Comprehensive Wi-Fi feature, which enables communication with any Wi-Fi capable web device, and allows complete control over camera features when used with Android or iOS and a relevant app.
- Geo-tagging pictures when captured through the O.I share app

| Brand | Form | Class | 2008 | 2009 | 2010 | 2011 | | | 2012 | 2013 | 2014 | 2015 | 2016 | 2017 | 2018 | 2019 | 2020 | 2021 | 2022 | 2023 | 2024 | 25 |
| Olympus | SLR style OM-D | Professional | | | | | | | | | | | | | | | E-M1X ^{R} | | | | | |
| Olympus | SLR style OM-D | High-end | | | | | | | | | E-M1 | | | E-M1 II ^{R} | | | E-M1 III ^{R} | | | | | |
| Olympus | SLR style OM-D | Advanced | | | | | | | E-M5 | | | E-M5 II ^{R} | | | | | E-M5 III ^{R} | | | | | |
| Olympus | SLR style OM-D | Mid-range | | | | | | | | | E-M10 | | E-M10 II | | E-M10 III | | | E-M10 IV | | | | |
| Olympus | Rangefinder style PEN | Mid-range | | E-P1 | E-P2 | | E-P3 | | | | E-P5 | | PEN-F ^{R} | | | | | | | | | |
| Olympus | Rangefinder style PEN | Upper-entry | | | E-PL1 | E-PL2 | | E-PL3 | E-PL5 | | E-PL6 | E-PL7 | | E-PL8 | E-PL9 | | E-PL10 | | | | | |
| Olympus | Rangefinder style PEN | Entry-level | | | | | E-PM1 | | E-PM2 | | | | | | | | | | | | | |
| Olympus | remote | | | | | | | | | | | | | Air | | | | | | | | |
| OM System | SLR style | Professional | | | | | | | | | | | | | | | | | OM-1 ^{R} | | OM-1 II ^{R} | |
| OM System | SLR style | High-end | | | | | | | | | | | | | | | | | | | | OM-3 ^{R} |
| OM System | SLR style | Advanced | | | | | | | | | | | | | | | | | | OM-5 ^{R} | | |
| OM System | PEN | Mid-range | | | | | | | | | | | | | | | | | E-P7 | | | |
| Panasonic | SLR style | High-end Video | | | | | | | | | | | | | GH5S | | | | GH6 ^{R} | | | GH7 ^{R} |
| Panasonic | SLR style | High-end Photo | | | | | | | | | | | | | G9 ^{R} | | | | | | G9 II ^{R} | |
| Panasonic | SLR style | High-end | | GH1 | | GH2 | | | GH3 | | GH4 | | | | GH5 | | | | GH5II | | | |
| Panasonic | SLR style | Mid-range | | G1 | G2 | | G3 | | G5 | | G6 | | G7 | G80/G85 | | | G90/G95 | | | | | |
| Panasonic | SLR style | Entry-level | | | G10 | | | | | | | | | | | | | G100 | | | G100D | |
| Panasonic | Rangefinder style | Advanced | | | | | | | GX1 | | GX7 | | GX8 | | GX9 | | | | | | | |
| Panasonic | Rangefinder style | Mid-range | | | | | | | | | GM1 | GM5 | GX80/GX85 | | | | | | | | | |
| Panasonic | Rangefinder style | Entry-level | | | GF1 | GF2 | GF3 | | GF5 | | GF6 | GF7 | GF8 | GX800/GX850/GF9 | | GX880/GF10/GF90 | | | | | | |
| Panasonic | Camcorder | Professional | | | | | | | AG-AF104 | | | | | | | | | | | | | |
| Kodak | Rangefinder style | Entry-level | | | | | | | | | | S-1 | | | | | | | | | | |
| DJI | Drone | . | | | | | | | | | | | | Zenmuse X5S | | | | | | | | |
| DJI | Drone | . | | | | | | | | | | | | Zenmuse X5 | | | | | | | | |
| YI | Rangefinder style | Entry-level | | | | | | | | | | | | M1 | | | | | | | | |
| Yongnuo | Rangefinder style | Android camera | | | | | | | | | | | | | | | YN450M | | YN455 | | | |
| Blackmagic Design | Rangefinder style | High-End Video | | | | | | | Cinema Camera | | | | | | | | | | | | | |
| Blackmagic Design | Rangefinder style | High-End Video | | | | | | | | | Pocket Cinema Camera | | | | | Pocket Cinema Camera 4K | | | | | | |
| Blackmagic Design | | High-End Video | | | | | | | | | | Micro Cinema Camera | | | | | | | | | Micro Studio Camera 4K G2 | |
| Z CAM | Cinema | Advanced | | | | | | | | | | | E1 | | | E2 | | | | | | |
| Z CAM | Cinema | Mid-Range | | | | | | | | | | | | | | | | E2-M4 | | | | |
| Z CAM | Cinema | Entry-Level | | | | | | | | | | | | | | | E2C | | | | | |
| JVC | Camcorder | Professional | | | | | | | | | | GY-LS300 | | | | | | | | | | |
| SVS-Vistek | | Industrial | | | | | | | EVO Tracer | | | | | | | | | | | | | |
