= Olympus PEN E-P2 =

2009 Four Thirds mirrorless camera

Olympus Pen E-P2
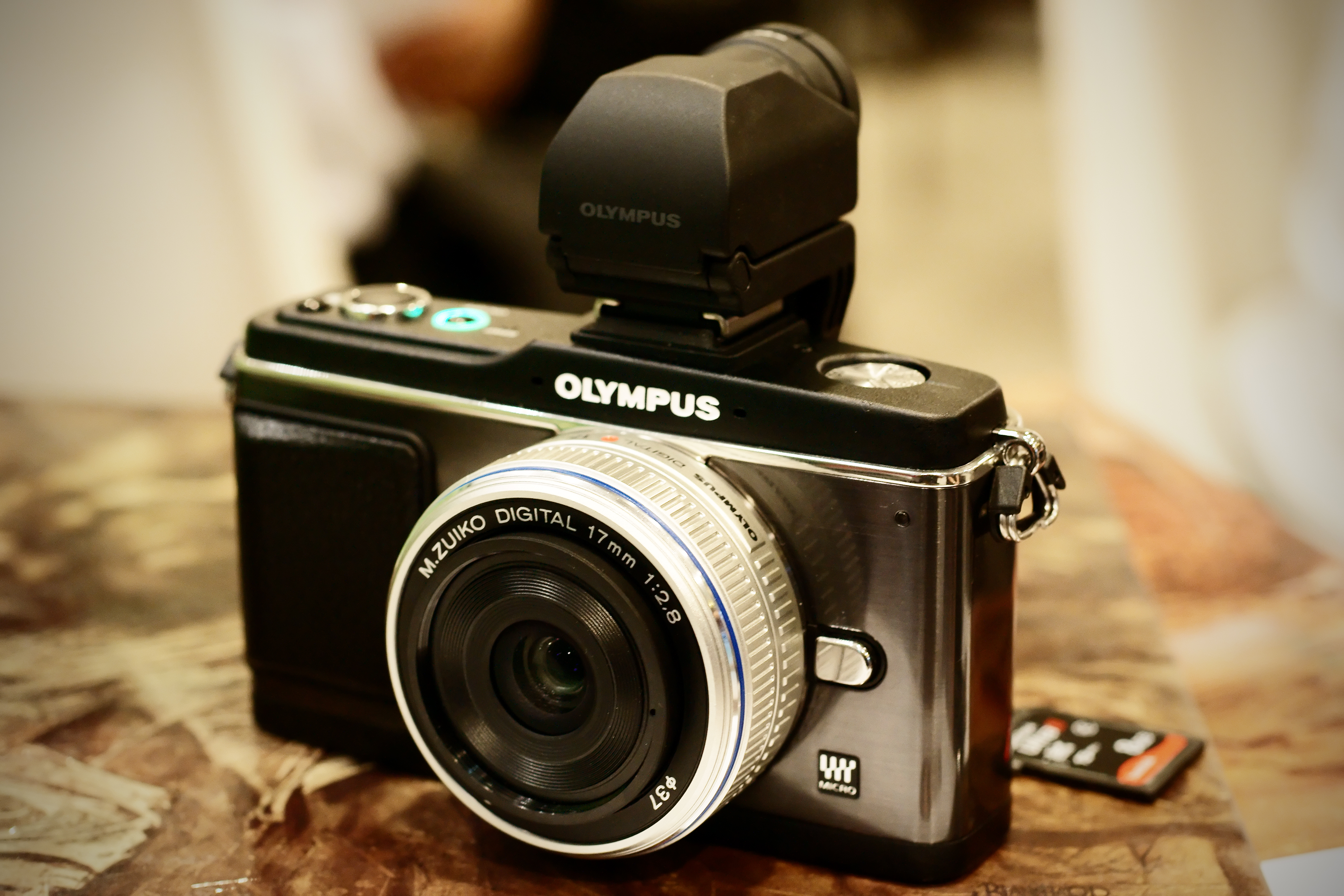
- Olympus PEN E-P2 shown with the Olympus M.Zuiko 17 mm lens and optional electronic viewfinder

Overview
- Maker: Olympus Corporation
- Type: Micro Four Thirds, interchangeable lens camera
- Intro price: $1199.99

Lens
- Lens: Micro Four Thirds system mount

Sensor/medium
- Sensor: Four Thirds System 18×13.50 mm Live MOS
- Maximum resolution: 4032×3024 (12.3 megapixels)
- Storage media: Secure Digital card

Focusing
- Focus modes: Single, continuous, manual
- Focus areas: 11 area contrast detect auto-focus, selectable

Exposure/metering
- Exposure modes: Program, shutter-priority, aperture-priority, manual
- Exposure metering: Digital ESP metering, Centre weighted average metering, Spot metering
- Metering modes: ESP multi patterned, center-weighted average (60%), spot (2%)

Flash
- Flash: hot shoe allows for external flashes

Shutter
- Shutter: 1/4,000 to 60 s, 30 minutes bulb
- Continuous shooting: 3 frame/s

Viewfinder
- Viewfinder: live preview
- Optional viewfinders: Olympus VF-1 (optical), Olympus VF-2 or VF-3 (electronic)

Image processing
- Image processor: TruePic V

General
- Video recording: 720p video at 30 frames per second (frame/s)
- LCD screen: 3-inch 230,000-pixel TFT LCD on screen with live preview
- Battery: Olympus BLS-1 Lithium-ion battery
- Dimensions: 121×70×36 mm (4.8×2.8×1.4 in) (4.7 * 2.8 * 1.4")
- Weight: 335 g (11.8 oz)

The Olympus Pen E-P2 announced on 5 November 2009 is Olympus Corporation's second camera that adheres to the Micro Four Thirds (MFT) system design standard. The E-P2 succeeds the Olympus Pen E-P1 a little over five months after the introduction of the EP-1.

== Features ==
The EP-2 addresses some of the concerns that critics had about the EP-1: slow autofocus speed and difficulty seeing the LCD panel under certain (e.g., bright, sunny) conditions.

The autofocus speed was addressed with a firmware update, and the introduction of new lenses, although critically, the autofocus speed does not improve much with the originally issued 14–42 mm ƒ/3.5–5.6 kit zoom lens (28–90 mm equivalent), or the 17 mm ƒ/2.8 (34 mm equivalent) pancake lens.

The EP-2 added an Accessory Port, a power and communication port, which allowed the use of various accessories, such as an external stereo microphone for HD video recording. However, the principal use of the accessory port was a new, high resolution, optional hotshoe mounted VF-2 electronic viewfinder (EVF). The VF-2 had a flip angle eyepiece, allowing viewing from 0–90 degrees. The high resolution VF-2 had specifications that matched the highly acclaimed built-in EVF on the Panasonic Lumix DMC-G1, the first MFT camera ever introduced.

In the United States the E-P2 MSRP with 14–42 mm kit zoom lens, and VF-2 EVF, was US$1,100. The accessory VF-2 EVF was also available separately for $280.00. Available body colors were black and silver.

== Differences from predecessor ==
The primary differences between the E-P2 as compared to the E-P1 which it replaced are:

- Addition of an Accessory Port that can be used for an electronic viewfinder or external microphone
- Two new Art filters-simulating Diorama and Cross process in camera
- Black finish widely available, silver finish available in Japan
- Auto focus tracking
- Colour boosting function named i-Enhance

== Successor Model ==
The E-P2 was replaced in Olympus' PEN line by the Olympus PEN E-P3 which was announced in June 2011.

== See also ==
- Olympus PEN E-PL1

Preceded by Olympus PEN E-P1	Olympus PEN Micro Four Thirds System cameras November 2008–present	Succeeded by Olympus PEN E-P3

Brand	Form	Class	2008	2009	2010	2011			2012	2013	2014	2015	2016	2017	2018	2019	2020	2021	2022	2023	2024	2025
Olympus	SLR style OM-D	Professional															E-M1X ^{R}					
Olympus	SLR style OM-D	High-end									E-M1			E-M1 II ^{R}			E-M1 III ^{R}					
Olympus	SLR style OM-D	Advanced							E-M5			E-M5 II ^{R}					E-M5 III ^{R}					
Olympus	SLR style OM-D	Mid-range									E-M10		E-M10 II		E-M10 III			E-M10 IV				
Olympus	Rangefinder style PEN	Mid-range		E-P1	E-P2		E-P3				E-P5		PEN-F ^{R}									
Olympus	Rangefinder style PEN	Upper-entry			E-PL1	E-PL2		E-PL3	E-PL5		E-PL6	E-PL7		E-PL8	E-PL9		E-PL10					
Olympus	Rangefinder style PEN	Entry-level					E-PM1		E-PM2													
Olympus	remote													Air								
OM System	SLR style	Professional																	OM-1 ^{R}		OM-1 II ^{R}	
OM System	SLR style	High-end																				OM-3 ^{R}
OM System	SLR style	Advanced																		OM-5 ^{R}		OM-5 II ^{R}
OM System	PEN	Mid-range																	E-P7			
Panasonic	SLR style	High-end Video													GH5S				GH6 ^{R}			GH7 ^{R}
Panasonic	SLR style	High-end Photo													G9 ^{R}						G9 II ^{R}	
Panasonic	SLR style	High-end		GH1		GH2			GH3		GH4				GH5				GH5II			
Panasonic	SLR style	Mid-range		G1	G2		G3		G5		G6		G7	G80/G85			G90/G95					
Panasonic	SLR style	Entry-level			G10													G100			G100D	
Panasonic	Rangefinder style	Advanced							GX1		GX7		GX8		GX9							
Panasonic	Rangefinder style	Mid-range									GM1	GM5	GX80/GX85									
Panasonic	Rangefinder style	Entry-level			GF1	GF2	GF3		GF5		GF6	GF7	GF8	GX800/GX850/GF9		GX880/GF10/GF90						
Panasonic	Camcorder	Professional							AG-AF104													
Kodak	Rangefinder style	Entry-level										S-1										
DJI	Drone	.												Zenmuse X5S								
DJI	Drone	.												Zenmuse X5								
YI	Rangefinder style	Entry-level												M1								
Yongnuo	Rangefinder style	Android camera															YN450M		YN455			
Blackmagic Design	Rangefinder style	High-End Video							Cinema Camera													
Blackmagic Design	Rangefinder style	High-End Video									Pocket Cinema Camera					Pocket Cinema Camera 4K						
Blackmagic Design		High-End Video										Micro Cinema Camera									Micro Studio Camera 4K G2	
Z CAM	Cinema	Advanced											E1			E2						
Z CAM	Cinema	Mid-Range																E2-M4				
Z CAM	Cinema	Entry-Level															E2C					
JVC	Camcorder	Professional										GY-LS300										
SVS-Vistek		Industrial							EVO Tracer													
