= Olympus PEN E-PL1 =

Olympus Pen E-PL1
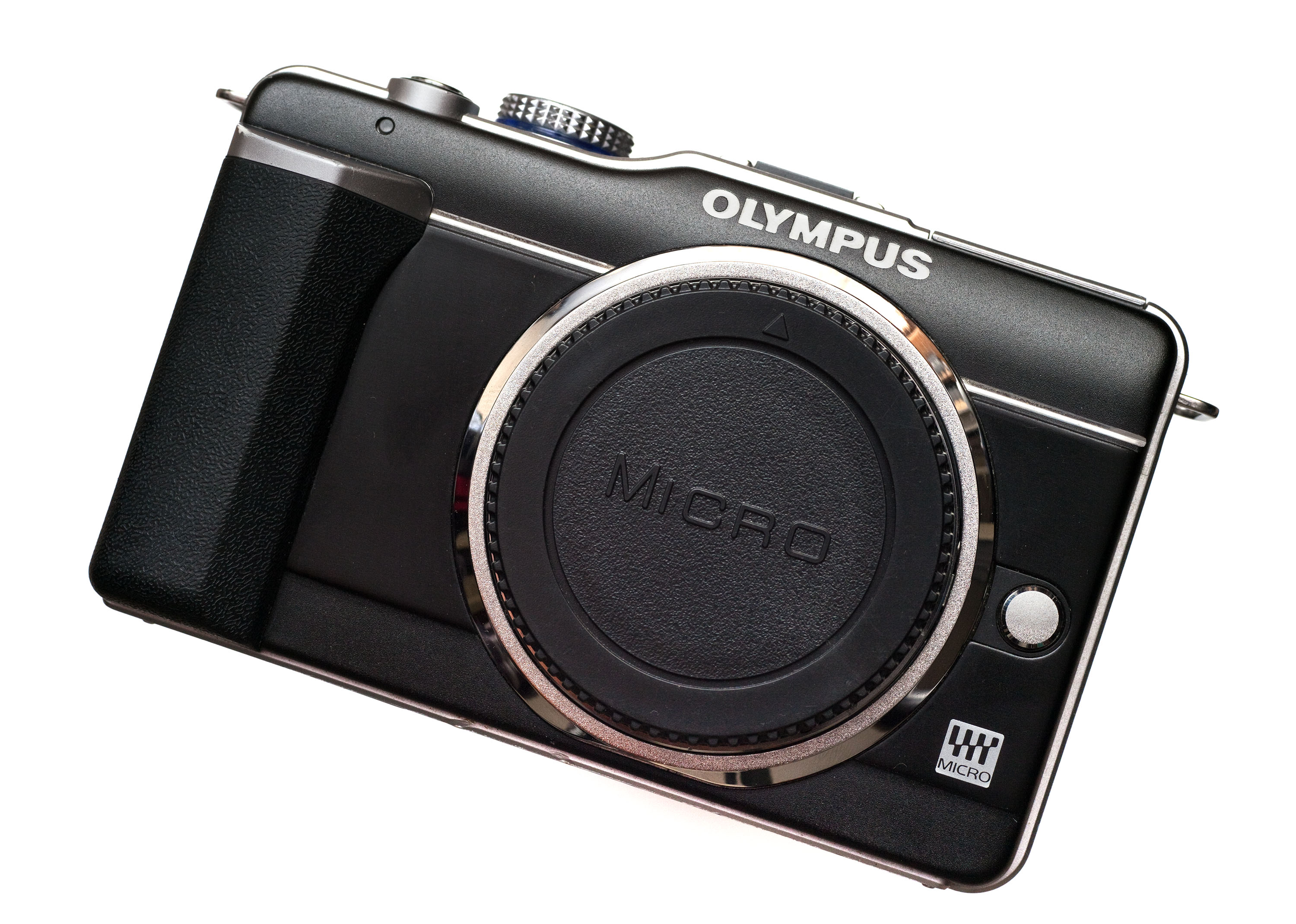
- Olympus PEN E-PL1

Overview
- Maker: Olympus Corporation
- Type: Micro Four Thirds, interchangeable lens camera

Lens
- Lens: Micro Four Thirds system mount

Sensor/medium
- Sensor: Four Thirds system 17.3 × 13.0 mm Live MOS
- Maximum resolution: 4032×3024 (12.3 megapixels)
- Storage media: Secure Digital card

Focusing
- Focus modes: Single, continuous, manual
- Focus areas: 11 area contrast detect auto-focus, selectable

Exposure/metering
- Exposure modes: Program, shutter-priority, aperture-priority, manual
- Metering modes: ESP multi patterned, Center-weighted average (60%), Spot (2%)

Flash
- Flash: Yes, also hot shoe allows for a variety of external flashes

Shutter
- Shutter: 1/2,000 to 60 s – 30 minutes bulb
- Continuous shooting: 3 frame/s

Viewfinder
- Viewfinder: live preview
- Optional viewfinders: Olympus VF-1 (optical), Olympus VF-2 or VF-3 (electronic)

Image processing
- Image processor: TruePic V

General
- Video recording: 720p video at 30 frames per second (frame/s) using M-JPEG
- LCD screen: 2.7" 230,000 pixel TFT LCD on screen with live preview
- Battery: BLS-1 - Li-ion 7,2V 1150mAh
- Dimensions: 115×72×42 mm (4.5×2.8×1.7 in)
- Weight: 334 g (12 oz) (0.736 lb)
- Made in: China

The Olympus PEN E-PL1 is a digital camera made by Olympus announced on 3 February 2010 and replaced in 2011. It was Olympus's third camera using the Micro Four Thirds system after the Olympus PEN E-P1 and Olympus PEN E-P2, and the first camera in Olympus' "PEN Lite" line.

== Features ==
The PEN E-PL1 was the lowest-cost Micro Four Third camera available at launch, with a US dollar MSRP of $500.

In terms of market, DPReview considered the E-PL1 more aimed at the point-and-shoot (compact camera) market, rather than the DSLR market (like the E-P1 & E-P2) – more of a large-sensor compact than a small format DSLR. In DPReview's opinion the E-PL1 was easy to use in automatic mode, but due to the small number of dedicated dials and buttons, it could be more awkward to use in manual modes compared to a DSLR.

A slightly updated E-PL1s was introduced in November 2010. The E-PL1s offered increased maximum ISO sensitivity and shipped with a slightly higher capacity battery and an updated version of the kit 14-42mm lens.

== Differences from E-P1/E-P2 ==
- Built-in flash
- Support for VF-2 electronic viewfinder (over E-P1). VF-3 support with firmware update.
- Mono rather than stereo microphone.
- Direct movie record button.
- Simplified control scheme.
- No wireless/wired shutter release capability

== Successor Model ==
The E-PL1/E-PL1s were replaced in Olympus' PEN Lite line by the Olympus PEN E-PL2 which was announced in January 2011. The Olympus PEN E-PL3 was introduced in June 2011 and finally the Olympus PEN E-PL5 was introduced in September 2012. There was no E-PL4 in the line, as the number 4 is nearly homophonous to the word "death" and considered bad luck in Japanese culture.

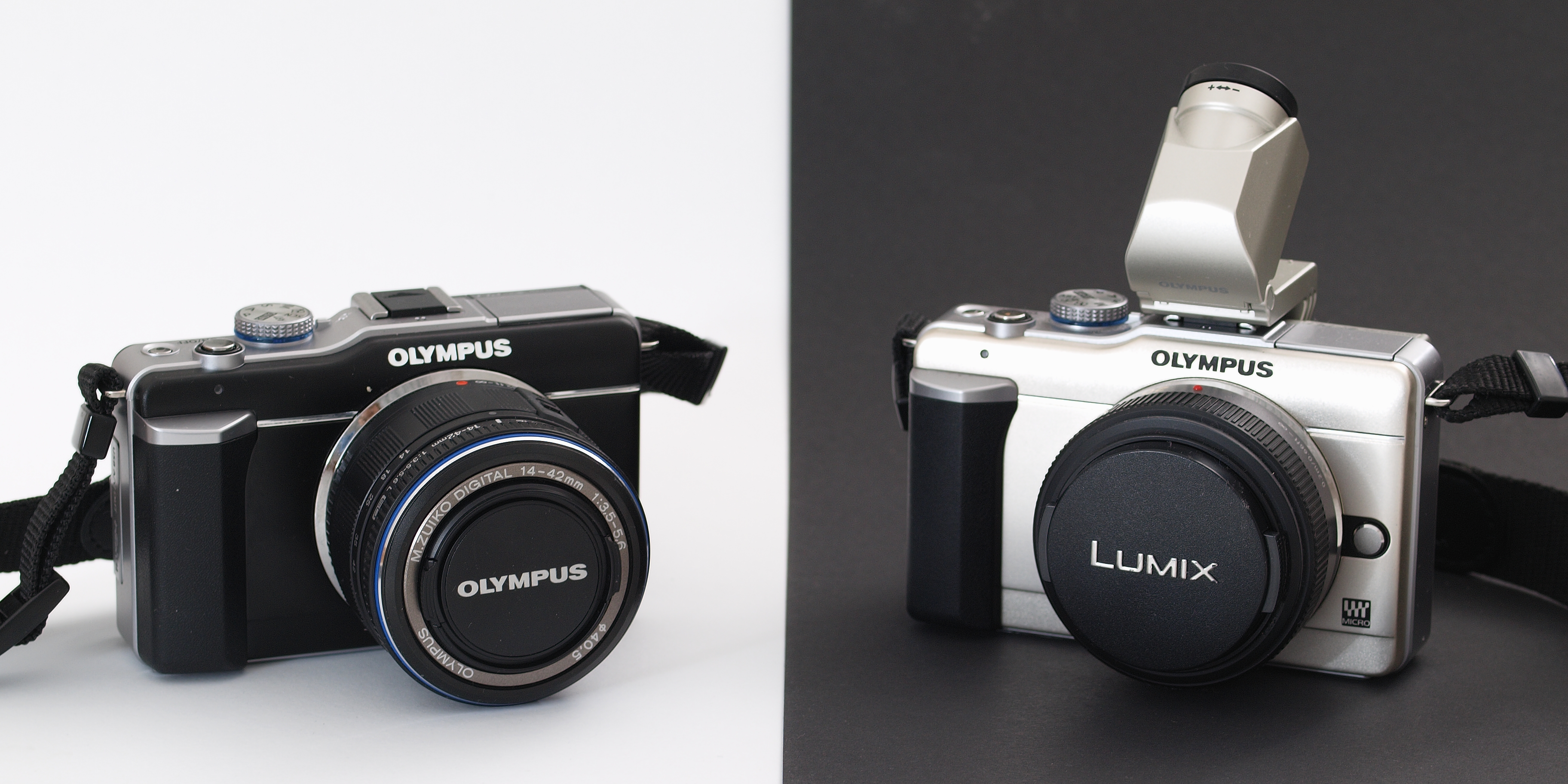
Black and champagne finishes, plus the Olympus VF-2 electronic viewfinder

Brand	Form	Class	2008	2009	2010	2011			2012	2013	2014	2015	2016	2017	2018	2019	2020	2021	2022	2023	2024	25
Olympus	SLR style OM-D	Professional															E-M1X ^{R}					
Olympus	SLR style OM-D	High-end									E-M1			E-M1 II ^{R}			E-M1 III ^{R}					
Olympus	SLR style OM-D	Advanced							E-M5			E-M5 II ^{R}					E-M5 III ^{R}					
Olympus	SLR style OM-D	Mid-range									E-M10		E-M10 II		E-M10 III			E-M10 IV				
Olympus	Rangefinder style PEN	Mid-range		E-P1	E-P2		E-P3				E-P5		PEN-F ^{R}									
Olympus	Rangefinder style PEN	Upper-entry			E-PL1	E-PL2		E-PL3	E-PL5		E-PL6	E-PL7		E-PL8	E-PL9		E-PL10					
Olympus	Rangefinder style PEN	Entry-level					E-PM1		E-PM2													
Olympus	remote													Air								
OM System	SLR style	Professional																	OM-1 ^{R}		OM-1 II ^{R}	
OM System	SLR style	High-end																				OM-3 ^{R}
OM System	SLR style	Advanced																		OM-5 ^{R}		
OM System	PEN	Mid-range																	E-P7			
Panasonic	SLR style	High-end Video													GH5S				GH6 ^{R}			GH7 ^{R}
Panasonic	SLR style	High-end Photo													G9 ^{R}						G9 II ^{R}	
Panasonic	SLR style	High-end		GH1		GH2			GH3		GH4				GH5				GH5II			
Panasonic	SLR style	Mid-range		G1	G2		G3		G5		G6		G7	G80/G85			G90/G95					
Panasonic	SLR style	Entry-level			G10													G100			G100D	
Panasonic	Rangefinder style	Advanced							GX1		GX7		GX8		GX9							
Panasonic	Rangefinder style	Mid-range									GM1	GM5	GX80/GX85									
Panasonic	Rangefinder style	Entry-level			GF1	GF2	GF3		GF5		GF6	GF7	GF8	GX800/GX850/GF9		GX880/GF10/GF90						
Panasonic	Camcorder	Professional							AG-AF104													
Kodak	Rangefinder style	Entry-level										S-1										
DJI	Drone	.												Zenmuse X5S								
DJI	Drone	.												Zenmuse X5								
YI	Rangefinder style	Entry-level												M1								
Yongnuo	Rangefinder style	Android camera															YN450M		YN455			
Blackmagic Design	Rangefinder style	High-End Video							Cinema Camera													
Blackmagic Design	Rangefinder style	High-End Video									Pocket Cinema Camera					Pocket Cinema Camera 4K						
Blackmagic Design		High-End Video										Micro Cinema Camera									Micro Studio Camera 4K G2	
Z CAM	Cinema	Advanced											E1			E2						
Z CAM	Cinema	Mid-Range																E2-M4				
Z CAM	Cinema	Entry-Level															E2C					
JVC	Camcorder	Professional										GY-LS300										
SVS-Vistek		Industrial							EVO Tracer													
