= Olympus PEN E-P3 =

Digital camera model

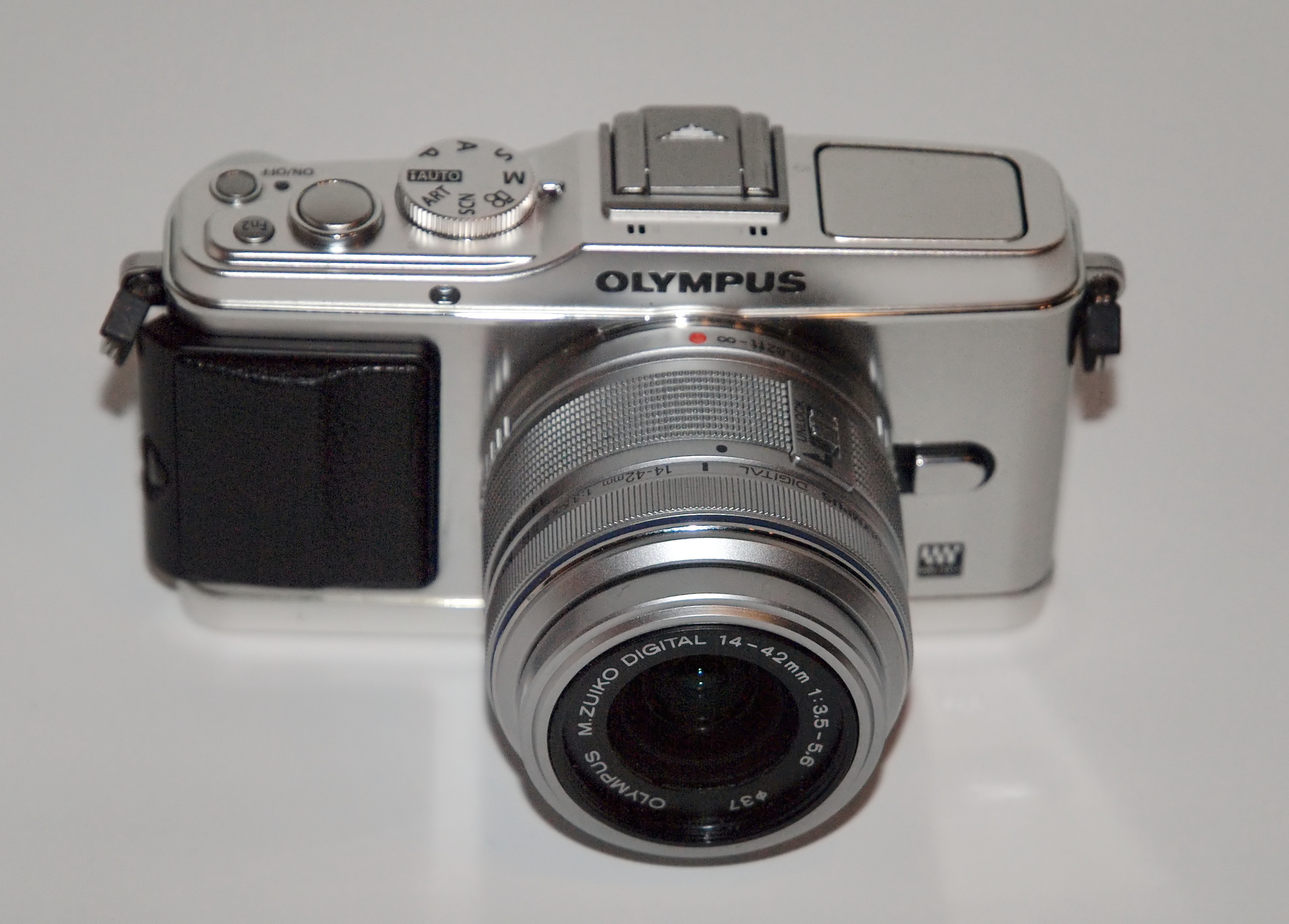

Overview
- Maker: Olympus Corporation
- Type: Micro Four Thirds, interchangeable lens camera

Lens
- Lens: Micro Four Thirds System mount

Sensor/medium
- Sensor: Four Thirds System 18.00 × 13.50 mm (17.30 × 13.00 mm imaging area) Live MOS
- Maximum resolution: 4032×3024 (12.3 megapixels)
- Film speed: ISO 200–12800
- Storage media: Secure Digital card; SDHC; SDXC

Focusing
- Focus modes: Single, continuous, manual
- Focus areas: 11 area contrast detect auto-focus, selectable

Exposure/metering
- Exposure modes: Program, shutter-priority, aperture-priority, manual
- Exposure metering: Digital ESP metering, Centre weighted average metering, Spot metering
- Metering modes: TTL ESP multi patterned (324-area multi pattern metering), Center-weighted average, Spot (1%)

Flash
- Flash: Built-in pop up, TTL, GN 10.5m equivalent (ISO100 · m); hotshoe for external flash attachment

Shutter
- Shutter: 1/4,000 to 60 s, 30 minutes bulb
- Continuous shooting: 3 frame/s

Viewfinder
- Viewfinder: live preview, optional electronic viewfinder VF-2; optional electronic viewfinder VF-3; optional optical viewfinder VF-1

General
- LCD screen: 3" 614K dots OLED LCD on screen with live preview with capacitive touchscreen control
- Battery: Olympus BLS-1 or BLS-5 Lithium-ion battery
- Dimensions: 122×69.1×34.3 mm (4.80×2.72×1.35 in) (4.8" * 2.72" * 1.35")
- Weight: 321 g (11.3 oz) (body only) 369 g (13.0 oz) (body, battery and SD memory card)

Footnotes
- Optional, exchangeable grips are available for right side of body

The Olympus PEN E-P3 announced on 30 June 2011 is Olympus Corporation's seventh camera that adheres to the Micro Four Thirds (MFT) system design standard. The E-P3 succeeds the Olympus PEN E-P2, and was announced in concert with two other models, the Olympus PEN E-PL3 (Lite version of E-P3), and the Olympus PEN E-PM1 (a new "Mini" version of the PEN camera line with similar features to the E-PL3).

The EP-3 addresses some of the concerns that critics had about previous PEN models, notably, slow handling, due to slow autofocus speed and difficulty seeing the LCD panel under certain (e.g., bright, sunny) conditions.

The E-P3 increases autofocus speed through use of a 120 Hz refresh rate for its sensor, similar to the technology used in the recently released Panasonic Lumix DMC-GH2 and G3 cameras. Olympus claims, based on in-house testing, that the E-P3 has the world's fastest autofocus speed of any camera as of the product announcement date. The benefits of the 120 Hz refresh rate also provides the ability for continuous autofocus tracking during bursts of exposures, a faster shutter response (less lag) and less blackout time between exposures.

The E-P3 now uses a capacitive touchscreen for creative camera control, and a new OLED type display that is supposed to vastly improve performance in sunny conditions, and off-angle viewing. The EP-3 continues with the proprietary Accessory Port, a power and communication port, which allows the use of various accessories, such as an external stereo microphone for HD video recording, LED macro lights, and a bluetooth communications adapter. The accessory port continues to be compatible with the high resolution, optional hotshoe mounted VF-2 electronic viewfinder (EVF). The VF-2 had a flip angle eyepiece, allowing viewing from 0–90 degrees. The VF-2 had been criticized for being very expensive and for not having a locking device, with some users reporting easy dislodgement of the VF-2 from the hotshoe. To address these criticisms, in July 2011, Olympus announced the introduction of an optional VF-3 EVF, which has a lower resolution, a locking device, and probably most importantly a US$100 lower MSRP.

In the United States the E-P3 MSRP with new 14–42 mm kit zoom lens or 17 mm f/2.8 pancake lens was US$899. The accessory VF-3 EVF was also available separately for US$180.00. Available body colors were black and silver.

== Micro Four Thirds System ==
The Micro Four Thirds (MFT) system design standard was jointly announced in 2008 by Olympus and Panasonic, as a further evolution of the similarly named predecessor Four Thirds System pioneered by Olympus. The Micro Four-Thirds system standard uses the same sized sensor (nominal 4000 pixels by 3000 pixels) as the original Four Thirds system. One potential advantage of the smaller MFT system sensor (when compared to market leaders Canon and Nikon APS-C and full frame sized) are smaller and lighter lenses. The smaller MFT sensor allows for a reduced image circle, which allows the development of smaller and lighter native lenses. The MFT sensor has a crop factor of 2.0 when compared to 35mm film equivalent full frame sensors. By comparison, the more popular consumer (as opposed to professional) DSLRs such as those made by Canon, Nikon and Sony have 1.5 to 1.6 crop factor APS-C sensors, which means larger and heavier lens designs. For example, a typical Olympus MFT M.Zuiko 14-42mm f/3.5–5.6 kit lens weighs 112 grams (4.0 oz), is 56 millimetres (2.2 in) in diameter and 50 millimetres (2.0 in) in length. The equivalent Canon APS-C DSLR EF-S 18–55mm f3.5–5.6 kit lens weighs 190g, and is 69mm in diameter and 80mm in length

While the older Four Thirds system design standard allowed the incorporation of a single lens reflex (SLR) camera design including a mirror box and pentaprism based optical viewfinder system, the MFT system design standard sought to pursue a technically different camera, and specifically slimmed down the key physical specifications which eliminated the ability to include the traditional complex optical path and the bulky mirror box needed for a SLR optical viewfinder. Instead, MFT uses either a built-in (Panasonic) or optional (Olympus/Panasonic) compact electronic viewfinder (EVF) and/or LCD back panel displaying a Live view from the main image sensor. Use of an EVF/back panel LCD and smaller four thirds image sensor format and allows for smaller and lighter camera bodies and lenses. The MFT system standard also specifically includes seamless switching between still photography and HD video recording as a design criterion.

MFT cameras are physically slimmer than most interchangeable lens cameras because the standard specifies a much reduced lens mount flange to imaging sensor plane distance of just 20 millimetres (0.79 in). Typically this so-called flange focal distance is over 40 millimetres (1.6 in) on most interchangeable lens cameras. The MFT system design flange focal length distance allows for, through use of an adapter, the possibility to mount virtually any manufacturer's existing and legacy still camera interchangeable lens (as well as some video and cine lenses) to an MFT body, albeit using manual focus and manual aperture control. For example, many theoretically obsolete 35mm film camera lenses, as well as existing current lenses for APS-C and full frame DSLR's are now usable on MFT cameras. As an example, an older (i.e., used, obsolete and low priced), but still high quality, 50mm f/1.8 "standard" lens from a 35mm film camera can be used on a MFT camera body. With MFT sensors having a crop factor of 2.0, the old 50mm f/1.8 "standard" lens becomes a high-speed (although manual) 100mm f/1.8 telephoto portrait lens. So the MFT system allows the re-use of expensive lenses that may have outlived their 35mm film format camera, and can be used on a modern digital camera body capable of both still and HD video recording. Similarly, the MFT system design allows current DSLR lenses to be used as well, although only with manual focus and aperture control.

== Differences over Olympus PEN E-P1 ==
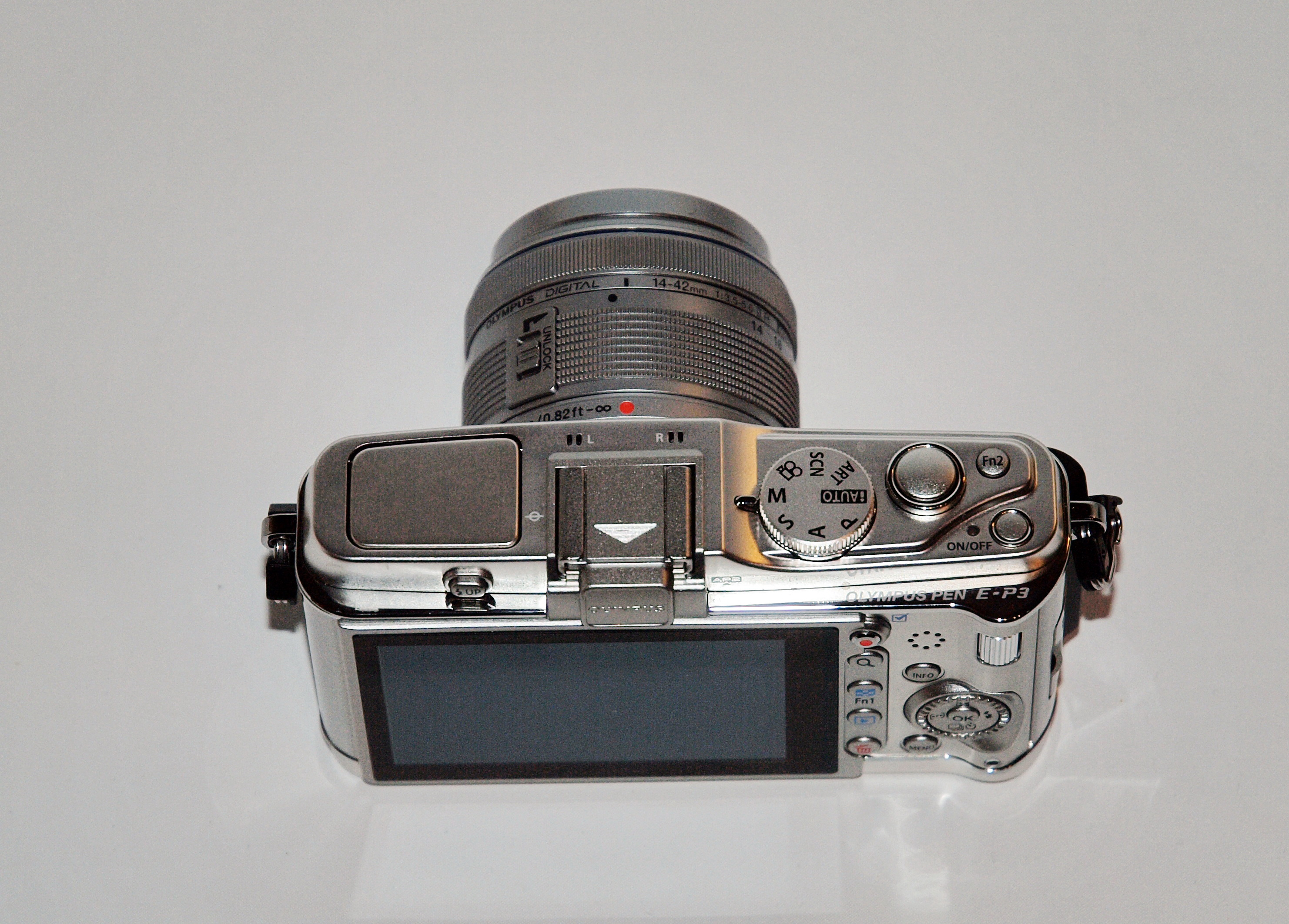

- Addition of an Accessory Port that can be used for an electronic viewfinder or external microphone
- The E-P1 has six art filters, while the E-P3 now has ten art filters: Pop Art, Soft Focus, Pale & Light Color, Light Tone, Grainy Film, Pin Hole, Diorama, Cross Process, Gentle Sepia and Dramatic Tone
- Black finish widely available, silver finish available in Japan
- Auto focus tracking
- AF Illuminator and 32 Auto Focus points
- 3-inch OLED Touch Screen
- Colour boosting function named i-Enhance

== Specifications not in the infobox ==
- 1080i Full HD video at 60i frames per second (frame/s) and 720p Full HD video at 60p frames per second (frame/s)

== See also ==
- Olympus PEN E-PL1
- Mirrorless interchangeable-lens camera

== Micro Four Thirds Camera introduction roadmap ==
| Item | Model | Sensor | Electronic View Finder (EVF) | Announced |
|---|---|---|---|---|
| 1 | Panasonic Lumix DMC-G1 | 4:3 / 13.1 mp (12.1 mp effective) | EVF; 1.4x magnification; 1.44M dots | 2008, October |
| 2 | Panasonic Lumix DMC-GH1 | 4:3; 3:2; 16:9 (multi-aspect); 14.0 mp (12.1 mp effect) | EVF; 1.4x mag; 1.44M dots | 2009, April |
| 3 | Olympus PEN E-P1 | 4:3 / 13.1 mp (12.3 mp effect) | optional hotshoe optical VF-1; 65-degree AOV | 2009, July |
| 4 | Panasonic Lumix DMC-GF1 | 4:3 / 13.1 mp (12.1 mp effect) | optional hotshoe EVF LVF1; 1.04x mag; 202K dots | 2009, September |
| 5 | Olympus PEN E-P2 | 4:3 / 13.1 mp (12.3 mp effect) | optional hotshoe EVF VF-2; 1.15x mag; 1.44M dots | 2009, November |
| 6 | Olympus PEN E-PL1 | 4:3 / 13.1 mp (12.3 mp effect) | optional hotshoe EVF VF-2; 1.15x mag; 1.44M dots | 2010, February |
| 7 | Panasonic Lumix DMC-G10 | 4:3 / 13.1 mp (12.1 mp effect) | EVF; 1.04x magnification; 202K dots | 2010, March |
| 8 | Panasonic Lumix DMC-G2 | 4:3 / 13.1 mp (12.1 mp effect) | EVF; 1.4x mag; 1.44M dots | 2010, March |
| 9 | Panasonic Lumix DMC-GH2 | 4:3; 3:2; 16:9 (multi-aspect); 18.3 mp (16.0 mp effect) | EVF; 1.42x mag; 1.53M dots | 2010, September |
| 10 | Panasonic Lumix DMC-GF2 | 4:3 / 13.1 mp (12.1 mp effect) | optional hotshoe EVF; 1.04x mag; 202K dots | 2010, November |
| 11 | Olympus PEN E-PL1s | 4:3 / 13.1 mp (12.3 mp effect) | optional hotshoe EVF VF-2; 1.15x mag; 1.44M dots | 2010, November |
| 12 | Olympus PEN E-PL2 | 4:3 / 13.1 mp (12.3 mp effect) | optional hotshoe EVF VF-2; 1.15x mag; 1.44M dots | 2011, January |
| 13 | Panasonic Lumix DMC-G3 | 4:3 / 16.6 mp (15.8 mp effect) | EVF; 1.4x mag; 1.44M dots | 2011, May |
| 14 | Panasonic Lumix DMC-GF3 | 4:3 / 13.1 mp (12.1 mp effect) | N/A | 2011, June |
| 15 | Olympus PEN E-P3 | 4:3 / 13.1 mp (12.3 mp effect) | optional hotshoe EVF VF-2; 1.15x mag; 1.44M dots | 2011, June |
| 16 | Olympus PEN E-PL3 | 4:3 / 13.1 mp (12.3 mp effect) | optional hotshoe EVF VF-2; 1.15x mag; 1.44M dots | 2011, June |
| 17 | Olympus PEN E-PM1 | 4:3 / 13.1 mp (12.3 mp effect) | optional hotshoe EVF VF-2; 1.15x mag; 1.44M dots | 2011, June |
| 18 | Panasonic Lumix DMC-GX1 | 4:3 / 16.6 mp (16.0 mp effect) | optional hotshoe EVF LVF2; 1.4x mag; 1.44M dots | 2011, November |
| 19 | Olympus OM-D E-M5 | 4:3 / 16.9 mp (16.1 mp effect) | EVF; 1.15x mag; 1.44M dots | 2012, February |

| Preceded by Olympus PEN EP-2 | Olympus PEN E-P3 Micro Four Thirds camera August 2011–present | Succeeded by Not Announced |

| Brand | Form | Class | 2008 | 2009 | 2010 | 2011 | | | 2012 | 2013 | 2014 | 2015 | 2016 | 2017 | 2018 | 2019 | 2020 | 2021 | 2022 | 2023 | 2024 | 2025 | 2026 |
| Olympus | SLR style OM-D | Professional | | | | | | | | | | | | | | | E-M1X ^{R} | | | | | | |
| Olympus | SLR style OM-D | High-end | | | | | | | | | E-M1 | | | E-M1 II ^{R} | | | E-M1 III ^{R} | | | | | | |
| Olympus | SLR style OM-D | Advanced | | | | | | | E-M5 | | | E-M5 II ^{R} | | | | | E-M5 III ^{R} | | | | | | |
| Olympus | SLR style OM-D | Mid-range | | | | | | | | | E-M10 | | E-M10 II | | E-M10 III | | | E-M10 IV | | | | | |
| Olympus | Rangefinder style PEN | Mid-range | | E-P1 | E-P2 | | E-P3 | | | | E-P5 | | PEN-F ^{R} | | | | | | | | | | |
| Olympus | Rangefinder style PEN | Upper-entry | | | E-PL1 | E-PL2 | | E-PL3 | E-PL5 | | E-PL6 | E-PL7 | | E-PL8 | E-PL9 | | E-PL10 | | | | | | |
| Olympus | Rangefinder style PEN | Entry-level | | | | | E-PM1 | | E-PM2 | | | | | | | | | | | | | | |
| Olympus | remote | | | | | | | | | | | | | Air | | | | | | | | | |
| OM System | SLR style | Professional | | | | | | | | | | | | | | | | | OM-1 ^{R} | | OM-1 II ^{R} | | |
| OM System | SLR style | High-end | | | | | | | | | | | | | | | | | | | | OM-3 ^{R} | |
| OM System | SLR style | Advanced | | | | | | | | | | | | | | | | | | OM-5 ^{R} | | | OM-5 II ^{R} |
| OM System | PEN | Mid-range | | | | | | | | | | | | | | | | | E-P7 | | | | |
| Panasonic | SLR style | High-end Video | | | | | | | | | | | | | GH5S | | | | GH6 ^{R} | | | GH7 ^{R} | |
| Panasonic | SLR style | High-end Photo | | | | | | | | | | | | | G9 ^{R} | | | | | | G9 II ^{R} | | |
| Panasonic | SLR style | High-end | | GH1 | | GH2 | | | GH3 | | GH4 | | | | GH5 | | | | GH5II | | | | |
| Panasonic | SLR style | Mid-range | | G1 | G2 | | G3 | | G5 | | G6 | | G7 | G80/G85 | | | G90/G95 | | | | | | |
| Panasonic | SLR style | Entry-level | | | G10 | | | | | | | | | | | | | G100 | | | G100D | | |
| Panasonic | Rangefinder style | Advanced | | | | | | | GX1 | | GX7 | | GX8 | | GX9 | | | | | | | | |
| Panasonic | Rangefinder style | Mid-range | | | | | | | | | GM1 | GM5 | GX80/GX85 | | | | | | | | | | |
| Panasonic | Rangefinder style | Entry-level | | | GF1 | GF2 | GF3 | | GF5 | | GF6 | GF7 | GF8 | GX800/GX850/GF9 | | GX880/GF10/GF90 | | | | | | | |
| Panasonic | Camcorder | Professional | | | | | | | AG-AF104 | | | | | | | | | | | | | | |
| Kodak | Rangefinder style | Entry-level | | | | | | | | | | S-1 | | | | | | | | | | | |
| DJI | Drone | . | | | | | | | | | | | | Zenmuse X5S | | | | | | | | | |
| DJI | Drone | . | | | | | | | | | | | | Zenmuse X5 | | | | | | | | | |
| YI | Rangefinder style | Entry-level | | | | | | | | | | | | M1 | | | | | | | | | |
| Yongnuo | Rangefinder style | Android camera | | | | | | | | | | | | | | | YN450M | | YN455 | | | | |
| Blackmagic Design | Rangefinder style | High-End Video | | | | | | | Cinema Camera | | | | | | | | | | | | | | |
| Blackmagic Design | Rangefinder style | High-End Video | | | | | | | | | Pocket Cinema Camera | | | | | Pocket Cinema Camera 4K | | | | | | | |
| Blackmagic Design | | High-End Video | | | | | | | | | | Micro Cinema Camera | | | | | | | | | Micro Studio Camera 4K G2 | | |
| Z CAM | Cinema | Advanced | | | | | | | | | | | E1 | | | E2 | | | | | | | |
| Z CAM | Cinema | Mid-Range | | | | | | | | | | | | | | | | E2-M4 | | | | | |
| Z CAM | Cinema | Entry-Level | | | | | | | | | | | | | | | E2C | | | | | | |
| JVC | Camcorder | Professional | | | | | | | | | | GY-LS300 | | | | | | | | | | | |
| SVS-Vistek | | Industrial | | | | | | | EVO Tracer | | | | | | | | | | | | | | |
