= Olympus M.Zuiko Digital 45mm f/1.8 =

M.Zuiko Digital 45mm f1.8 MSC
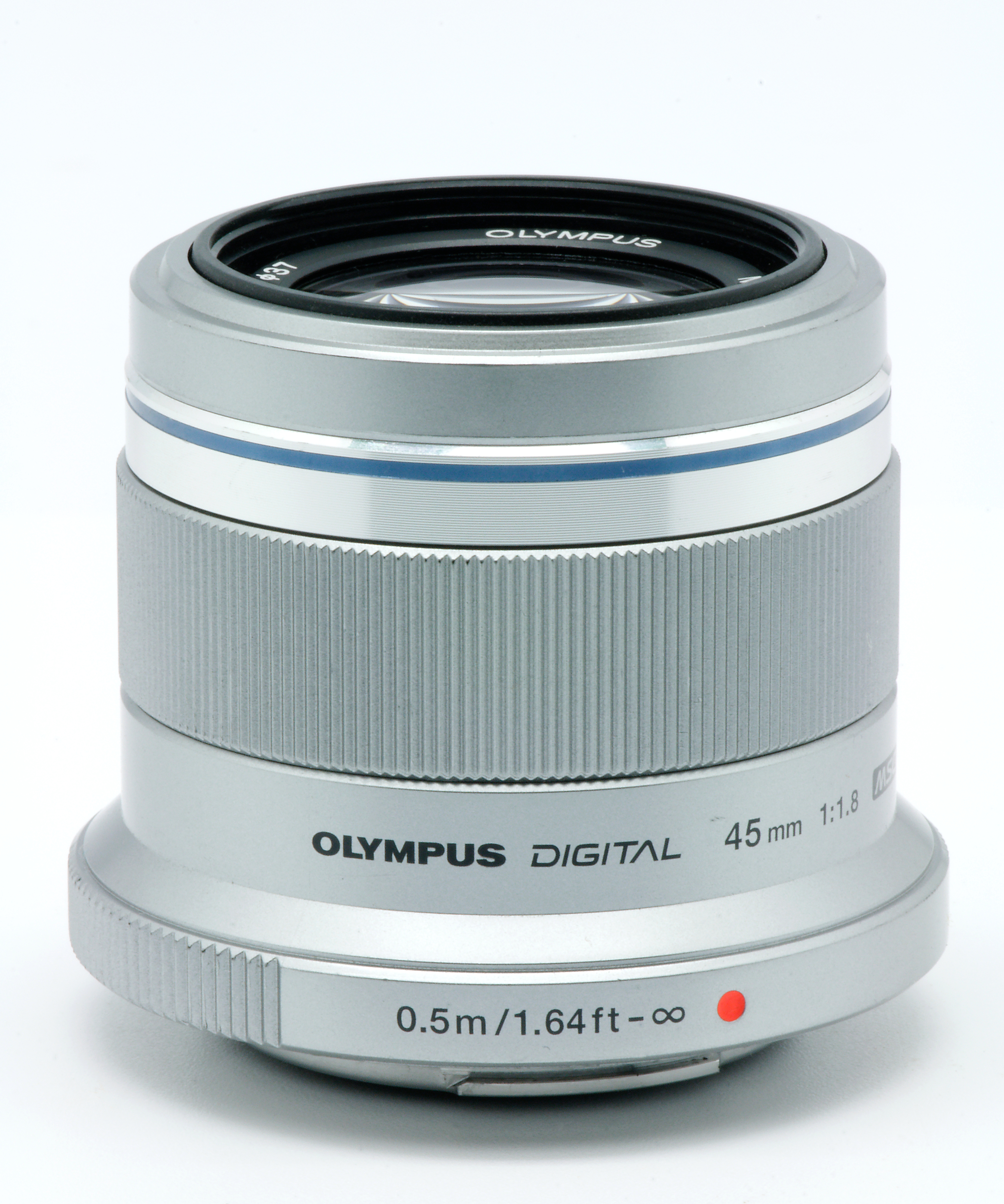
- Maker: Olympus Corporation

Technical data
- Type: Prime
- Focal length: 45mm
- Focal length (35mm equiv.): 90mm
- Aperture (max/min): f/1.8 - 22
- Close focus distance: 0.5m (19.69 in)
- Max. magnification: 0.11
- Diaphragm blades: 7, circular
- Construction: 9 elements in 8 groups

Features
- Lens-based stabilization: No No
- Macro capable: No No

Physical
- Max. length: 46 mm (1.81 in)
- Diameter: 56 mm (2.20 in)
- Weight: 116g (4.09 oz)
- Filter diameter: Ø37 mm

Angle of view
- Diagonal: 27°

History
- Introduction: 2011

The M.Zuiko Digital 45 mm f/1.8 is a prime lens by Olympus Corporation, for the Micro Four Thirds System. It is sold in a kit with the Olympus PEN camera body and available separately.
