= Olympus PEN E-PM1 =

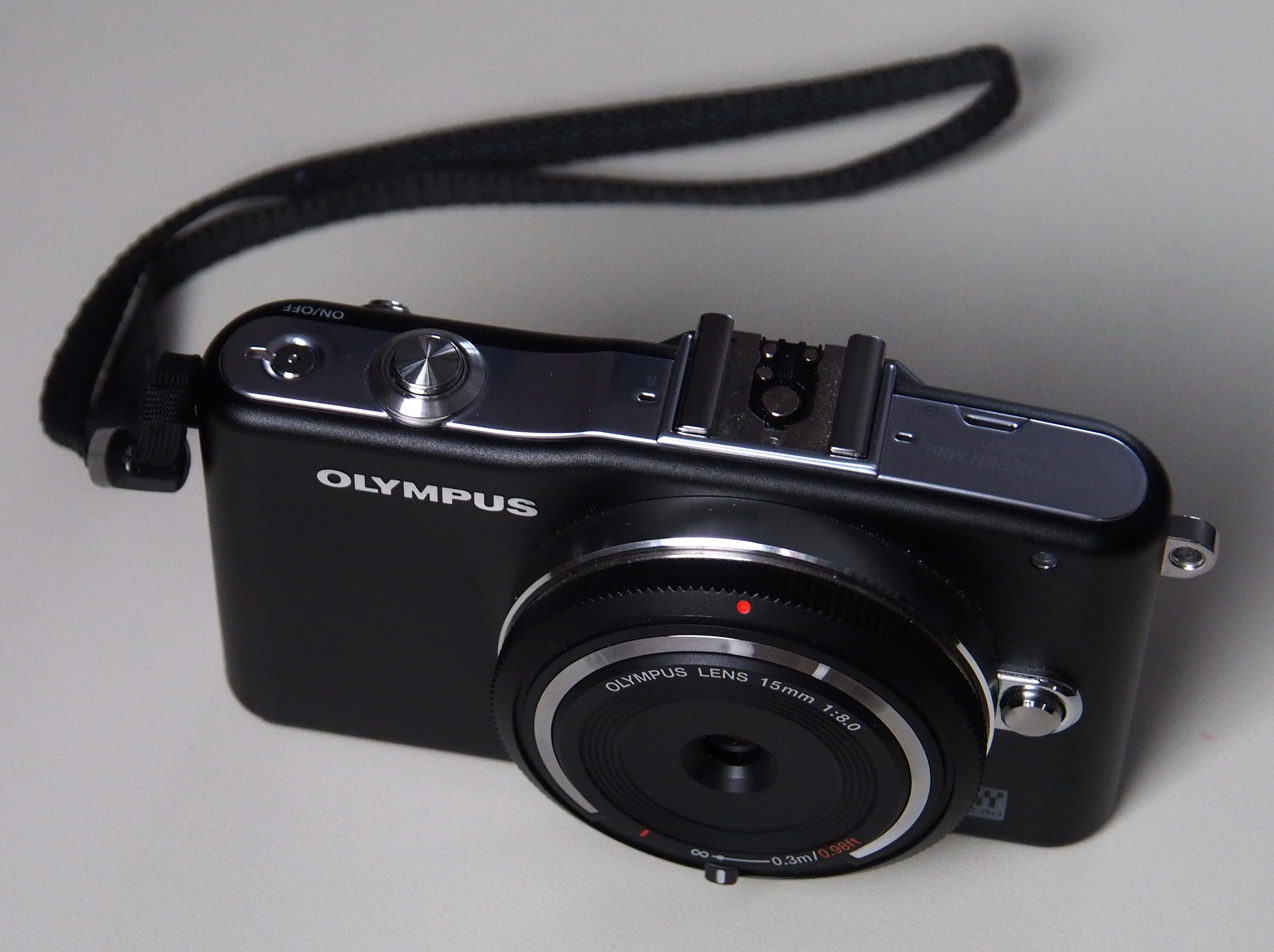

Overview
- Maker: Olympus

Lens
- Lens mount: Micro Four Thirds

Sensor/medium
- Sensor type: CMOS
- Sensor size: 17.3 x 13mm (Four Thirds type)
- Maximum resolution: 4032 x 3024 (12 megapixels)
- Recording medium: SD, SDHC or SDXC memory card

Focusing
- Focus areas: 35 focus points

Shutter
- Shutter speeds: 1/4000s to 60s
- Continuous shooting: 5.5 frames per second

Image processing
- Image processor: TruePic VI
- White balance: Yes

General
- LCD screen: 3 inches with 460,000 dots
- Dimensions: 110 x 64 x 34mm (4.33 x 2.52 x 1.34 inches)
- Weight: 265 g (9 oz) including battery

The Olympus PEN E-PM1 is an entry-level mirrorless interchangeable-lens camera from Japanese manufacturer Olympus with a Micro Four Thirds lens mount and sensor. It includes a 12.3 megapixel sensor, 3-inch 460,000 pixel LCD screen, and sensor-based image stabilization, but no viewfinder or internal flash, although either an external viewfinder or an external flash can be fitted.

== History ==
The E-PM1 was announced on June 30, 2011 alongside two other Olympus Micro Four Thirds cameras, the E-P3 and E-PL3.

== Reviews ==
Reviewers generally praised the image quality and wide range of customization it offers, although there were some criticisms of its performance. The small size also divided reviewers, with some praising its compactness and others criticising it as difficult to handle and noting that the lack of external controls making it hard to quickly change settings.

DP Review rated it 71% and a silver award, praising its image quality, small size, and wide range of customisable features.

What Digital Camera called it "an easy to use camera" while criticising the auto white balance accuracy, weak performance in low light, and lack of physical grip on the camera body.

Expert Reviews gave it 4/5, praising its flexibility and good value while calling it "far from perfect".

PC Advisor noted a compromise between the small size and lack of physical controls, making it harder to quickly change between modes and settings, but found it was a good upgrade from a compact digital camera.

Brand	Form	Class	2008	2009	2010	2011			2012	2013	2014	2015	2016	2017	2018	2019	2020	2021	2022	2023	2024	2025	2026
Olympus	SLR style OM-D	Professional															E-M1X ^{R}						
Olympus	SLR style OM-D	High-end									E-M1			E-M1 II ^{R}			E-M1 III ^{R}						
Olympus	SLR style OM-D	Advanced							E-M5			E-M5 II ^{R}					E-M5 III ^{R}						
Olympus	SLR style OM-D	Mid-range									E-M10		E-M10 II		E-M10 III			E-M10 IV					
Olympus	Rangefinder style PEN	Mid-range		E-P1	E-P2		E-P3				E-P5		PEN-F ^{R}										
Olympus	Rangefinder style PEN	Upper-entry			E-PL1	E-PL2		E-PL3	E-PL5		E-PL6	E-PL7		E-PL8	E-PL9		E-PL10						
Olympus	Rangefinder style PEN	Entry-level					E-PM1		E-PM2														
Olympus	remote													Air									
OM System	SLR style	Professional																	OM-1 ^{R}		OM-1 II ^{R}		
OM System	SLR style	High-end																				OM-3 ^{R}	
OM System	SLR style	Advanced																		OM-5 ^{R}			OM-5 II ^{R}
OM System	PEN	Mid-range																	E-P7				
Panasonic	SLR style	High-end Video													GH5S				GH6 ^{R}			GH7 ^{R}	
Panasonic	SLR style	High-end Photo													G9 ^{R}						G9 II ^{R}		
Panasonic	SLR style	High-end		GH1		GH2			GH3		GH4				GH5				GH5II				
Panasonic	SLR style	Mid-range		G1	G2		G3		G5		G6		G7	G80/G85			G90/G95						
Panasonic	SLR style	Entry-level			G10													G100			G100D		
Panasonic	Rangefinder style	Advanced							GX1		GX7		GX8		GX9								
Panasonic	Rangefinder style	Mid-range									GM1	GM5	GX80/GX85										
Panasonic	Rangefinder style	Entry-level			GF1	GF2	GF3		GF5		GF6	GF7	GF8	GX800/GX850/GF9		GX880/GF10/GF90							
Panasonic	Camcorder	Professional							AG-AF104														
Kodak	Rangefinder style	Entry-level										S-1											
DJI	Drone	.												Zenmuse X5S									
DJI	Drone	.												Zenmuse X5									
YI	Rangefinder style	Entry-level												M1									
Yongnuo	Rangefinder style	Android camera															YN450M		YN455				
Blackmagic Design	Rangefinder style	High-End Video							Cinema Camera														
Blackmagic Design	Rangefinder style	High-End Video									Pocket Cinema Camera					Pocket Cinema Camera 4K							
Blackmagic Design		High-End Video										Micro Cinema Camera									Micro Studio Camera 4K G2		
Z CAM	Cinema	Advanced											E1			E2							
Z CAM	Cinema	Mid-Range																E2-M4					
Z CAM	Cinema	Entry-Level															E2C						
JVC	Camcorder	Professional										GY-LS300											
SVS-Vistek		Industrial							EVO Tracer														
