= DRYOS =

Real-time operating system by Canon

- Developer: Canon
- OS family: Real-time operating systems
- Marketing target: Digital cameras and camcorders
- License: proprietary software
- Official website: www.canon.com/technology/canon_tech/explanation/dryos.html

DRYOS (also stylized as DryOS) is a proprietary real-time operating system made by Canon and is used in their digital cameras and camcorders.

Since late 2007, DIGIC-based cameras are shipped using DRYOS. It replaces VxWorks from Wind River Systems which has been used before on DIGIC II and some DIGIC III equipped cameras. DRYOS had existed before and was in use in other Canon hardware, such as digital video cameras and high-end webcams.

DRYOS has a 16-kilobyte kernel module at its core and is currently compatible with more than 10 CPU types. It provides a simulation-based development environment for debugging. Canon also developed a USB- and middleware-compatible device driver for file systems and network devices, e.g. video server.

DRYOS aims to be compatible with μITRON 4.0 and with POSIX.

== Cameras with DRYOS ==
The following cameras are known to run DRYOS:

- Canon PowerShot SX1 IS
- Canon PowerShot SX10 IS
- Canon PowerShot SX20 IS
- Canon PowerShot SX30 IS
- Canon PowerShot SX40 HS
- Canon PowerShot SX50 HS
- Canon PowerShot SX60 HS
- Canon PowerShot S5 IS
- Canon PowerShot S90
- Canon PowerShot S95
- Canon PowerShot G9
- Canon PowerShot G10
- Canon PowerShot G11
- Canon PowerShot G12
- Canon PowerShot A470
- Canon PowerShot A480
- Canon PowerShot A580
- Canon PowerShot A590 IS
- Canon PowerShot A650 IS
- Canon PowerShot A720 IS
- Canon PowerShot A810
- Canon PowerShot A1100 IS
- Canon PowerShot A2200 IS
- Canon PowerShot A2300 IS
- Canon PowerShot A3000 IS
- Canon PowerShot A3100 IS
- Canon PowerShot SD1100 IS
- Canon PowerShot SX100 IS
- Canon PowerShot SX110 IS
- Canon PowerShot SX120 IS
- Canon PowerShot SX130 IS
- Canon PowerShot SX160 IS
- Canon PowerShot SX200 IS
- Canon PowerShot SX230 IS
- Canon PowerShot SX230 HS
- Canon PowerShot SD780 IS
- Canon PowerShot SD880 IS
- Canon PowerShot SD990 IS (IXUS 980 IS)
- Canon PowerShot SD1400 IS
- Canon PowerShot ELPH100 HS (IXUS 115 HS)
- Canon EOS 5D Mark IV
- Canon EOS 80D
- Canon EOS 90D
- Canon EOS 650D
- Canon EOS 700D
- Canon EOS 750D
- Canon EOS 1100D
- Canon EOS 1200D
- Canon EOS 1300D
- Canon EOS 5D Mark III
- Canon EOS 7D Mark II
- Canon EOS M
- Canon EOS M2
- Canon EOS M3
- Canon EOS M10
- Canon EOS M50
- Canon EOS M100
- Canon EOS R-series
