= Canon PowerShot S80 =

Overview
- Maker: Canon Inc.
- Type: Digital Camera

Lens
- Lens: 28 mm–100 mm f/2.8–f/5.3

Sensor/medium
- Sensor: 1/1.8" CCD
- Maximum resolution: 3264 × 2448 (8.0 megapixels)
- Film speed: ISO 50, 100, 200, 400
- Storage media: Secure Digital card

Focusing
- Focus modes: Auto and Manual

Exposure/metering
- Exposure metering: Evaluative, Center-Weighted Average, Spot

Flash
- Flash: Internal

Shutter
- Shutter speed range: 1/1500 sec–15 sec
- Continuous shooting: Approx. 1.8 frame/s

Viewfinder
- Viewfinder: Optical, LCD

Image processing
- White balance: 6 positions & manual preset

General
- LCD screen: 2.5"
- Battery: Canon NB-2LH/NB-2L Li-Ion
- Weight: 225 g (7.9 oz)

Chronology
- Replaced: S70
- Successor: S90

The Canon PowerShot S80 is an 8.0 megapixel digital camera originally released in 2005. The PowerShot S80 is the successor of Canon PowerShot S70. At introduction, its MSRP was US$599.

== Features ==
- 8.0 megapixels
- JPEG (Exif 2.2) support
- Film speed equivalent of ISO 50–400
- Wide-angle zoom lens 28 mm–105 mm
- Completely manual settings
- DIGIC II

== Sample photos ==
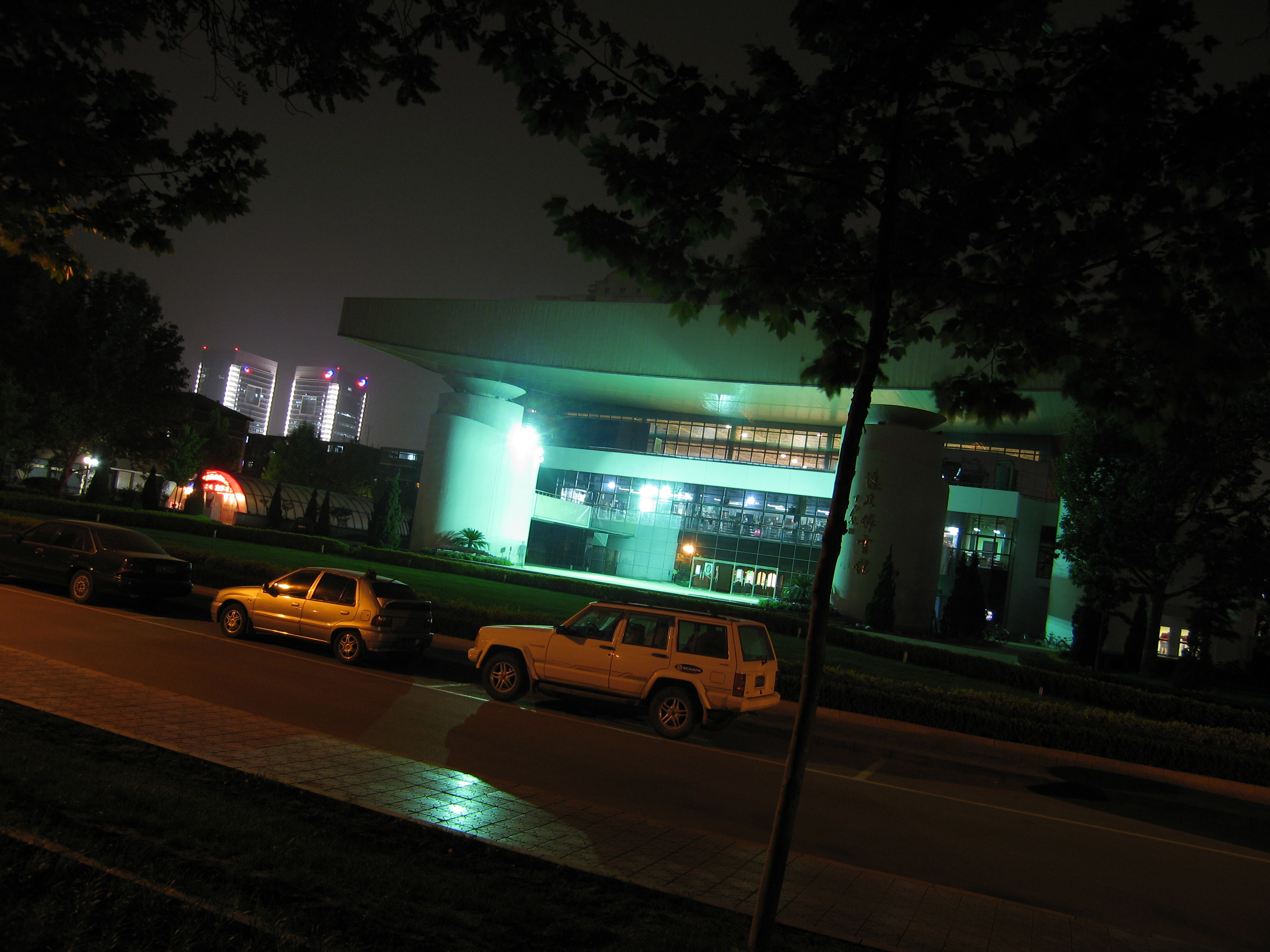
Night photography

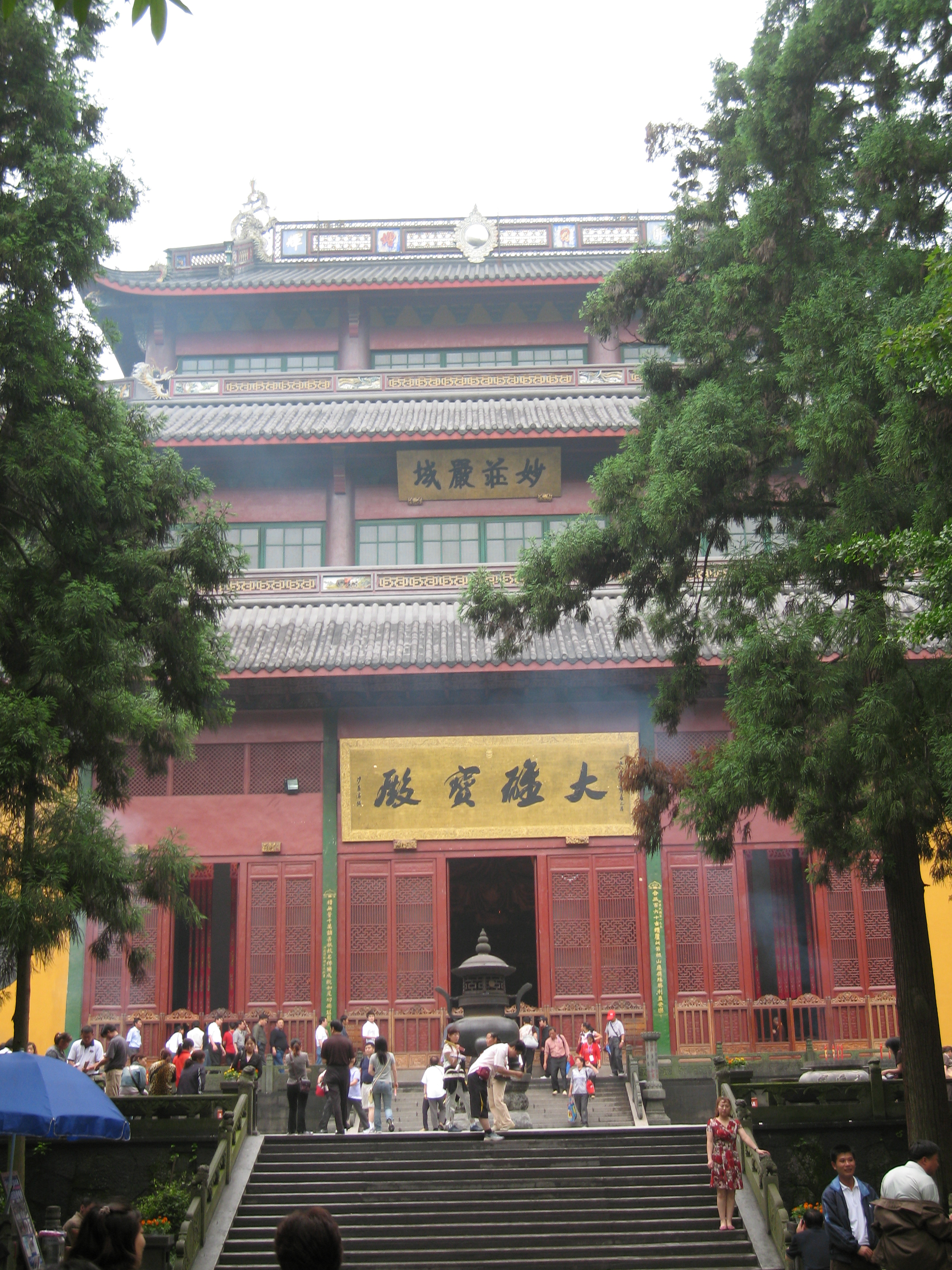
Wide angle picture

Preceded by S70	Canon Powershot Compact S series October 2005 – September 2009	Succeeded by S90
