= S110 =

S110 may refer to:

- County Route S110 (Bergen County, New Jersey)
- S110 (Nissan Silvia), a 1979 car model
- S110 (Amsterdam), a city route in Amsterdam, the Netherlands
- Honda S110, a Honda motorcycle model
- a Canon Digital IXUS camera model
- a Canon PowerShot S110 camera model
- Irish Section 110 Special Purpose Vehicle (SPV), an Irish company structure
