= Canon PowerShot S100 =

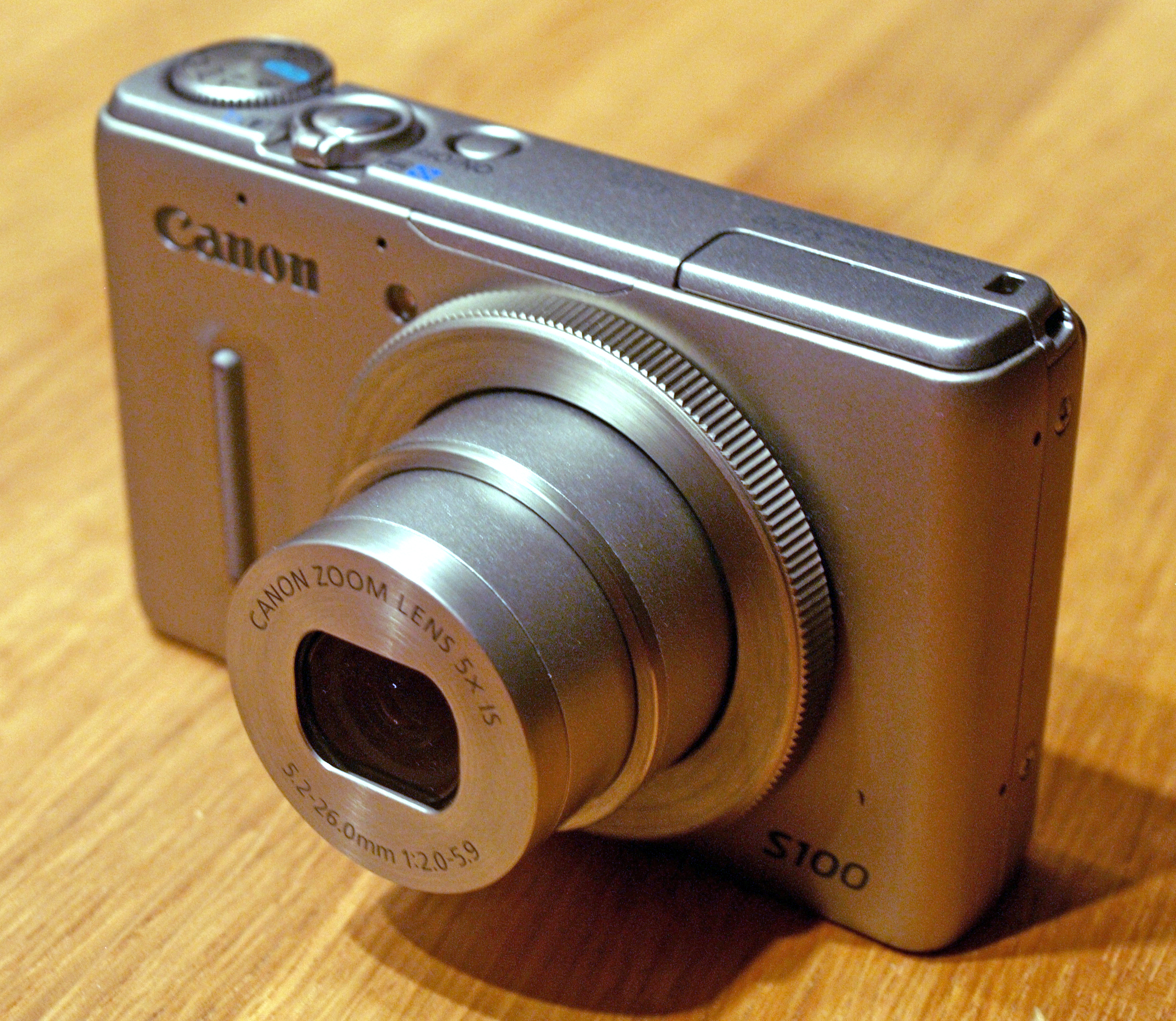

Overview
- Maker: Canon Inc.
- Type: Digital Camera
- Intro price: $429.99

Lens
- Lens: 5.2–26.0 mm f/2.0–f/5.9 (35 mm equivalent: 24–120 mm f/9.3–f/27.3)

Sensor/medium
- Sensor: 1/1,7" CMOS
- Maximum resolution: 4000 × 3000 (12.1 megapixels)
- Film speed: Auto, ISO 80–6400 (in 1/3-step increments)
- Storage media: Secure Digital card (incl. SDHC and SDXC)

Focusing
- Focus modes: Single, Continuous (only available in Auto mode), Servo AF/AEl, Manual Focus

Exposure/metering
- Metering modes: Evaluative, Center-weighted average, Spot

Flash
- Flash: 50 cm – 7 m (wide), 90 cm – 2.3 m (tele)

Shutter
- Shutter: Mechanical and electronic shutter
- Shutter speed range: 1/2000 – 1 sec. (Auto mode), 1/2000 to 15 sec.
- Continuous shooting: Approx. 2.3 frame/s 9.6 frame/s in High-speed Burst HQ mode

Image processing
- White balance: Auto, Daylight, Cloudy, Tungsten, Fluorescent, Fluorescent H, Flash, Underwater, Custom

General
- LCD screen: 3.0-inch TFT Color LCD, approx. 461,000 dots
- Battery: Canon NB-5L Li-Ion
- Optional battery packs: AC Adapter Kit ACK-DC30
- Dimensions: 98.9 mm × 59.8 mm × 26.7 mm (3.89 in × 2.35 in × 1.05 in)
- Weight: 173 g (6.1 oz) excluding battery
- Made in: Japan

The Canon PowerShot S100 is a high-end 12.1-megapixel compact digital camera announced and released in 2011. It was designed as the successor to the Canon PowerShot S95 in the S series of the Canon PowerShot line of cameras.

The S100 is a similar camera to S90 and S95 with several significant improvements. It has improved noise reduction, white balance and shadow correction. This camera is the first camera in the S series line to use the CMOS Sensor which gives the camera a higher performance and better light sensitivity. The S100 is also the first camera in the series to feature 1080p video recording in 24 frames per second.

Canon has acknowledged that some PowerShot S100 digital cameras encounter a lens error caused by a disconnected part inside the camera. This makes the camera unusable. Canon offered free repairs well beyond the warranty date, even if the camera has a serial number outside the range mentioned in the product advisory; however, this ended when they stopped servicing the S100.

As of 2023, PowerShot S100 remains the only fixed lens camera in Canon lineup to feature shooting in RAW and embedding GPS data, using a built-in GPS receiver.

== Features ==
- 12.1 megapixels
- JPEG (Exif 2.3) support
- Raw image file format; one of few "point and shoot" cameras to have raw formatting. (Note: Raw format is not available in Auto, Low Light, and SCN modes. Raw is available in Program, Tv (shutter priority), Av (aperture priority), Manual, and Custom modes)
- ISO sensitivity 80–6400 (in 1/3-step increments) and auto (up to ISO 1600).
- Full manual control
- Customizable Control Ring to control ISO, shutter speed, aperture, focus, or exposure compensation
- Five photo aspect ratios: 16:9, 3:2, 4:3, 1:1, 4:5
- Video features
  - Recording Standard, Color Accent, Color Swap: 1920 × 1080 (24 frame/s), 1280 × 720 (30 frame/s), 640 × 480 (30)
  - Recording Miniature Effect: 1280 × 720 (6 / 3 / 1.5 frame/s), 640 × 480 (6 / 3 / 1.5 frame/s)
  - Recording Super Slow Motion: 640 × 480 (120 frame/s), 320 × 240 (240 frame/s)
- Continuous shooting, P mode continuous shooting: ~2.3 shot/s. High-speed burst mode in HQ continuous shooting: ~9.6 shot/s.

Preceded by S95	Canon Powershot Compact S series September 2011 - September 2012	Succeeded by S110
