= Canon PowerShot SX280 HS =

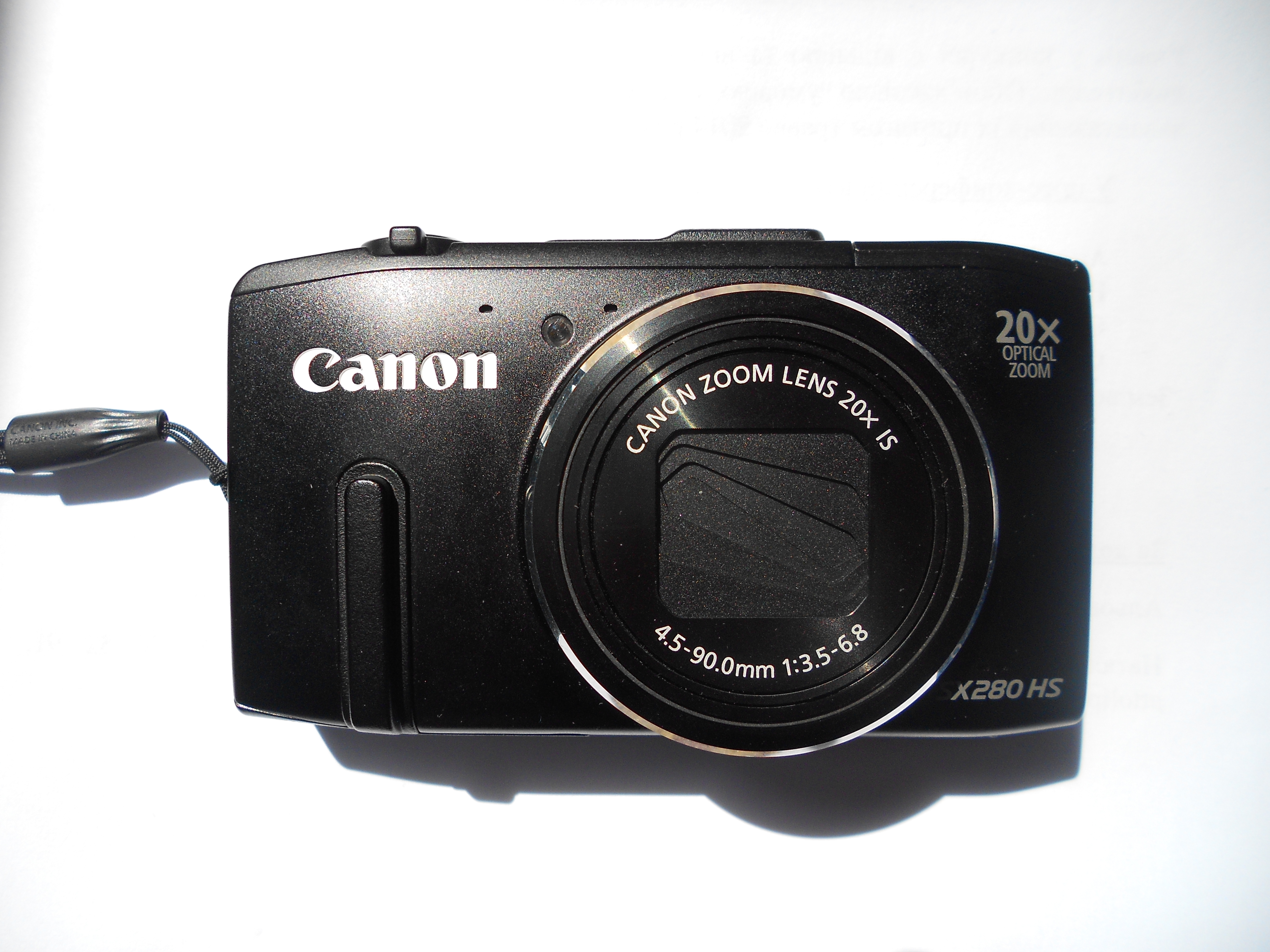

Overview
- Maker: Canon
- Type: Point-and-shoot

Lens
- Lens: Fixed
- F-numbers: f/3.5 to f/6.8

Sensor/medium
- Sensor type: BSI-CMOS
- Sensor size: 1/2.3" (6.17 x 4.55 mm)
- Maximum resolution: 12 MP
- Film speed: 100 – 6400
- Recording medium: SD card

Focusing
- Focus modes: Automatic or manual

Flash
- Flash: Yes

Shutter
- Frame rate: 3.8
- Shutter speeds: 1/3200 to 15 s
- Continuous shooting: Yes

Viewfinder
- Electronic viewfinder: 3", 461,000 pixel

Image processing
- Image processor: DIGIC 6
- White balance: 6 presets plus custom

General
- Video recording: 1080p at 60 or 30 fps, 720p at 30 fps, 640 x 480 at 30 or 120 fps, 320 x 240 at 240 fps
- AV port: Mini HDMI
- Data port: USB 2.0
- Dimensions: 106×63×33 mm (4.2×2.5×1.3 in)
- Weight: 233 g (8.22 oz)

The Canon PowerShot SX280 HS compact zoom camera created by Canon. The camera has a 20x zoom, has GPS and records in full HD video.

== See also ==
- Canon PowerShot S for related models
