= Canon PowerShot S =

Digital camera product line by Canon

The Canon PowerShot S is a series of digital cameras released by Canon, as part of the wider PowerShot range. The S-series was originally a line of compact point-and-shoot cameras, slowly evolving into a prosumer line of cameras slotting right beneath the G-series cameras. The line later branched off into Canon's line of super-zoom cameras. The PowerShot ELPH line is a branch of the S-series, due to its model number designations in the United States (with the S- and SD- prefixes), as well as the similarities between the PowerShot ELPH S100 and the PowerShot S10.

== G-series in a compact body ==
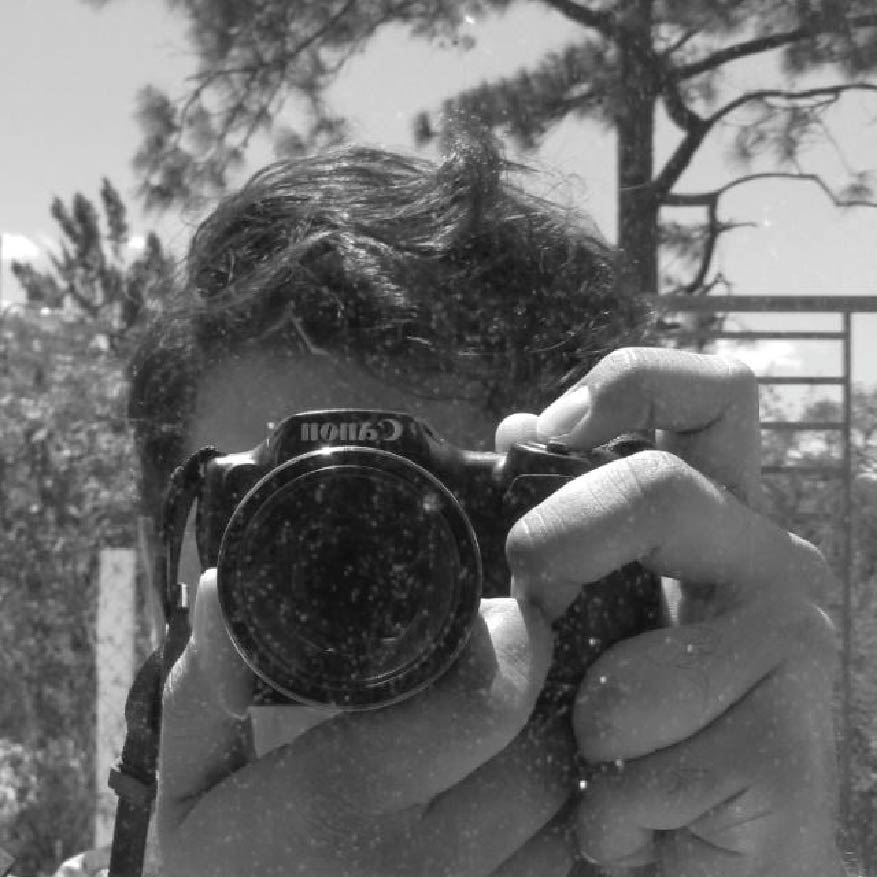
A photographer using a PowerShot SX430 IS model.

From the PowerShot S90 onwards the S-series continues a line of Canon compact digital cameras that commenced with the Ixus 900Ti and feature the Digic image processors and larger than average sensors as fitted to the advanced PowerShot G-series cameras. The Ixus / S-series and the equivalent G-series models are listed below:

- Ixus 900Ti (SD900)* / PowerShot G7 / Digic III / 10 MP 3648 × 2736 1/1.8″ CCD.
- Ixus 960IS (SD950IS)* / PowerShot G9 / Digic III / 12.1 MP 4000 × 3000 1/1.7″ CCD.
- Ixus 980IS (SD990IS) / PowerShot G10 / Digic 4 / 14.7 MP 4416 × 3312 1/1.7″ CCD.
- PowerShot S90, S95, S200 / PowerShot G11, G12 / Digic 4 / 10 MP 3648 × 2736 1/1.7″ CCD (S200 features Digic 5).
- PowerShot S100, S110 / PowerShot G15 / Digic 5 / 12.1 MP 4000×3000 1/1.7" CMOS.
- Powershot S120 / PowerShot G16 / Digic 6 / 12.1 MP 4000×3000 1/1.7" CMOS.

(* The Ixus 900Ti and 960IS feature a titanium body.)

== Models ==
=== Compact S series ===
The Sxx series is made up of two sub-series. The S10 and S20 were compact point-and-shoot cameras, while the S30-onwards were prosumer digital cameras that were the de-contented, lower-cost alternative to the equivalent G-series camera at the time.

Model	Release date	Sensor resolution, size, type	Video specifications	Lens (35 mm equiv) zoom, aperture	Image processor	LCD screen size, pixels	Card	Size W×H×D (mm)	Weight (body, g)	Photo	Notes
Point-and-Shoot
S10	October 1999	2.1 MP; 1600×1200; 1/2" CCD	No movie mode	35–70 mm (2×) f/2.8–4.0		1.8"	CF	105.4 × 69.4 × 33.8	270		Smallest true zoom 2 MP camera when released
S20	March 2000	3.3 MP; 2048×1536; 1/1.8" CCD	No movie mode	32–64 mm (2×) f/2.9–4.0		1.8"	CF	105.4 × 69.4 × 33.8	270		
Prosumer
S30	September 2001	3.2 MP; 2048×1536; 1/1.8" CCD	320x240 15 fps	35–105 mm (3×) f/2.8–4.9		1.8"	CF	112 × 58 × 42	260		New larger body shape, addition of manual controls, added RAW support
S40	October 2001	4.1 MP; 2272×1704; 1/1.8" CCD	320x240 15 fps	35–105 mm (3×) f/2.8–4.9		1.8"	CF	112 × 58 × 42	260		
S45	October 2002	4.1 MP; 2272×1704; 1/1.8" CCD	320x240 15 fps	35–105 mm (3×) f/2.8–4.9	DIGIC	1.8"	CF	112 × 58 × 42	260		
S50	March 2003	5.0 MP; 2592×1944; 1/1.8" CCD	320x240 15 fps	35–105 mm (3×) f/2.8–4.9	DIGIC	1.8"	CF	112 × 58 × 42	260		
S60	June 2004	5.0 MP; 2592×1944; 1/1.8" CCD	640x480 10 fps 320x240 15 fps	28–100 mm (3.6×) f/2.8–5.3	DIGIC	1.8"	CF	114.0 × 56.5 × 38.8	230		First to use wide-angle lens, supports conversion lenses, smaller and lighter body with re-arranged rear panel
S70	September 2004	7.1 MP; 3072×2304; 1/1.8" CCD	640x480 10 fps 320x240 15 fps	28–100 mm (3.6×) f/2.8–5.3	DIGIC	1.8"	CF	114.0 × 56.5 × 38.8	230		
S80	October 2005	8.0 MP; 3264×2448; 1/1.8" CCD	1024×768 15 fps 640x480 30 fps	28–100 mm (3.6×) f/2.8–5.3	DIGIC II	2.5"; 115,000	SD, MMC	104.0 × 57.0 × 38.8	225		Redesigned smaller and lighter body, no RAW support. Includes new 4:3 HD Movie (1024x768) Mode Bears similarity to later Powershot G series models such as G10 & G11
S90	September 2009	10.0 MP; 3648×2736; 1/1.7" CCD	640x480 30 fps	28–105 mm (3.8×) f/2.0–4.9	DIGIC 4	3.0"; 461,000	SD, SDHC, MMC, MMC+, HC MMC+	100.0 × 58.4 × 30.9	175		New High Sensitivity System and higher ISO speeds, f/2.0 lens, image stabilization. HD movie feature removed. Bears similarity to earlier Powershot SD series models
S95	August 2010	10.0 MP; 3648×2736; 1/1.7" CCD	720p 24 fps	28–105 mm (3.8×) f/2.0–4.9	DIGIC 4	3.0"; 461,000	SD, SDHC, MMC, MMC+, HC MMC+	99.8 × 58.4 × 29.5	170		Hybrid IS, 720p HD video.
S100	September 2011	12.1 MP; 4000×3000; 1/1.7" CMOS	1080p 24 fps 720p 30 fps 640x480 120 fps 320x240 240 fps	24–120 mm (5×) f/2.0–5.9	DIGIC 5	3.0"; 461,000	SD, SDHC, SDXC, Eye-Fi	98.9 × 59.8 × 26.7	173		GPS, 1080p HD video. Not to be confused with the older S100, the first Digital IXUS/ELPH camera.
S110	September 2012	12.1 MP; 4000×3000; 1/1.7" CMOS	1080p 24 fps 720p 30 fps 640x480 120 fps 320x240 240 fps	24–120 mm (5×) f/2.0–5.9	DIGIC 5	3.0" 461,000 touch screen	SD, SDHC, SDXC, Eye-Fi	98.8 × 59.0 × 26.9	173		No GPS, 1080p HD video. IS. Wifi. Touch screen.
S120	August 2013	12.1 MP; 4000×3000; 1/1.7" BSI-CMOS	1080p 60 fps 640x480 120 fps 320x240 240 fps	24–120 mm (5×) f/1.8–5.7	DIGIC 6	3.0" 922,000 touch screen	SD, SDHC, SDXC	100.2 × 59.0 × 29.0	193		WiFi. Touch screen. Maximum aperture 1.8.
S200	February 2014	10.0 MP; 3648x2736 1/1.7" CCD	720p 24 fps 640x480 30 fps	24–120 mm (5×) f/2.0–5.9	DIGIC 5	3.0" 461,000	SD, SDHC, SDXC	100.0 × 59.0 × 26.0	181		WiFi. No RAW. 720p HD video.

=== Super Zoom S/SX series ===
The S1 to SX70 series consists of ultra-zoom cameras, having longer zoom ranges and a more extensive list of features. The SX100 and later SX models are a more compact, affordable spin-off. The "SX" stands for "Super Zoom." All S and SX models feature image stabilization, and most have full manual controls.

Model	Release date	Sensor resolution, size, type	Video Specification	Lens (35 mm equiv) zoom, aperture	Image processor	LCD screen size, pixels	Card	Size W×H×D (mm)	Weight (body, g)	Photo	Notes
Sx / SXx series
S1 IS	March 2004	3.2 MP; 2048×1536; 1/2.7" CCD	640x480 30 fps	38–380 (10×) f/2.8–3.1	DIGIC	1.5" vari-angle 114,000	CF	111.0 × 78.0 × 66.1	370		First in the series
S2 IS	June 2005	5.0 MP; 2592×1944; 1/2.5" CCD	640x480 30 fps	36–432 (12×) f/2.7–3.5	DIGIC II	1.8" vari-angle 115,000	SD	113 × 78.0 × 75.5	405		
S3 IS	February 2006	6.0 MP; 2816×2112; 1/2.5" CCD	640x480 30 fps 320x240 60 fps	36–432 (12×) f/2.7–3.5	DIGIC II	2.0" vari-angle 115,000	SD, SDHC, MMC	113.4 × 78.0 × 75.5	410		
S5 IS	June 2007	8.0 MP; 3264x2448 1/2.5" CCD	640x480 30 fps 320x240 60 fps	36–432 (12×) f/2.7–3.5	DIGIC III	2.5" vari-angle 207,000	SD, SDHC, MMC	117.0 × 80.0 × 77.7	450		First S series with hotshoe
SX1 IS	December 2008	10 MP; 3648×2736; 1/2.3" CMOS	1080p 30 fps	28–560 (20×) f/2.8–5.7	DIGIC 4	2.8" vari-angle 230,000	SD, SDHC, MMC, MMC+, HC MMC+	128 × 88 × 88	585		Replaces S5 IS, first PowerShot to use CMOS, firmware update allows shooting in RAW, and full HD 1080p recording support
SX10 IS	October 2008	10 MP; 3648×2736; 1/2.3" CCD	640x480 30 fps	28–560 (20×) f/2.8–5.7	DIGIC 4	2.5" vari-angle 230,000	SD, SDHC, MMC, MMC+, HC MMC+	124 × 88 × 87	560		Replaces S5 IS
SX20 IS	August 2009	12 MP; 4000×3000; 1/2.3" CCD	720p 30 fps	28–560 (20×) f/2.8–5.7	DIGIC 4	2.5" vari-angle 230,000	SD, SDHC, MMC, MMC+, HC MMC+	124 × 88 × 87	560		Replaces SX10 IS
SX30 IS	September 2010	14.1 MP; 4320×3240; 1/2.3" CCD	720p 30 fps	24-840 (35×) f/2.7-5.8	DIGIC 4	2.7" vari-angle 230,000	SD, SDHC, SDXC, MMC, MMC+, HC MMC+	122.9 × 92.4 × 107.7	601		Replaces SX20 IS
SX40 HS	September 2011	12.1 MP; 4000×3000; 1/2.3" CMOS	1080p 24 fps 720p 30 fps 640x480 120 fps 320x240 240 fps	24-840 (35×) f/2.7-5.8	DIGIC 5	2.7" vari-angle 230,000	SD, SDHC, SDXC, MMC, MMC+, HC MMC+, Eye-Fi	122.9 × 92.4 × 107.7	600		Replaces SX1/SX30 IS
SX50 HS	September 2012	12.1 MP; 4000×3000; 1/2.3" CMOS	1080p 24 fps 720p 30 fps 640x480 120 fps 320x240 240 fps	24-1200 (50x) f/3.4-6.5	DIGIC 5	2.8" vari-angle 461,000	SD, SDHC, SDXC	122.5 × 87.3 × 105.5	595		Replaces SX40 HS
SX60 HS	September 2014	16.1 MP; 4608 × 3456; 1/2.3" CMOS	1080p 60 fps 640x480 120 fps 320x240 240 fps	21-1365 (65×) f/3.4-6.5	DIGIC 6	3.0" vari-angle 922,000	SD, SDHC, SDXC	127 mm × 91 mm × 114 mm	649		Replaces SX50 HS
SX70 HS	22 October 2018	20.3 MP; 5184 × 3888; 1/2.3" CMOS	1080p 60 fps 4K 30 fps	21-1365 (65×) f/3.4-6.5	DIGIC 8	3.0" vari-angle 922,000	SD, SDHC, SDXC	127 mm × 90.9 mm × 116.6 mm	610		Replaces SX60 HS
SX100 series (2007–2013, economic superzooms)
SX100 IS	August 2007	8.0 MP; 3264×2448; 1/2.5" CCD	640x480 30 fps	36–360 (10×) f/2.8–4.3	DIGIC III	2.5" fixed 172,000	SD, SDHC, MMC, MMC+, HC MMC+	108.7 × 71.4 × 46.7	265		Smaller spin-off of SX series
SX110 IS	September 2008	9.0 MP; 3456×2592; 1/2.3" CCD	640x480 30 fps	36–360 (10×) f/2.8–4.3	DIGIC III	3.0" fixed 230,000	SD, SDHC, MMC, MMC+, HC MMC+	111 × 71 × 45	265		
SX120 IS	August 2009	10.0 MP; 3648×2736; 1/2.5" CCD	640x480 30 fps	36–360 (10×) f/2.8–4.3	DIGIC 4	3.0" fixed 230,000	SD, SDHC, MMC, MMC+, HC MMC+	111 × 71 × 45	245		
SX130 IS	September 2010	12.1 MP; 4000x3000 1/2.3" CCD (C677 12 MP)	720p 30 fps	28–336 mm (12x) f/3.4-5.6	DIGIC 4	3.0" fixed 230,000	SD, SDHC, MMC, MMC+, HC MMC+	113.3 × 73.2 × 45.8	260		Replaces SX120 IS
SX150 IS	August 2011	14.1 MP; 4320 × 3240; 1/2.3" CCD	720p 30 fps	28–336 mm (12x) f/3.4-5.6	DIGIC 4	3.0" fixed 230,000	SD, SDHC, SDXC, MMC, MMC+, HC MMC+, Eye-Fi	113.3 × 73.2 × 45.8	258		Replaces SX130 IS
SX160 IS	September 2012	16.0 MP; 4608 × 3456; 1/2.3" CCD	720p 25 fps 640x480 30 fps	28–448 mm (16x) f/3.5-5.9	DIGIC 4	3.0" fixed 230,000	SD, SDHC, SDXC, MMC, MMC+, HC MMC+, Eye-Fi	111.0 × 72.5 × 44.1	291		Replaces SX150 IS
SX170 IS	2013	16.0 MP; 4608 × 3456; 1/2.3" CCD	720p 25 fps 640x480 30 fps	28–448 mm (16x) f/3.5-5.9	DIGIC 4	3.0" fixed 230,000	SD, SDHC, SDXC, MMC, MMC+, HC MMC+, Eye-Fi	108.0 × 71 × 43.9	228		The only one in SX100-series that uses a Li-ion battery
SX200 series (2009–2013, advanced pocketable superzooms)
SX200 IS	March 2009	12.1 MP; 4000x3000 1/2.3" CCD (C677 12 MP)	720p 30 fps	28–336 (12x) f/3.4–5.3	DIGIC 4	3.0" fixed 230,000	SD, SDHC, MMC, MMC+, HC MMC+	103 × 61 × 38	220		Adds HD video
SX210 IS	March 2010	14.1 MP; 4320×3240; 1/2.3" CCD	720p 30 fps	28–392 (14×) f/3.1–5.9	DIGIC 4	3.0" fixed 230,000	SD, SDHC, SDXC, MMC, MMC+, HC MMC+	106 × 59 × 32	215		
SX220 HS	February 2011	12.1 MP; 4000x3000 1/2.3" CMOS	1080p 24 fps 720p 30 fps 640x480 120 fps 320x240 240 fps	28–392 (14×) f/3.1–5.9	DIGIC 4	3.0" fixed 461,000	SD, SDHC, SDXC, MMC, MMC+, HC MMC+, Eye-Fi	106 × 59 × 33	215		No GPS
SX230 HS	February 2011	12.1 MP; 4000x3000 1/2.3" CMOS	1080p 24 fps 720p 30 fps 640x480 120 fps 320x240 240 fps	28–392 (14×) f/3.1–5.9	DIGIC 4	3.0" fixed 461,000	SD, SDHC, SDXC, MMC, MMC+, HC MMC+, Eye-Fi	106 × 59 × 33	215		Adds GPS
SX240 HS	February 2012	12.1 MP; 4000x3000 1/2.3" CMOS	1080p 24 fps 720p 30 fps 640x480 120 fps 320x240 240 fps	25–500 (20×) f/3.5–6.8	DIGIC 5	3.0" fixed 461,000	SD, SDHC, SDXC, Eye-Fi	106 × 61 × 33	224		No GPS. Not sold in North America; the GPS-equipped SX260 HS, otherwise identical to this model, is sold there instead.
SX260 HS	February 2012	12.1 MP; 4000x3000 1/2.3" CMOS	1080p 24 fps 720p 30 fps 640x480 120 fps 320x240 240 fps	25–500 (20×) f/3.5–6.8	DIGIC 5	3.0" fixed 461,000	SD, SDHC, SDXC, Eye-Fi	106 × 61 × 33	231		Adds GPS
SX270 HS	April 2013	12.1 MP; 4000x3000 1/2.3" CMOS	1080p 60 fps 640x480 120 fps 320x240 240 fps	25–500 (20×) f/3.5–6.8	DIGIC 6	3.0" fixed 461,000	SD, SDHC, SDXC	106.4 × 61.1 × 32.6	227		With GPS. There is also Wi-Fi. But not sold in North America; the GPS- is also equipped in SX280 HS and it is sold there instead.
SX280 HS	April 2013	12.1 MP; 4000x3000 1/2.3" CMOS	1080p 60 fps 640x480 120 fps 320x240 240 fps	25–500 (20×) f/3.5–6.8	DIGIC 6	3.0" fixed 461,000	SD, SDHC, SDXC	106.4 × 62.8 × 32.6	233		With GPS and Wi-fi
SX400 series (2014-, cheaper alternative to the SX500-series, no manual controls, CCD-sensors)
SX400 IS	October 2014	16.0 MP; 4608x3456 1/2.3" CCD	720p 25 fps 640x480 30 fps	24-720 (30x) f/3.4-5.8	DIGIC 4+	3.0" fixed 230,000	SD, SDHC, SDXC	104.4 × 69.1 × 80.1	313		No Wi-Fi or GPS, Very similar to SX500 IS
SX410 IS	February 2015	20.0 MP; 5152x3864 1/2.3" CCD	720p 25 fps 640x480 30 fps	24-960 (40x) f/3.5-6.3	DIGIC 4+	3.0" fixed 230,000	SD, SDHC, SDXC	104.4 × 69.1 × 85.1	325		No Wi-Fi or GPS
SX420 IS	January 2016	20.0 MP; 5152x3864 1/2.3" CCD	720p 25 fps 640x480 30 fps	24-1008 (42x) f/3.5-6.6	DIGIC 4+	3.0" fixed 230,000	SD, SDHC, SDXC	104 × 69 × 85	325		WiFI
SX430 IS	January 2017	20.0 MP; 5152x3864 1/2.3" CCD	720p 25 fps 640x480 30 fps	24-1080 (45x) f/3.5-6.8	DIGIC 4+	3.0" fixed 230,000	SD, SDHC, SDXC	104.4 × 69.1 × 85.1	323		WiFi
SX500 series (2012-, cheaper and lighter alternative to SXx series)
SX500 IS	April 2012	16.0 MP; 4608x3456 1/2.3" CCD	720p 25 fps 640x480 30 fps	24-720 (30x) f/3.4-5.8	DIGIC 4	3.0" fixed 461,000	SD, SDHC, SDXC	104.0 × 69.5 × 80.2	341		Improved Autofocus (AF). Not compatible for SD/SDHC Memory cards exceeding 8 GB capacity.
SX510 HS	August 2013	12.1 MP; 4000x3000 1/2.3" CMOS	1080p 24 fps 720p 30 fps 640x480 120 fps 320x240 240 fps	24-720 (30x) f/3.4-5.8	DIGIC 4	3.0" fixed 461,000	SD, SDHC, SDXC	104.0 × 69.5 × 80.2	349		Adds Wi-Fi
SX520 HS	2014	16.0 MP; 4608x3456 1/2.3" CMOS	1080p 30 fps	24-1008 (42x) f/3.4-5.8	DIGIC 4+	3.0" fixed 461,000	SD, SDHC, SDXC	119.0 × 81.0 × 91.0	442		No Wi-Fi
SX530 HS	January 2015	16.0 MP; 4608x3456 1/2.3" CMOS	1080p 30 fps	24–1200 (50×) f/3.4–6.5	DIGIC 4+	3.0" fixed 461,000	SD, SDHC, SDXC	120.0 × 81.7 × 91.9	442		Wi-Fi but no GPS. GPS via linked compatible smartphone ("camera connect").
SX540 HS	January 2016	20.2 MP; 5184 × 3888; 1/2.3" CMOS	1080p 60 fps	24–1200 (50×) f/3.4–6.5	DIGIC 6	3.0" fixed 461,000	SD, SDHC, SDXC	120.0 × 81.7 × 91.9	442		Wi-Fi but no GPS. GPS via linked compatible smartphone ("camera connect").
SX600 series (2014–, cheaper alternative to the SX700 series, no manual controls)
SX600 HS	2014	16.0 MP; 4608×3456; 1/2.3" CMOS	1080p 30 fps	25–450 (18×) f/3.8–6.9	DIGIC 4+	3.0" fixed 461,000	SD, SDHC, SDXC	103.8 × 61.0 × 26.0	188		
SX610 HS	January 2015	20.2 MP; 5184x3888 1/2.3" CMOS	1080p 30 fps	25–450 (18×) f/3.8–6.9	DIGIC 4+	3.0" fixed 922,000	SD, SDHC, SDXC	105.3 × 61.0 × 26.7	191		
SX620 HS	May 2016	20.2 MP; 5184x3888 1/2.3" CMOS	1080p 30 fps	25-625 (25x) f/3.2-6.6	DIGIC 4+	3.0" fixed 922,000	SD, SDHC, SDXC	96.9 x 56.9 x 27.9	182		
SX700 series (2014-, successor to the SX200-series)
SX700 HS	2014	16.0 MP; 4608x3456 1/2.3" CMOS	1080p 60 fps 640x480 120 fps 320x240 240 fps	25-750 (30x) f/3.2-6.9	DIGIC 6	3.0" fixed 922,000	SD, SDHC, SDXC	112.7 × 65.8 × 34.8	245		Remote shooting through WiFi
SX710 HS	January 2015	20.3 MP; 5184x3888 1/2.3" CMOS	1080p 60 fps 640x480 120 fps 320x240 240 fps	25-750 (30x) f/3.2-6.9	DIGIC 6	3.0" fixed 922,000	SD, SDHC, SDXC	112.7 × 65.8 × 34.8	269		
SX720 HS	February 2016	20.3 MP; 5184x3888 1/2.3" CMOS	1080p 60 fps 640x480 120 fps 320x240 240 fps	24-960 (40x) f/3.3-6.9	DIGIC 6	3.0" fixed 922,000	SD, SDHC, SDXC	109.7 x 63.8 x 35.7	270		
SX730 HS	April 2017	20.3 MP; 5184x3888 1/2.3" CMOS	1080p 60 fps 640x480 120 fps 320x240 240 fps	24-960 (40x) f/3.3-6.9	DIGIC 6	3.0" tilting 922,000	SD, SDHC, SDXC	110.1 x 63.8 x 39.9	300		
SX740 HS	August 2018	20.3 MP; 5184x3888 1/2.3" CMOS	1080p 60 fps 4K 30 fps	24-960 (40x) f/3.3-6.9	DIGIC 8	3.0" tilting 922,000	SD, SDHC, SDXC	110.1 x 63.8 x 39.9	299		4K video

== See also ==
- Canon PowerShot
- Canon PowerShot A
- Canon PowerShot G
- Canon PowerShot SD or Digital Elph
- List of digital cameras with CCD sensors
