= Canon PowerShot S95 =

Overview
- Maker: Canon Inc.
- Type: Digital Camera sensor = 1/1.7" CCD

Lens
- Lens: 6.0–22.5 mm (35mm equivalent: 28–105 mm) f/2.0–f/4.9

Sensor/medium
- Maximum resolution: 3648 × 2736 (10.0 megapixels)
- Film speed: Auto, ISO 80 – 3200 (in 1/3-step increments)
- Storage media: Secure Digital card

Focusing
- Focus modes: Single, Continuous (only available in Auto mode), Servo AF/AEl
- Focus areas: TTL (9-point AiAF) 1-point AF (fixed to centre)

Exposure/metering
- Metering modes: Evaluative, Center-weighted average, Spot (fixed to center)

Flash
- Flash: 50 cm – 6.5 m (wide), 90 cm – 3.0 m (tele)

Shutter
- Shutter: Mechanical shutter and electronic shutter
- Shutter speed range: 1/1600 – 1 sec. (Auto mode), 1/1600 to 15 sec.
- Continuous shooting: Approx. 0.9 frame/s

Image processing
- White balance: Auto, Daylight, Cloudy, Tungsten, Fluorescent, Fluorescent H, Flash, Underwater, Custom

General
- LCD screen: 3.0-inch TFT color LCD, approx. 461,000 dots
- Battery: Canon NB-6L Li-Ion
- Optional battery packs: AC Adapter Kit ACK-DC40
- Dimensions: 99.8×58.4×29.5 mm (3.93×2.30×1.16 in) (W * H * D)
- Weight: 193 g (6.8 oz) excluding battery
- Made in: Japan

The Canon PowerShot S95 is a high-end 10.0-megapixel compact digital camera announced and released in 2010. It was designed as the successor to the Canon PowerShot S90 in the S series of the Canon PowerShot line of cameras.

This model is considered high-end, professional, or prosumer because of its price, its feature set, and its high-sensitivity image sensor. Its 10-megapixel image sensor is larger than typical sensors found in point-and-shoot cameras. This, along with the advanced image stabilization system, allows for sharp images in lower light scenarios, at an ISO of up to 3,200.

The S95 is similar to the S90, but adds a number of refinements. Among other things, it features a thinner body, improved image stabilization, an automated HDR shooting mode, 720p HD-quality video recording with stereo sound, and a more ergonomic finish and controls.

Other features include a tracking autofocus function, enabling it to track and focus on moving subjects.

== Features ==
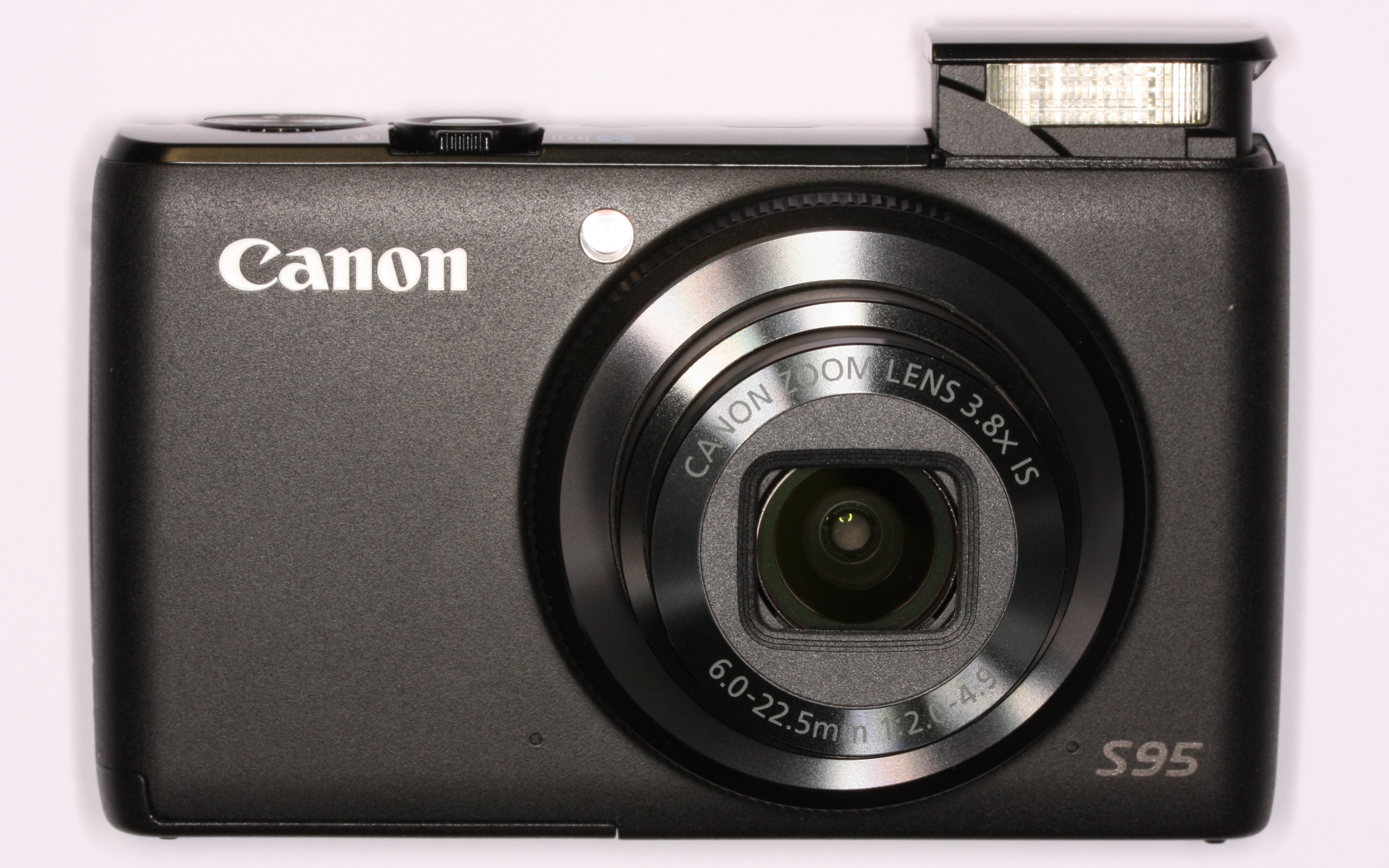
Front

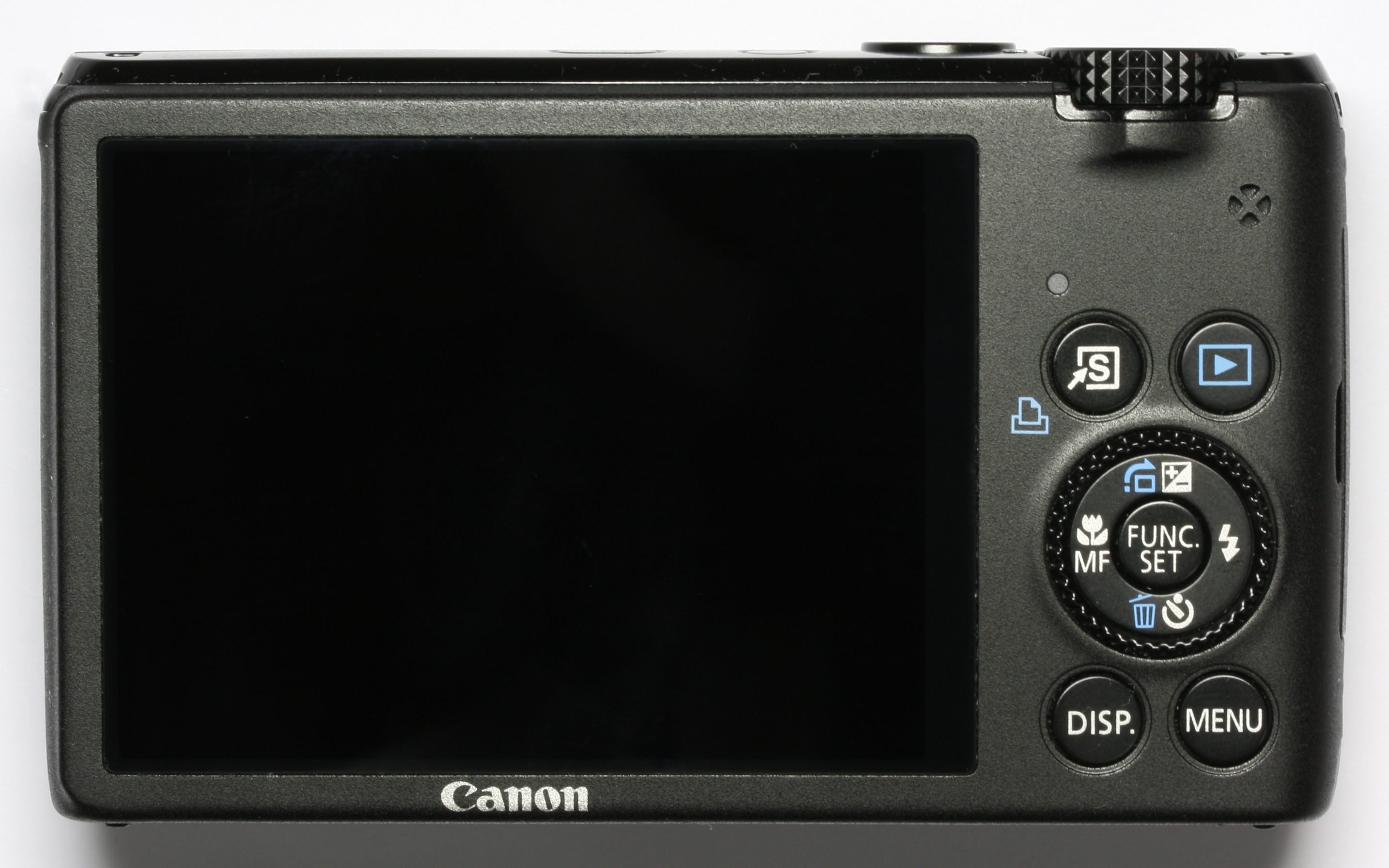
Rear

- 10.0 megapixels
- JPEG (Exif 2.3) support
- Raw image file format; one of few "point-and-shoot" cameras to have raw formatting. (Note: Raw format is not available in Auto, Low Light, and SCN modes. Raw is available in Program, Tv (shutter priority), Av (aperture priority), Manual, and Custom modes)
- ISO sensitivity 80–3200 and auto (in 1/3-step increments). Low-light mode can shoot up to ISO 12800 (at lower resolution).
- Wide-angle zoom lens: 5–50 cm (wide), 30–50 cm (tele)
- Full manual control
- Customizable Control Ring to control ISO, shutter speed, aperture, focus, or exposure compensation
- Five photo aspect ratios: 16:9, 3:2, 4:3, 1:1, 4:5
- Video recording Standard, Color Accent, Color Swap: 1280 x 720 (24 frame/s), 640 × 480 (30 frame/s), 320 × 240 (30 frame/s)
- Video recording Miniature Effect: 1280 x 720 (6 / 3 / 1.5 frame/s), 640 × 480 (6 / 3 / 1.5 frame/s)
- Continuous shooting, P mode continuous shooting: ~1.9 shot/s. Low Light mode continuous shooting: ~3.9 shot/s.

=== Hybrid IS ===
The S95 is the first compact camera to feature Hybrid IS, which minimizes the impact of camera shake on image quality. There are two types of camera shake: angular shake and lateral shake. The PowerShot S95's Hybrid IS stabilizes both types of camera shake by using a dedicated acceleration sensor to detect lateral shake. Because Hybrid IS is effective in reducing noticeable lateral shake at short shooting distances (where shooting magnification is high), the camera is able to greatly stabilize images at all shooting distances.

=== High-dynamic-range imaging ===
The S95 is one of the first camera models to feature an automated high dynamic range (HDR) shooting mode. This advanced digital imaging technique shoots three bracketed exposures in quick succession, and then automatically composites them for an increased dynamic range and more vivid coloration. HDR should be used on a tripod, to prevent blur.

== Similar cameras ==
In the high-end compact camera market, its main competitor is the Panasonic Lumix DMC-LX5; one significant difference being that the S95 is significantly slimmer due to the fully collapsible lens, hence more portable.

The Canon PowerShot G series (as of November 2010, the G12) are similar in terms of target market and features, but feature a larger body and an optical viewfinder.

A similar category to high-end compact cameras are mirrorless interchangeable lens cameras ("MILCs"), some of which are in a compact form factor (with a similar-sized body), such as the Panasonic Lumix DMC-GF1, Olympus PEN E-P1/E-P2, and Sony Alpha NEX-3. MILCs differ however in being significantly larger (with lens attached), and significantly higher-end, featuring much larger sensors and interchangeable lenses.

== See also ==
- List of digital cameras with CCD sensors

Preceded by S90	Canon Powershot Compact S series August 2010 - September 2011	Succeeded by S100
