= Canon PowerShot S90 =

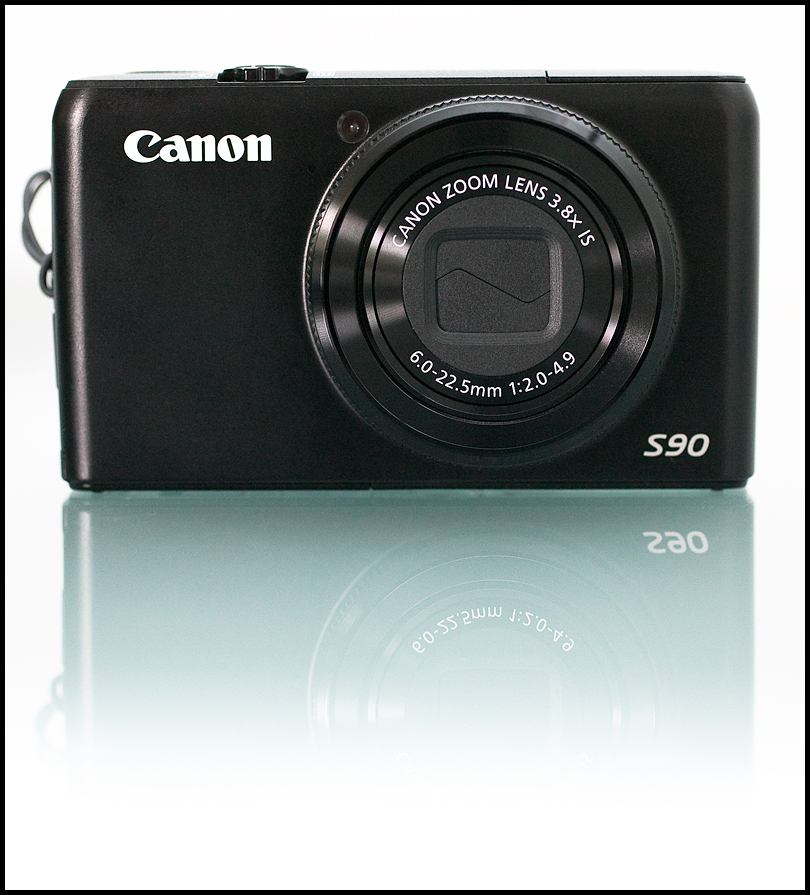

Overview
- Maker: Canon Inc.
- Type: Digital camera

Lens
- Lens: 6.0–22.5 mm (35mm equivalent: 28–105 mm) f/2.0–f/4.9

Sensor/medium
- Sensor: 1/1.7" CCD
- Maximum resolution: 3648 × 2736 (10.0 megapixels)
- Film speed: ISO 80, 100, 125, 160, 200, 250, 320, 400, 500, 640, 800, 1000, 1250, 1600, 2000, 2500, 3200
- Storage media: Secure Digital card

Focusing
- Focus modes: Single, Continuous (only available in Auto mode), Servo AF/AEl
- Focus areas: TTL (9-point AiAF) 1-point AF (fixed to centre)

Exposure/metering
- Exposure metering: Evaluative, Center-Weighted Average, Spot
- Metering modes: Evaluative, Centre-weighted average, Spot (Centre)

Flash
- Flash: Internal

Shutter
- Shutter speed range: 1/1600 sec–15 sec
- Continuous shooting: Approx. 0.9 frame/s

Image processing
- White balance: Auto, Daylight, Cloudy, Tungsten, Fluorescent, Fluorescent H, Flash, Underwater, Custom

General
- LCD screen: 3.0-inch Purecolor LCD II (TFT) appro. 461,000 dots
- Battery: Canon NB-6L Li-Ion
- Optional battery packs: AC Adapter Kit ACK-DC40
- Dimensions: 100.0×58.4×30.9 mm (3.94×2.30×1.22 in) (W * H * D)
- Weight: 175 g (6.2 oz) excluding battery
- Made in: Japan

The Canon PowerShot S90 is a high-end 10.0-megapixel compact digital camera originally announced in 2009. The PowerShot S90 is the successor of the Canon PowerShot S80.

The almost four-year gap between the S80 and the S90, compared with intervals of six months to one year between prior versions, led to the line being popularly considered discontinued, and thus the S90 as a revival, rather than a strict successor.

== Features ==
- 10.0 megapixels
- JPEG (Exif 2.2) support
- Raw image file format; one of few "point and shoot" cameras to have raw formatting. (Note: Raw format is not available in Auto, Low Light, and SCN modes. Raw is available in Program, TV (shutter priority), Av (aperture priority), Manual, and Custom modes)
- ISO sensitivity 80–3200 and auto. Low light mode can shoot up to ISO 12800.
- Wide-angle zoom lens 6.0–22.5 mm (35 mm equivalent: 28–105 mm)
- Full manual control
- Customizable Control Ring to control ISO, shutter speed, aperture, focus, or exposure compensation
- DIGIC 4 with iSAPS technology
- Video recording 640 × 480 at 30 frame/s, 320 × 240 at 30 frame/s

== Reception ==
The S90 has received good, in some cases excellent reviews, with reviewers praising its image quality, small size, and ease of using manual mode, particularly due to its distinctive control ring. The fast (f/2) lens and the decision to reduce the pixel count (hence reducing noise; also found in the G11) are particularly cited. The primary criticisms, beyond the general limitations of small sensor and small size, are that its ergonomics are lacking, and in particular that the rear dial moves too easily, changing exposure and often ruining photos.

To address the ergonomic criticisms, third parties have developed a custom grip to make the camera easier to grip, and a plastic ring to surround the control dial, making the dial less likely to be accidentally moved.

== Similar cameras ==
In the high-end compact camera market, its main competitor is the Panasonic Lumix DMC-LX3 (and the Lumix's sister camera, the Leica D-Lux 4); one significant difference being that the S90 is significantly slimmer due to the fully collapsible lens, hence more portable.

The Canon PowerShot S95 was announced and released in 2010. It was designed as the successor to the Canon PowerShot S90.

The Canon PowerShot G series (as of June 2010, the G11) are similar in terms of target market, but feature a larger body and slower optics at the wide angle end.

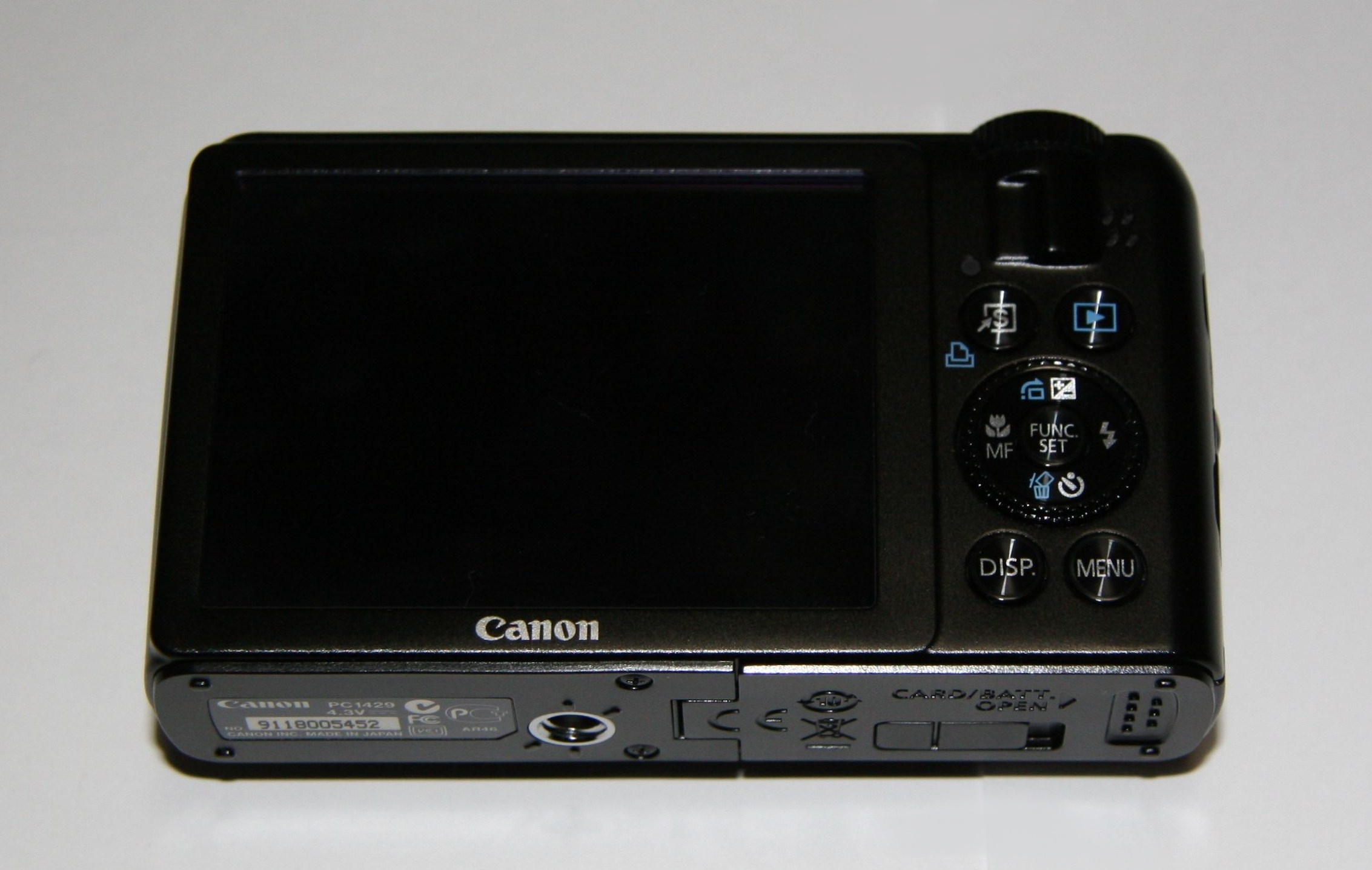
PowerShot S90 rear view

A similar category to high-end compact cameras are mirrorless interchangeable lens cameras ("micros"), some of which are in a compact form factor (with a similar-sized body), such as the Panasonic Lumix DMC-GF1, Olympus PEN E-P1/E-P2, and Sony Alpha NEX-3. Micros differ however in being significantly larger (with lens attached), and significantly higher-end, featuring much larger sensors and interchangeable lenses.

== See also ==
- List of digital cameras with CCD sensors

Preceded by S80	Canon Powershot Compact S series September 2009 – August 2010	Succeeded by S95
