= Canon PowerShot S110 =

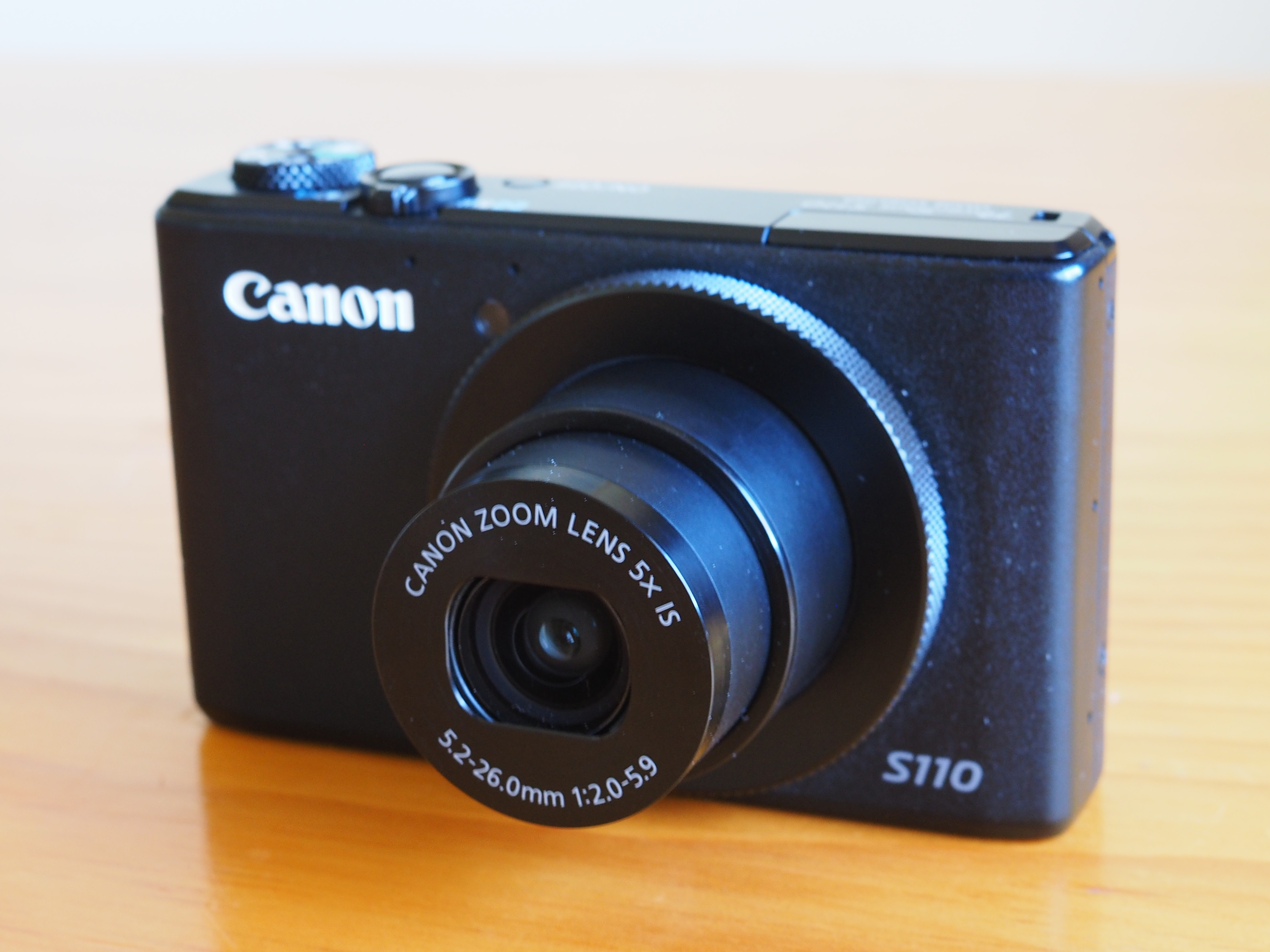

Overview
- Maker: Canon Inc.
- Type: Digital Camera
- Intro price: US$399.99

Lens
- Lens: 5.2–26.0 mm f/2.0–f/5.9 (35 mm equivalent: 24–120 mm f/9.3–f/27.4)

Sensor/medium
- Sensor: 1/1,7" CMOS (7.4 x 5.6 mm)
- Maximum resolution: 4000 × 3000 (12.1 megapixels)
- Film speed: Auto, ISO 80–6400 (in 1/3-step increments)
- Storage media: Secure Digital card

Focusing
- Focus modes: Single, Continuous (only available in Auto mode), Servo AF/AEl, Manual Focus

Exposure/metering
- Metering modes: Evaluative, Center-weighted average, Spot

Flash
- Flash: 50 cm – 7 m (wide), 90 cm – 2.3 m (tele)

Shutter
- Shutter: Mechanical and electronic shutter
- Shutter speed range: 1/2000 – 1 sec. (Auto mode), 1/2000 to 15 sec.
- Continuous shooting: Approx. 2.3 frame/s 9.6 frame/s in High-speed Burst HQ mode

Image processing
- White balance: Auto, Daylight, Cloudy, Tungsten, Fluorescent, Fluorescent H, Flash, Underwater, Custom

General
- LCD screen: 3.0-inch (76 mm) TFT color LCD, approx. 461,000 dots
- Battery: Canon NB-5L Li-Ion
- Optional battery packs: AC Adapter Kit ACK-DC30
- Dimensions: 98.8×59.0×26.9 mm (3.89×2.32×1.06 in) (W * H * D)
- Weight: 173 g (6.1 oz) excluding battery
- Made in: Japan

The Canon PowerShot S110 is a high-end 12.1-megapixel compact digital camera announced and released in 2012. It was designed as the successor to the Canon PowerShot S100 in the S series of the Canon PowerShot line of cameras.

The S110 is very similar to the S100, with the addition of a multi-touch capacitive touchscreen and the omission of a GPS receiver in favor of a Wi-Fi transmitter being the biggest change.

== Features ==
- 12.1 megapixels
- JPEG (Exif 2.3) support
- Raw image file format; one of few "point and shoot" cameras to have raw formatting. (Note: Raw format is not available in Auto, Low Light, and SCN modes. Raw is available in Program, Tv (shutter priority), Av (aperture priority), Manual, and Custom modes)
- MOV (QuickTime) (image data compressed in H.264, audio data in stereo Linear PCM).
- iFrame (1280×720, 30FPS)
- ISO sensitivity 80–12800 (in 1/3-step increments) and auto (up to ISO 1600).
- Full manual control
- Customizable Control Ring to control ISO, shutter speed, aperture, focus, or exposure compensation
- Five photo aspect ratios: 16:9, 3:2, 4:3, 1:1, 4:5
- Video features
  - Recording Standard, Color Accent, Color Swap: 1920 × 1080 (24 frame/s), 1280 × 720 (30 frame/s), 640 × 480 (30)
  - Recording Miniature Effect: 1280 × 720 (6 / 3 / 1.5 frame/s), 640 × 480 (6 / 3 / 1.5 frame/s)
  - Recording Super Slow Motion: 640 × 480 (120 frame/s), 320 × 240 (240 frame/s)
- Continuous shooting, P mode continuous shooting: ~2.3 shot/s. High-speed burst mode in HQ continuous shooting: ~9.6 shot/s.
- Multi-touch capacitive touchscreen
- Internet connectivity using Wi-Fi

Preceded by S100	Canon Powershot Compact S series September 2012 - August 2013	Succeeded by S120
