= Canon PowerShot SX50 HS =

Digital camera model

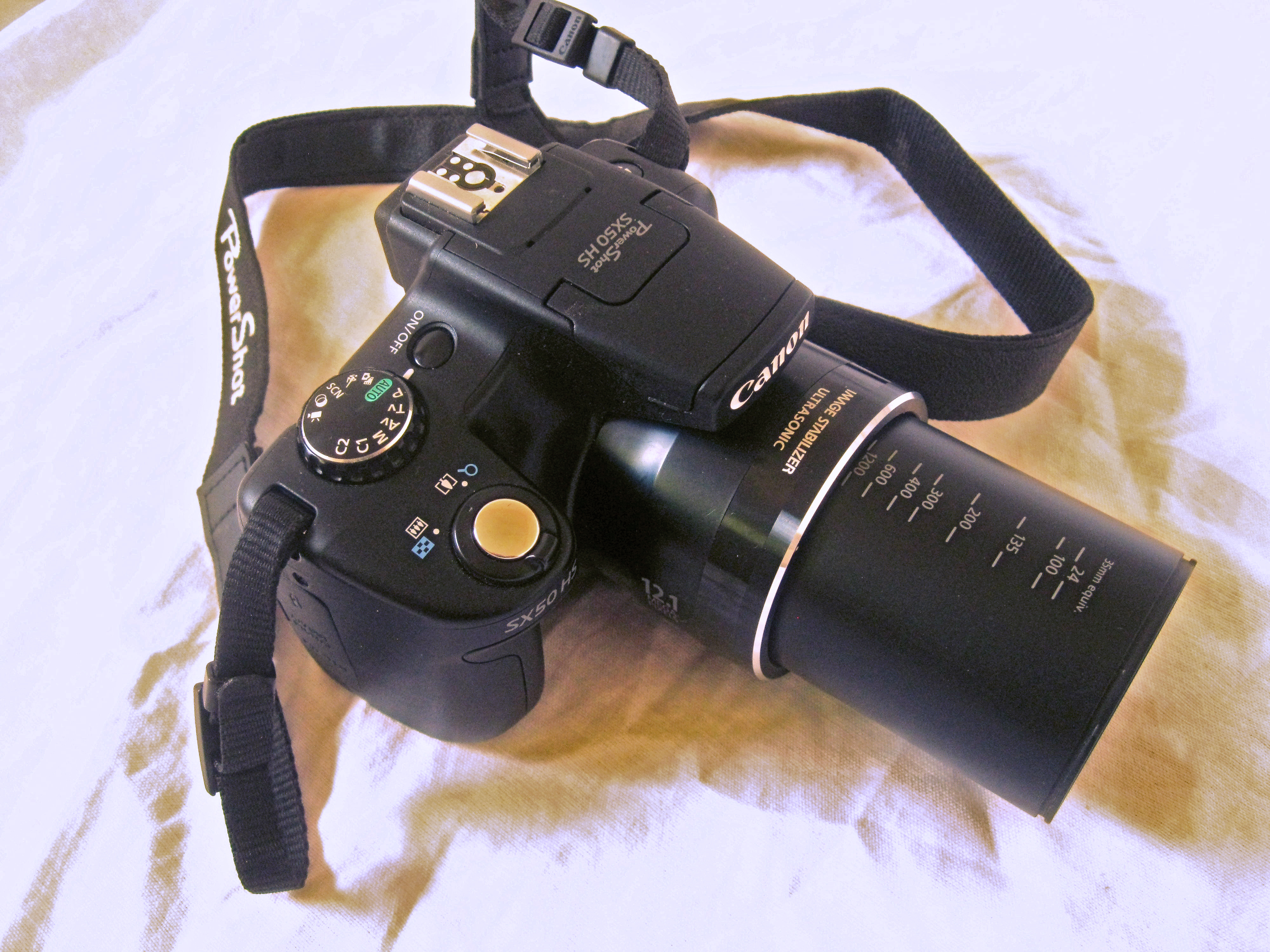
- Canon PowerShot SX50 HS

Overview
- Maker: Canon
- Type: PowerShot
- Released: October 2012
- Intro price: ~$600 (New)

Lens
- Lens: Built-in 50× zoom

Sensor/medium
- Sensor: (1/2.3" CMOS)
- Maximum resolution: 4000 × 3000 12.1 Megapixel
- Film speed: 80 to 6,400
- Recording medium: SD card

Focusing
- Focus: Auto

Flash
- Flash: Built in flash

Shutter
- Frame rate: 15-240 Fps
- Shutter speed range: 1/2,000 to 15 seconds
- Continuous shooting: 13.0 frames/sec

Viewfinder
- Viewfinder magnification: 50× Optical, 200× Digital.

General
- Video recording: Capable of recording 1920x1080 video at up to 30fps, slow motion of 240 fps.
- LCD screen: 2.8 inches (71 mm), 461,000 px
- Battery: NB-10L
- Weight: 551 g (19 oz) (1.215 lb)
- Made in: Japan

The Canon PowerShot SX50 HS is a 12.1 megapixel PowerShot model camera made by Canon. It features a large built-in 50× zoom lens which is equivalent to a focal length of 24-1200mm. Succeeding the Canon PowerShot SX40 HS, it was announced in October 2012. It was succeeded by the Canon PowerShot SX60 HS in September 2014.

== Compared to SX40 and SX70 ==
Type	PowerShot SX40 HS	PowerShot SX50 HS	PowerShot SX60 HS	PowerShot SX70 HS
Pixels	12.1 MP	12.1 MP	16.1 MP	20 MP
Focal range	(35X) 24 - 840 mm	(50X) 24 - 1200 mm	(65X) 21 - 1365 mm	(65X) 21 - 1365 mm
Aperture range	f/2.7 - f/5.8	f/3.4 - f/6.5	f/3.4 - f/6.5	f/3.4 - f/6.5
ISO range	100 - 3200	80 - 6400	100-6400	100 - 3200
LCD size	2.7	2.8	3.0	3.0
Weight	557 g	551 g	649 g	608g
Connectivity			Built-in Wireless	Built-in Wireless

== Sample photos ==
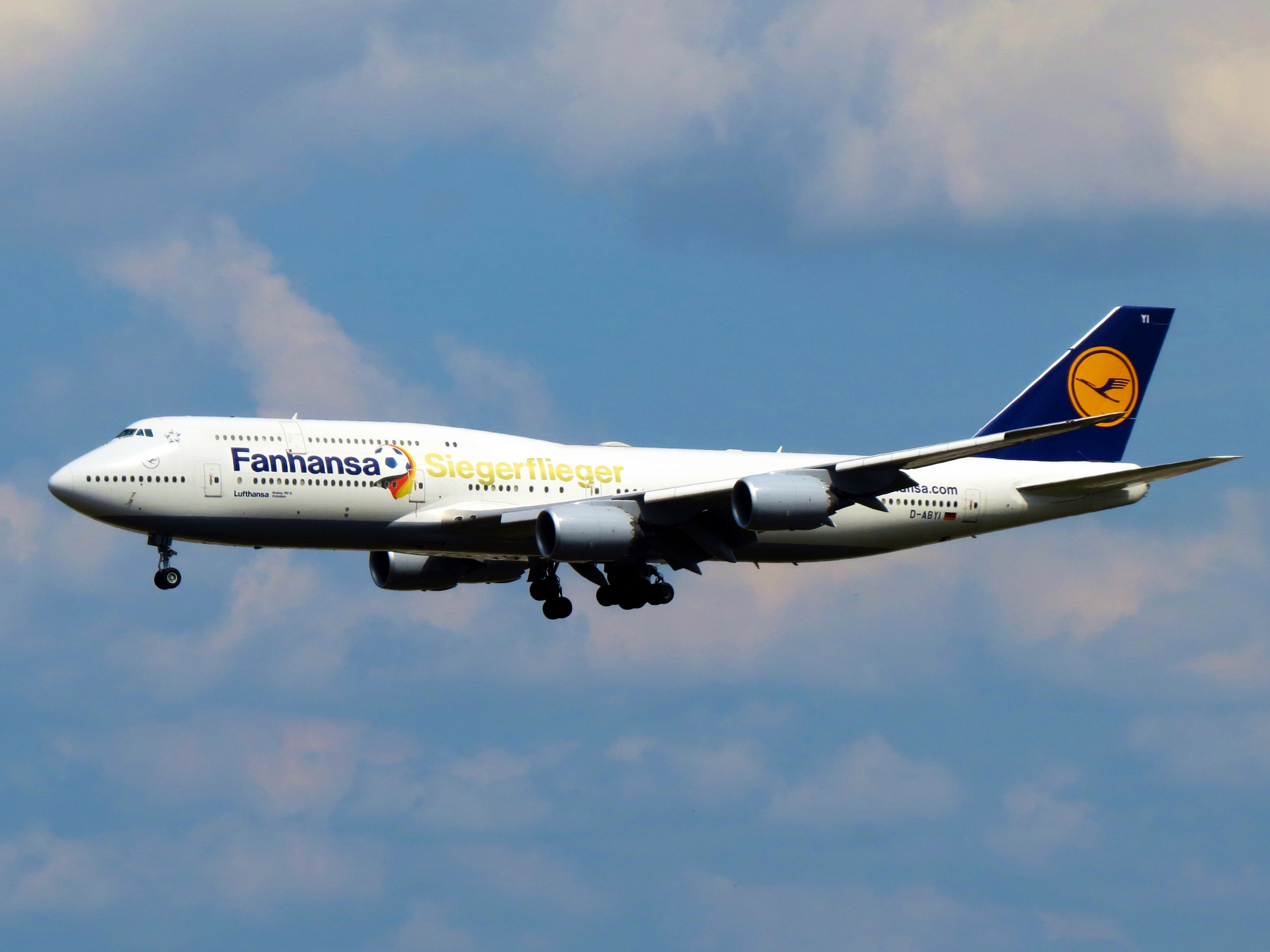
Boeing 747-830

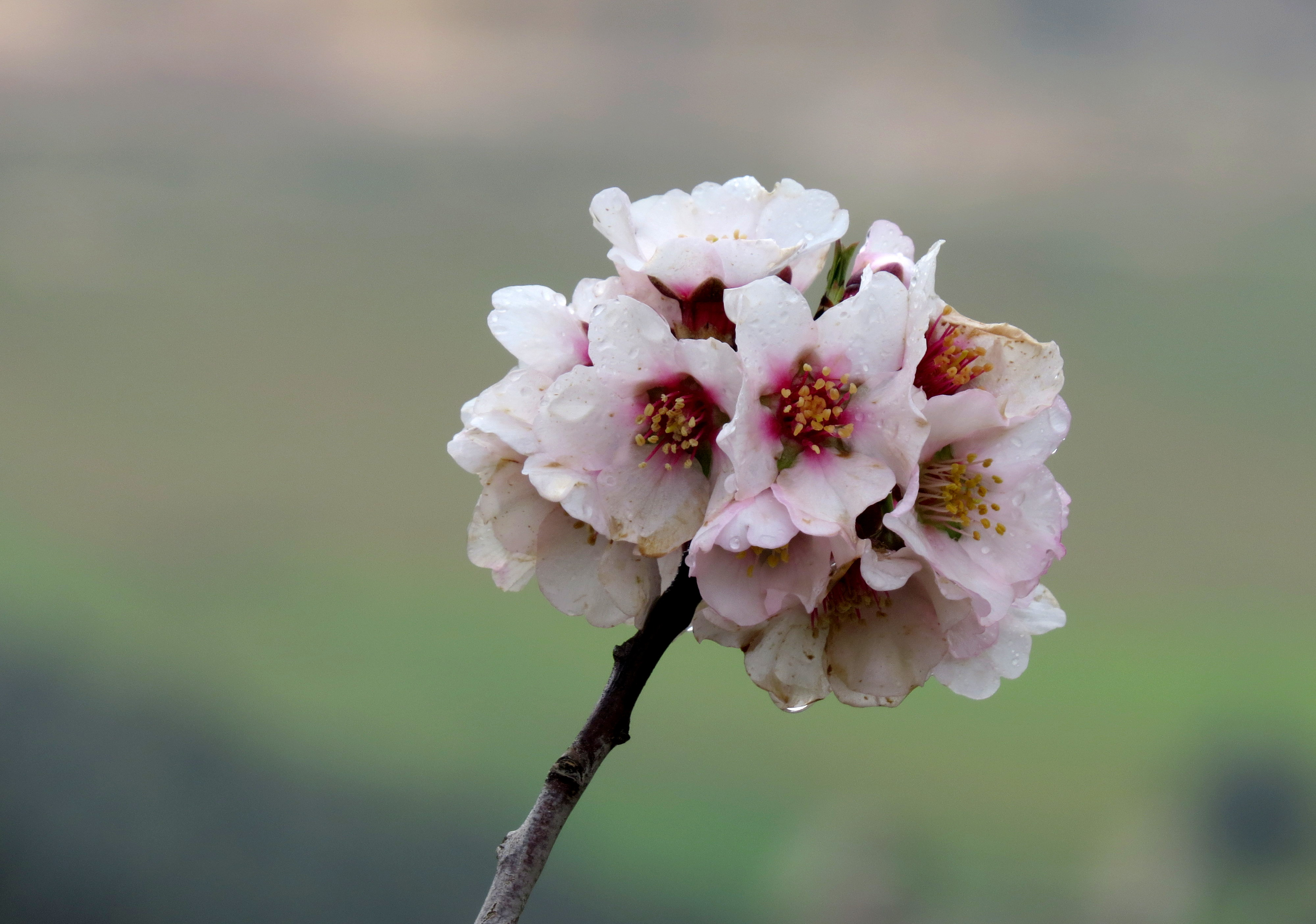
Almond blossoms

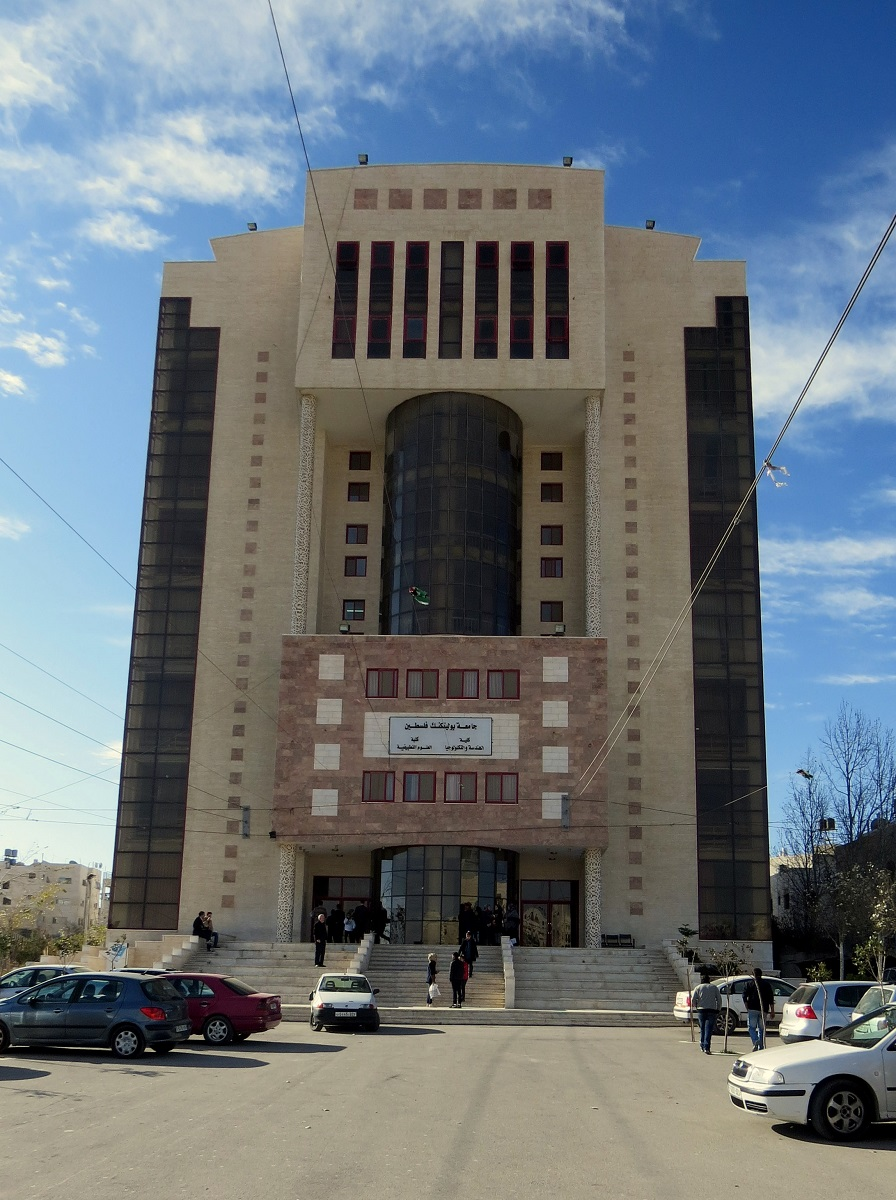
Palestine Polytechnic University

Little Owl

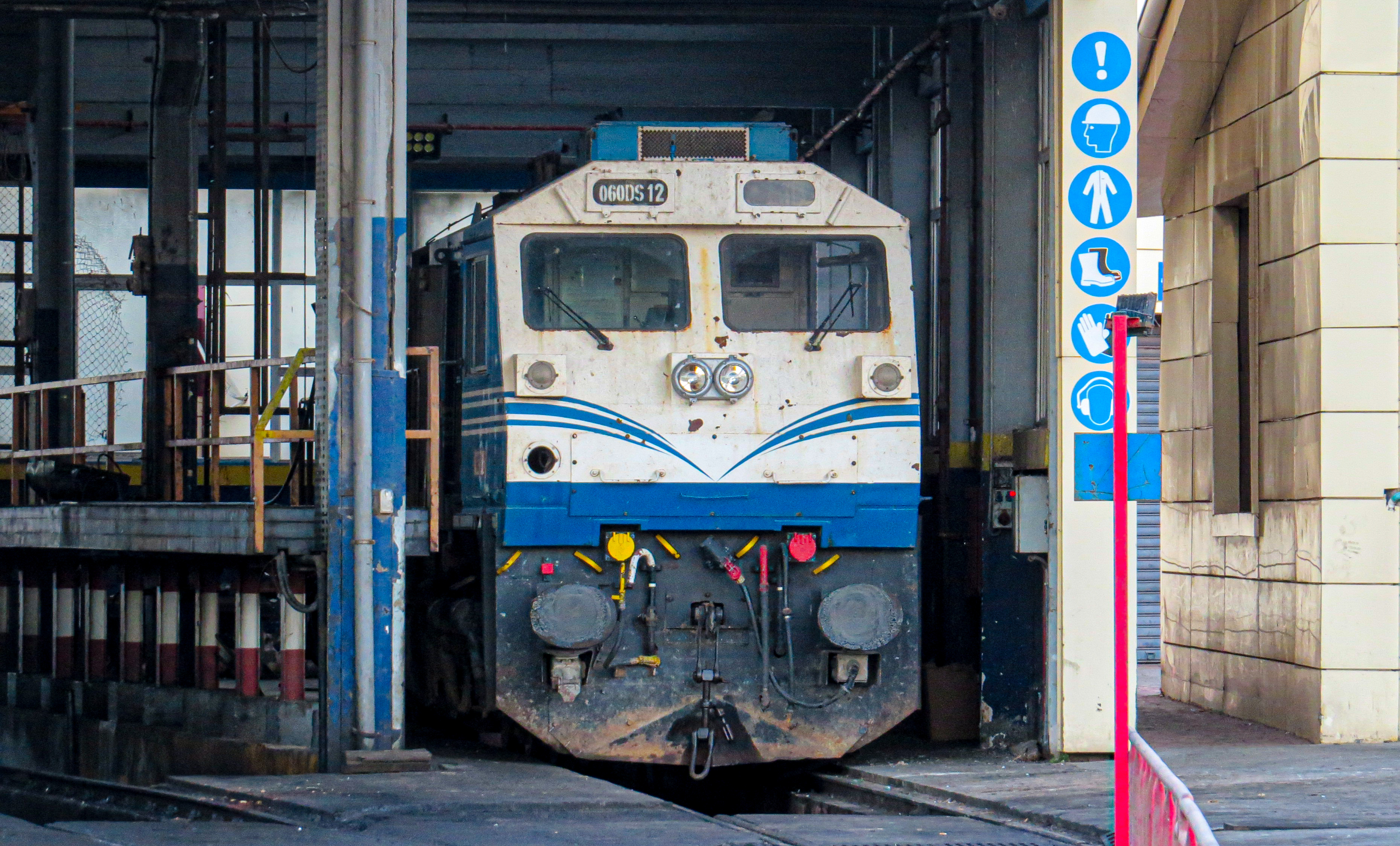
SNTF Class 060 DS (GT36 HCW)
