= Fujifilm FinePix HS10 =

FinePix HS10
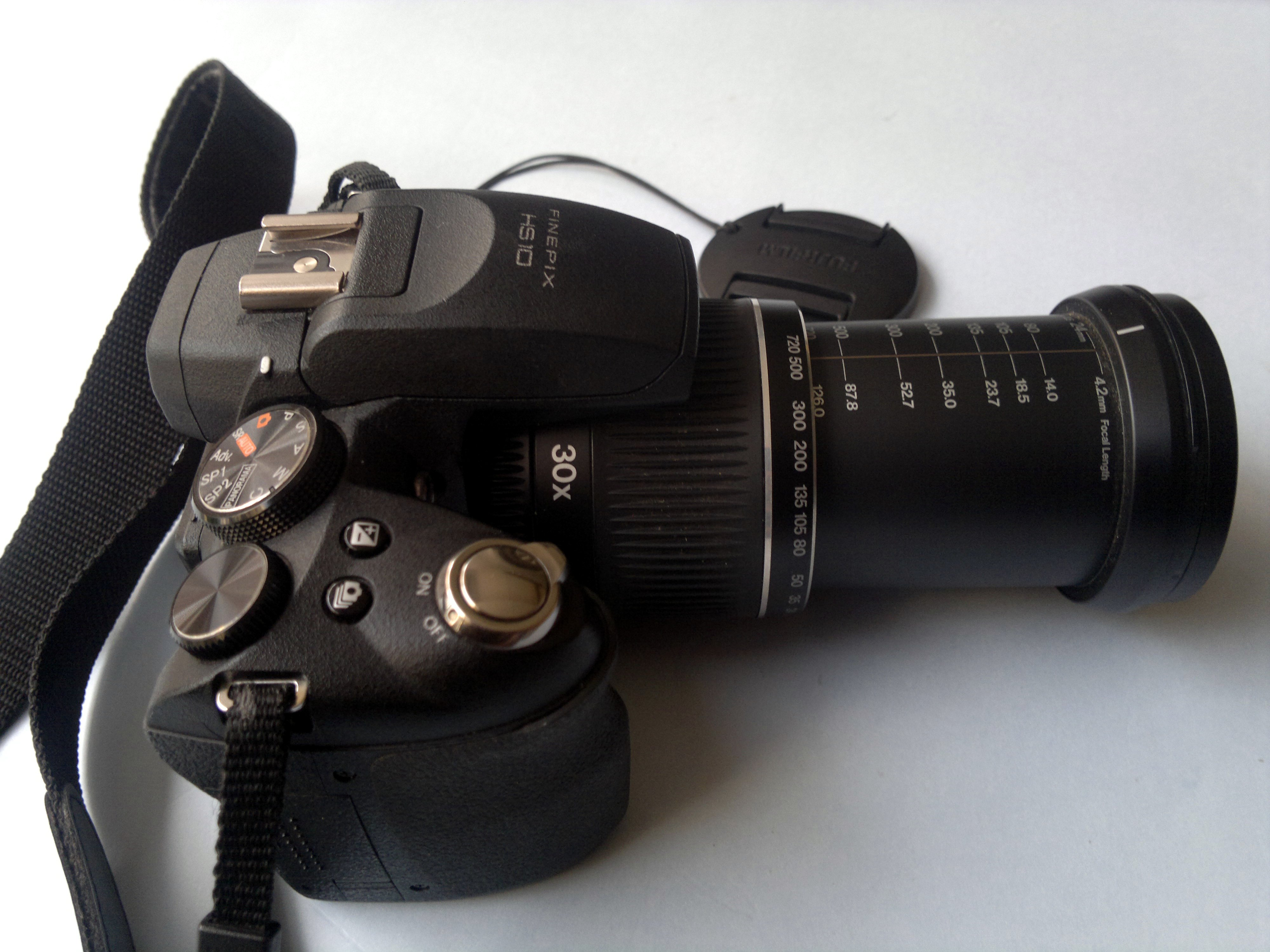
- FinePix HS10

Overview
- Maker: Fujifilm
- Type: bridge camera

Lens
- Lens: Fixed Fujinon 30x optical zoom lens, manually actuated (no motor delay), f=4.2–126.0 mm, equivalent to 24–720 mm on a 35 mm camera
- F-numbers: f/2.8–11 (wide) f/5.6–11 (long)

Sensor/medium
- Sensor type: BSI-CMOS – IR sensitive so there is a possibility to take infrared pictures (additional filter necessary)
- Sensor size: 10.3-megapixel 1/2.3-inch
- Maximum resolution: 3,648 × 2,736 (9.98 MP)
- Film speed: ISO 100 to 6400
- Recording medium: SD and SD HC cards plus internal (~46 MB)

Focusing
- Focus: Manual, autofocus

Flash
- Flash: Hot shoe, built-in

Shutter
- Frame rate: 10 frame/s
- Shutter speeds: 30 – 1/4000 s

Viewfinder
- Viewfinder: Electronic

General
- LCD screen: 240k pixel, tilts up and down, but not side to side
- Battery: 4 × AA
- Weight: 636 g (22 oz) (1.402 lb)

The Fujifilm FinePix HS10 (in some countries sold as Fujifilm FinePix HS11) is an ultrazoom bridge camera from Fujifilm that was announced in February 2010. It is the first model of the Fujifilm FinePix HS series.

== Features ==
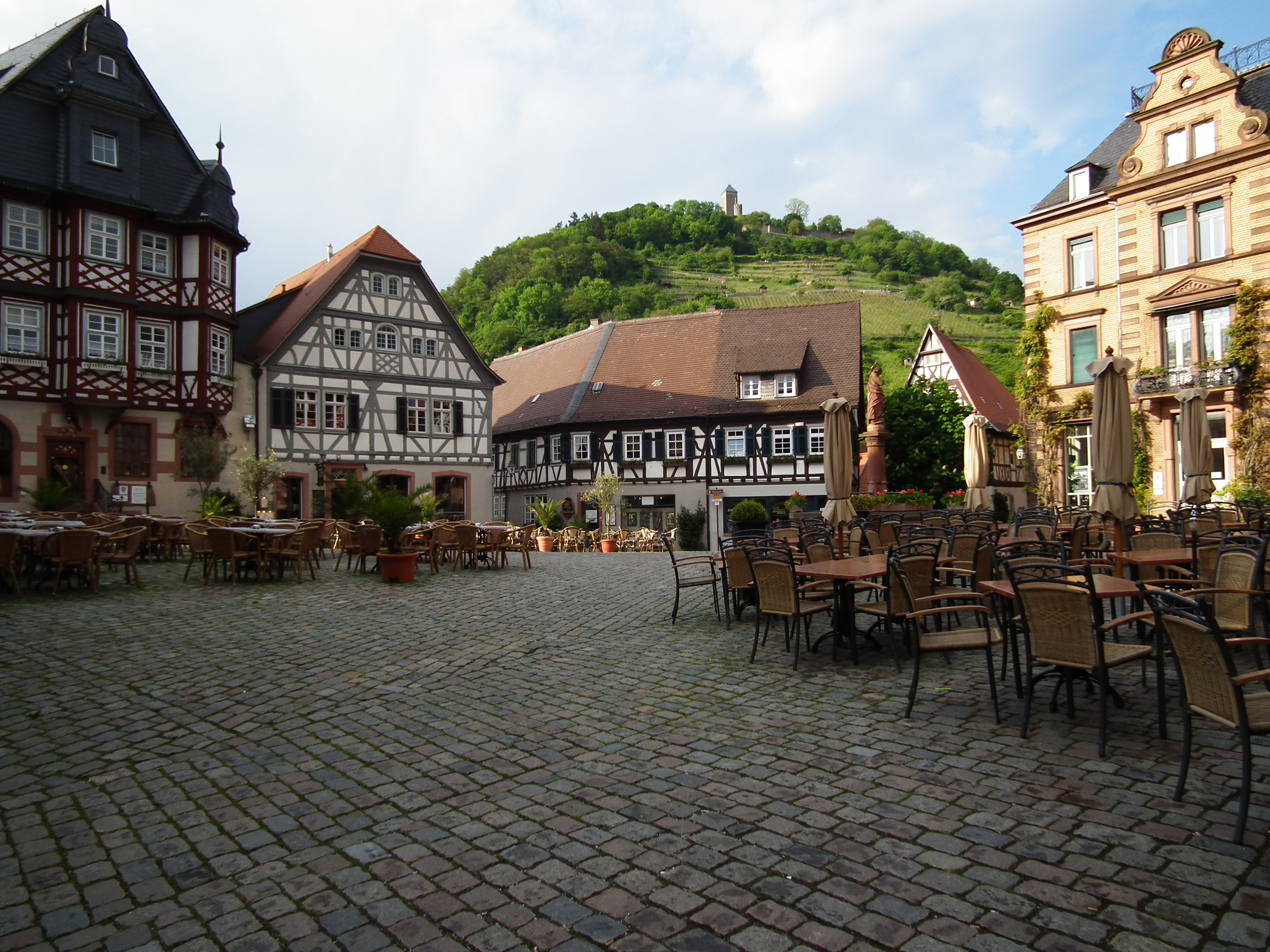
Full wide-angle (f=4.2 or 24 mm)

- Weight: 636 g (1.402 lb)
- Sensor: 10.3-megapixel 1/2.3-inch BSI-CMOS – maximum image resolution of 3,648 × 2,736
- Sensitivity: ISO 100 to 6400 (incl. automatic mode)
- Shutter speed: 30 – 1/4000 s (extremes depending on exposure mode)
- Fujinon 30x optical zoom lens, manually actuated (no motor delay), f/2.8 (Wide) – f/5.6 (Telephoto)
  - Focal length: f=4.2–126.0 mm, equivalent to 24–720 mm on a 35 mm camera
  - Aperture: f/2.8–11 (wide) f/5.6–11 (long)
  - Min Focus distance:
    - 50 cm (wide) – 3 m (Tele)
    - High speed 2 m (wide) – 5 m (Tele)
    - Macro 10 cm – 3 m (wide) – 2 m–5 m (Tele)
    - Super Macro 1 cm – 1 m
- Still images: RAW (.raf) size=px size of sensor(2,048×1,536 / 3 MP-this is shown in Windows Explorer, etc., in RAW converters it is shown real px size) or jpeg images (3,648×2,736 / 9.98 MP), and RAW+JPG. The raf file specifications differ from earlier versions of Fuji .raf files meaning that older software can not read HS10 raw files. For example, Adobe Photoshop versions prior to CS5 cannot read the new format. The Raw converter that comes with the camera does not save in TIF file format.
- HD Video up to 1080p at 30 frame/s with stereo audio recording. Duration limited to 29 minutes or 4 GB (which comes first).
- High speed video capture with frame rates from 60 frame/s up to 1,000 frame/s, sacrificing image resolution with increased frame rates. 60 frame/s at 1,280×720, 120 frame/s at 640×480, 240 frame/s at 442×332, 480 frame/s at 224×168, 1,000 frame/s at 224×64. No sound. Highspeed movie duration limited to 30 sec.

Ball drop in water

- Movie format: Apple QuickTime MOV. H264 video codec, stereo audio track recorded through two microphones.
- Audio: Mono Wav.
- Storage: SD and SD HC cards (max. 32 GB) plus internal (~46 MB).
- Power: 4×AA battery. Either Lithium (700 frames), Alkaline (300 frames) or Ni-MH (400 frames)
- Flash Built in plus hot shoe external
- Monitor 240k pixel, LCD up and down tilt. It does not tilt sideways.
- Exif: ver 2.2
- Exposure compensation: −2 to +2 EV at 1/3 intervals, in P, S, A, C modes. Compensation value not displayed.
- Exposure bracketing: ±1/3 to 1 EV in P, S, A, M and C modes.
- Connections: USB 2.0, mini HDMI, A/V (NTSC and PAL)
- Lens filter mount: 58 mm
- Sweep panoramas are taken in one long exposure. Moving objects can spoil it though.
- Dynamic range: Has three settings of DR100, DR200 and DR400.
- Continuous shooting modes:
  - Continuous 6 or 7 shots, with processing times from 10 to 30 seconds.
  - Best frame capture. Which captures continuously and records up to 6 frames previous to shutter release.
  - Zoom bracketing

== Zoom range comparison ==
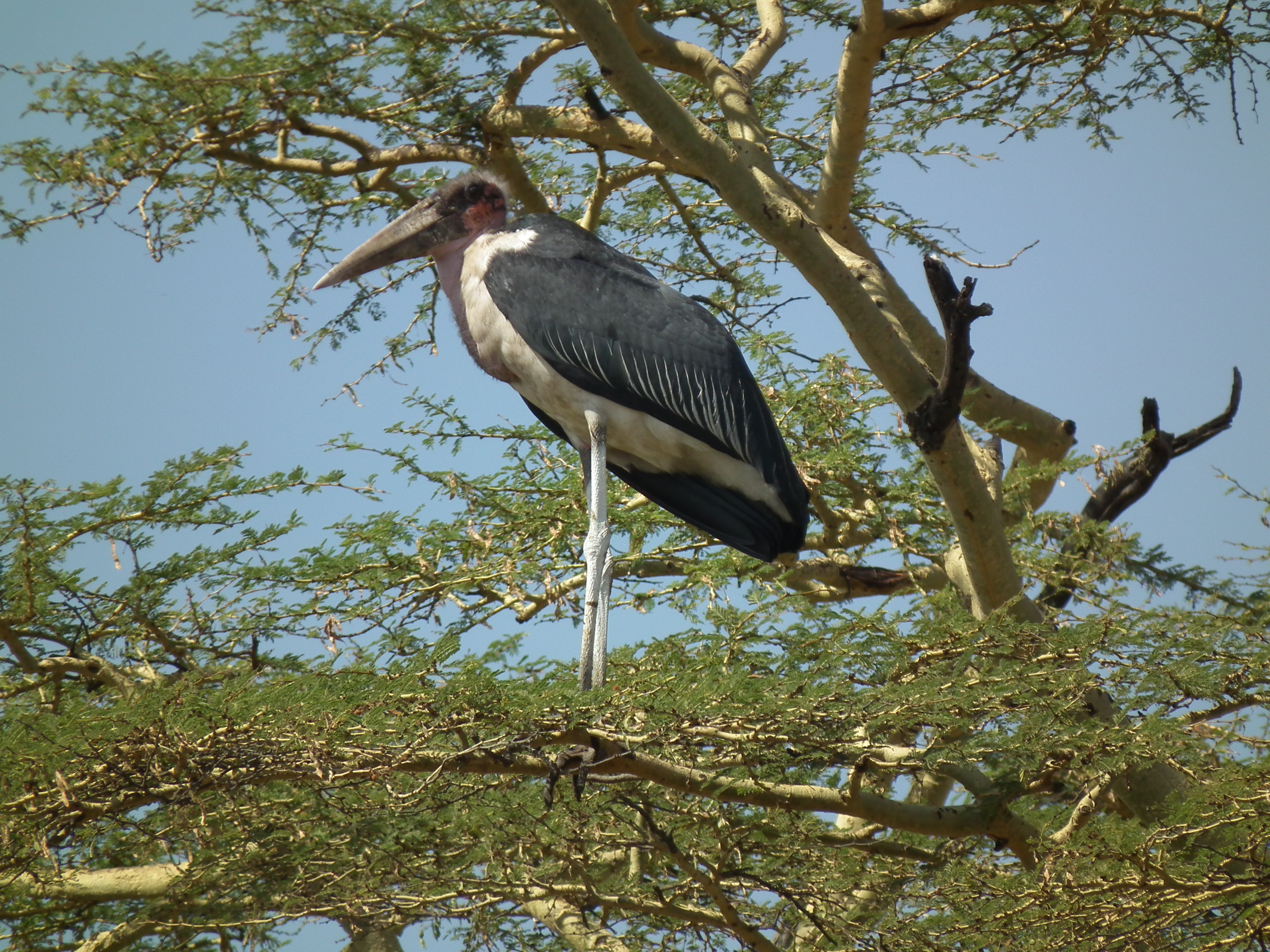
Photo taken at full zoom (f=126.0mm)

Up to now there are several bridge cameras have 30x optical zoom – the first one being FinePix HS10 and the second one Olympus SP-800-UZ. The digital zoom of Fujifilm FinePix HS10 is only 2x, whereas Olympus SP-800UZ has 5x. The others are Fujifilm FinePix HS20EXR and Sony Cyber-shot DSC-HX100V. Moreover, longer optical zoom right now is 35x by Canon PowerShot SX30 IS. and Nikon Coolpix P500 with 36x.

== See also ==
- Fujifilm FinePix HS
- Fujifilm FinePix S-series
- Digital photography
