= A400 =

A400 may refer to:

- A400 road (London)
- Airbus A400M Atlas, a military aircraft
- Canon Powershot A400, a Canon PowerShot A camera model
- Atari 400, one of the original models of Atari 8-bit computers
