= A540 =

A540 may refer to:

- Canon PowerShot A
- Quebec Autoroute 540 (disambiguation)
- A540 road

== See also ==
- Archimedes 540, abbreviated to A540 - one of the Acorn Archimedes range of RISC computers
