= Canon PowerShot TX1 =

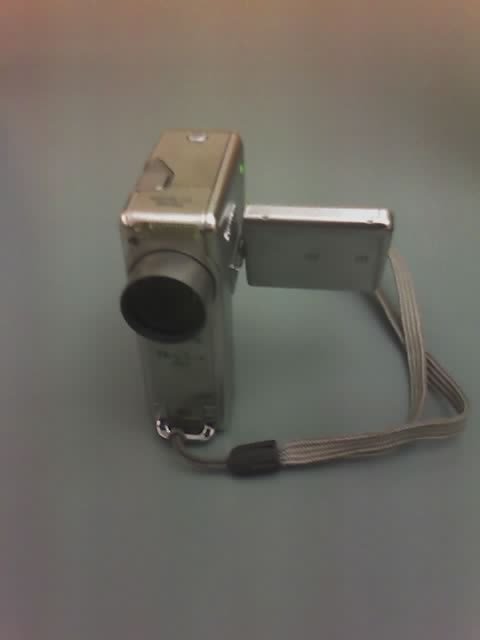

Overview
- Maker: Canon Inc.
- Type: Point-and-shoot

Lens
- Lens: Zoom lens

Sensor/medium
- Sensor: CCD
- Maximum resolution: 3,072 × 2,304 (7.1 megapixels)
- Film speed: ISO 80–1600

Shutter
- Shutter speed range: 1/2,500 to 15 sec.

General
- Weight: 220 g (7.8 oz)

The Canon PowerShot TX1 is a Canon digital camera. It was released on February 22, 2007 The TX1 is a hybrid device designed for both still imagery and video recording. It offers both HDTV (1280×720 pixel, 30 frame/s) movie capture, as well as 10× stabilized zoom and 7.1 megapixel sensor. It is designed to improve upon hybrid offerings by competitors such as the Sony Cyber-shot M1, Sony Cyber-shot M2, and Pentax MX4. It is oriented vertically and uses the camcorder-like swivel LCD viewing screen. Canon compares the hybrid camera's size to that of the Canon ELPH series of cameras. The company distinguishes the camera for its optical image stabilizer technology, DIGIC III image processor, face detection technology and red-eye effect correction with a mention of its built-in lens cover and scratch-resistant, anti-reflective LCD screen.

== Reviews ==
On its release it was termed the most expensive ultra zoom (10–12×) camera on the market. It is relatively small (8.9 cm (3.5 in) × 6 cm (2.4 in) × 2.9 cm (1.1 in)) and as a hybrid camera it includes a combination of features that was a fairly revolutionary for digital photography at the time of release. Although most digital cameras now offer both still image and video capabilities, few offer advanced levels of both such as ultra zoom and HDTV. This was Canon's first attempt at such a hybrid. The combination has not been highly regarded by reviewers and editors, but users were highly satisfied with the combination. Due to its weak sales, there was no successor model.

== Headline features ==
The following are the most important features:

- Vertical design
- 1/2.5-inch 7.1 million pixel CCD
- Vari-angle LCD monitor (1.8-inch)
- 10× optical (39–390 mm equiv.) zoom lens — 12 elements (one UD and one aspheric element)
- Optical image stabilization
- ISO 80–1600
- DIGIC III and face detection
- 720p (1280×720) movies at 30 frame/s with stereo sound
- 1080i component video output
- Flexible movie/still shooting. Shoot a full-resolution still image during movie recording, or start movie recording by pressing the record button

== New features ==
The following are considered new features:

- Vertical design
- Vari-angle LCD monitor
- Lens totally hidden when power off
- Wide-range, compact zoom
- Image stabilization
- 7.1 million pixel CCD sensor
- Auto ISO shift
- Selectable aspect ratio
- Auto red eye correction
- Digic III processor
- Windows Vista OS compatibility
- Expanded SD card compatibility
- Wide-screen setting
- Flexible movie, still shooting
- Continuous recording up to 4 GB
- Continuous audio-only recording
- "Component" output to HDTVs
- Face detection system
- Shutter speed/aperture read-out
- Read-out of ISO
- Digital tele-converter
- Safety zoom
- Time lapse movie feature
- AC adapter kit ACK-DC10
- High-power flash HF-DC1
