= Canon PowerShot D =

Digital camera series

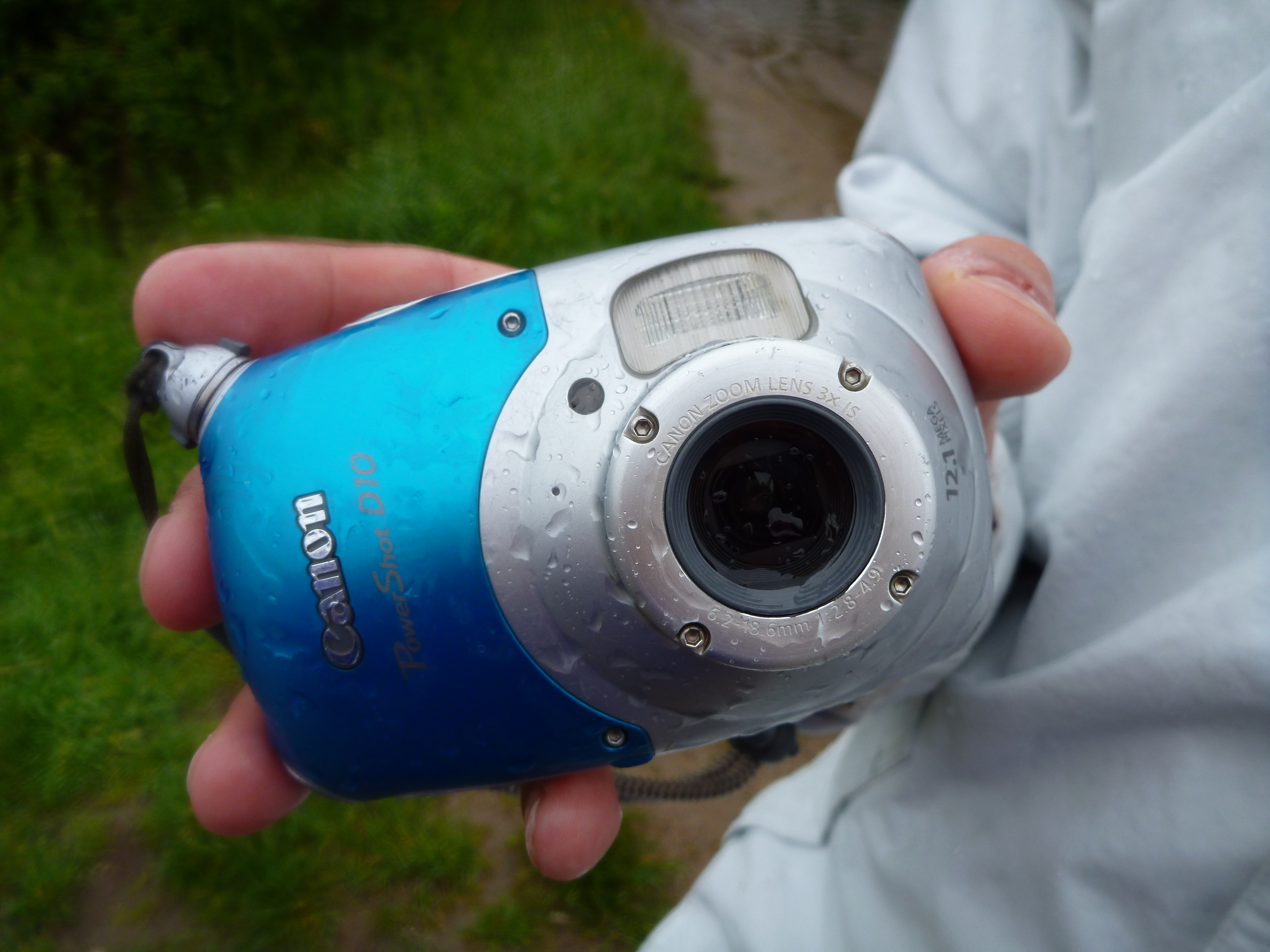
PowerShot D10

The Canon PowerShot D is a series of digital cameras released by Canon in 2009.

The D series cameras are designed for underwater and heavy-duty use.

Releases of D series:

- D30 (announced Feb 12, 2014) is waterproof up to 25 m (82 ft) it was the world's deepest camera without housing, temperature −10 °C to 40°C, shock-resistant up to 2 meters, dust proof, effective pixel 12.1-megapixel CMOS, ISO up to 3200, optical zoom 5×, zoom (eq. 35mm) 28–140mm, digital zoom 4*, 1024p Full HD video with dedicated button, 640 * 480 or 320 * 240 (120, 240 fps), miniature effect: 1920 * 1080 or 1280 * 720 (1.5, 3, 6 fps), Sunlight LCD for better view in bright condition, built-in flash, size: 109 × 68 × 28 mm, weight 218 grams, built-in GPS tracker.
- D20 (announced Feb 7, 2012) is waterproof up to 10 m (33 ft), temperature −10 °C, shock-resistant, effective pixel 12.1-megapixel CMOS, ISO up to 3600, zoom mechanical 5×, zoom (35mm) 28–140mm, size: 112 × 71 × 28 mm, weight 228 grams, built-in GPS.
- D10 (announced Feb 18, 2009) is waterproof to 10 m (33 ft), and freeze- and shock-resistant. Because the waterproof case limits lens size, the D10 has a 3× optical zoom lens; resolution is 12.1 MP.

Model	Release date	Sensor specifications	Video specification	Lens (35mm equiv.), zoom and aperture	Image Processor	LCD specification	Memory Card	Size W×H×D (mm)	Weight (g)	Notes
D10	18 February 2009	12.1MP 4000 x 3000 1/2.3" CCD	640x480 30fps	35 - 105mm (3x) f/2.8-4.9	DIGIC 4	2.5" Fixed 230,000	SD, SDHC, MMC, MMC, HC MMC	104 x 67 x 49	190g	First of the series
D20	7 February 2012	12.1MP 4000 x 3000 1/2.3" CMOS	1080p 24fps 720p 30fps 640x480 120fps 320x240 240fps	28 - 140mm (5x) f/3.9-4.8	DIGIC 4	3" Fixed 461,000	SD, SDHC, MMC, MMC, HC MMC	112 x 70 x 28	228g	added GPS
D30	12 February 2014	12.1MP 4000 x 3000 1/2.3" CMOS	1080p 24fps 720p 30fps 640x480 120fps 320x240 240fps	28 - 140mm (5x) f/3.9-4.8	DIGIC 4	3" Fixed 461,000	SD, SDHC, MMC, MMC, HC MMC	109 x 68 x 28	218g	

== See also ==
- Canon PowerShot
