= Fujifilm FinePix HS =

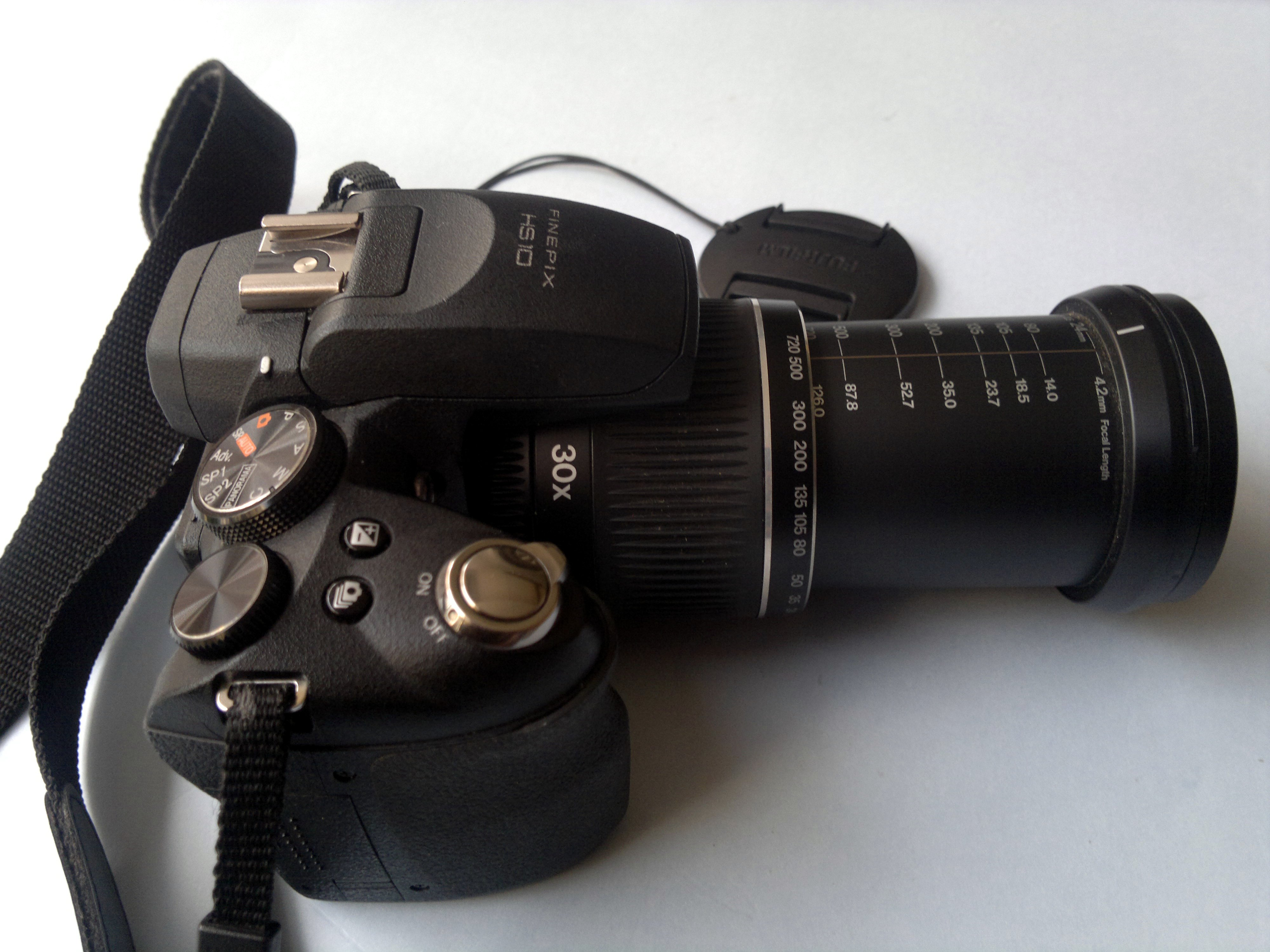
HS10 in full tele position

The Fujifilm FinePix HS is a series of bridge cameras that started in February 2010 with the HS10 model (also called HS11). The special feature of the HS cameras is the manual zoom that - otherwise common only with system cameras - allows a quick and precise change of the focal length but demands two-handed operation.

== Common features ==
All Fuji HS models have these properties in common:

- CMOS back-lit sensor, EXR from HS20 on
- Raw file format
- Electronic viewfinder (resolution 200k at first, later 900k pixels)
- 3" tiltable LCD screen (tilt and swivel for HS50)
- Maximum ISO setting of 12,800
- High-definition video

== Generations and models ==
=== HS10 ===
The first model in this series features a 10.3 megapixel sensor and 24–720 mm equivalent focal length lens at a maximum aperture of f/2.8 to f/5.6. It is the only model in the series so far to not have an EXR colour filter.

=== HS20 ===
The HS10's 10 Mpix sensor was upgraded to a 16 Mpix EXR sensor and a higher resolution screen - 460k compared to 230k - in January 2011 in the HS20 model.

=== HS25, HS30, HS33, HS35 ===
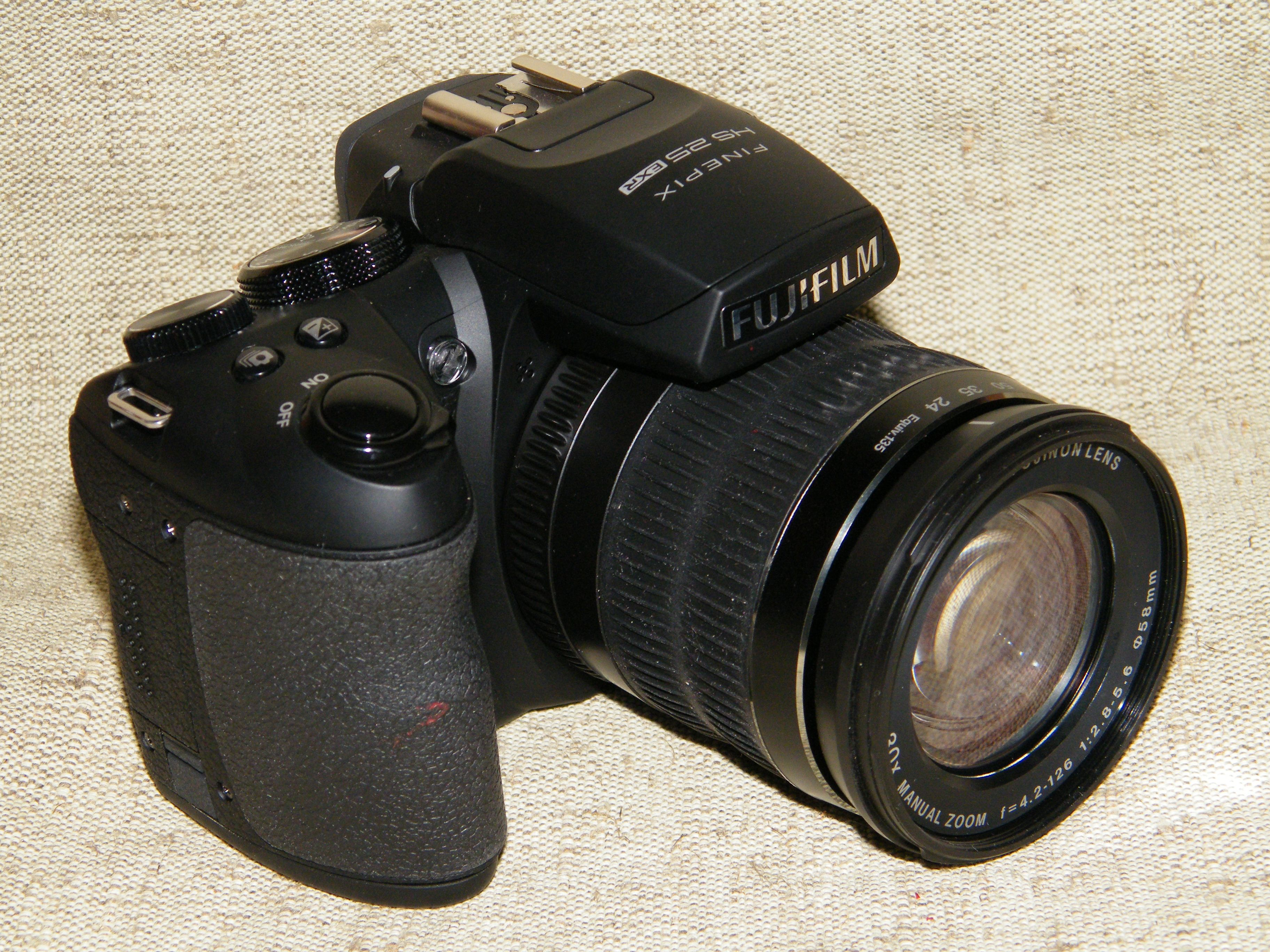
Fujifilm FinePix HS25EXR

The FinePix HS30EXR was introduced in January 2012 as the third model in the HS range. The HS30 and HS25 feature a redesigned 16MP back-lit CMOS sensor and gain a series of improvements over the previous HS20 model, such as manual focusing during video capture and more scene modes.

The HS25EXR is identical to the HS30EXR except that it does not offer RAW support and uses AA / NiMh batteries compared to the Lithium battery of the HS30. HS25 has lower resolution electronic viewfinder.

The HS35 was announced in 2013, together with the HS50. The HS35 is cheaper model of HS30 with almost identical features and appearance as the HS30. The differences are, the HS35 can take ISO 6400 and 12800 without boost, but lack of flash modes (no Auto, On, Off, Red-eye, Slow Sync), lack of White balance presets, and no charger.

=== HS50, HS55 ===
The current (2013) HS50 model represents the fourth generation. Added features are a new EXR CMOS II sensor, a faster hybrid contrast-and-phase-detection autofocus, faster video (HD 60p) and burst speeds and a new 24–1000 mm equivalent zoom with lens-shift stabilizer. The screen now has 920k resolution and is variable-angle.

Photographic functions comprise:

- PASM and custom exposure modes
- EXR mode (dynamic range/high resolution)
- Face Detection, Auto Red-eye removal
- Advanced modes: Pro focus, Pro low light, Multiple exposure
- Motion Panorama 360, Film simulation
- Advanced filter: Toy Camera / Miniature / POP COLOR / High-Key / Low-Key / Dynamic Tone / Partial Color / Soft Focus

Video:

- Resolution HD 1920 x 1080 or 1280 x 720 pixels at 60 frames/s, or VGA
- High Speed Movie (120 / 240 / 480 frames/sec.)
- Microphone-level adjustment, external microphone input

Supportive functions:

- Electronic level, Histogram display
- Focus check, Focus peaking in Manual focus mode
- Framing guideline, best frame capture

== See also ==
- Fujifilm FinePix
- Fujifilm cameras
- Fujifilm
