= Canon PowerShot =

Digital camera product line

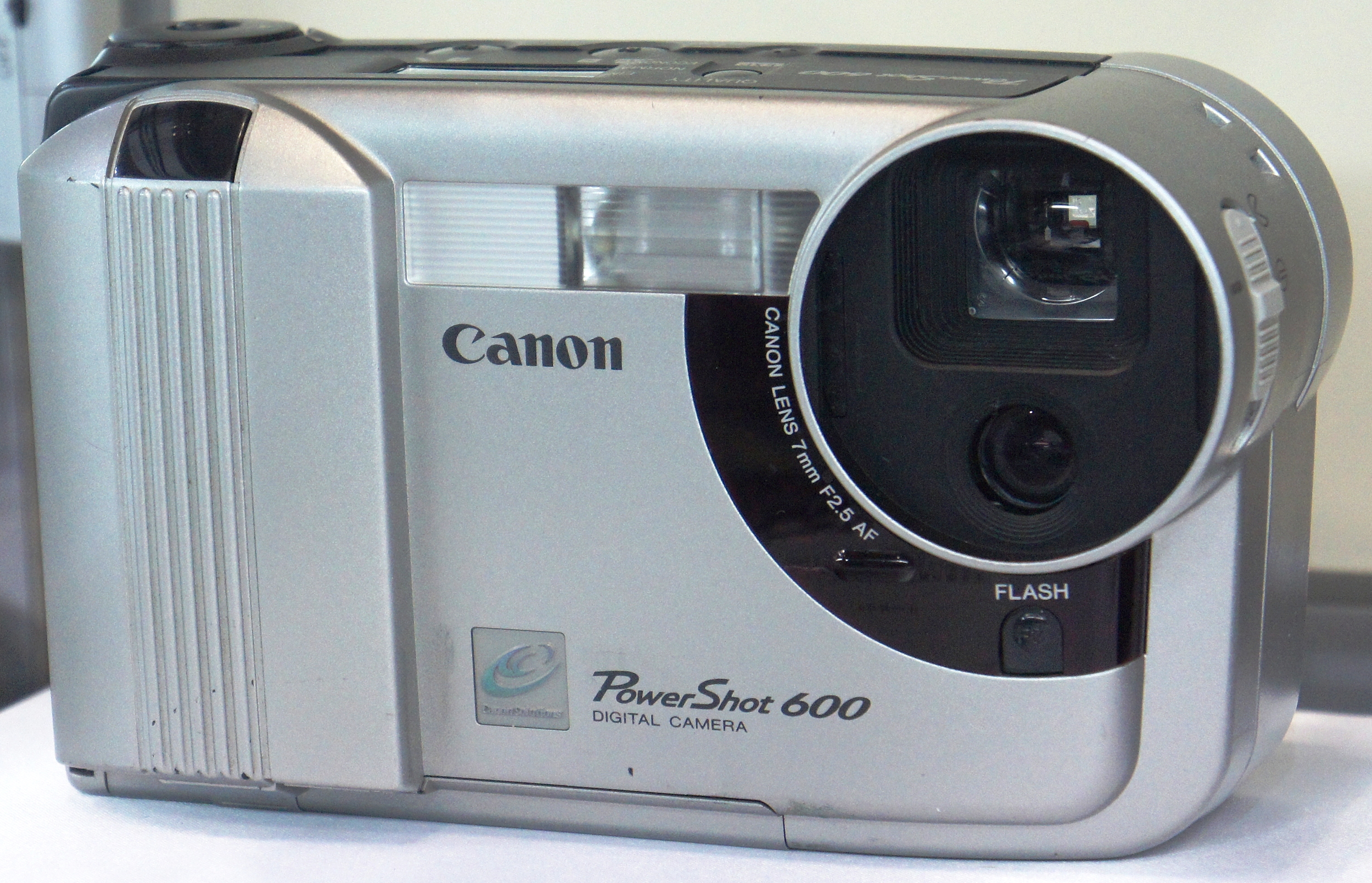
Canon PowerShot 600, Canon's first consumer digital camera, released in 1996 featuring 0.5 Mpixel CCD

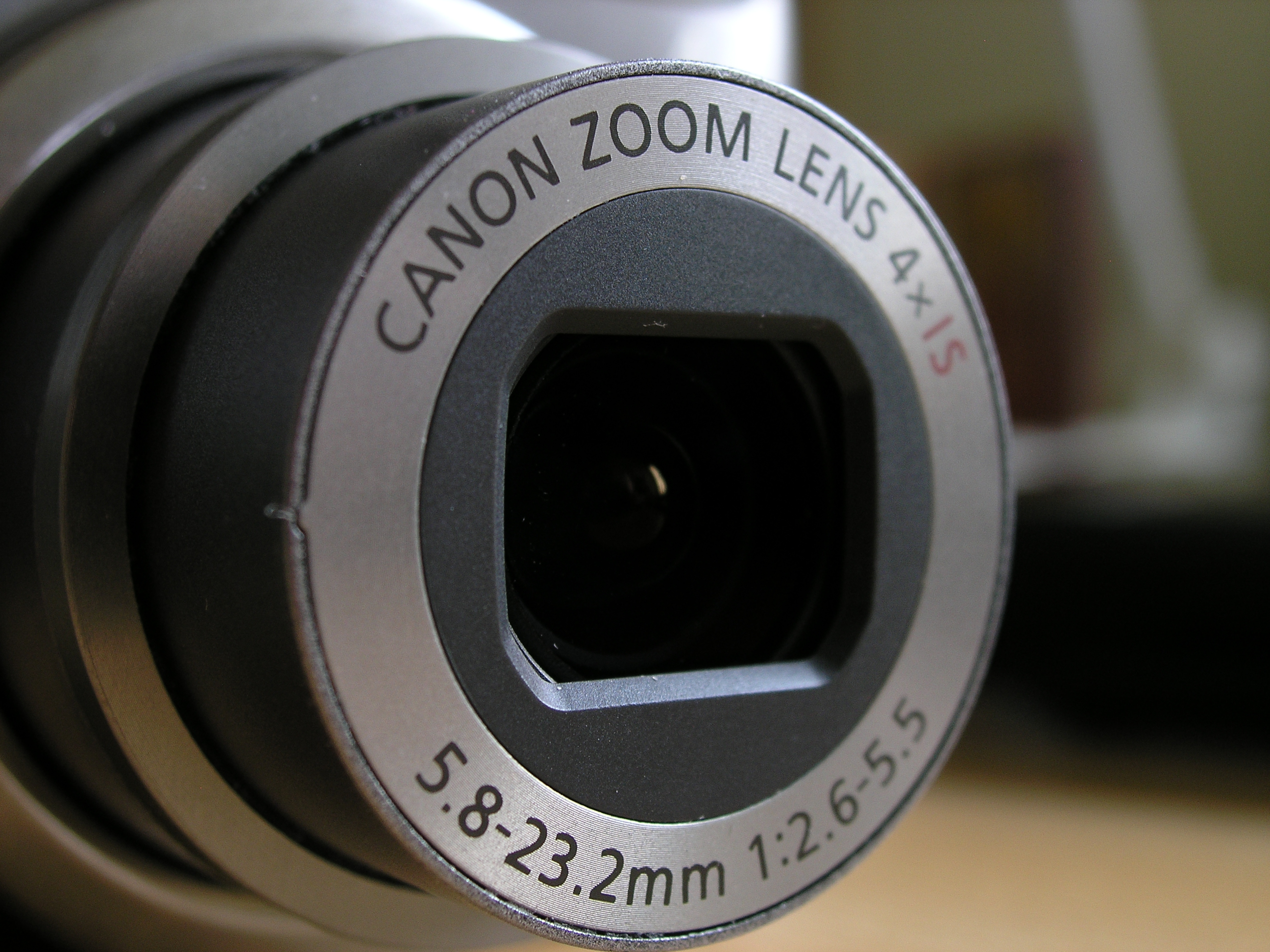
Canon PowerShot A590 lens

PowerShot is a line of consumer and prosumer grade digital cameras, launched by Canon in 1996. The first model, the PowerShot 600, came shortly after Canon released and subsequently discontinued its SV series in 1992, marking the move to digital cameras. The PowerShot line has been successful for Canon, and is one of the best-selling digital camera lines worldwide. The PowerShot was sold to the general public as a compact and easy-to-use digital camera.

Free software from the Canon Hack Development Kit (CHDK) project allows nearly complete programmatic control of PowerShot cameras, enabling users to add features, up to and including BASIC and Lua scripting.

In 2005, certain models of PowerShot A-series and S-series cameras were affected by third-party CCD sensors with a design flaw, which caused them to fail and display severely distorted images. Canon offered to repair affected cameras free of charge.

== Products ==
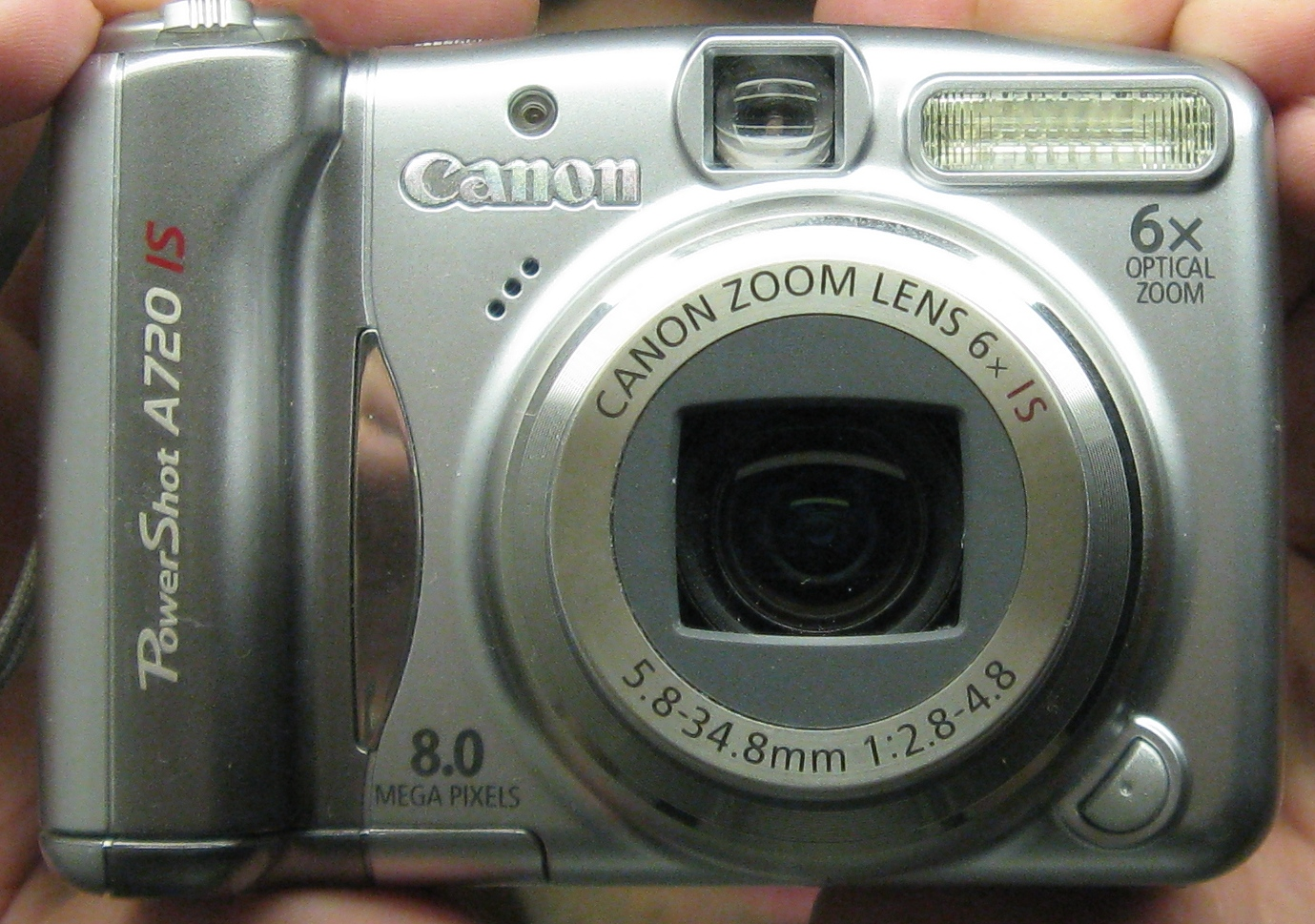
Front view of Canon PowerShot A720 IS.

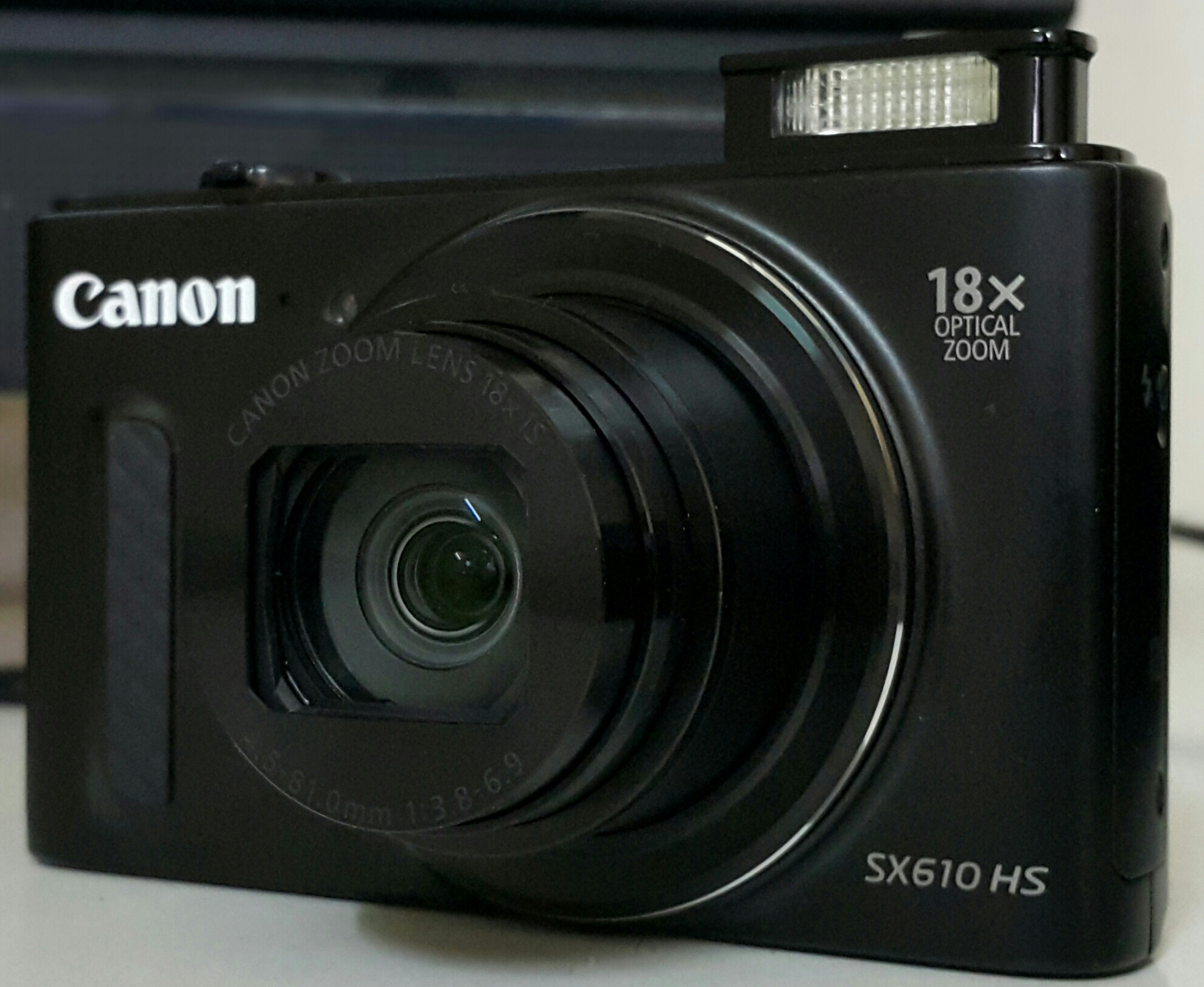
A black Canon PowerShot SX610 HS.

Current

- D series: outdoor cameras with waterproof, freeze-resistant, and shock-resistant bodies
- E series: design-oriented budget cameras
- G series: flagship cameras with advanced features
- S/SD series (also known as PowerShot Digital ELPH, Digital IXUS, and IXY Digital): "Performance and Style" ultra-compact point-and-shoot cameras
- S/SX series: ultra-zoom cameras
- V series: vlogging cameras

("IS" and "HS" are not a series; they are suffixes that denote "image stabilization" and "high sensitivity" respectively.)

Discontinued

- PowerShot 600 (1996)
- S series: originally a series of compact point-and-shoot cameras, currently a series of prosumer cameras slotting beneath the G series
- A series: "Easy and Fun" budget cameras ranging from point-and-shoot to prosumer cameras
- Pro series: semi-professional-level cameras slotting right beneath Canon's dSLRs, consisting of the Pro70 (1998), Pro90 IS (2001), and Pro1 (2004)
- TX series: hybrid camera–camcorders

Model	Release date	Sensor specifications	Video specifications	Lens (35 mm equiv), zoom and aperture	Image processor	LCD specifications	Viewfinder	Card	Size W×H×D (mm)	Weight (with batteries)	Notes
PowerShot 600	13 June 1996	1 MP (832×608), 1/3" CCD	No video mode	50 mm, f/2.5		No LCD	Optical	PCMCIA Type II / III (1 MB internal memory)	160 × 93 × 59	460 g	Canon's first consumer digital camera, has RAW
Pro 70	Early 1999	1.68 MP (1536×1024), 1/2" CCD (CYGM)	No video mode	28–70 mm (2.5×), f/2–2.4		2" vari-angle	Optical	Compact Flash Type I / II (2 slots)	148 × 84 × 130	800 g	Added hotshoe
Pro 90 IS	February 2001	2.6 MP (1856×1392), 1/1.8" CCD (CYGM)	320×240 at 15 FPS	37–370 mm (10×), f/2.8–3.5		1.8" vari-angle	Electronic	Compact Flash Type I / II	125 × 85 × 130	680 g	Added video mode
Pro 1	February 2004	8 MP (3264×2448), 2/3" CCD	640×480 at 15 FPS	28–200 mm (7×), f/2.4–3.5	DIGIC	2" vari-angle, 235,000 dots	Electronic	Compact Flash Type I / II	118 × 72 × 90	640 g	Has built in ND Filter

== See also ==
- List of Canon products
