= Canon PowerShot A =

Series of digital cameras

The Canon PowerShot A is a discontinued series of digital cameras released by Canon. The A-series started as a budget line of cameras, although over time its feature set varied from low-end point-and-shoot cameras to high-end prosumer cameras capable of rivalling Canon's PowerShot G-series.

== Models ==
The series began with the A5, which was a very basic point-and-shoot camera line. The Axx series that followed offered full manual control (on most models) in a fairly bulky body. The A100/200/3xx/4xx series cameras are stripped-down with very little manual controls. The Axx series later branched off into the A5xx (replaced by the A1xxx series), A6xx, and A7xx series (the latter replaced by the A2xxx series). A-series cameras are generally powered by 2 AA batteries.

Model	Release date	Sensor resolution, size, type	Video recording	Lens (35 mm equiv) zoom, aperture	Image processor	LCD screen size, pixels	Memory	Size W×H×D (mm)	Weight (body, g)	Photo	Notes
A5 series
A5	April 1998	1 MP; 1024 × 768; 1/3" CCD	No movie mode	35 mm		2" fixed	CF	105 × 68 × 33	240		
A5 zoom	October 1998	1 MP; 1024 × 768; 1/3" CCD	No movie mode	28–70 mm (2.5×) f/2.6–4.0		2" fixed	CF	103 × 68 × 37	260		Zoom capability
A50	April 1999	1 MP; 1280 × 960; 1/2.7" CCD	No movie mode	28–70 mm (2.5×) f/2.6–4.0		2" fixed	CF	103 × 68 × 37	260		
Axx series
A10	May 2001	1.3 MP; 1/2.7"	No movie mode	35–105 mm (3×)		1.5" fixed	CF	110.3 × 71.0 × 37.6	250		All-new body design
A20	May 2001	2.0 MP; 1/2.7"	No movie mode	35–105 mm (3×)		1.5" fixed	CF	110.3 × 71.0 × 37.6	250		All-new body design
A30	March 2002	1.3 MP; 1/2.7"	320×240 20 fps	35–105 mm (3×)		1.5" fixed	CF	110.3 × 71.0 × 37.6	250		
A40	March 2002	2.0 MP; 1/2.7"	320×240 20 fps	35–105 mm (3×)		1.5" fixed	CF	110.3 × 71.0 × 37.6	250		Added microphone for movie with sound
A60	March 2003	2.0 MP; 1/2.7"	320×240 15 fps	35–105 mm (3×)	DIGIC	1.5" fixed	CF	101.0 × 64.0 × 31.5	215		Smaller and lighter. The Canon PowerShot A60 and A70 cameras were the first digital camera models in their class to feature aperture and shutter priority, and full manual modes.
A70	March 2003	3.2 MP; 1/2.7"	640×480 15 fps	35–105 mm (3×)	DIGIC	1.5" fixed	CF	101.0 × 64.0 × 31.5	215		Smaller and lighter. The Canon PowerShot A60 and A70 cameras were the first digital camera models in their class to feature aperture and shutter priority, and full manual modes.
A80	October 2003	4.0 MP; 1/1.8"	320×240 15 fps	38–114 mm (3×)	DIGIC	1.5" vari-angle	CF	103.1 × 64.4 × 34.7	250		Added vari-angle LCD
A75	March 2004	3.2 MP; 1/2.7"	640×480 15 fps	35–105 mm (3×) f/2.8–4.8	DIGIC	1.8" fixed	CF	101.0 × 64.0 × 31.5	200		Print/Share button, redesigned grip
A85	September 2004	4.0 MP; 1/2.7"	640×480 10 fps 320×240 15 fps	35–105 mm (3×) f/2.8–4.8	DIGIC	1.8" fixed	CF	101.0 × 64.0 × 31.5	200		Print/Share button, redesigned grip
A95	September 2004	5.0 MP; 1/1.8"	640×480 10 fps 320×240 15 fps	38–114 mm (3×)	DIGIC	1.8" vari-angle	CF	103.1 × 64.4 × 34.7	250		Update of A80
Model	Release date	Sensor resolution, size, type	Video recording	Lens (35 mm equiv) zoom, aperture	Image processor	LCD screen size, pixels	Memory	Size W×H×D (mm)	Weight (body, g)	Photo	Notes
A100/200/3xx/4xx Series
A100	April 2002	1.2 MP; 1280 × 960; 1/2.7"	320×240 15 fps	39 mm f/2.8		1.5"	CF	110 × 58 × 36.6	175		New low-end series with different body shape, no optical zoom,
A200	June 2002	2.0 MP; 1600 × 1200; 1/3.2"	320×240 20 fps	39 mm f/2.8		1.5"	CF	110 × 58 × 36.6	175		
A300	April 2003	3 2 MP; 2048 × 1536; 1/2.7"	640×480 15 fps	33 mm f/3.6	DIGIC	1.5"	CF	110 × 58 × 36.6	175		New sliding lens cover,
A310	March 2004	3 2 MP; 2048 × 1536; 1/2.7"	640×480 15 fps	33 mm f/3.6	DIGIC	1.5"	CF	110 × 58 × 36.6	175		Print/Share button,
A400	September 2004	3.2 MP; 1/3.2"	640×480 10 fps 320×240 15 fps	45–100 mm (2.2×)	DIGIC	1.5"	SD	107.0 × 53.4 × 36.8	165		Optical zoom
A410	September 2005	3.2 MP; 1/3.2"	640×480 10 fps 320×240 20 fps 160×120 15 fps	41–131 mm (3.2×)	DIGIC II	1.5"	SD	103 × 51.8 × 40.3	150		First A4xx with DIGIC II
A420	February 2006	4.0 MP; 1/3"	640×480 10 fps 320×240 30 fps 160×120 15 fps	39–125 mm (3.2×)	DIGIC II	1.8"	SD	103 × 51.8 × 40.3	150		Mostly sold in Europe, not in the U.S.
A430	February 2006	4.0 MP; 1/3"	640×480 10 fps 320×240 30 fps 160×120 15 fps	39–156 mm (4.0×)	DIGIC II	1.8"	SD	103 × 51.8 × 40.3	150		Mostly sold in the U.S.; first A4xx with microphone.
A450	February 2007	5.0 MP; 2592 × 1944; 1/3" CCD	640×480 10 fps 320×240 30 fps 160×120 15 fps	38–122 mm (3.2×) f/2.8–5.1	DIGIC II	2.0"; 86,000	SD, SDHC, MMC	106 × 52 × 40	165		
A460	March 2007	5.0 MP; 2592 × 1944; 1/3" CCD	640×480 10 fps 320×240 30 fps 160×120 15 fps	38–152 mm (4.0×) f/2.8–5.8	DIGIC II	2.0"; 86,000	SD, SDHC, MMC	106 × 52 × 40	165		
A470	January 2008	7.1 MP; 3072 × 2304; 1/2.5" CCD	640×480 20 fps 320×240 30 fps 160×120 15 fps	38–132 mm (3.4×) f/3.0–5.8	DIGIC III	2.5"; 115,000	SD, SDHC, MMC, MMC+, HC MMC+	105 × 55 × 41	165		
A480	March 2009	10.0 MP; 3648 × 2736; 1/2.3" CCD	640×480 30 fps	37–122 mm (3.3×) f/3.0–5.8	DIGIC III	2.5"; 115,000	SD, SDHC, MMC, MMC+, HC MMC+	92 × 62 × 31	140		
A490	February 2010	10.0 MP; 3648 × 2736; 1/2.3" CCD	640×480 30 fps	37–122 mm (3.3×) f/3.0–5.8	DIGIC III	2.5"; 115,000	SD, SDHC, SDXC, MMC, MMC+, HC MMC+	94 × 62 × 31	135		Face Detection AiAF / 5 point; Less Scene modes than in 495
A495	February 2010	10.0 MP; 3648 × 2736; 1/2.3" CCD	640×480 30 fps	37–122 mm (3.3×) f/3.0–5.8	DIGIC III	2.5"; 115,000	SD, SDHC, SDXC, MMC, MMC+, HC MMC+	94 × 62 × 31	135		Face Detection AiAF / 9 point; Additional 3 Scene modes (same as in A490 and FaceSelf-Timer, Super Vivid, Poster Effect)
A5xx series
A510	March 2005	3.2 MP; 2048 × 1536; 1/2.5" CCD	640×480 10 fps 320×240 15 fps	35–140 mm (4×) f/2.6–5.5	DIGIC	1.8"; 115,000	SD	91 × 64 × 38	180		New smaller, lighter body; replaced A75
A520	March 2005	4.0 MP; 2272 × 1704; 1/2.5" CCD	640×480 10 fps 320×240 15 fps	35–140 mm (4×) f/2.6–5.5	DIGIC	1.8"; 115,000	SD	91 × 64 × 38	180		New smaller, lighter body; replaced A75
A530	February 2006	5.0 MP; 2592 × 1944; 1/2.5" CCD	640×480 10 fps 320×240 20 fps 160×120 15 fps	35–140 mm (4×) f/2.6–5.5	DIGIC II	1.8"; 77,000	SD	90 × 64 × 43	170		Began trend of lower-end A5xx dropping conversion lenses and removal of manual modes, higher-end A5xx model still had conversion lens support and full manual modes DIGIC II
A540	February 2006	6.0 MP; 2816 × 2112; 1/2.5" CCD	640×480 30 fps	35–140 mm (4×) f/2.6–5.5	DIGIC II	2.5"; 85,000	SD	90 × 64 × 43	180		Began trend of lower-end A5xx dropping conversion lenses and reducing manual modes, higher-end A5xx model still had conversion lens support and full manual modes DIGIC II
A550	March 2007	7.1 MP; 3072 × 2304; 1/2.5" CCD	640×480 30 fps 320×240 60 fps	35–140 mm (4×) f/2.6–5.5	DIGIC II	2.0"; 86,000	SD, SDHC, MMC	91 × 64 × 43	160		Low-end model
A560	March 2007	7.1 MP; 3072 × 2304; 1/2.5" CCD	640×480 30 fps 320×240 60 fps	35–140 mm (4×) f/2.6–5.5	DIGIC III	2.5"; 115,000	SD, SDHC, MMC	91 × 64 × 43	165		Mid-range model, also lacks conversion lens support and full manual modes
A570 IS	March 2007	7.1 MP; 3072 × 2304; 1/2.5" CCD	640×480 30 fps 320×240 60 fps	35–140 mm (4×) f/2.6–5.5	DIGIC III	2.5"; 115,000	SD, SDHC, MMC	90 × 64 × 43	175		Optical image stabilization, full manual control, and compatibility with add-on lenses added
A580	January 2008	8.0 MP; 3264 × 2448; 1/2.5" CCD	640×480 20 fps 320×240 30 fps 160×120 15 fps	35–140 mm (4×) f/2.6–5.5	DIGIC III	2.5"; 115,000	SD,SDHC, MMC,MMC+, HC MMC+	94 × 65 × 41	175		Low-end model, lacks conversion lens support and full manual modes
A590 IS	January 2008	8.0 MP; 3264 × 2448; 1/2.5" CCD	640×480 20 fps 320×240 30 fps 160×120 15 fps	35–140 mm (4×) f/2.6–5.5	DIGIC III	2.5"; 115,000	SD,SDHC, MMC,MMC+, HC MMC+	94 × 65 × 41	175		Added Motion Detection Technology, Automatic Red-Eye Correction, has full manual mode.
Model	Release date	Sensor resolution, size, type	Video recording	Lens (35 mm equiv) zoom, aperture	Image processor	LCD screen size, pixels	Memory	Size W×H×D (mm)	Weight (body, g)	Photo	Notes
A6xx series
A610	October 2005	5.0 MP; 2592 × 1944; 1/1.8" CCD	640×480 30 fps 320×240 60 fps	35–140 mm (4×) f/2.8–4.1	DIGIC II	2.0" vari-angle 115,000	SD, MMC	105 × 66 × 49	235		Replaced A95
A620	October 2005	7.1 MP; 3072 × 2304; 1/1.8" CCD	640×480 30 fps 320×240 60 fps	35–140 mm (4×) f/2.8–4.1	DIGIC II	2.0" vari-angle 115,000	SD, MMC	105 × 66 × 49	235		Replaced A95
A630	September 2006	8.0 MP; 3264 × 2448; 1/1.8" CCD	640×480 30 fps	35–140 mm (4×) f/2.8–4.1	DIGIC II	2.5" vari-angle 115,000	SD, SDHC, MMC	109 × 66 × 49	245		Silver body color
A640	September 2006	10.0 MP; 3648 × 2736; 1/1.8" CCD	640×480 30 fps	35–140 mm (4×) f/2.8–4.1	DIGIC II	2.5" vari-angle 115,000	SD, SDHC, MMC	109 × 66 × 49	245		Black body color
A650 IS	August 2007	12.1 MP; 4000 × 3000; 1/1.7" CCD	640×480 30 fps	35–210 mm (6×) f/2.8–4.8	DIGIC III	2.5" vari-angle 115,000	SD, SDHC, MMC, MMC+, HC MMC+	112 × 68 × 56	200		Added Image Stabilization, increased maximum CCD sensitivity to ISO 1600 and DIGIC III.
A7xx series
A700	February 2006	6.0 MP; 2816 × 2112; 1/2.5" CCD	640×480 30 fps	35–210 mm (6×) f/2.8–4.8	DIGIC II	2.5"; 115,000	SD, MMC	95 × 67 × 43	200		Smaller, lighter body; Replaced A85
A710 IS	September 2006	7.1 MP; 3072 × 2304; 1/2.5" CCD	640×480 30 fps 320×240 60 fps	35–210 mm (6×) f/2.8–4.8	DIGIC II	2.5"; 115,000	SD, SDHC, MMC	98 × 67 × 41	210		
A720 IS	August 2007	8.0 MP; 3264 × 2448; 1/2.5" CCD	640×480 30 fps	35–210 mm (6×) f/2.8–4.8	DIGIC III	2.5"; 115,000	SD, SDHC, MMC, MMC+, HC MMC+	97 × 67 × 42	200		Increased maximum CCD sensitivity to ISO 1600 and DIGIC III.
A8xx series
A800	5 January 2011	10.0 MP; 3648 × 2736; 6.17 mm × 4.55 mm (1/2.3") CCD	640×480 30 fps	37 – 122 mm (3.3×) f/3.0–5.8	DIGIC III	6.2 cm (2.5"); 115,000	SD, SDHC, MMC, MMC+, HC MMC+	94 mm × 61 mm × 31 mm	186 g		Powered by 2 AA batteries Cheapest ever Canon Powershot (initial price $89).
A810	7 February 2012	16.0 MP; 4608 × 3456; 6.17 mm × 4.55 mm (1/2.3") CCD	720p 25 fps 640×480 30 fps	28 – 140 mm (5×) f/2.8–6.9	DIGIC 4	6.9 cm (2.7"); 230,000	SD, SDHC, SDXC	94.7 mm × 61.3 mm × 29.8 mm	171 g		Adds 720p HD video
Model	Release date	Sensor resolution, size, type	Video recording	Lens (35 mm equiv) zoom, aperture	Image processor	LCD screen size, pixels	Memory	Size W×H×D (mm)	Weight (body, g)	Photo	Notes
A1xxx Series
A1000 IS	August 2008	10.0 MP; 3648 × 2736; 1/2.3" CCD	640×480 30 fps	35–140 mm (4×) f/2.7–5.6	DIGIC III	2.5"; 115,000	SD, SDHC, MMC, MMC+, HC MMC+	96 × 63 × 31	155		Replaces A590 IS, new slimmer body design, no manual controls
A1100 IS	March 2009	12.1 MP; 4000 × 3000; 1/2.3" CCD	640×480 30 fps	35–140 mm (4×) f/2.7–5.6	DIGIC 4	2.5"; 115,000	SD, SDHC, MMC, MMC+, HC MMC+	96 × 63 × 31	155		
A1200	March 2011	12.1 MP; 4000 × 3000; 1/2.3" CCD	720p 24 fps 640×480 30 fps	28–112 mm (4×) f/2.8–5.9	DIGIC 4	2.7” 230,000	SD, SDHC, MMC, MMC+, HC MMC+	97.5 × 62.5 × 30.7	185		Limited PTP Control, no UV Filter, no manual controls, can not refocus while recording video
A1300	February 2012	16.0 MP; 4608 × 3456; 1/2.3" CCD	720p 25 fps 640×480 30 fps	28–140 mm (5×) f/2.8–6.9	DIGIC 4	2.7” 230,000	SD, SDHC, SDXC	95 × 62 × 30	174		No image stabilization, no manual focus, no aperture/shutter priority, no manual exposure mode, etc.
A1400	2013	16.0 MP; 4608 × 3456; 1/2.3" CCD	720p 25 fps 640×480 30 fps	28–140 mm (5×) f/2.8–6.9	DIGIC 4	2.7” 230,000	SD, SDHC, SDXC	94.7 × 61.7 × 29.8	174		Adds ECO mode
A2xxx Series
A2000 IS	August 2008	10.0 MP; 3648 × 2736; 1/2.3" CCD	640×480 30 fps	36–216 mm (6×) f/3.2–5.9	DIGIC III	3.0"; 230,000	SD, SDHC, MMC, MMC+, HC MMC+	102 × 64 × 32	185		Replaces A720 IS, new slimmer body design, no viewfinder or manual controls
A2100 IS	April 2009	12.1 MP; 4000 × 3000; 1/2.3" CCD	640×480 30 fps	36–216 mm (6×) f/3.2–5.9	DIGIC 4	3.0"; 230,000	SD, SDHC, MMC, MMC+, HC MMC+	102 × 64 × 32	185		
A2200	2011	14.1 MP; 4320 × 3240; 1/2.3" CCD	720p 30 fps	28–112 mm (4×) f/2.8–5.9	DIGIC 4	2.7” 230,000	SD, SDHC, SDXC, MMC, MMC+, HC MMC+	93.2 × 57.2 × 23.6	135		No image stabilization, adds 720p HD video
A2300	2012	16.0 MP; 4608 × 3456; 1/2.3" CCD	720p 25 fps 640×480 30 fps	28–140 mm (5×) f/2.8–6.9	DIGIC 4	2.7” 230,000	SD, SDHC, SDXC, MMC, MMC+, HC MMC+	94.4 × 54.2 × 20.1	125		
A2400 IS	2012	16.0 MP; 4608 × 3456; 1/2.3" CCD	720p 25 fps 640×480 30 fps	28–140 mm (5×) f/2.8–6.9	DIGIC 4	2.7” 230,000	SD, SDHC, SDXC, MMC, MMC+, HC MMC+	94.4 × 56.3 × 21.3	141		Adds optical image stabilization
A2500	2013	16.0 MP; 4608 × 3456; 1/2.3" CCD	720p 25 fps 640×480 30 fps	28–140 mm (5×) f/2.8–6.9	DIGIC 4	2.7” 230,000	SD, SDHC, SDXC, MMC, MMC+, HC MMC+	97.7 × 56.0 × 20.9	125		No image stabilization, adds ECO mode
A2600	2013	16.0 MP; 4608 × 3456; 1/2.3" CCD	720p 25 fps 640×480 30 fps	28–140 mm (5×) f/2.8–6.9	DIGIC 4	3.0” 230,000	SD, SDHC, SDXC, MMC, MMC+, HC MMC+	97.7 × 56.0 × 19.8	135		No image stabilization, adds ECO mode
A3xxx Series
A3000 IS	February 2010	10.0 MP; 3648 × 2736; 1/2.3" CCD	640×480 30 fps	35–140 mm (4×) f/2.7–5.6	DIGIC III	2.7"; 230,000	SD, SDHC, SDXC, MMC, MMC+, HC MMC+	97 × 58 × 28	125		First A series model to use lithium-ion battery
A3100 IS	February 2010	12.1 MP; 4000 × 3000; 1/2.3" CCD	640×480 30 fps	35–140 mm (4×) f/2.7–5.6	DIGIC III	2.7"; 230,000	SD, SDHC, SDXC, MMC, MMC+, HC MMC+	97 × 58 × 28	125		First A series model to use lithium-ion battery
A3200 IS	2011	14.1 MP; 4320 × 3240; 1/2.3" CCD	720p 30 fps	28–140 mm (5×) f/2.8–5.9	DIGIC 4	2.7"; 230,000	SD, SDHC, SDXC, MMC, MMC+, HC MMC+	95.1 × 56.7 × 24.3	149		Adds 720p HD video
A3300 IS	2011	16.0 MP; 4608 × 3456; 1/2.3" CCD	720p 30 fps	28–140 mm (5×) f/2.8–5.9	DIGIC 4	3.0"; 230,400	SD, SDHC, SDXC, MMC, MMC+, HC MMC+	95.1 × 56.7 × 23.9	149		Adds 720p HD video Advanced Smart AUTO feature-
A3400 IS	2012	16.0 MP; 4608 × 3456; 1/2.3" CCD	720p 25 fps 640×480 30 fps	28–140 mm (5×) f/2.8–6.9	DIGIC 4	3.0"; 230,400 touch	SD, SDHC, SDXC, MMC, MMC+, HC MMC+	94.4 × 56.3 × 21.3	141		Adds touchscreen
A3500 IS	2013	16.0 MP; 4608 × 3456; 1/2.3" CCD	720p 25 fps 640×480 30 fps	28–140 mm (5×) f/2.8–6.9	DIGIC 4	3.0"; 230,400 non-touch	SD, SDHC, SDXC, MMC, MMC+, HC MMC+	94.4 × 56.3 × 21.3	141		Adds WiFi and GPS via mobile
A4xxx Series
A4000 IS	2012	16.0 MP; 4608 × 3456; 1/2.3" CCD	720p 25 fps 640×480 30 fps	28–224 mm (8×) f/3.0–5.9	DIGIC 4	3.0” 230,000	SD, SDHC, SDXC, MMC, MMC+, HC MMC+	95.3 × 56.3 × 24.3	145		8x optical zoom

== Sample photographs ==
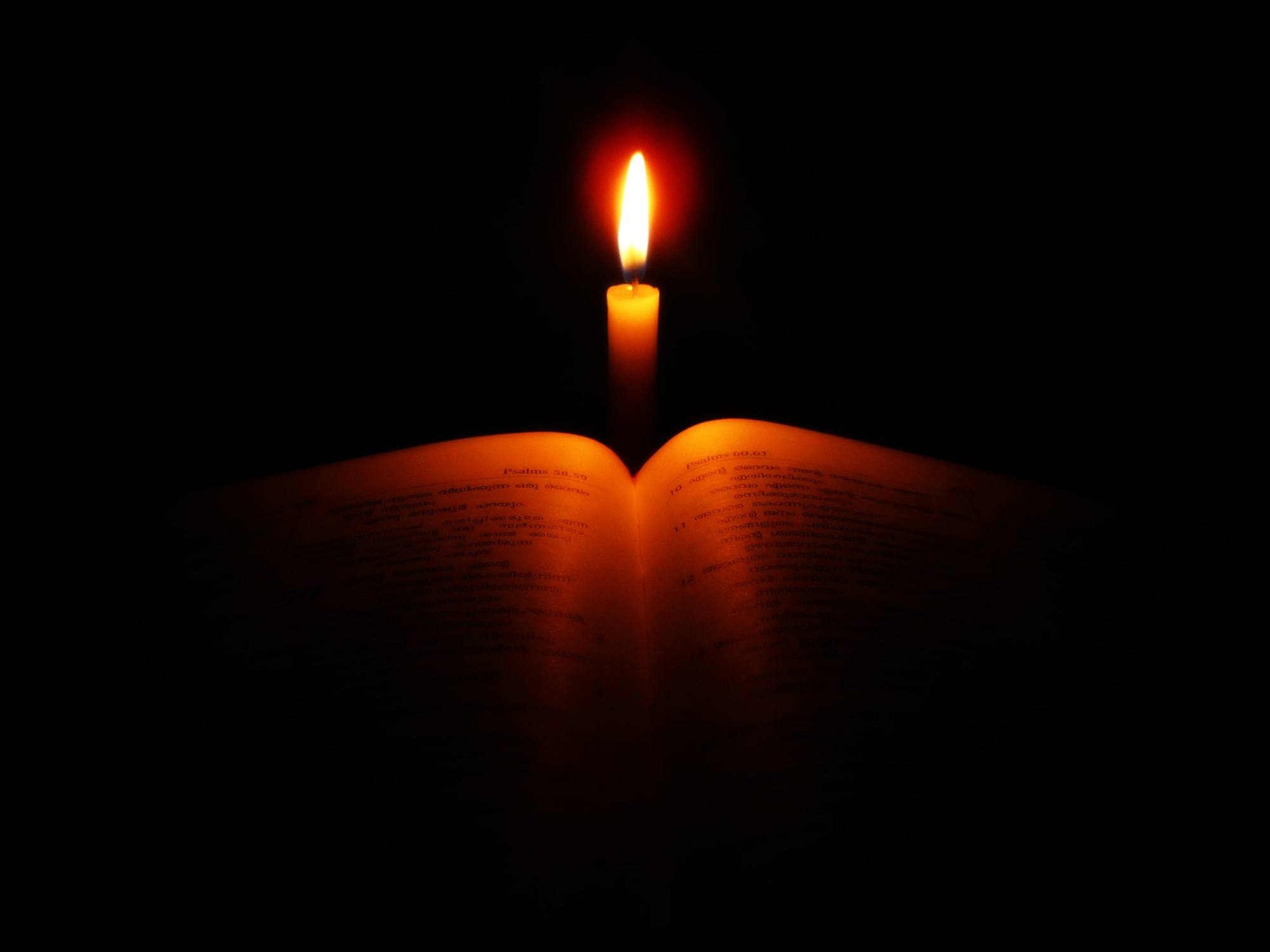
A495

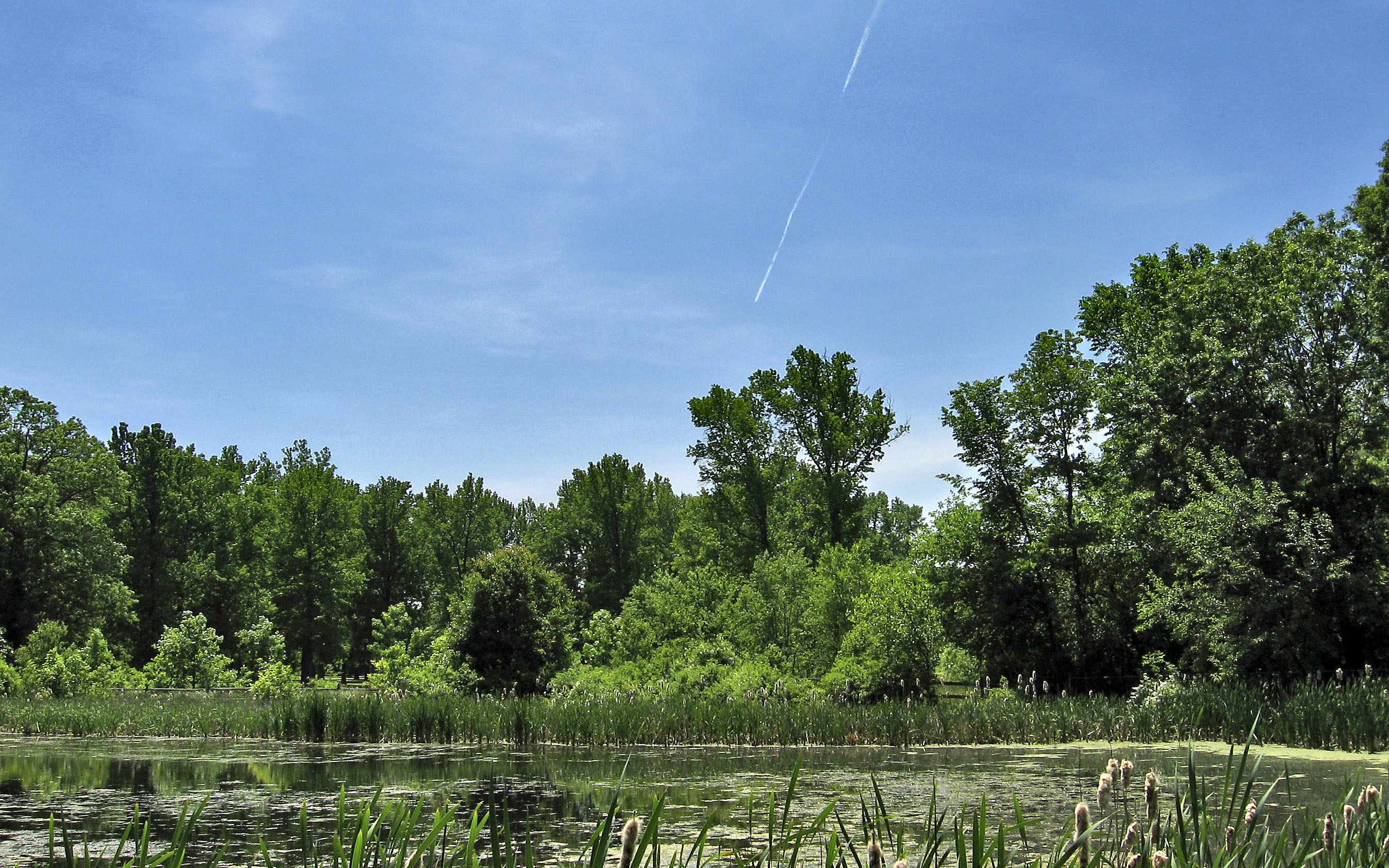
A540

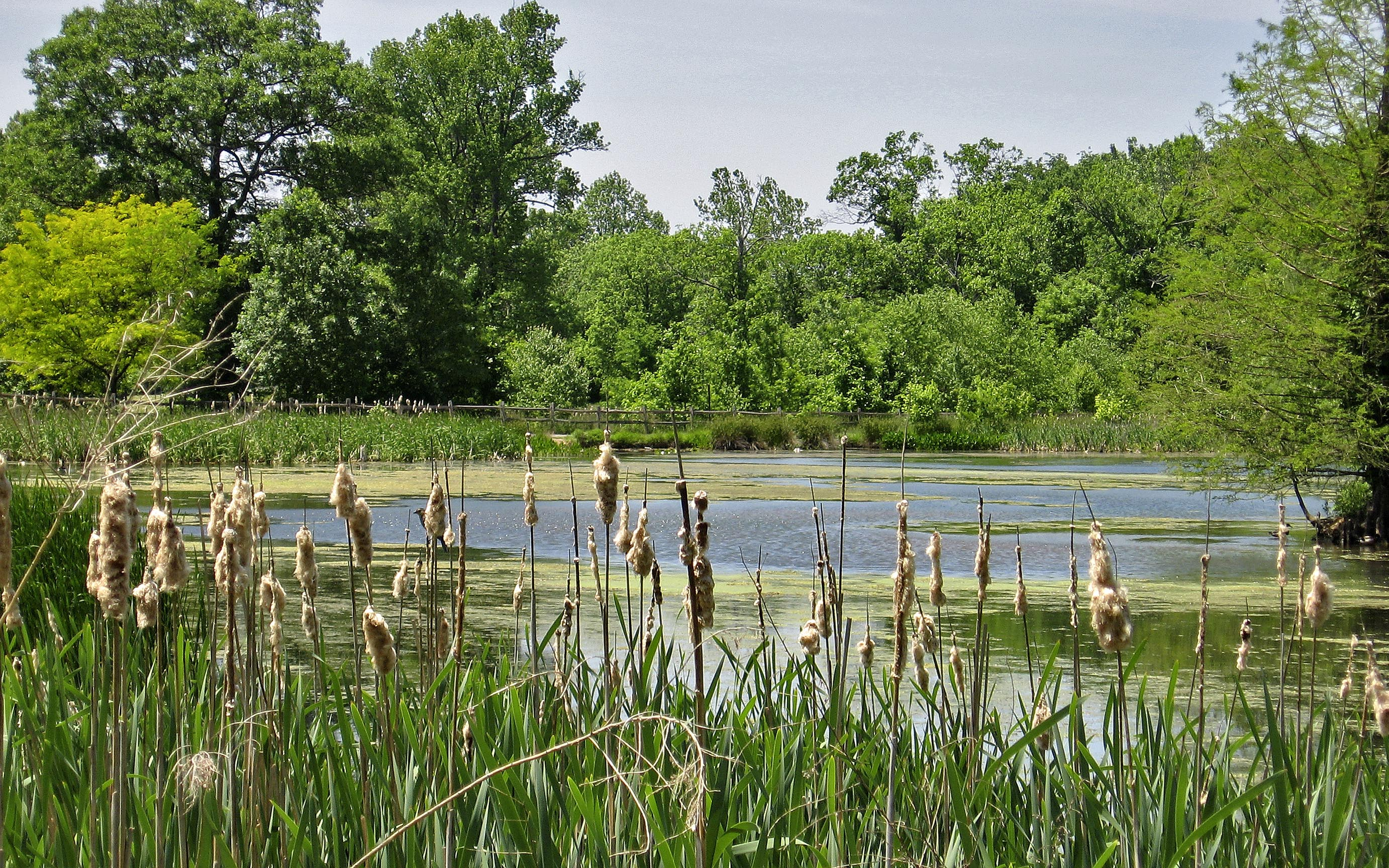
A540

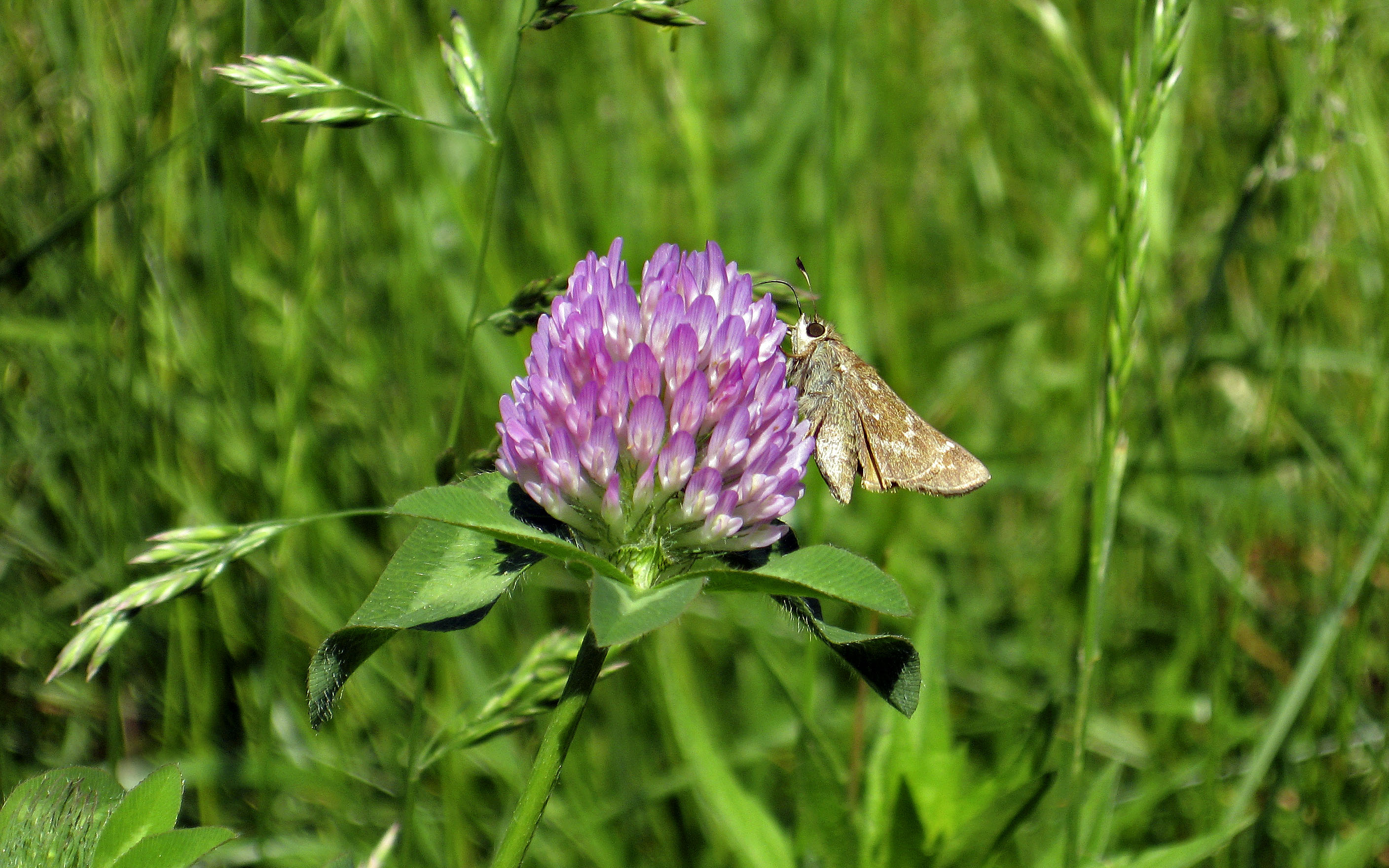
A540

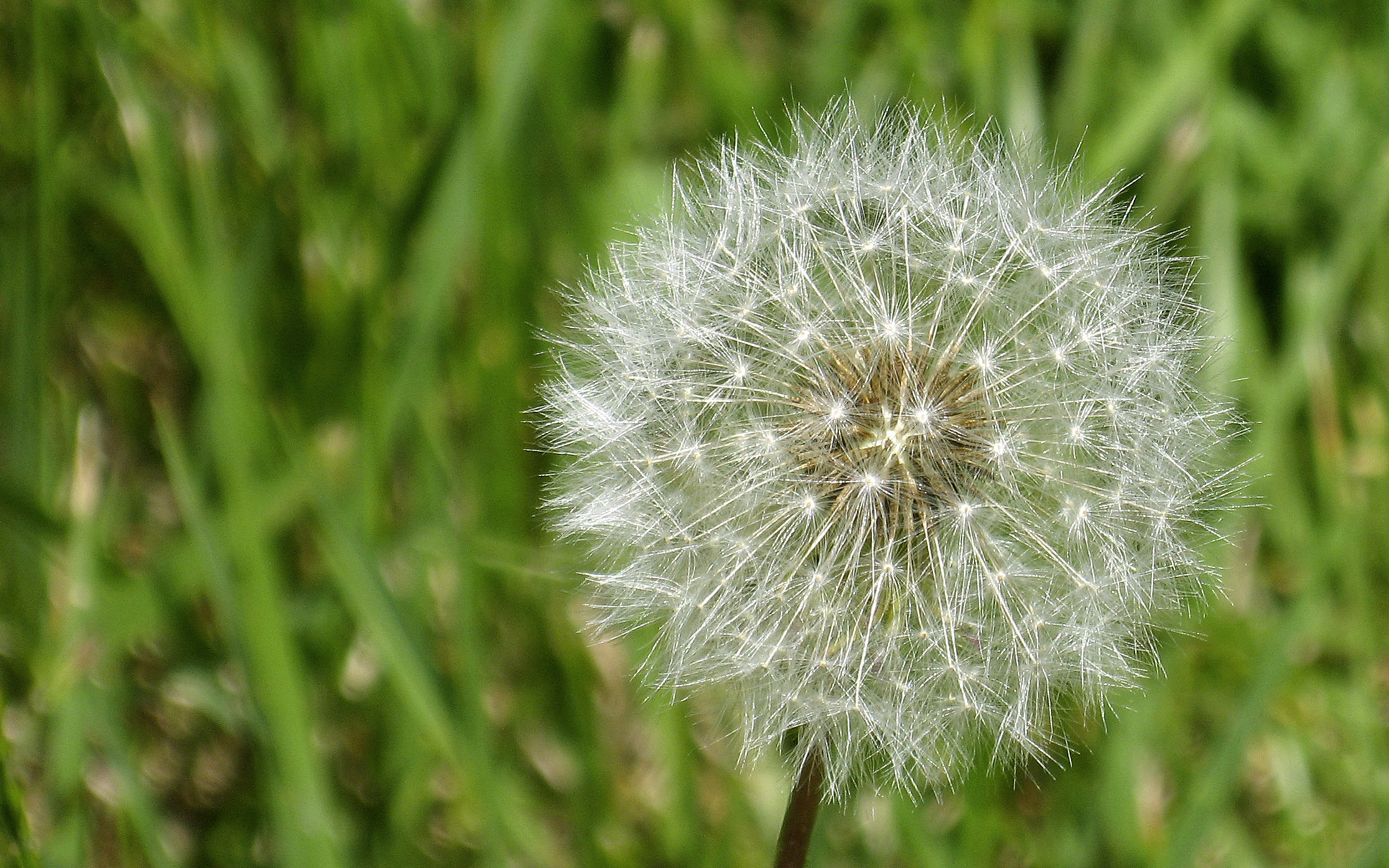
A540

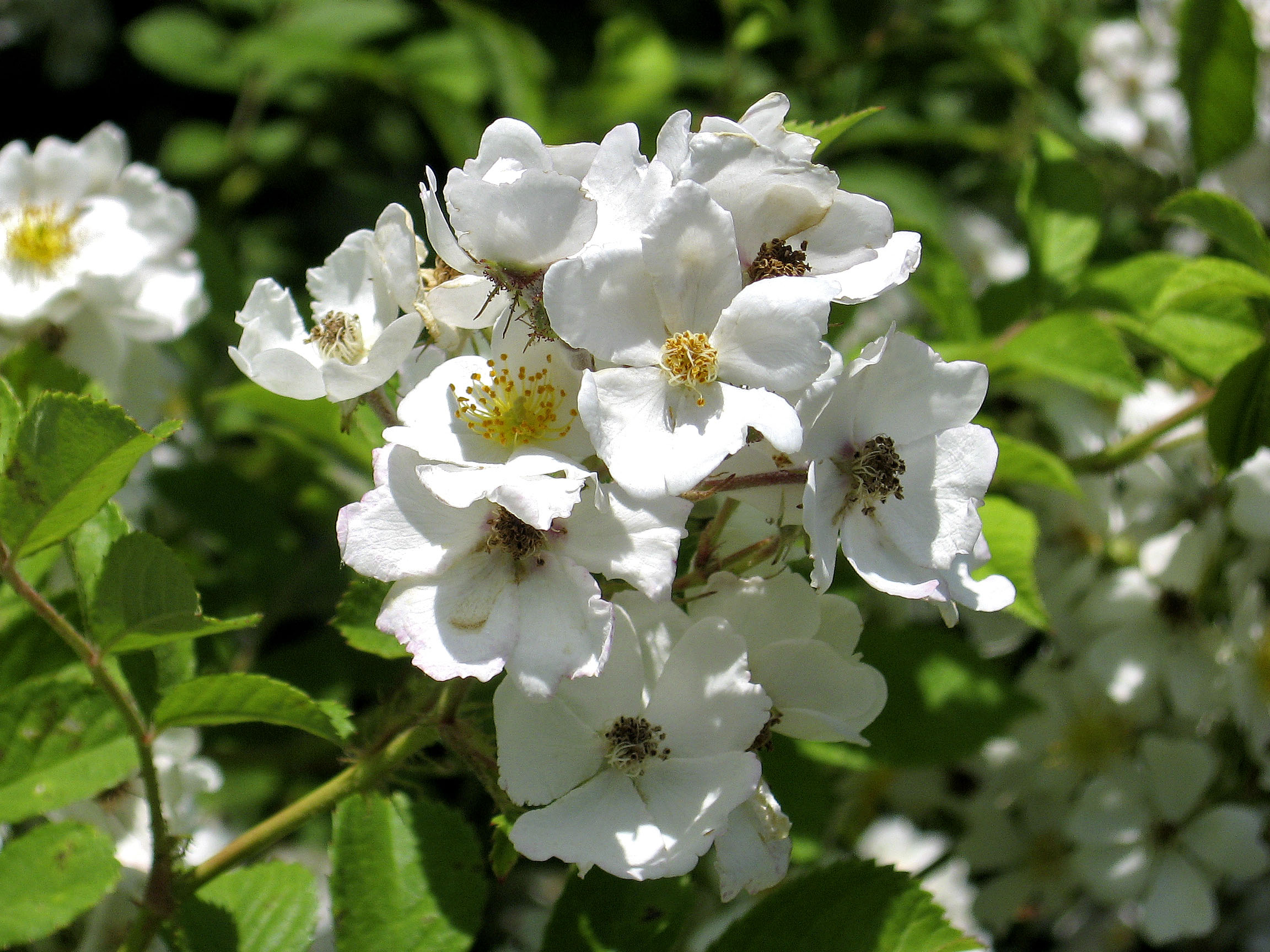
A540

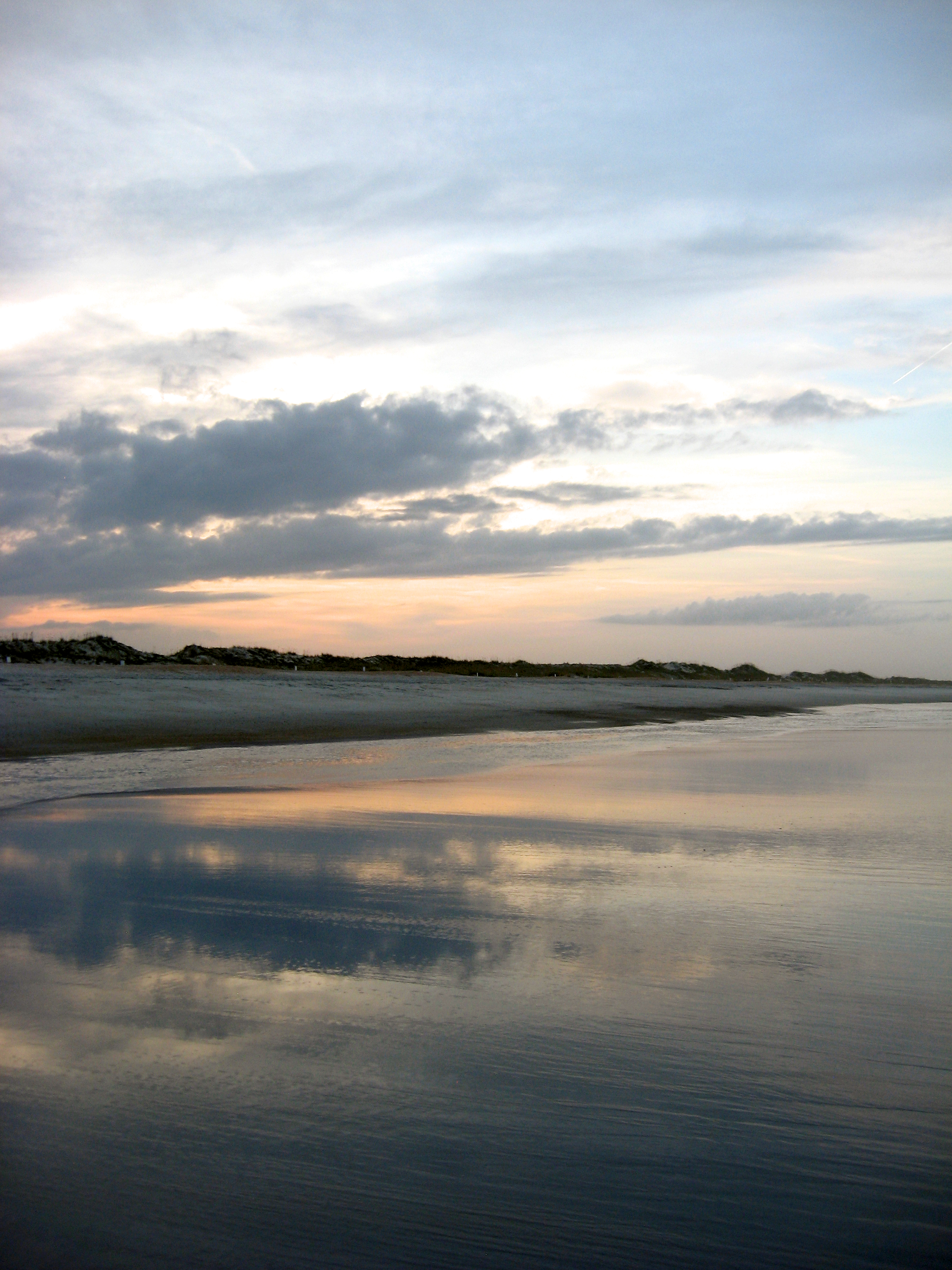
A560

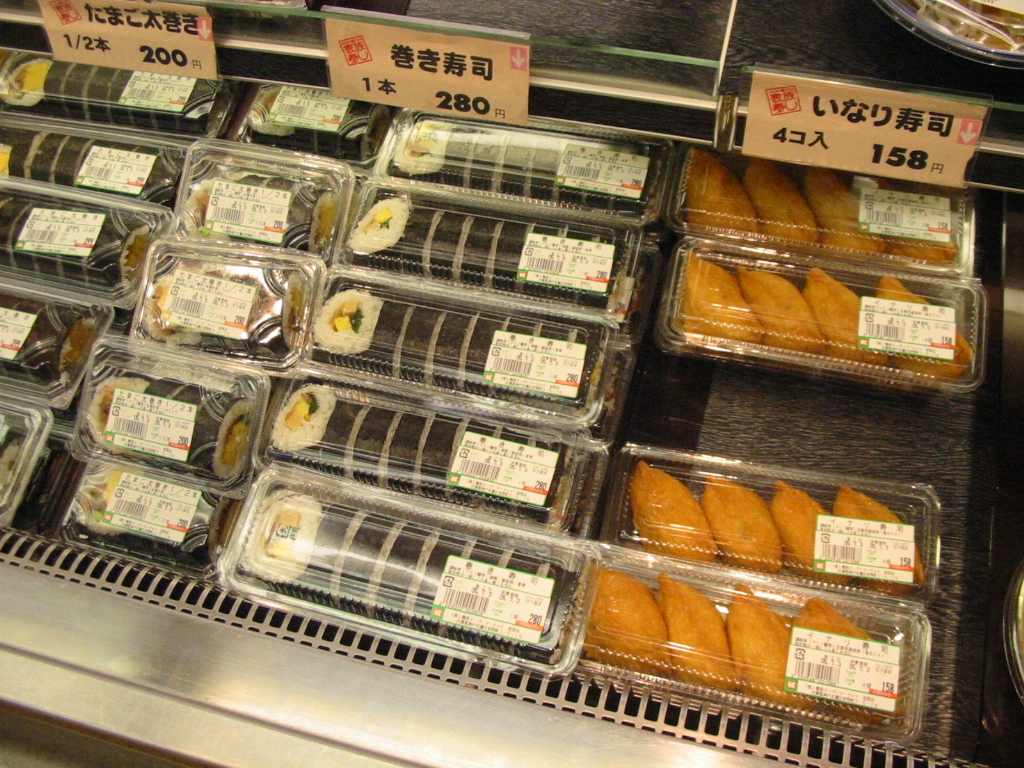
A40

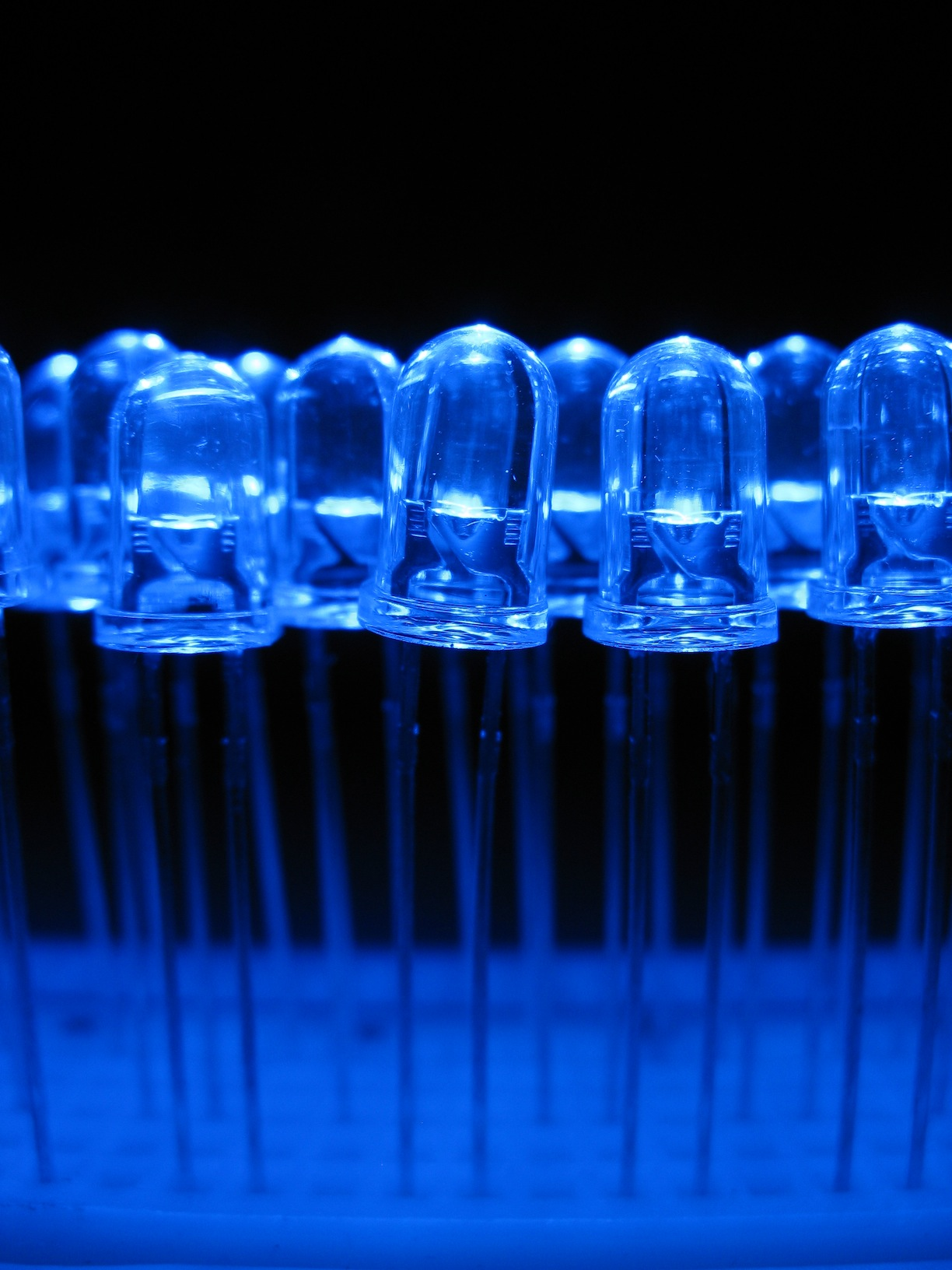
A720 IS

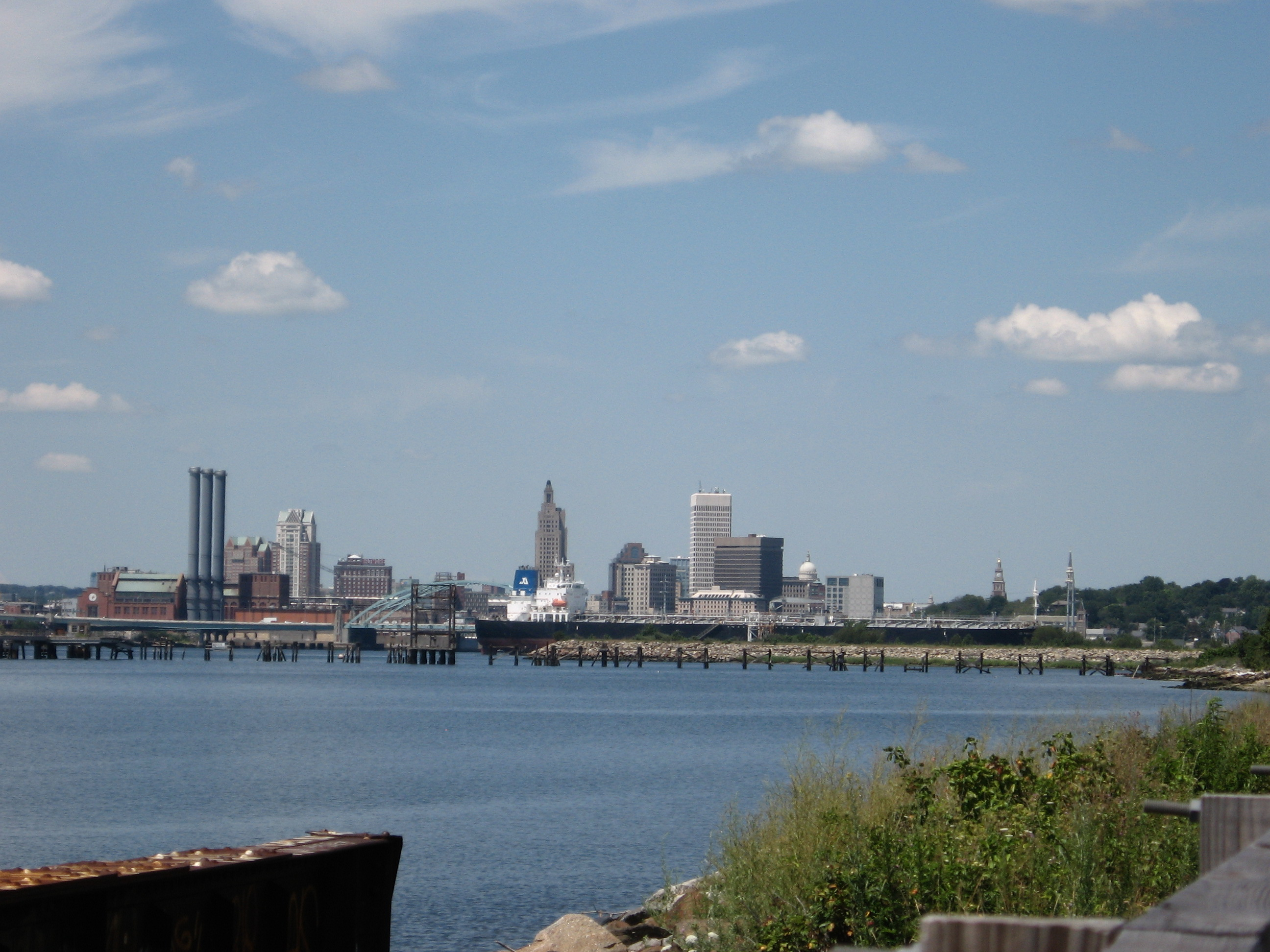
A530

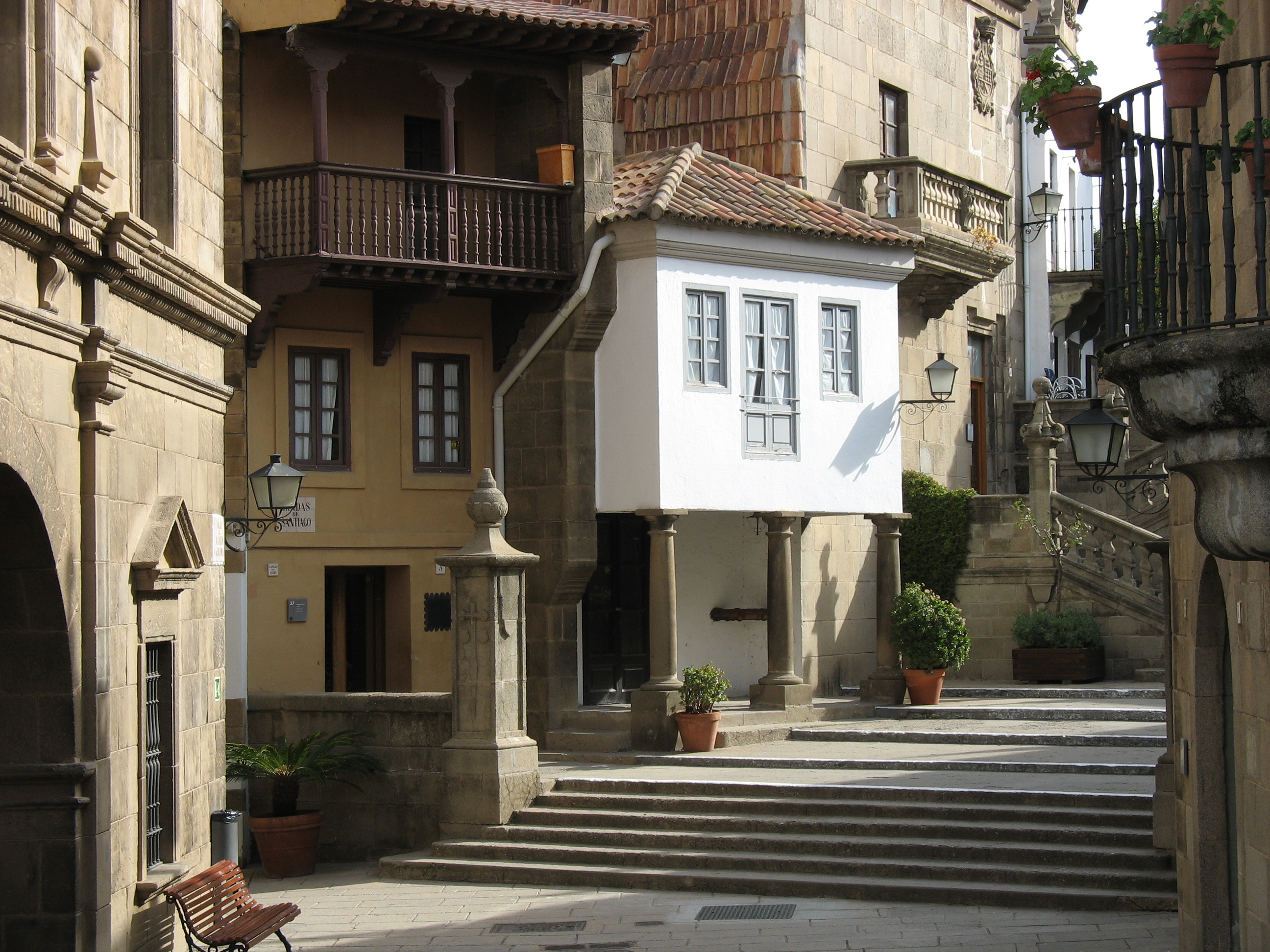
A610

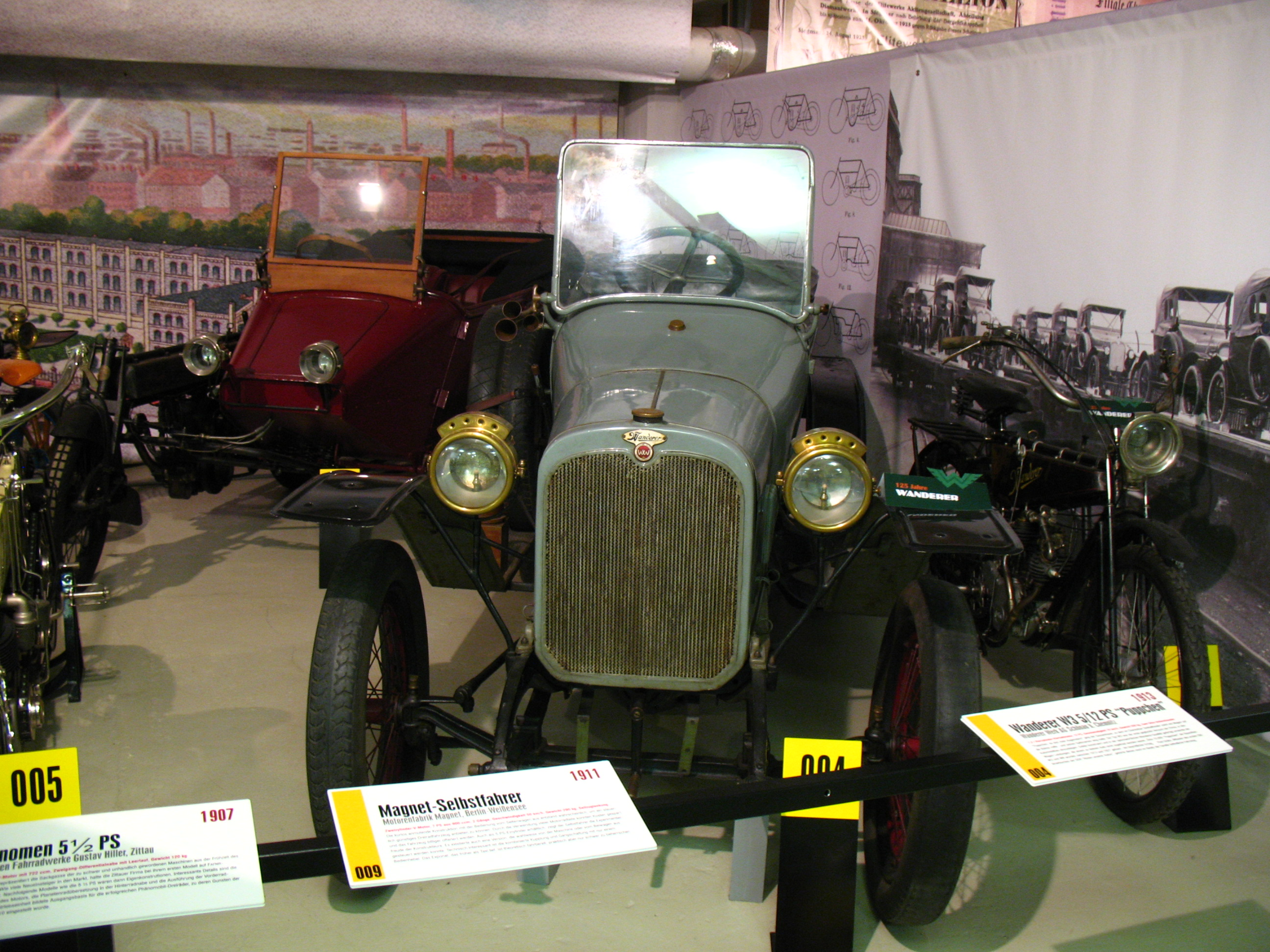
A630

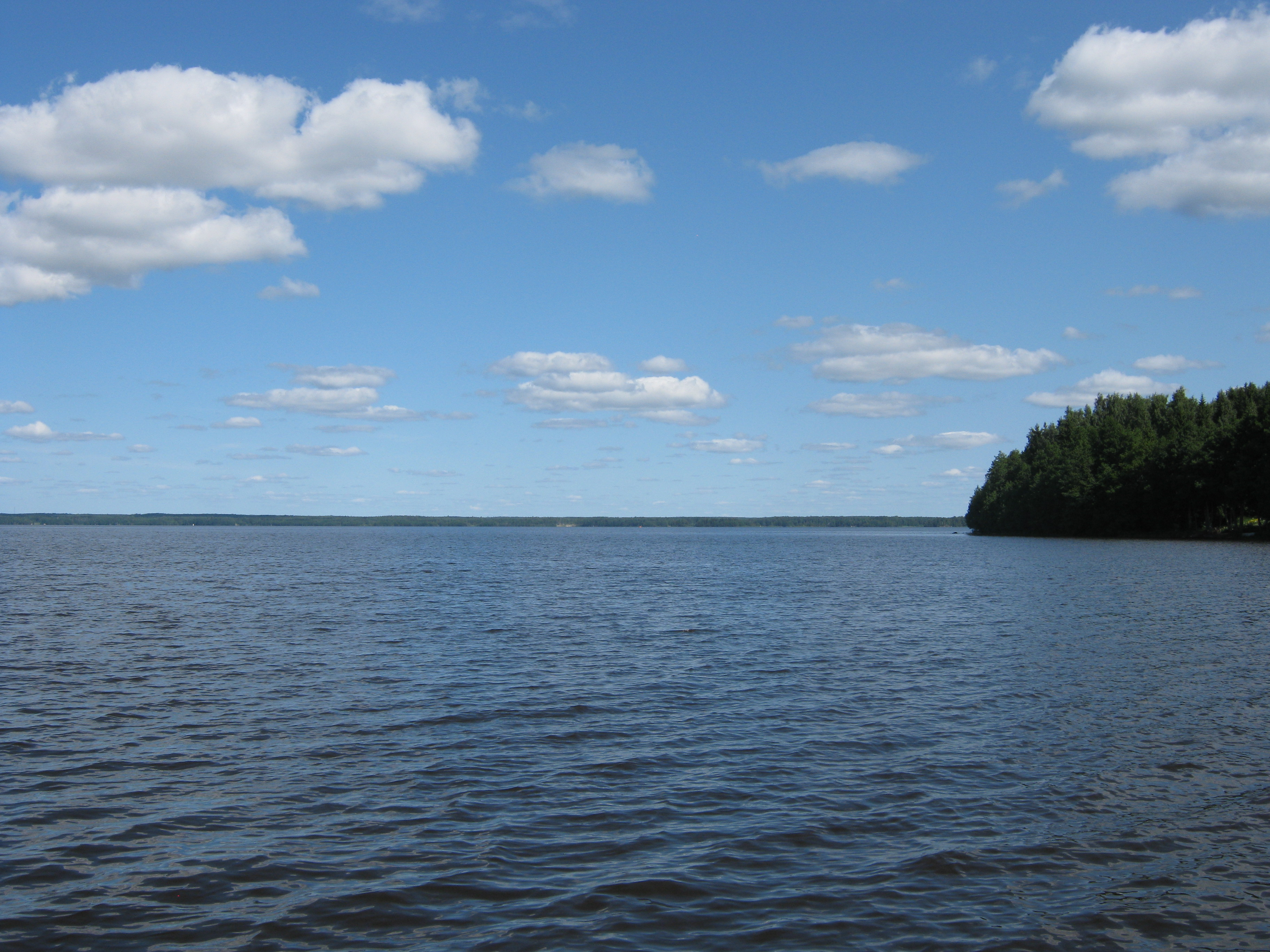
A480

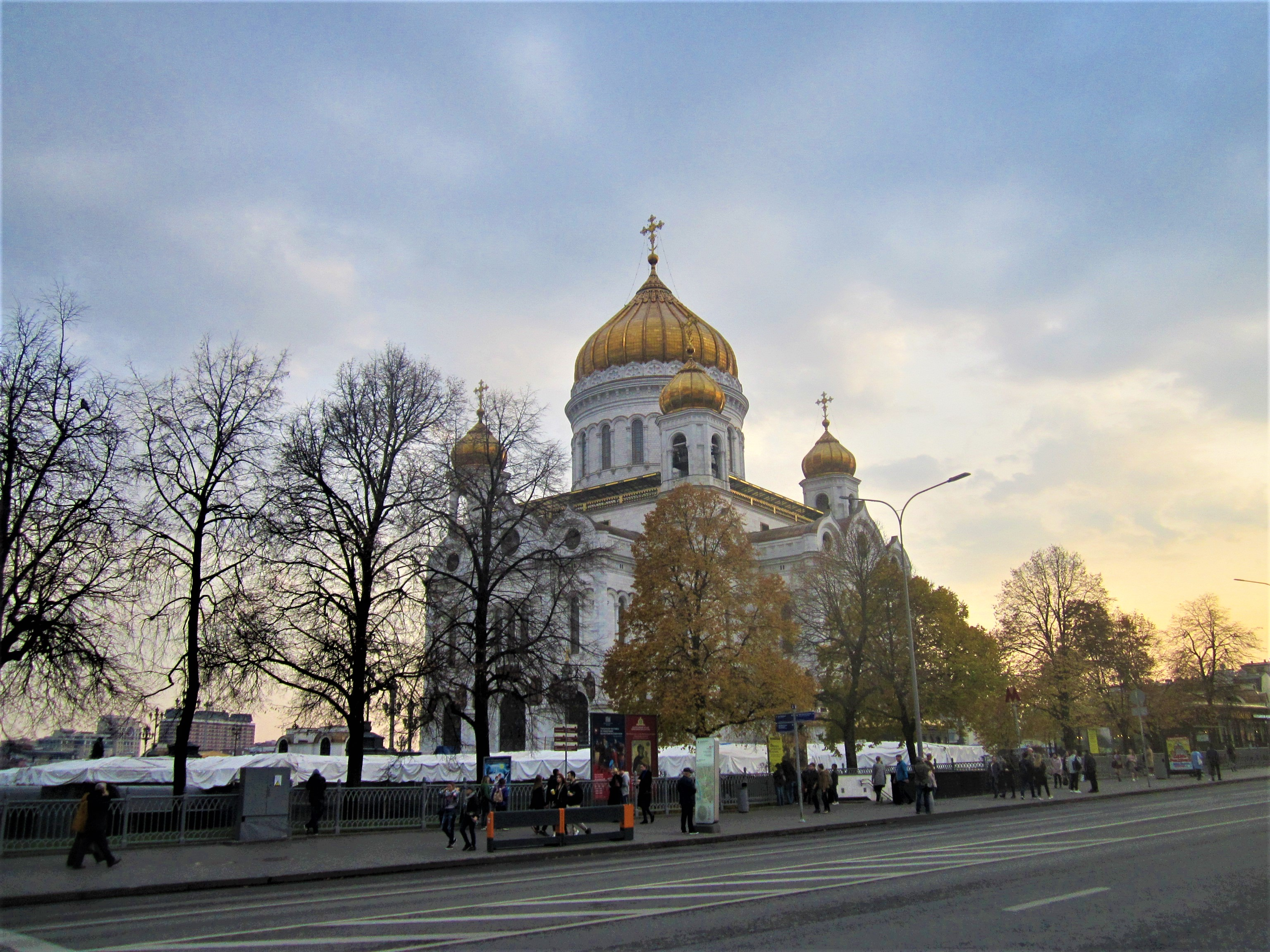
A2200

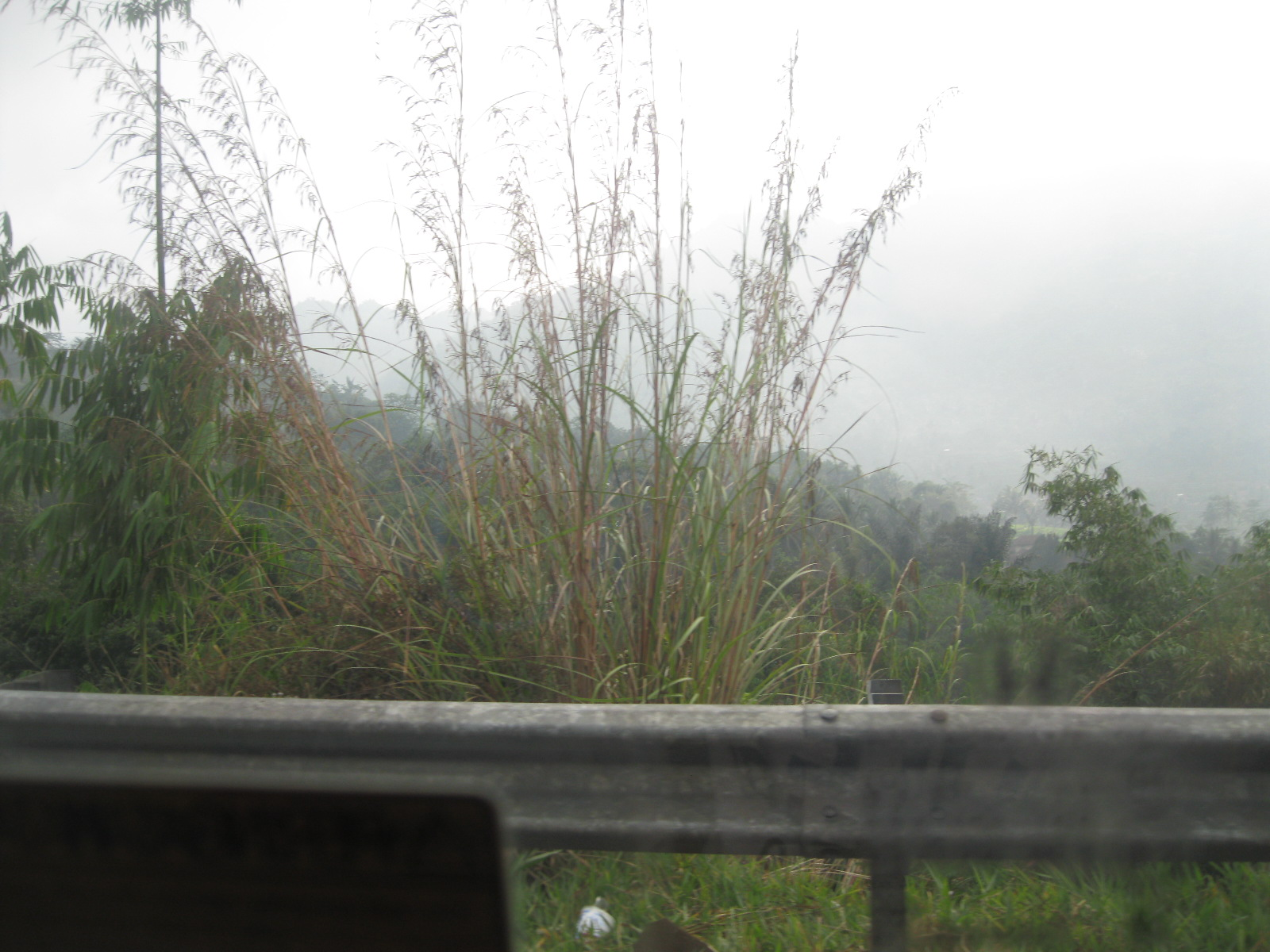
A3100 IS

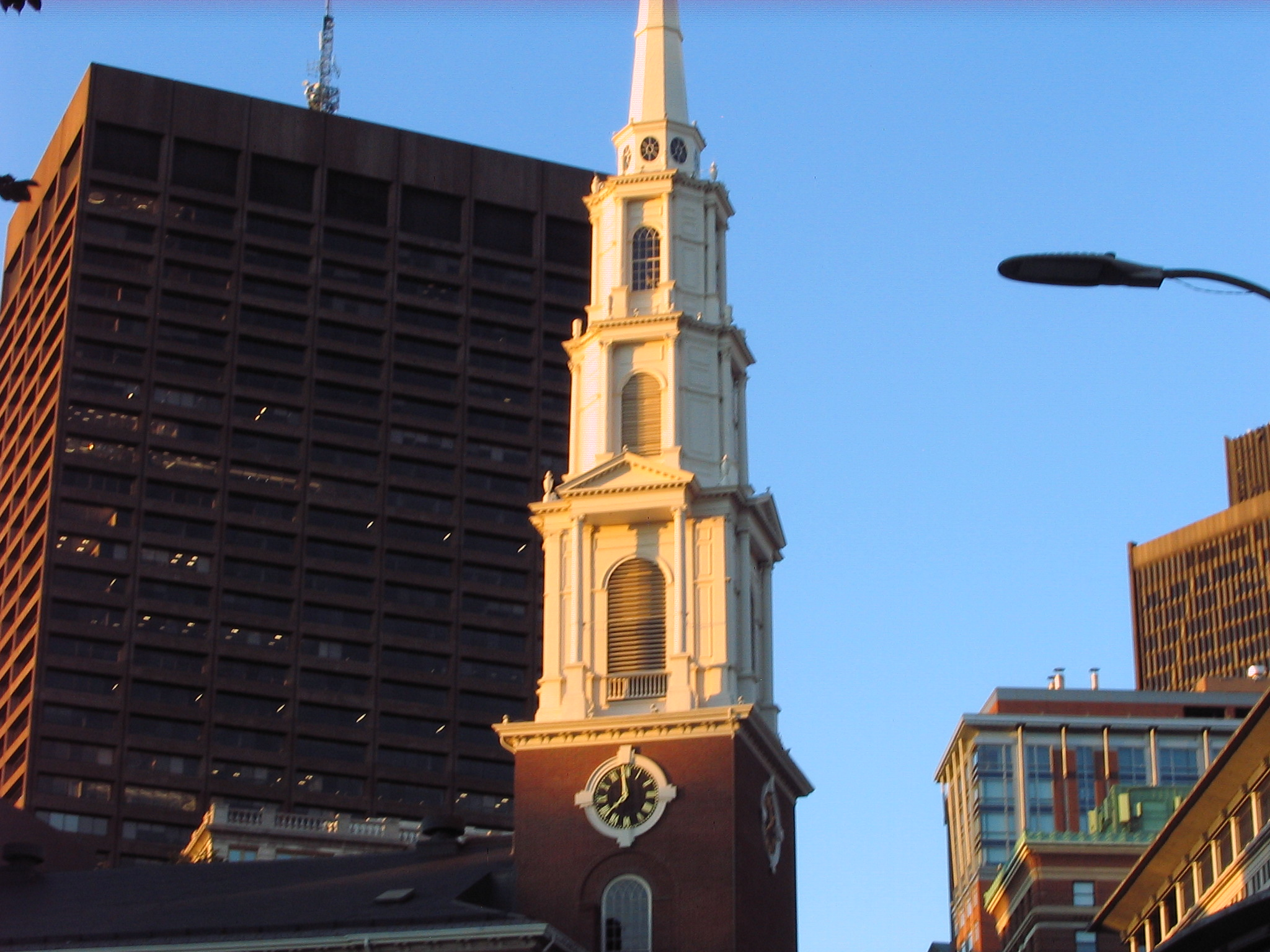
A75

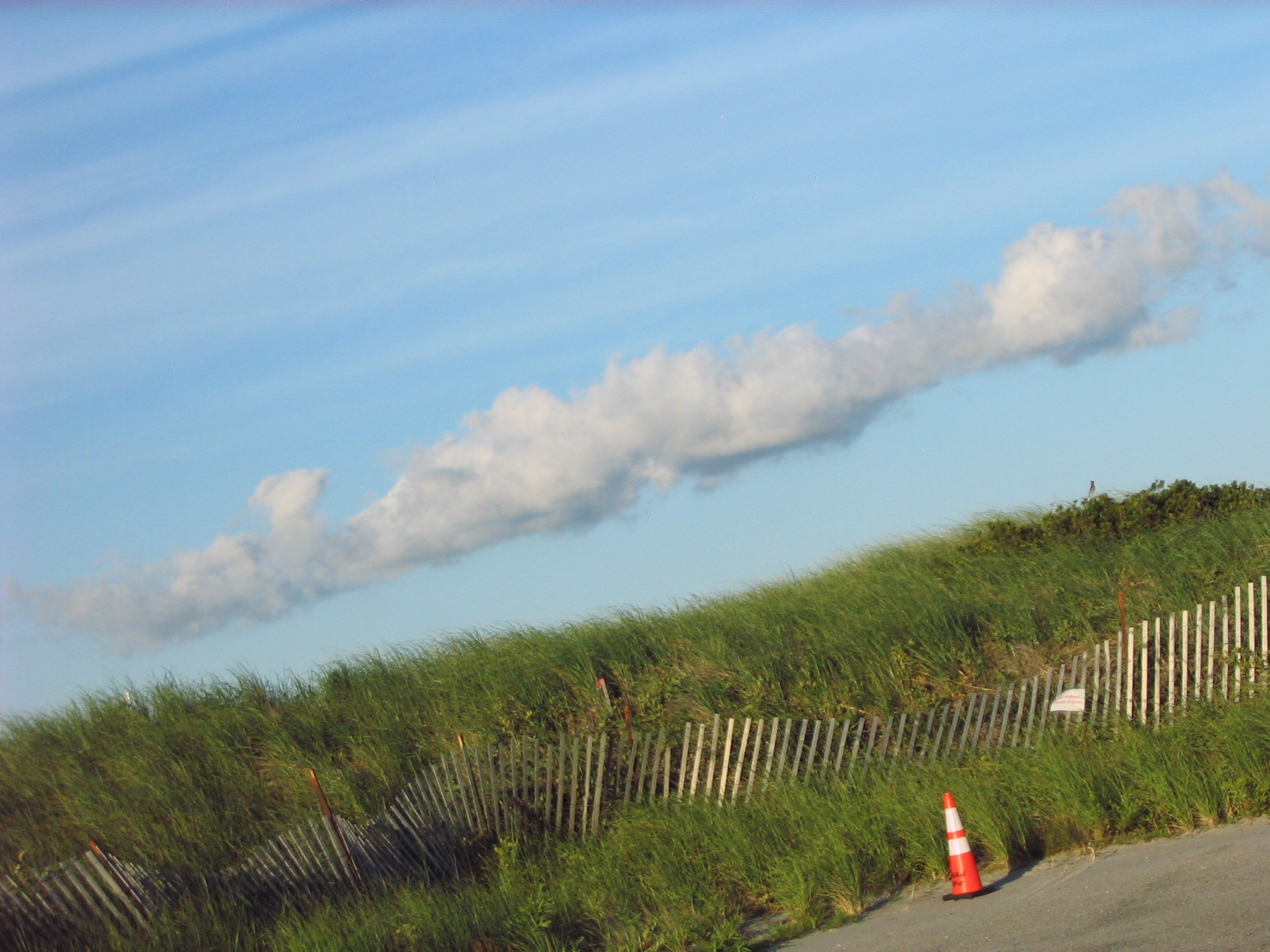
A75

== See also ==
- Canon PowerShot
- Canon PowerShot G
- Canon PowerShot S
- Canon Digital IXUS or PowerShot Digital ELPH
- List of digital cameras with CCD sensors
