= E18 =

E18 or E-18 may refer to:

- County Route E18 (California), a county route in California
- DRG Class E 18, a class of German electric locomotives
- E18, a postcode district in the E postcode area of London
- E18 Album, an album by the band Detektivbyrån
- E18 error, a Canon digital camera error code
- Enlightenment (software) version 0.18, a window manager
- European route E18, a non-continuous road and ferry route in the United Kingdom and Fennoscandia
- HMS E18, a submarine of the Royal Navy
- Jōshin-etsu Expressway, route E18 in Japan
- Kajang Dispersal Link Expressway, route E18 in Malaysia
