= Canon Digital IXUS =

Point-and-shoot camera line (2000–2017)

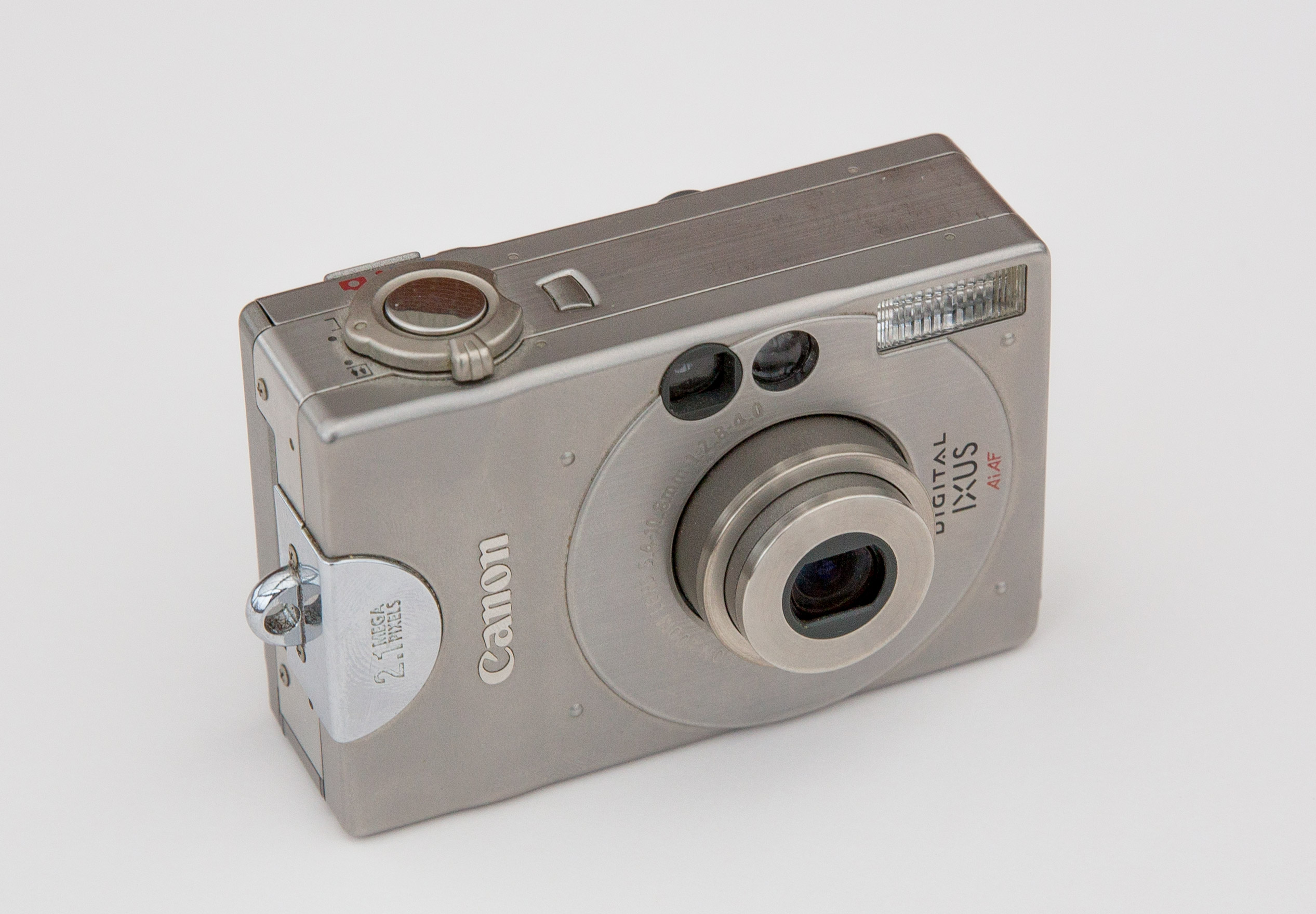
The original Canon Digital IXUS

The Digital IXUS (IXY Digital in Japan and PowerShot Digital ELPH in US and Canada) is a series of digital cameras released by Canon. It is a line of ultracompact cameras, originally based on the design of Canon's IXUS/IXY/ELPH line of APS cameras.

== History ==
Canon's PowerShot A and S line of the time were being made as small as contemporary technology allowed, and demonstrated the demand for a small digital camera of good quality. Canon used its experience with small film cameras, particularly the APS IXUS, to mass-produce good digital cameras smaller than anyone else had managed up to the time (the first Digital IXUS was the smallest 2 MP then available) and reused the popular IXUS/IXY/ELPH brand name with the tag line "The DIGITAL IXUS blends Canon's award-winning IXUS design with PowerShot digital technology."

The first Digital IXUS, released in June 2003 fitted the technology of the PowerShot S11 into a body similar to the APS IXUS II. Between 2004 and 2005, starting with the Digital IXUS II, Canon moved from the use of CF cards to SD cards to create thinner cameras.

Several models have found favor within the Kite Aerial Photography (KAP) community due to a unique combination of small size/ low weight, excellent image quality with stabilization, and the option of expanded manual control including intervalometer functionality available via 3rd party CHDK.

== G-series in a compact body ==
The IXUS 900Ti was the first in a series of IXUS and S-series cameras that feature the Digic image processors and larger than average sensors as fitted to the advanced PowerShot G-series cameras. The IXUS / S-series and the equivalent G-series models are listed below:

- IXUS 900 Ti (SD900)* / PowerShot G7 / Digic III / 10 MP 3648 × 2736 1/1.8″ CCD.
- IXUS 960 IS (SD950IS)* / PowerShot G9 / Digic III / 12.1 MP 4000 × 3000 1/1.7″ CCD.
- IXUS 980 IS (SD990IS) / PowerShot G10 / Digic 4 / 14.7 MP 4416 × 3312 1/1.7″ CCD.
- PowerShot S90, S95, S200 / PowerShot G11, G12 / Digic 4 / 10 MP 3648 × 2736 1/1.7″ CCD (S200 features Digic 5).
- PowerShot S100, S120 / PowerShot G15 / Digic 5 / 12.1 MP 4000×3000 1/1.7" CMOS.
- Powershot S120 / PowerShot G16 / Digic 6 / 12.1 MP 4000×3000 1/1.7" CMOS.

(* The IXUS 900 Ti and 960 IS feature a titanium body.)

== Models ==
The same camera models are released in Europe, the US, and Japan under different names. The cameras themselves are identical apart from the front fascia, according to the parts lists. The Canon model number on the bottom is consistent between marketing names. This article uses the Digital IXUS model names unless otherwise stated. The comparison tables in this article list equivalent IXY Digital and PowerShot Digital ELPH model names.

All models use lithium ion batteries of Canon proprietary design, though third-party equivalents are readily available.

All models introduced before 2010 use RGBG Bayer filter (except the original Digital IXUS, which uses a CYGM filter) CCD sensors made by Sony. IXUS 300 HS/PowerShot Digital ELPH SD4000 IS/IXY 30S introduced in May 2010 and almost all following models have back-illuminated CMOS sensor. Exceptions exist, such as the PowerShot ELPH 180 which was released in 2016 and has a CCD. Images are recorded as JPEGs. Raw image files are not accessible without the use of third party firmware such as CHDK.

In 2010, Canon dropped the prefix "Digital" as well as suffix "IS" (Image Stabilization) from the names of the new models e.g. IXUS 105. A similar change was applied to the IXY-series names used in the Japanese market. The United States market naming was simplified in 2011: "Digital" and "IS" were removed as well as "SD" prefix. Newer US and European model carry "HS" suffix, that stands for "high sensitivity".

The Digital IXUS series slots above the PowerShot A in Canon's point-and-shoot lineup, with models in the Digital IXUS range commanding a considerable price premium. However, since the late 2000s, with the falling prices of Digital IXUS models in Canadian and U.S. markets, they have become among some of the lower-priced models available as PowerShot A models are gradually withdrawn from the market and not replaced.

=== IXUS/ELPH/IXY cameras using CF storage ===
The PowerShot Digital ELPH using CF have Sxxx model number.

Digital IXUS	PowerShot Digital ELPH	IXY Digital	Canon model	Release date	Sensor res., size	Movie mode	Lens (35 mm equiv.) zoom, aperture	Image processor	Memory	Battery	Dimensions (mm)	Weight (-batt.)	Photo	Notes
Digital IXUS^{1}	S100	IXY Digital	PC1001	17 May 2000	2.0 MP; 1600×1200; 1/2.7"	No movie mode	35–70 mm (2×) f/2.8–4.0		CF	NB-1L	87 × 57 × 26.9	190 g		Only IXUS with a CYGM CCD (all others are RGBG)
300	S300	300	PC1008	11 Feb 2001	2.0 MP; 1600×1200; 1/2.7"	640×480 20 fps	35–105 mm (3×) f/2.7–4.7		CF	NB-1L	94.8 × 62.5 × 29.9	240 g		Introduce motion capture up to 640 × 480
v	S110	200	PC1012	10 May 2001	2.0 MP; 1600×1200; 1/2.7"	640×480 20 fps	35–70 mm (2×) f/2.8–4.0		CF	NB-1L	87.0 × 57.0 × 26.9	180 g		
v^{2}	S200	200a	PC1022	13 Mar 2002	2.0 MP; 1600×1200; 1/2.7"	640×480 20 fps	35–70 mm (2×) f/2.8–4.0		CF	NB-1L	87.0 × 57.0 × 26.9	180 g		Improved user interface; user-selectable ISO up to 400
330	S330	300a	PC1026	13 Mar 2002	2.0 MP; 1600×1200; 1/2.7"	640×480 20 fps	35–105 mm (3×) f/2.7–4.7		CF	NB-1L	94.8 × 62.5 × 31.5	245 g		More software features
v^{3}	S230	320	PC1037	16 Aug 2002	3.2 MP; 2048×1536; 1/2.7"	640×480 15 fps	35–70 mm (2×) f/2.8–4.0	DIGIC	CF	NB-1L	87.0 × 57.0 × 26.7	180 g		
400	S400	400	PC1038	27 Feb 2003	4.0 MP; 2272×1704; 1/1.8"	320×240 15 fps	36–108 mm (3×) f/2.8–4.9	DIGIC	CF	NB-1L	87.0 × 57.0 × 27.8	185 g		
430	S410	450	PC1086	9 Feb 2004	4.0 MP; 2272×1704; 1/1.8"	320×240 15 fps	36–108 mm (3×) f/2.8–4.9	DIGIC	CF	NB-1L	87.0 × 57.0 × 27.8	185 g		Introduce USB 1.1; added features and faster software
500	S500	500	PC1084	9 Feb 2004	5.0 MP; 2592×1944; 1/1.8"	640×480 10 fps 320×240 15 fps	36–108 mm (3×) f/2.8–4.9	DIGIC	CF	NB-1L	87.0 × 57.0 × 27.8	185 g		IXY Digital 500 White Limited: 10,000 units sold in Japan, June 2004

==== IXUS 400 ====
The Canon Digital IXUS 400 (PowerShot ELPH S400 in North America and IXY Digital 400 in Japan) featured:

- Maximum resolution: 2272 × 1704 (3.8 megapixels)
- Image ratio 4:3
- Memory Format Compact Flash
- ISO 50–400
- 35 mm equivalent: 36 mm–108 mm
- Aperture f/2.8–f/4.9
- Battery NB-1LH, 3.7 V 840 mAh lithium-ion rechargeable

The internal wiring of the CCD can become disconnected in high-temperature or high-humidity environments. Canon issued a recall in October 2006. The damaged CCD displays purple or blueish, distorted or possibly no image at all. The menu and pictures taken prior to the CCD disconnect will still display normally.

The camera also incorrectly reports a problem with the memory card (Memory Card Error message). This problem can be temporarily overcome by removing both the main battery as well as the small internal battery. Canon has acknowledged this issue, and formerly repaired free of charge.

==== IXUS 430 ====
The Canon Digital IXUS 430 is (PowerShot ELPH S410 in North America and IXY Digital 450 in Japan) featured 4.0 megapixels, 3x zoom lens, and i3 minute videos with sound.

There has been a Service Notice by Canon stating that the vendor supplied CCD image sensor used in this camera can cause a malfunction. The affected cameras (s410) show the symptoms such as a corrupted image, lines going across the LCD screen, lack of color of the image produced, or no image produced. Shots by the camera will also display these symptoms. In Canon's service notice they also stated the following: "Effective immediately, and regardless of warranty status, Canon will repair, free of charge, products exhibiting the above-mentioned malfunction if the malfunction is caused by the CCD image sensor. Canon will also cover the cost of shipping and handling in connection with this repair."

=== IXUS/ELPH/IXY cameras using SD storage ===
The PowerShot Digital ELPH using SD had SDxxx or SDxxxx model number prior to 2011 models' introduction.

Digital IXUS	PowerShot Digital ELPH	IXY Digital	Canon model	Release date	Sensor res., size	Video recording	Lens (35 mm equiv.) aperture	Optical zoom	Digital zoom	Image processor	LCD screen size, pixels	Memory	Battery	Dimensions W×H×D (mm)	Weight (-batt.)	Photo	Notes
II	SD100	30	PC1035	2 May 2003	3.2 MP 2048×1536; 1/2.7"	640×480 15 fps	35–70 mm f/2.8–3.9	2×	3.2×	DIGIC	1.5"; 118,000	SD, MMC	NB-3L	85.0 × 56.0 × 23.9	165 g		Introduce SD card storage
IIs	SD110	30a	PC1085	9 Feb 2004	3.2 MP 2048×1536; 1/2.7"	640×480 15 fps	35–70 mm f/2.8–3.9	2×	3.2×	DIGIC	1.5"; 118,000	SD, MMC	NB-3L	85.0 × 56.0 × 23.9	165 g		
30	SD200	40	PC1102	21 Sep 2004	3.2 MP 2048×1536; 1/2.5"	640×480 30 fps 320×240 60 fps	35–105 mm f/2.8–4.9	3×	3.6×	DIGIC II	2.0"; 118,000	SD, MMC	NB-4L	85.8 × 53.4 × 21.1	115 g		Introduce DIGIC II image processor
40	SD300	50	PC1101	21 Sep 2004	4.0 MP 2272×1704; 1/2.5"	640×480 30 fps 320×240 60 fps	35–105 mm f/2.8–4.9	3×	3.6×	DIGIC II	2.0"; 118,000	SD, MMC	NB-4L	86.0 × 53.0 × 20.7	130 g		
50	SD400	55	PC1150	17 Feb 2005	5.0 MP 2592×1944; 1/2.5"	640×480 30 fps 320×240 60 fps	35–105 mm f/2.8–4.9	3×	4×	DIGIC II	2.0"; 118,000	SD, MMC	NB-4L	86.0 × 53.0 × 20.7	130 g		
700	SD500	600	PC1114	17 Feb 2005	7.1 MP 3072×2304; 1/1.8"	640×480 30 fps 320×240 60 fps	37–111 mm f/2.8–4.9	3×	4×	DIGIC II	2.0"; 118,000	SD, MMC	NB-3L	85.6 × 57.0 × 26.5	170 g		Introduce USB 2.0
55	SD450	60	PC1158	22 Aug 2005	5.0 MP 2592×1944; 1/2.5"	640×480 30 fps 320×240 60 fps	35–105 mm f/2.8–4.9	3×	4×	DIGIC II	2.5"; 115,000	SD, MMC	NB-4L	86.0 × 53.5 × 21.6	140 g		Wide-angle viewable LCD; feature 9,999 images stored to one folder
750	SD550	700	PC1169	22 Aug 2005	7.1 MP 3072×2304; 1/1.8"	640×480 30 fps 320×240 60 fps	37–111 mm f/2.8–4.9	3×	4×	DIGIC II	2.5"; 115,000	SD, MMC	NB-3L	89.5 × 57.0 × 27.4	170 g		
Wireless	SD430	Wireless	PC1190	25 Oct 2005	5.0 MP 2592×1944; 1/2.5"	640×480 30 fps 320×240 60 fps	35–105 mm f/2.8–4.9	3×	4×	DIGIC II	2.0", 118,000	SD, MMC	NB-4L	99.0 × 54.4 × 21.7	130 g		11b Wi-Fi transfer
60	SD600	70	PC1193	21 Feb 2006	6.0 MP 2816×2112; 1/2.5"	640×480 30 fps 320×240 60 fps	35–105 mm f/2.8–4.9	3×	4×	DIGIC II	2.5"; 173,000	SD, MMC	NB-4L	86.0 × 53.5 × 21.7	140 g	|	
65	SD630	80	PC1147	21 Feb 2006	6.0 MP 2816×2112; 1/2.5"	640×480 30 fps 320×240 60 fps	35–105 mm f/2.8–4.9	3×	4×	DIGIC II	3.0"; 173,000	SD, MMC	NB-4L	90.3 × 56.8 × 20.2	145 g		Introduce 3" LCD and no viewfinder
800 IS	SD700 IS	800 IS	PC1176	21 Feb 2006	6.0 MP 2816×2112; 1/2.5"	640×480 30 fps 320×240 60 fps	35–140 mm f/2.8–5.5	4×	4×	DIGIC II	2.5"; 173,000	SD, MMC	NB-5L	90.4 × 56.5 × 26.4	165 g		Introduce Image stabilisation
850 IS	SD800 IS	900 IS	PC1209	14 Sep 2006	7.1 MP 3072×2304; 1/2.5"	640×480 30 fps 320×240 60 fps	28–105 mm f/2.8–5.8	3.8×	4×	DIGIC III	2.5"; 207,000	SD, SDHC, MMC	NB-5L	89.5 × 58.0 × 25.1	150 g		Introduce DIGIC III image processor, ISO 1600, face detection, SDHC memory card
900 Ti	SD900	1000	PC1206	14 Sep 2006	10.0 MP 3648×2736; 1/1.8"	1024×768 15 fps 640×480 30 fps	37–111 mm f/2.8–4.9	3×	4×	DIGIC III	2.5"; 230,000	SD, SDHC, MMC	NB-5L	91.2 × 59.6 × 28.2	165 g		Titanium case, ISO 3200 at 2 MP
70	SD1000	10	PC1228	22 Feb 2007	7.1 MP 3072×2304; 1/2.5"	640×480 30 fps 320×240 60 fps	35–105 mm f/2.8–4.9	3×	4×	DIGIC III	2.5"; 230,000	SD, SDHC, MMC	NB-4L	85.9 × 53.5 × 19.4	125 g		Red eye correction, black/silver case options (black version tribute to the original IXUS/IXY/ELPH APS camera introduced in 1996)
75	SD750	90	PC1227	22 Feb 2007	7.1 MP 3072×2304; 1/2.5"	640×480 30 fps 320×240 60 fps	35–105 mm f/2.8–4.9	3×	4×	DIGIC III	3.0"; 230,000	SD, SDHC, MMC	NB-4L	91.6 × 56.8 × 19.6	130 g		
950 IS	SD850 IS	810 IS	PC1235	7 May 2007	8.0 MP 3264×2448; 1/2.5"	640×480 30 fps 320×240 60 fps	35–140 mm f/2.8–5.5	4×	4×	DIGIC III	2.5"; 230,000	SD, SDHC, MMC, MMC+, HC MMC+	NB-5L	90.4 × 56.5 × 26.4	165 g		
860 IS	SD870 IS	910 IS	PC1249	20 Aug 2007	8.0 MP 3264×2448; 1/2.5"	640×480 30 fps	28–105 mm f/2.8–5.8	3.8×	4×	DIGIC III	3.0"; 230,000	SD, SDHC, MMC, MMC+, HC MMC+	NB-5L	92.6 × 58.8 × 25.9	155 g		Black/silver case options
960 IS	SD950 IS	2000 IS	PC1248	20 Aug 2007	12.1 MP 4000×3000; 1/1.7"	1024×768 15 fps 640×480 30 fps	36–133 mm f/2.8–5.8	3.7×	4×	DIGIC III	2.5"; 230,000	SD, SDHC, MMC, MMC+, HC MMC+	NB-5L	95.9 × 59.9 × 27.6	165 g		Titanium case
80/82 IS	SD1100 IS	20 IS	PC1271	24 Jan 2008	8.0 MP 3264×2448; 1/2.5"	640×480 30 fps	38–114 mm f/2.8–4.9	3×	4×	DIGIC III	2.5"; 230,000	SD, SDHC, MMC, MMC+, HC MMC+	NB-4L	86.8 × 54.8 × 22.0	125 g		Five colour options: Rhythm & Blue, Swing Silver, Pink Melody, Bohemian Brown, Golden Tone; First entry-level IXUS/IXY/ELPH with image stabilisation
85 IS	SD770 IS	25 IS	PC1262	13 Mar 2008	10.0 MP 3648×2736; 1/2.3"	640×480 30 fps	35–105 mm f/2.8–4.9	3×	4×	DIGIC III	2.5"; 230,000	SD, SDHC, MMC, MMC+, HC MMC+	NB-6L	86.0 × 54.0 × 20.4	130 g		Black/silver case options
90 IS	SD790 IS	95 IS	PC1261	13 Mar 2008	10.0 MP 3648×2736; 1/2.3"	640×480 30 fps	35–105 mm f/2.8–4.9	3×	4×	DIGIC III	3.0"; 230,000	SD, SDHC, MMC, MMC+, HC MMC+	NB-5L	91.6 × 56.8 × 20.9	155 g		
970 IS	SD890 IS	820 IS	PC1266	13 Mar 2008	10.0 MP 3648×2736; 1/2.3"	640×480 30 fps	37–185 mm f/3.2–5.7	5×	4×	DIGIC III	2.5"; 230,000	SD, SDHC, MMC, MMC+, HC MMC+	NB-5L	95.4 × 57.3 × 27.4	155 g		Introduce 5× zoom
870 IS	SD880 IS	920 IS	PC1308	17 Sep 2008	10.0 MP 3648×2736; 1/2.3"	640×480 30 fps	28–112 mm f/2.8–5.8	4×	4×	DIGIC 4	3.0"; 230,000	SD, SDHC, MMC, MMC+, HC MMC+	NB-5L	93.8 × 56.8 × 23.6	155 g		DIGIC 4 image processor; gold/silver case options
980 IS	SD990 IS	3000 IS	PC1332	17 Sep 2008	14.7 MP 4416×3312; 1/1.7"	640×480 30 fps	36–133 mm f/2.8–5.8	3.7×	4×	DIGIC 4	2.5"; 230,000	SD, SDHC, MMC, MMC+, HC MMC+	NB-5L	96.7 × 62.2 × 27.9	160 g		Introduce basic manual control aperture/shutter priority
95 IS	SD1200 IS	110 IS	PC1355	18 Feb 2009	10.0 MP 3648×2736; 1/2.3"	640×480 30 fps	35–105 mm f/2.8–4.9	3×	4×	DIGIC 4	2.5"; 230,000	SD, SDHC, MMC, MMC+, HC MMC+	NB-6L	88.5 × 54.8 × 21.8	120 g		
100 IS	SD780 IS	210 IS	PC1353	18 Feb 2009	12.1 MP 4000×3000; 1/2.3"	720p 30 fps	33–100 mm f/3.2–5.8	3×	4×	DIGIC 4	2.5"; 230,000	SD, SDHC, MMC, MMC+, HC MMC+	NB-4L	87.0 × 54.5 × 18.4	115 g		720p HD video recording and HDMI connector
110 IS	SD960 IS	510 IS	PC1356	18 Feb 2009	12.1 MP 4000×3000; 1/2.3"	720p 30 fps	28–112 mm f/2.8–5.8	4×	4×	DIGIC 4	2.8" 16:9; 230,000	SD, SDHC, MMC, MMC+, HC MMC+	NB-4L	97.9 × 54.1 × 22.1	145 g		Introduce wide screen and redesigned simplified controls; feature 720p HD video recording and HDMI connector
990 IS	SD970 IS	830 IS	PC1357	18 Feb 2009	12.1 MP 4000×3000; 1/2.3"	720p 30 fps	37–185 mm f/3.2–5.7	5×	4×	DIGIC 4	3.0"; 461,000	SD, SDHC, MMC, MMC+, HC MMC+	NB-5L	94.8 × 56.8 × 26.3	160 g		720p HD video recording and HDMI connector
120 IS	SD940 IS	220 IS	PC1430	19 Aug 2009	12.1 MP 4000×3000; 1/2.3"	720p 30 fps	28–112 mm f/2.8–5.9	4×	4×	DIGIC 4	2.7"; 230,000	SD, SDHC, MMC, MMC+, HC MMC+	NB-4L	89.5 × 54.9 × 20.0	120 g		
200 IS	SD980 IS	930 IS	PC1437	19 Aug 2009	12.1 MP 4000×3000; 1/2.3"	720p 30 fps	24–120 mm f/2.8–5.9	5×	4×	DIGIC 4	3.0" 16:9; 230,000 touch	SD, SDHC, MMC, MMC+, HC MMC+	NB-6L	99.9 × 53.4 × 22.9	130 g		Introduce 24 mm wide-angle lens and touch-screen
105	SD1300 IS	200F	PC1469	8 Feb 2010	12.1 MP 4000×3000; 1/2.3"	640×480 30 fps	28–112 mm f/2.8–5.9	4×	4×	DIGIC 4	2.7"; 230,000	SD, SDHC, SDXC, MMC, MMC+, HC MMC+	NB-6L	90.5 × 55.8 × 21.2	140 g		
130	SD1400 IS	400F	PC1472	8 Feb 2010	14.1 MP 4320×3240; 1/2.3"	720p 30 fps	28–112 mm f/2.8–5.9	4×	4×	DIGIC 4	2.7"; 230,000	SD, SDHC, SDXC, MMC, MMC+, HC MMC+	NB-4L	92.2 × 56.1 × 17.8	133 g		
210	SD3500 IS	10S	PC1467	8 Feb 2010	14.1 MP 4320×3240; 1/2.3"	720p 30 fps	24–120 mm f/2.8–5.9	5×	4×	DIGIC 4	3.5" 16:9; 460,000 touch	SD, SDHC, SDXC, MMC, MMC+, HC MMC+	NB-6L	99.3 × 55.7 × 22.0	160 g		
300 HS	SD4000 IS	30S	PC1473	12 May 2010	10.0 MP 3648×2736; 1/2.3"	720p 30 fps 320×240 240 fps	28–105 mm f/2.0–5.3	3.8×	4×	DIGIC 4	3.0" 16:9; 230,000	SD, SDHC, SDXC, MMC, MMC+, HC MMC+	NB-6L	100.0 × 54.1 × 23.6	175 g		First Digital IXUS with CMOS
1000 HS	SD4500 IS	50S		19 Aug 2010	10.0 MP 3648×2736; 1/2.3"	1080p 24 fps 720p 30 fps 320×240 240 fps	36–360 mm f/3.4–5.6	10×	4×	DIGIC 4	3.0" 16:9; 230,000	SD, SDHC, SDXC, MMC, MMC+, HC MMC+	NB-9L	101.3 × 58.5 × 22.3	190 g	SD4500IS	10th anniversary edition Introduced Full-HD (1080p) video recording First IXUS with stereo microphone
310 HS	500 HS	31S		6 Feb 2011	12.1 MP 4000×3000; 1/2.3"	1080p 24 fps 720p 30 fps 640×480 120 fps 320×240 240 fps	24–105 mm f/2.0–5.8	4.4×	4×	DIGIC 4	3.2" 16:9; 461,000 touch	SD, SDHC, SDXC, MMC, MMC+, HC MMC+	NB-L	100.6 × 55.4 × 25.0	185 g		
220 HS	300 HS	410F	PC1591	6 Feb 2011	12.1 MP 4000×3000; 1/2.3"	1080p 24 fps 720p 30 fps 640×480 120 fps 320×240 240 fps	24–120 mm f/2.7–5.9	5×	4×	DIGIC 4	2.7"; 230,000	SD, SDHC, SDXC, MMC, MMC+, HC MMC+	NB-4L	92.2 × 55.9 × 19.5	141 g		
115 HS	100 HS	210F		6 Feb 2011	12.1 MP 4000×3000; 1/2.3"	1080p 24 fps 720p 30 fps 640×480 120 fps 320×240 240 fps	28–112 mm f/2.8–5.9	4×	4×	DIGIC 4	3.0"; 230,000	SD, SDHC, SDXC, MMC, MMC+, HC MMC+	NB-4L	93.1 × 55.8 × 19.9	140 g	A IXUS 115 HS with its lens extended	
1100 HS	510 HS	51S		23 Aug 2011	12.1 MP 4000×3000; 1/2.3"	1080p 24 fps 720p 30 fps 640×480 120 fps 320×240 240 fps	28–336 mm f/3.4–5.9	12×	4×	DIGIC 4	3.2" 16:9; 461,000 touch	SD, SDHC, SDXC	NB-9L	99.0 × 58.9 × 21.9	206 g		
230 HS	310 HS	600F		23 Aug 2011	12.1 MP 4000×3000; 1/2.3"	1080p 24 fps 720p 30 fps 640×480 120 fps 320×240 240 fps	28–224 mm f/3.0–5.9	8×	4×	DIGIC 4	3.0"; 461,000	SD, SDHC, SDXC	NB-4L	95.8 × 56.8 × 22.1	140 g		
500 HS	520 HS	3		9 January 2012	10.1 MP effective 3648×2736; 1/2.3" 16.1 MP	1080p 24 fps 720p 30 fps 640×480 120 fps 320×240 240 fps	28–336 mm f/3.4–5.6	12×	4×	DIGIC 5	3.0"; 461,000	microSD, microSDHC, microSDXC	NB-9L	87.1 × 53.9 × 19.2	155 g	IXY 3	Uses microSD memory cards
125 HS	110 HS	220F	PC1733	9 January 2012	16.1 MP 4608×3456; 1/2.3"	1080p 24 fps 720p 30 fps 640×480 120 fps 320×240 240 fps	24–120 mm f/2.7–5.9	5×	4×	DIGIC 5	3.0"; 461,000	SD, SDHC, SDXC	NB-11L	93.2 × 57.0 × 20.0	135 g		
510 HS	530 HS	1		7 February 2012	10.1 MP effective 3648×2736; 1/2.3" 16.1 MP	1080p 24 fps 720p 30 fps 640×480 120 fps 320×240 240 fps	28–336 mm f/3.4–5.6	12×	4×	DIGIC 5	3.2" 16:9; 461,000 touch	microSD, microSDHC, microSDXC	NB-9L	85.8 × 53.5 × 19.8	163 g		Wi-Fi (IEEE802.11b/g/n, 2.4 GHz only)
240 HS	320 HS	420F		7 February 2012	16.1 MP 4608×3456; 1/2.3"	1080p 24 fps 720p 30 fps 640×480 120 fps 320×240 240 fps	24–120 mm f/2.7–5.9	5×	4×	DIGIC 5	3.2" 16:9; 461,000 touch	SD, SDHC, SDXC	NB-11L	93.5 × 56.8 × 20.8	145 g		Wi-Fi (IEEE802.11b/g/n, 2.4 GHz only)
245 HS	-	430F		September 2012	16.1 MP 4608×3456; 1/2.3"	1080p 24 fps 720p 30 fps 640×480 120 fps 320×240 240 fps	24–120 mm f/2.7–5.9	5×	4×	DIGIC 5	3.2" 16:9; 461,000 touch	SD, SDHC, SDXC	NB-11L	93.5 × 56.8 × 20.8	145 g		Wi-Fi; Japan and Asia only
255 HS	330 HS	610F		29 January 2013	12.1 MP; 1/2.3"	1080p 24 fps 720p 30 fps 640×480 120 fps 320×240 240 fps	24–240 mm f/3.0–6.9	10×	4×	DIGIC 5	3.0"; 461,000	SD, SDHC, SDXC	NB-4L	97.2 × 56.4 × 22.5	144 g		Wi-Fi (IEEE802.11b/g/n, 2.4 GHz only)
132	115 IS	90F		29 January 2013	16.0 MP; 1/2.3"	1080p 24 fps 720p 30 fps 640×480 120 fps 320×240 240 fps	28–224 mm f/3.2–6.9	8×	4×	DIGIC 4	2.7"; 230,000	SD, SDHC, SDXC	NB-11L	92.9 × 52.4 × 21.6	133 g		
135	120 IS	100F		29 January 2013	16.0 MP; 1/2.3"	720p 25 fps 640×480 30 fps	28–224 mm f/3.2–6.9	8×	4×	DIGIC 4	2.7"; 230,000	SD, SDHC, SDXC	NB-11L	92.9 × 52.4 × 21.6	134 g		Wi-Fi (IEEE802.11b/g/n, 2.4 GHz only)
140	130 IS	110F		29 January 2013	12.1 MP; 1/2.3"	720p 25 fps 640×480 30 fps	28–224 mm f/3.2–6.9	8×	4×	DIGIC 4	3.0"; 460,000	SD, SDHC, SDXC	NB-11L	95.4 × 56.0 × 20.6	133 g		Wi-Fi (IEEE802.11b/g/n, 2.4 GHz only)
-	-	620F		August 2013	12.1 MP; 1/2.3"	1080p 30 fps	24–240 mm f/3.0–6.9	10×	4×	DIGIC 5	3.0"; 460,000	SD, SDHC, SDXC	NB-4L	97.2 × 56.4 × 22.5	144 g		Wi-Fi; Japan only
265 HS	340 HS	630		6 January 2014	16.0 MP; 1/2.3"	1080p 30 fps	25–300 mm f/3.6–7.0	12×	4×	DIGIC 4+	3.0"; 461,000	SD, SDHC, SDXC	NB-11LH	100 × 58 × 22	147 g		Wi-Fi
145	135	120		12 February 2014	16.0 MP; 1/2.3"	720p 25 fps 640×480 30 fps	28–224 mm f/3.2–6.9	8×	4×	DIGIC 4+	2.7"; 230,000	SD, SDHC, SDXC	NB-11L	95 × 54 × 22	127 g		
150	140 IS	130		12 February 2014	16.0 MP; 1/2.3"	720p 25 fps 640×480 30 fps	28–224 mm f/3.2–6.9	8×	4×	DIGIC 4+	2.7"; 230,000	SD, SDHC, SDXC	NB-11L	95 × 54 × 22	127 g		
155	150 IS	140		12 February 2014	20.0 MP 5152x3864 1/2.3"	720p 25 fps 640×480 30 fps	24–240 mm f/3.0–6.9	10×	4×	DIGIC 4+	2.7"; 230,000	SD, SDHC, SDXC	NB-11LH	95 × 57 × 24	142 g		
160	160	150		5 January 2015	20.0 MP; 1/2.3"	720p 25 fps 640×480 30 fps	28–224 mm f/3.2–6.9	8×	4×	DIGIC 4+	2.7"; 230,000	SD, SDHC, SDXC	NB-11L	95.2 × 54.3 × 22.1	127 g		IS digital only
165	-	160		5 January 2015	20.0 MP; 1/2.3"	720p 25 fps 640×480 30 fps	28–224 mm f/3.2–6.9	8×	4×	DIGIC 4+	2.7"; 230,000	SD, SDHC, SDXC	NB-11L	95.2 × 54.3 × 22.1	128 g		
170	170 IS	170		5 January 2015	20.0 MP; 1/2.3"	720p 25 fps 640×480 30 fps	25–300 mm f/3.6–7.0	12×	4×	DIGIC 4+	2.7"; 230,000	SD, SDHC, SDXC	NB-11LH	99.6 × 57.6 × 22.6	141 g		
275 HS	350 HS	640		April 2015	20.2 MP 1/2.3"	1080p 30 fps	25–300 mm f/3.6–7.0	12×	4×	DIGIC 4+	3.0" 461,000	SD, SDHC, SDXC	NB-11LH	99.6 × 58.0 × 22.8	147 g		Replaces IXUS 265 HS / ELPH 340 HS / IXY 630
175	180	180		5 January 2016	20.0 MP 1/2.3"	720p 25 fps 640×480 30 fps	28–224 mm f/3.2–6.9	8×	4×	DIGIC 4+	2.7" 230,000	SD, SDHC, SDXC	NB-11LH	95.2 × 54.3 × 22.1	126 g		Plastic body (no wifi or NFC)
180	190 IS	190	PC2266	5 January 2016	20.0 MP; 1/2.3"	720p 25 fps 640×480 30 fps	24–240 mm f/3.0–6.9	10×	4×	DIGIC 4+	2.7"; 230,000	SD, SDHC, SDXC	NB-11LH	95.3 × 56.8 × 23.6	138 g		Wifi, NFC, plastic body
285 HS	360 HS	650		5 January 2016	20.2 MP 1/2.3"	1080p 30 fps	25–300 mm f/3.6–7.0	12×	4×	DIGIC 4+	3.0" 461,000	SD, SDHC, SDXC	NB-11LH	99.6 × 58.0 × 22.8	147 g		Replaces IXUS 275 HS / ELPH 350 HS / IXY 640
185	185	200		February 2017	20.0 MP 1/2.3"	720p 25 fps 640×480 30 fps	28–224 mm f/3.2–6.9	8×	4×	DIGIC 4+	2.7" 230,000	SD, SDHC, SDXC	NB-11LH	95.2 × 54.3 × 22.1	126 g		Plastic body (no wifi or NFC)
190	200 IS	210		February 2017	20.0 MP 1/2.3"	720p 25 fps 640×480 30 fps	24–240 mm f/3.0–6.9	10×	4×	DIGIC 4+	2.7" 230,000	SD, SDHC, SDXC	NB-11LH	95.3 × 56.8 × 23.6	137 g		Wifi, NFC, plastic body

=== IXUS i/ELPH SDxx/IXY L Cameras ===
Digital IXUS	PowerShot Digital ELPH	IXY Digital	Canon model	Release date	Sensor res., size	Movie mode	Image processor	Lens (35 mm equiv.) zoom, aperture	Memory	Battery	Dimensions (mm)	Weight (−batt.)	Photo	Notes
i	SD10	L	PC1060	12 Sep 2003	4 MP; 2272×1704; 1/2.5"	320×240 15 fps		39 mm, f/2.8	SD, MMC	NB-3L	90.3 × 47.0 × 18.5	100 g		Several body colors
i^{5}	SD20	L^{2}	PC1108	September 2004	5.0 MP 2592×1944; 1/2.5"	640×480 10 fps 320×240 15 fps	DIGIC	39 mm, f/2.8	SD, MMC	NB-3L	90 × 47 × 19			
i Zoom	SD30	L^{3}	PC1144	September 2005	5.0 MP 2592×1944; 1/2.5"	640×480 10 fps 320×240 20 fps 160x120 15 fps	DIGIC II	38–90 mm (2.4×), f/3.2–5.4	SD, MMC	NB-4L	96 × 45 × 24			
i^{7} Zoom	SD40	L^{4}	PC1205	September 2006	7.1 MP; 3072×2304; 1/2.5"	640×480 30 fps 320×240 60 fps	DIGIC III	38–90 mm (2.4×), f/3.2–5.4	SD, SDHC, MMC	NB-4L	96.1 × 45.1 × 23.9	105 g		ISO 1600, titanium case, face detection, first to use DIGIC III OS, Denim Blue, Steel Grey, Sepia, Pink

== Accessories ==
- IXUS: AW-PS200 all-weather enclosure
- IXUS 330: WP-DC500 waterproof enclosure
- IXUS 400/430/500: WP-DC800 waterproof enclosure
- IXUS i: AW-DC10 all-weather enclosure
- IXUS 50: AW-DC30 all-weather enclosure
- IXUS 55: AW-DC50 all-weather enclosure
- SD700 IS: WP-DC5 waterproof enclosure
- External flash: High-Power Flash HF-DC1

== Known problems ==
A firmware bug exists that can cause the IXUS 400 (and possibly other cameras with the same firmware) to display a "Memory card error" message after the camera has been in use for some time. Contrary to the message, there may not actually be anything wrong with the memory card. Descriptions of the fix recommend simultaneously removing the internal and external batteries to reset the camera. Canon has acknowledged this issue and formerly repaired it free of charge.

A number of camera models across several manufacturers used a Sony CCD that was prone to failure. Canon put out a general recall in late 2005 on affected models and serial numbers. Models from the IXUS range are the v^{3}, II, and IIs. Canon has issued a support advisory stating it will repair affected cameras free of charge. This free repair service for Canon cameras with defective CCD image sensors is gradually being phased out; in the UK, the free service end date for IXUS II cameras was 31 January 2011.

Like all compacts with a zoom lens, cameras in the IXUS range are susceptible to the "lens error" message if the lens is physically unable to zoom in or out. On Canon cameras, this manifests as the E18 error or the message "Lens error, restart camera" on more recent models.

== Sample shots ==
All images here are the original camera JPEG with original Exif information, unmodified except for lossless rotation.

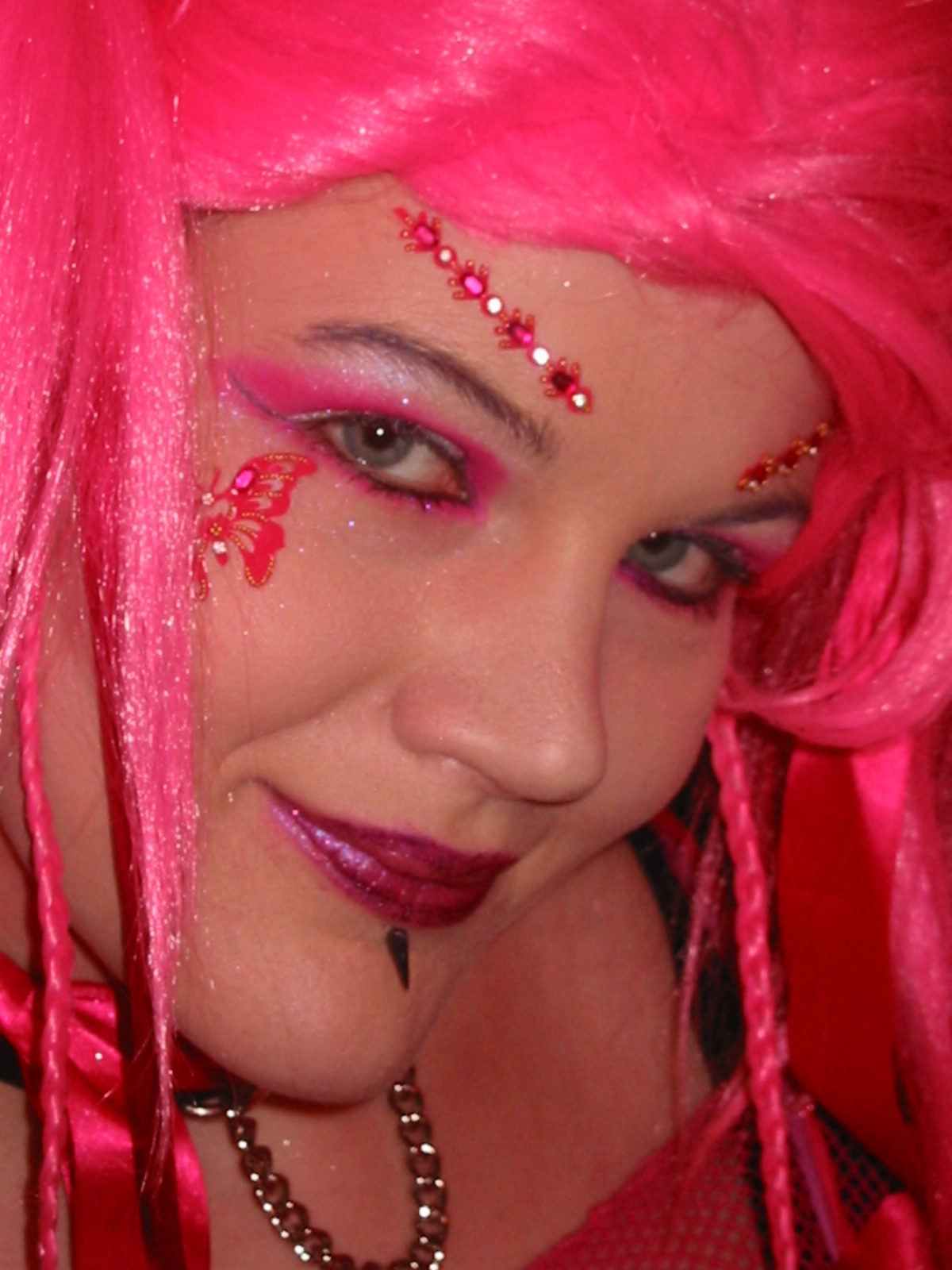
Face close-up with zoom
(PowerShot S110)

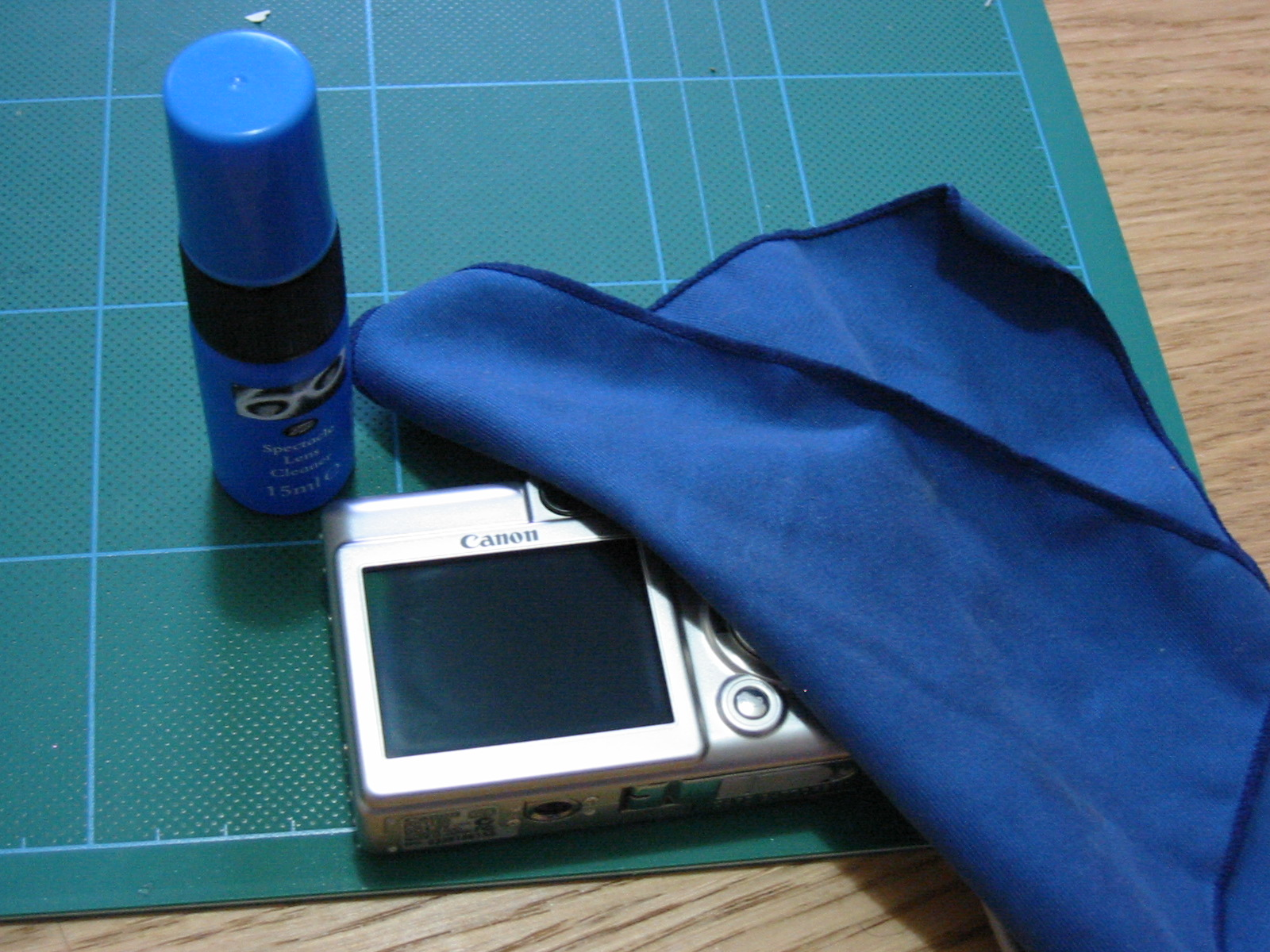
Cleaning a camera LCD
(IXUS 330)

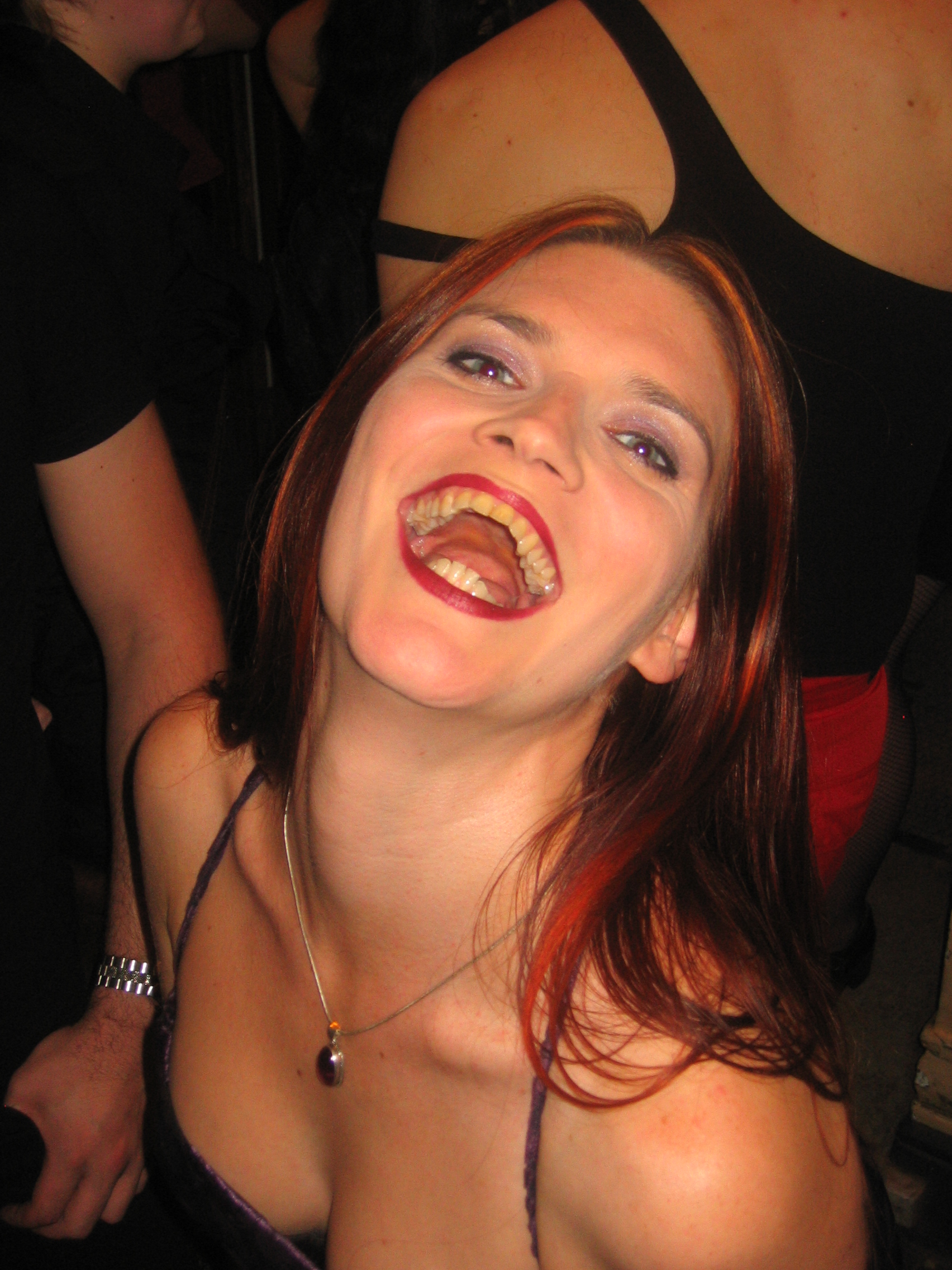
Face, maximum zoom from longer distance, flash
(IXUS 400)

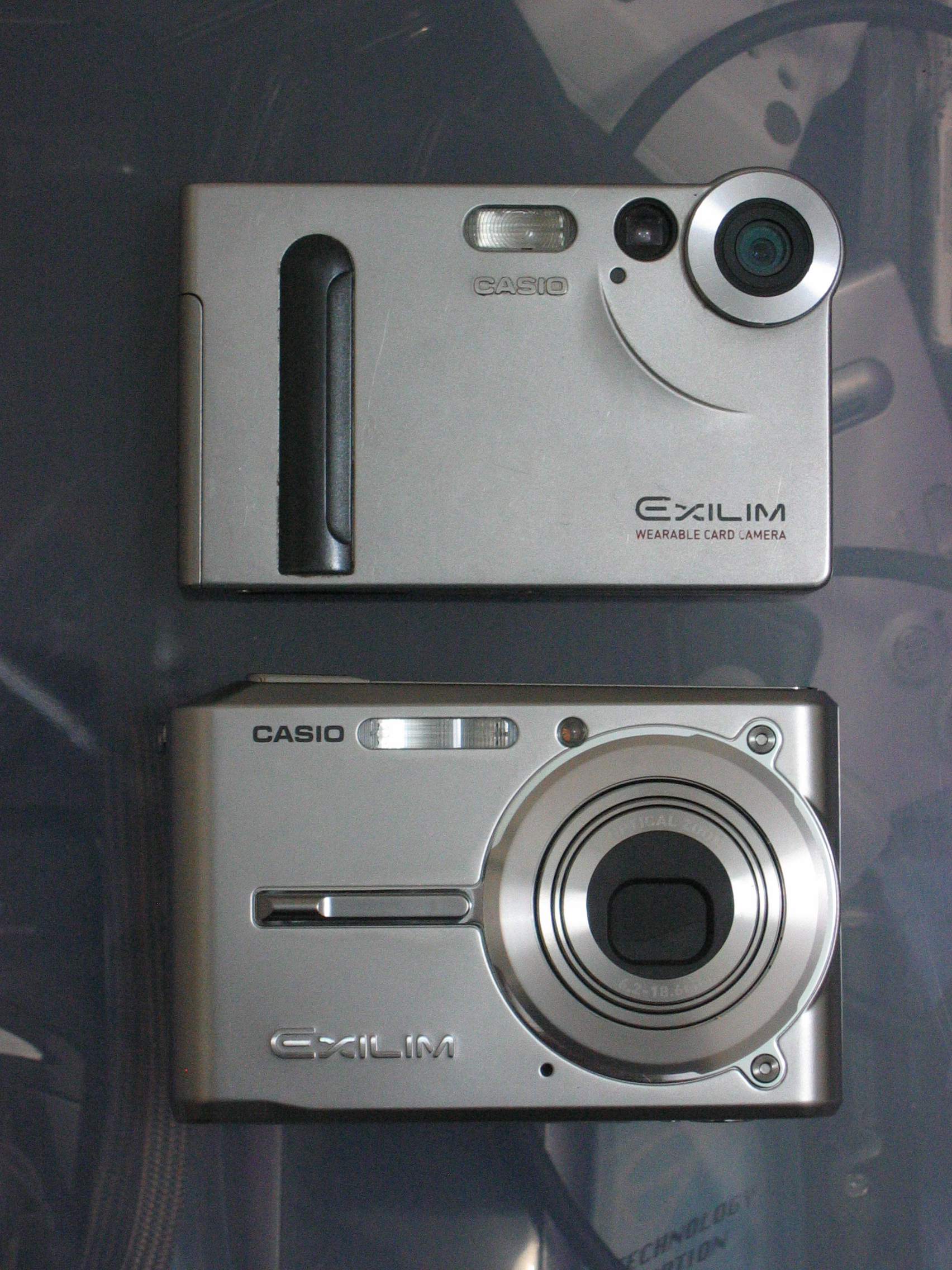
Casio Exilim EX-S1 and EX-S600, no flash
(IXUS 430)

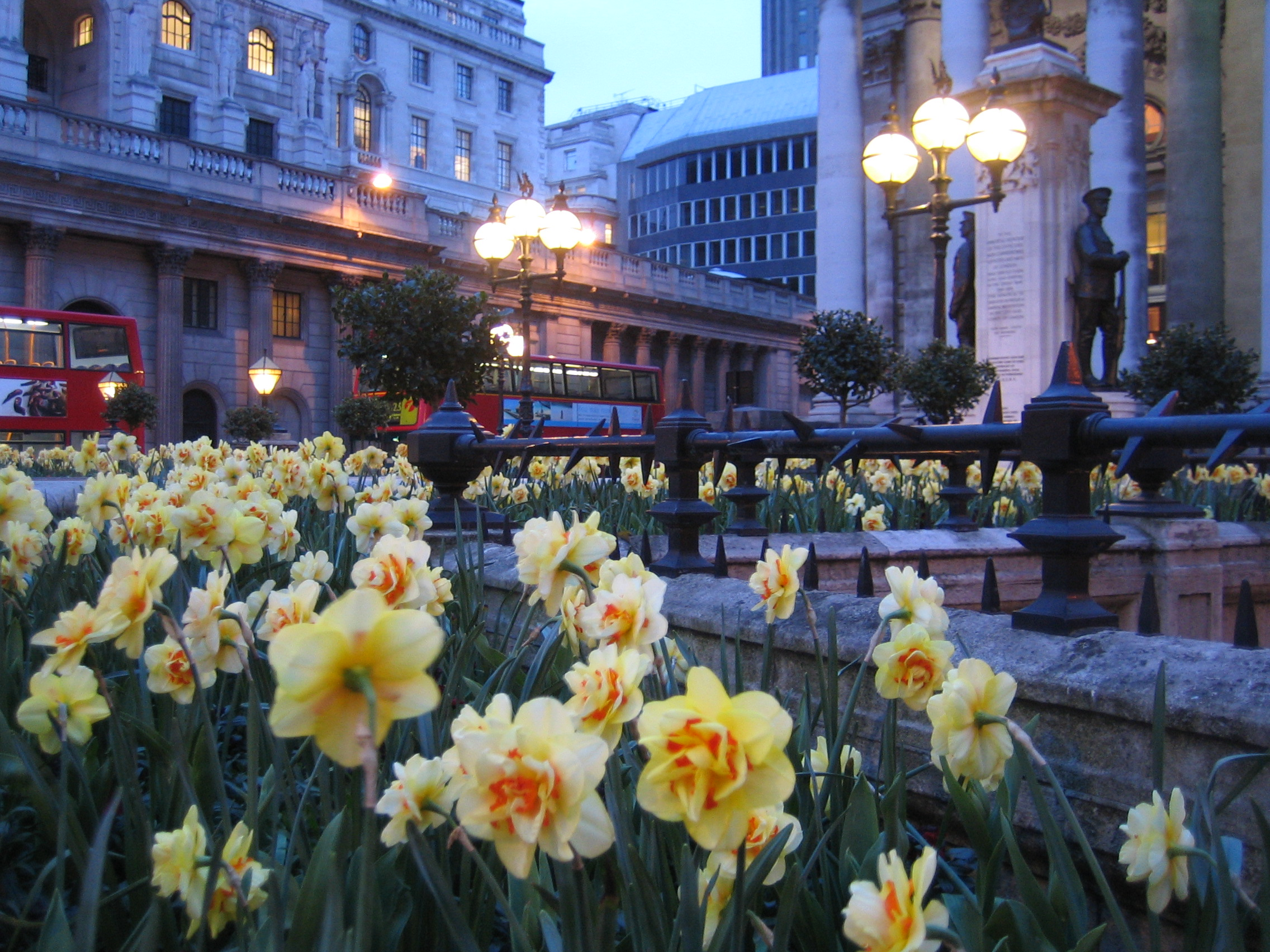
Daffodils at Bank station, London in low light
(IXUS 40)

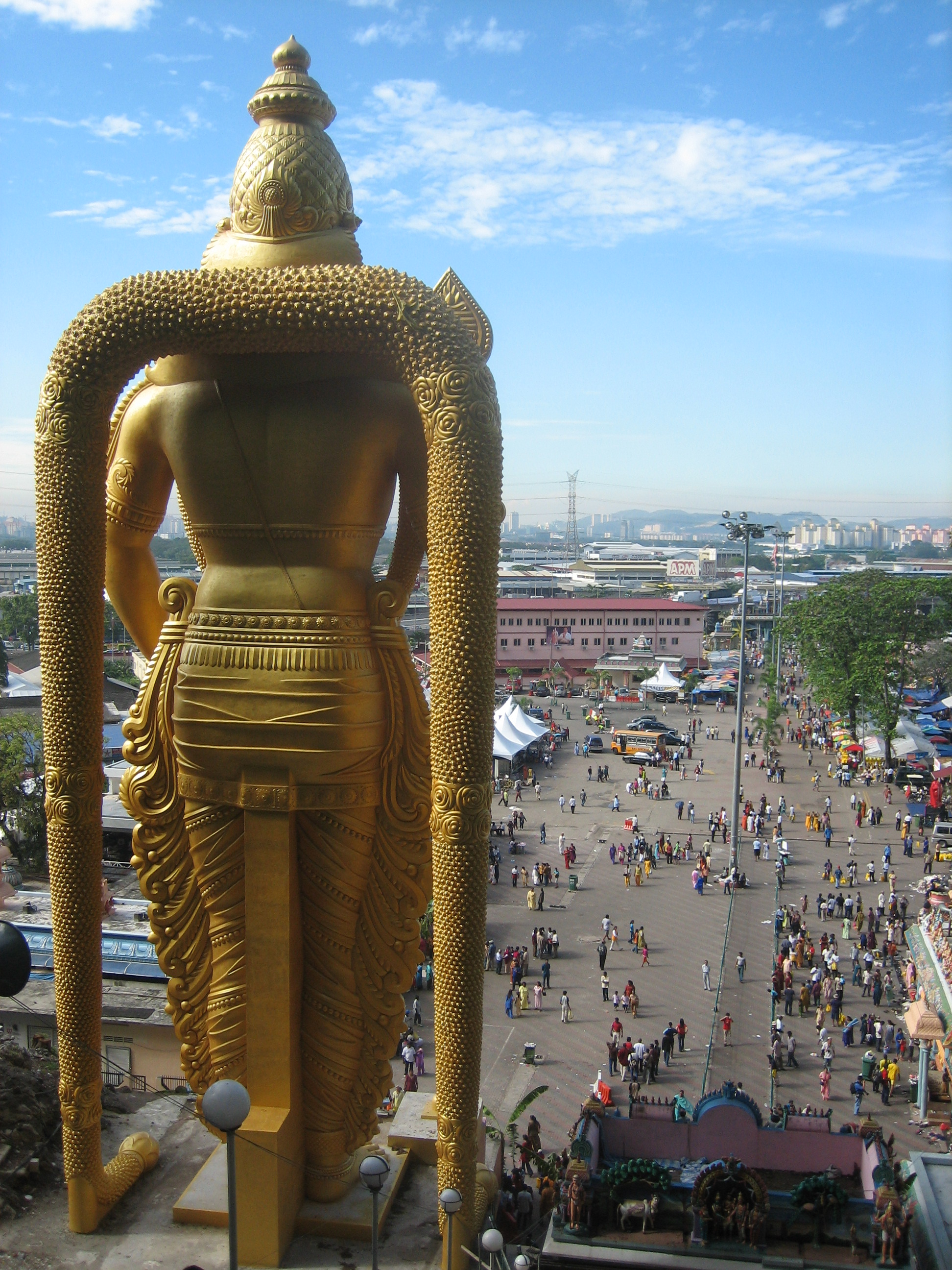
Batu Caves, Malaysia (PowerShot SD400)

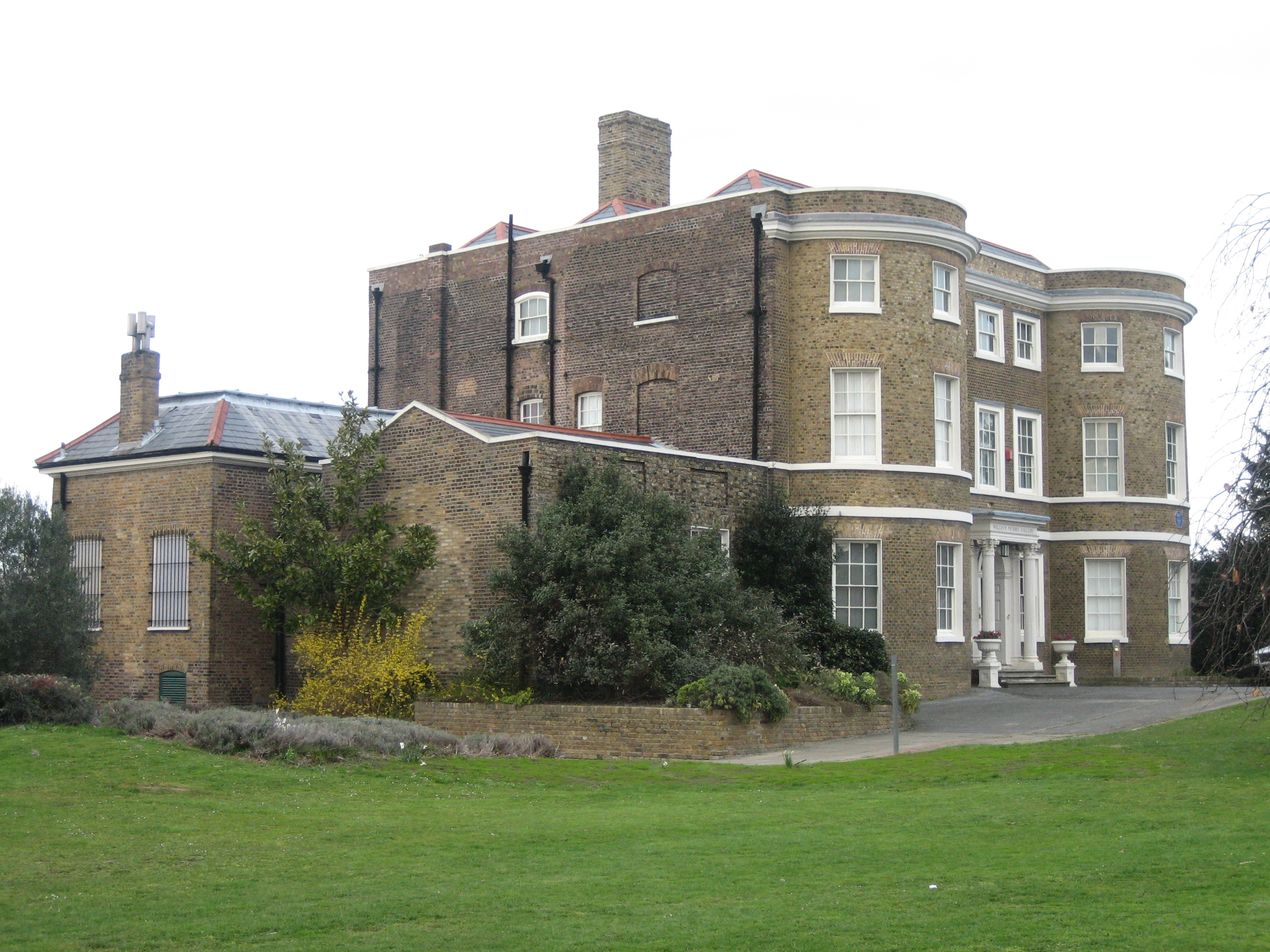
William Morris Gallery, Walthamstow
(IXUS 50)

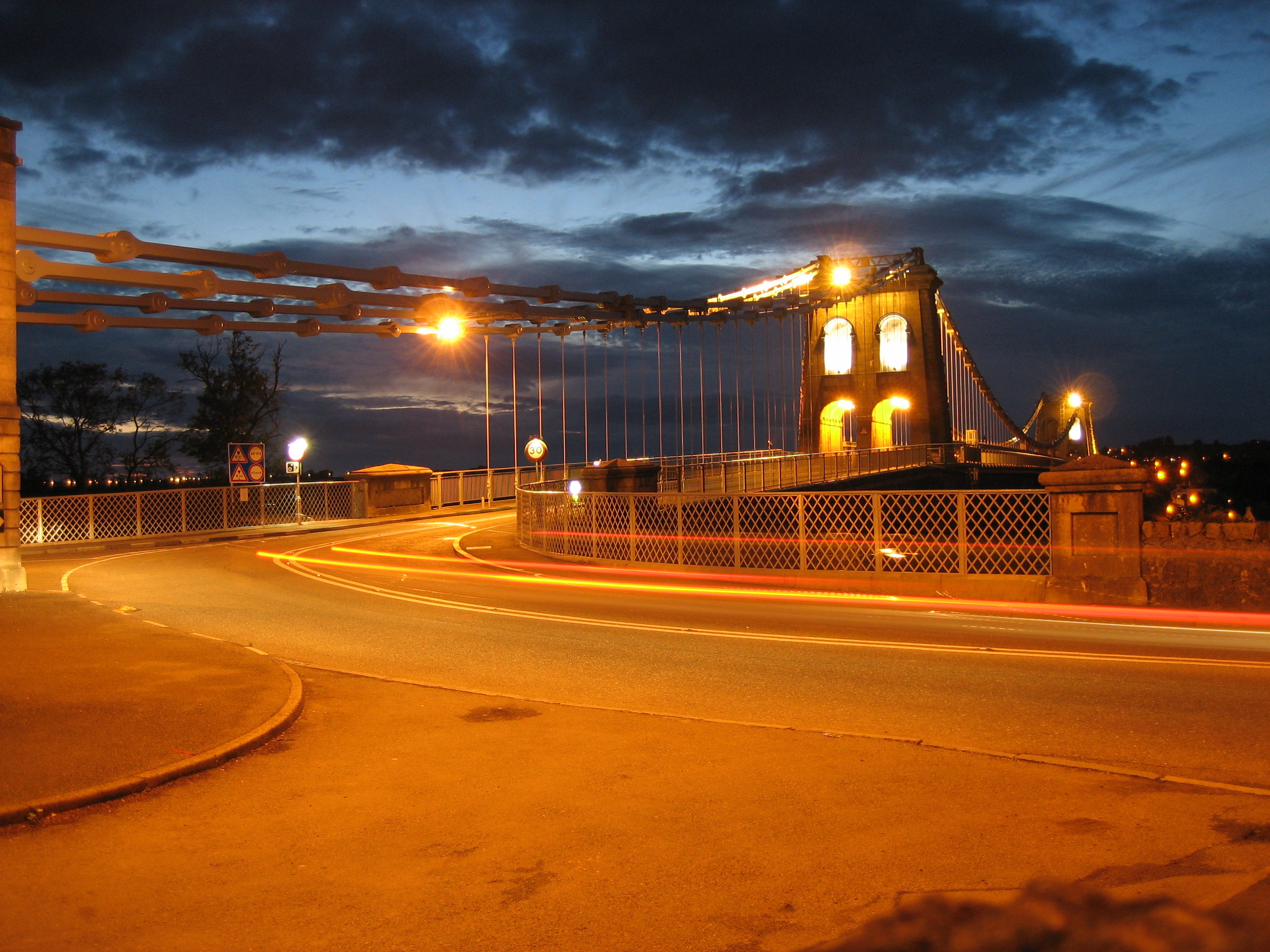
2.5 second exposure of the Menai Suspension Bridge in Wales
(IXUS 55)

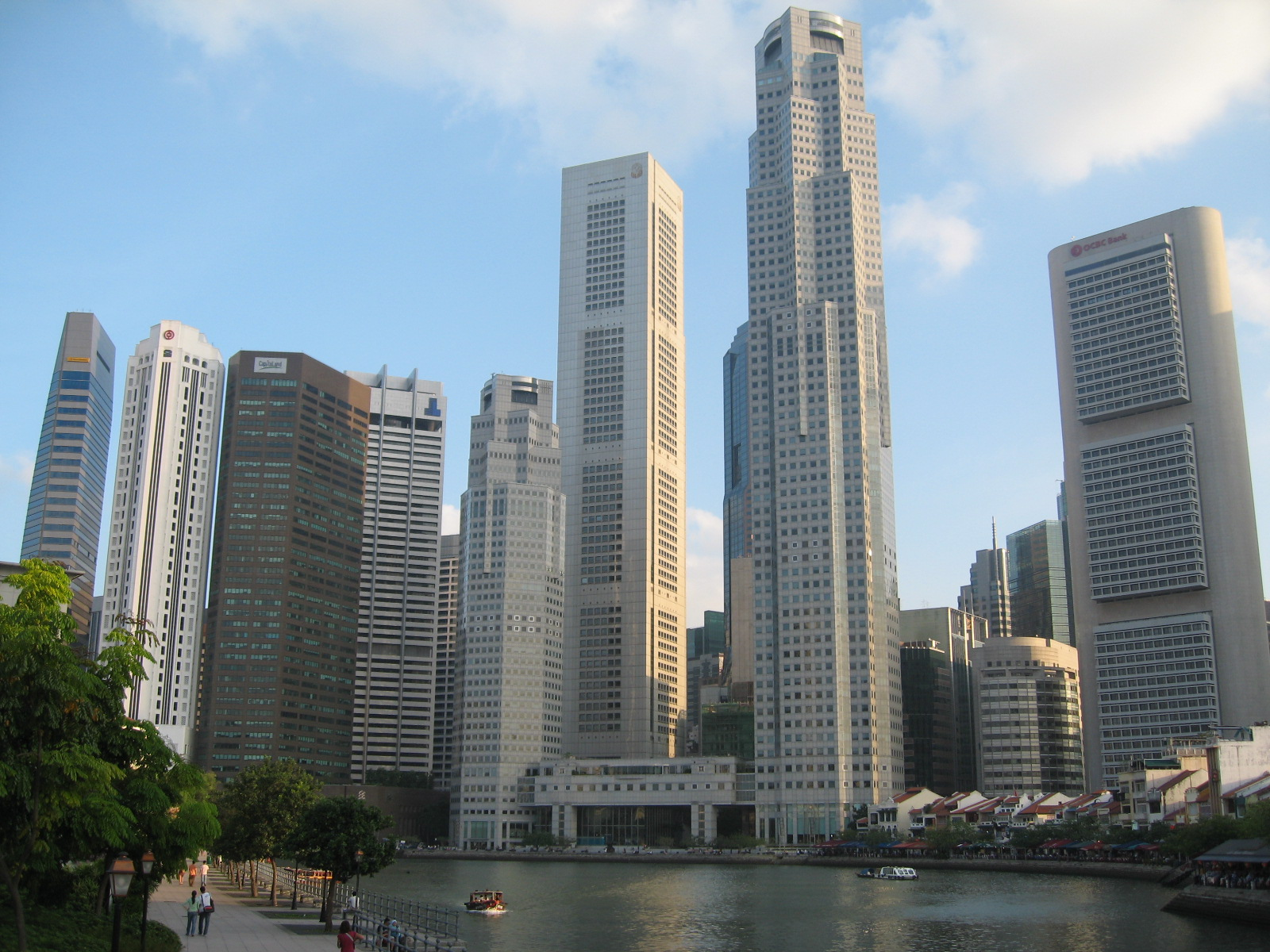
Singapore River, Singapore (IXUS 750)

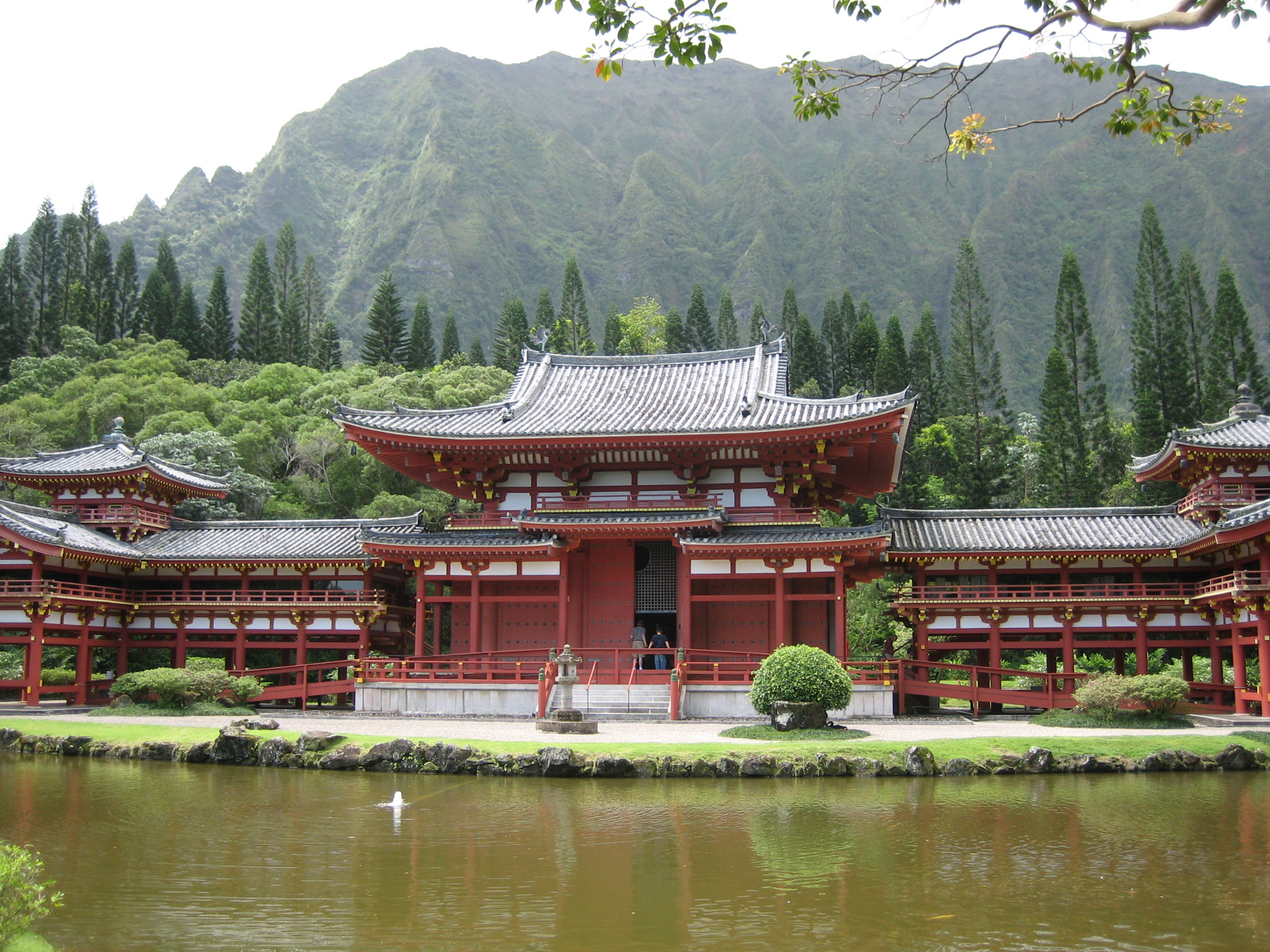
Byodo-In Temple, Kaneohe, Hawaii, United States (IXUS 50)

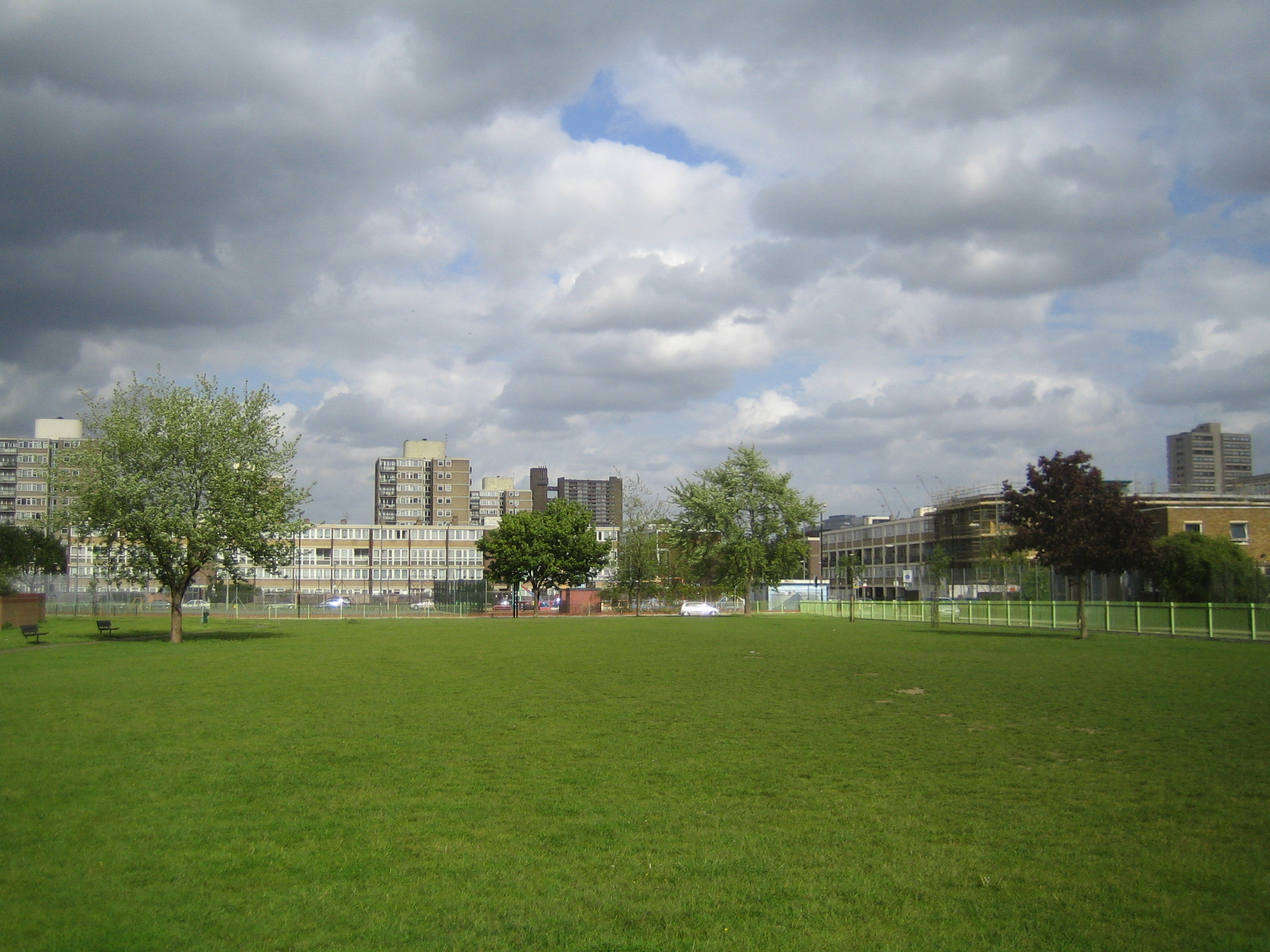
Bartlett Park, London (IXUS 40)

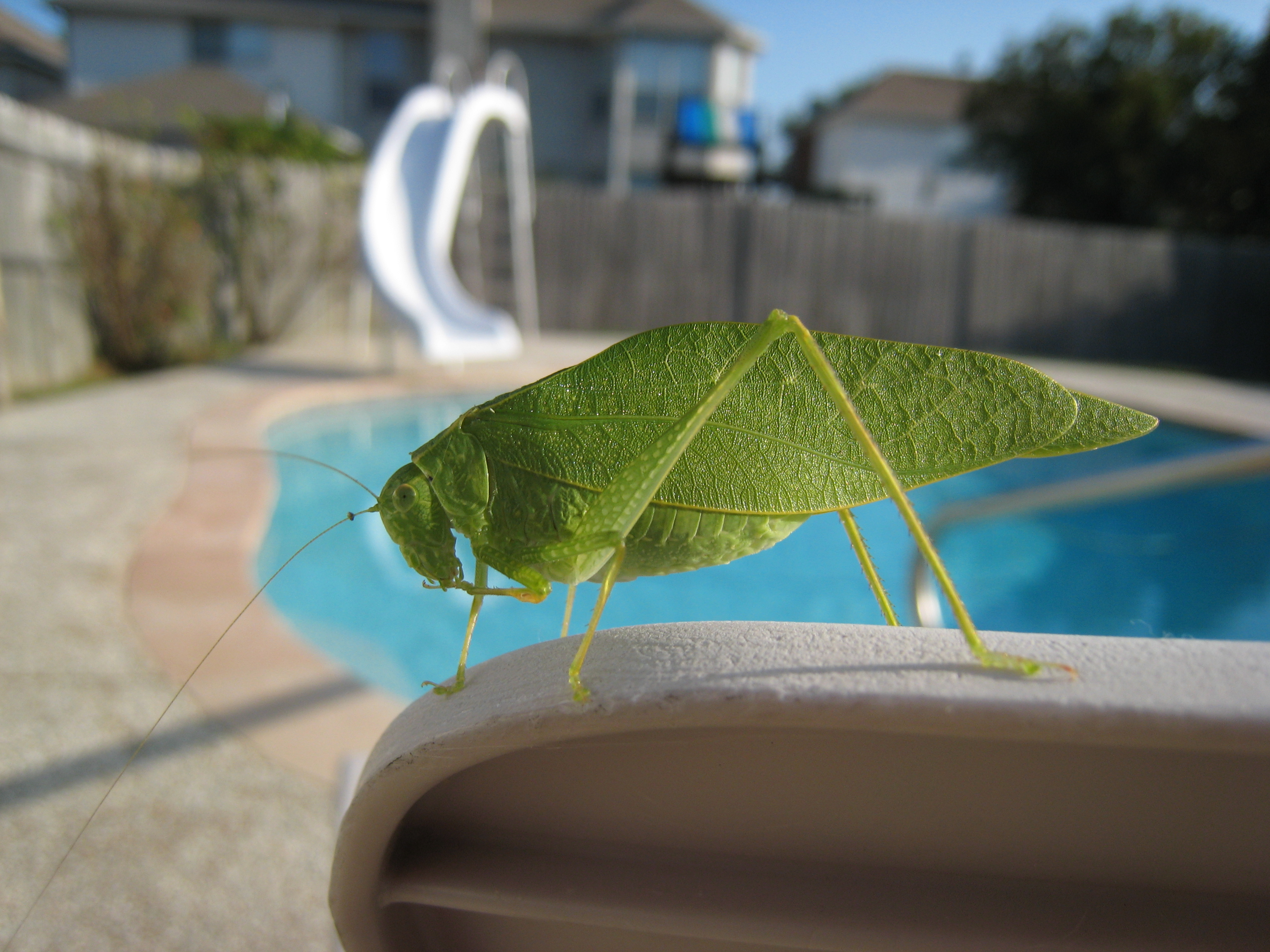
Angle-wing Katydid (Microcentrum), North Texas using Macro mode (PowerShot SD800 IS)

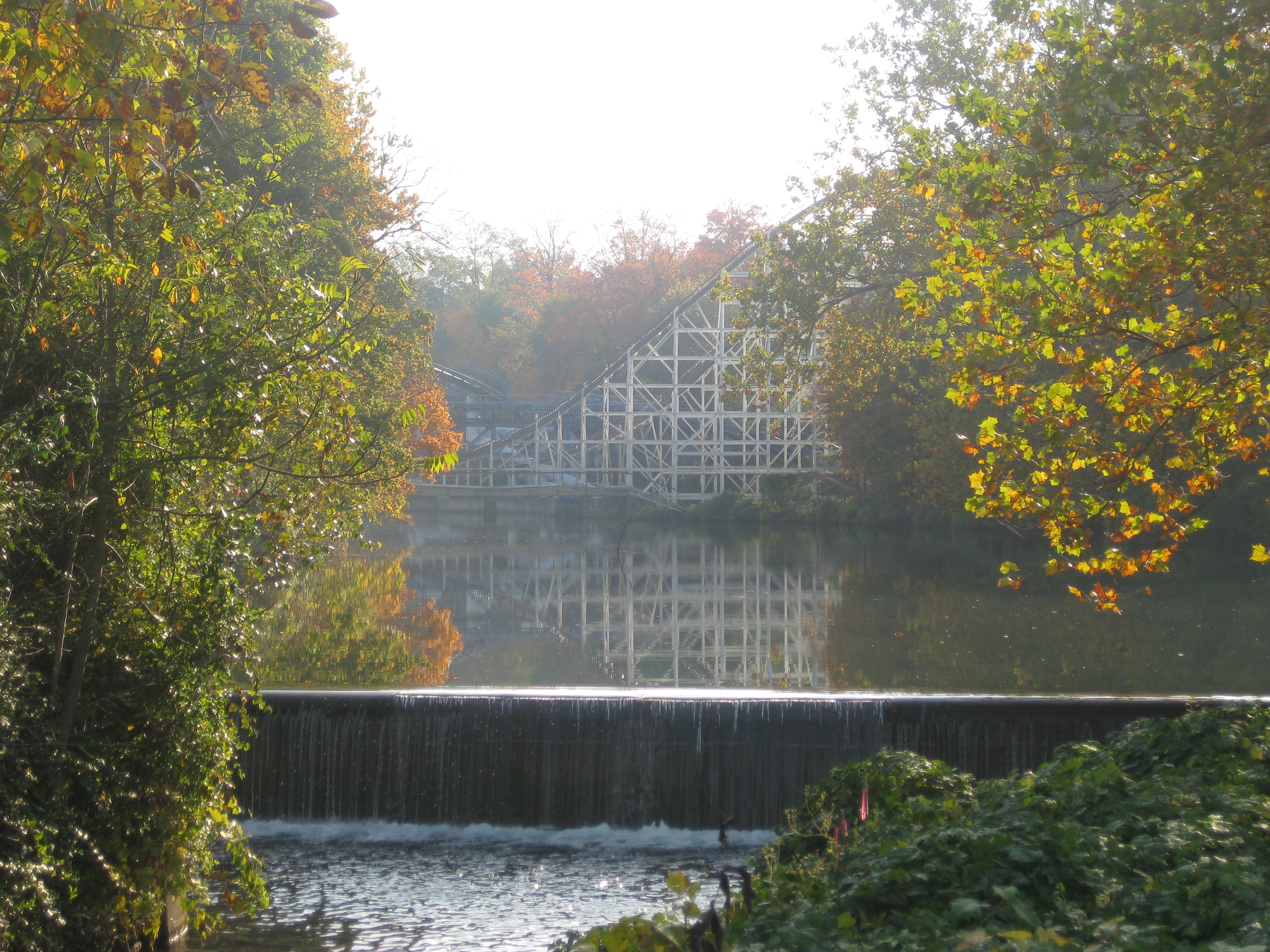
Hersheypark, Hershey, Pennsylvania (PowerShot SD1100 IS)

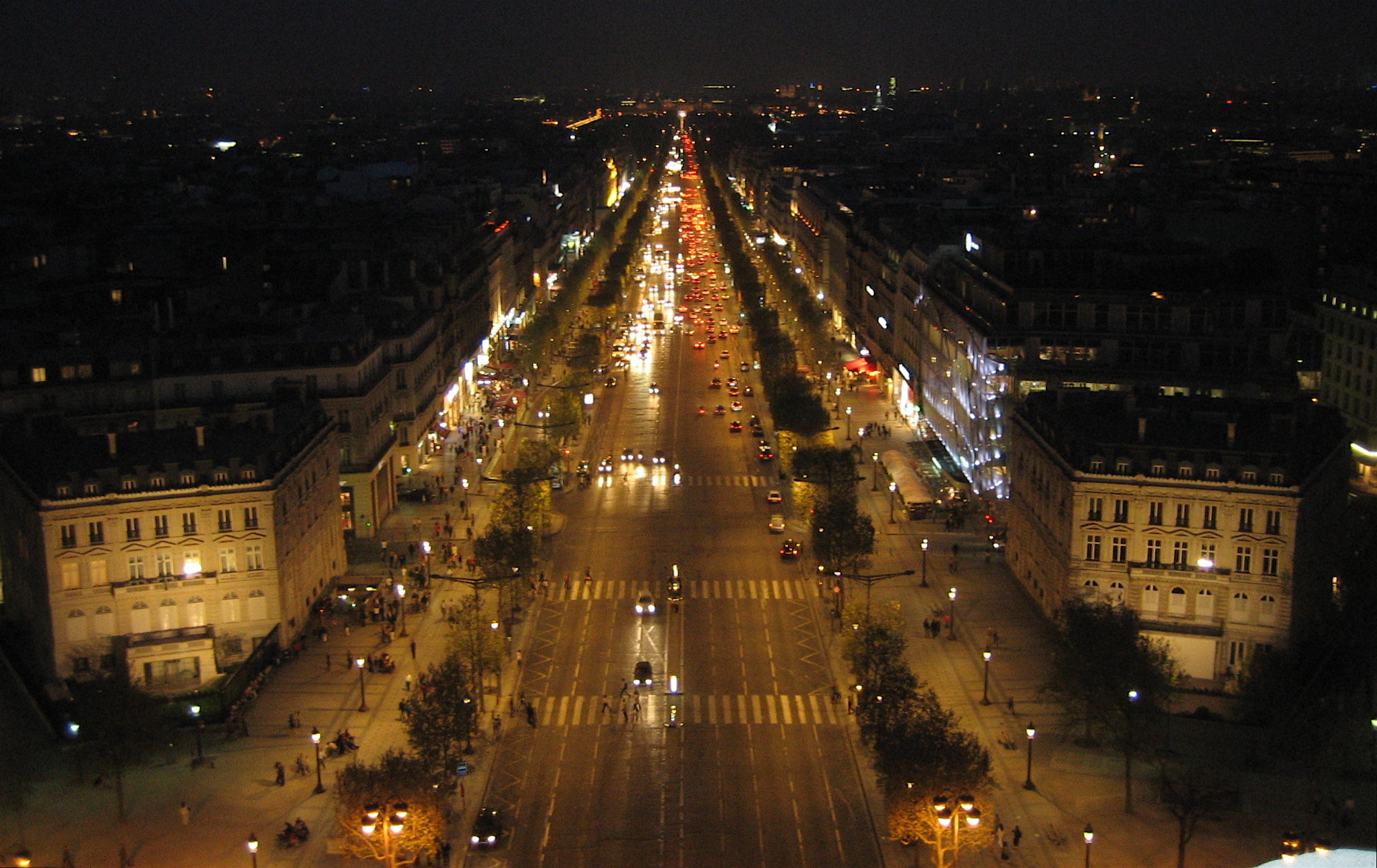
Champs-Élysées, Paris using Night Mode (IXUS 50)

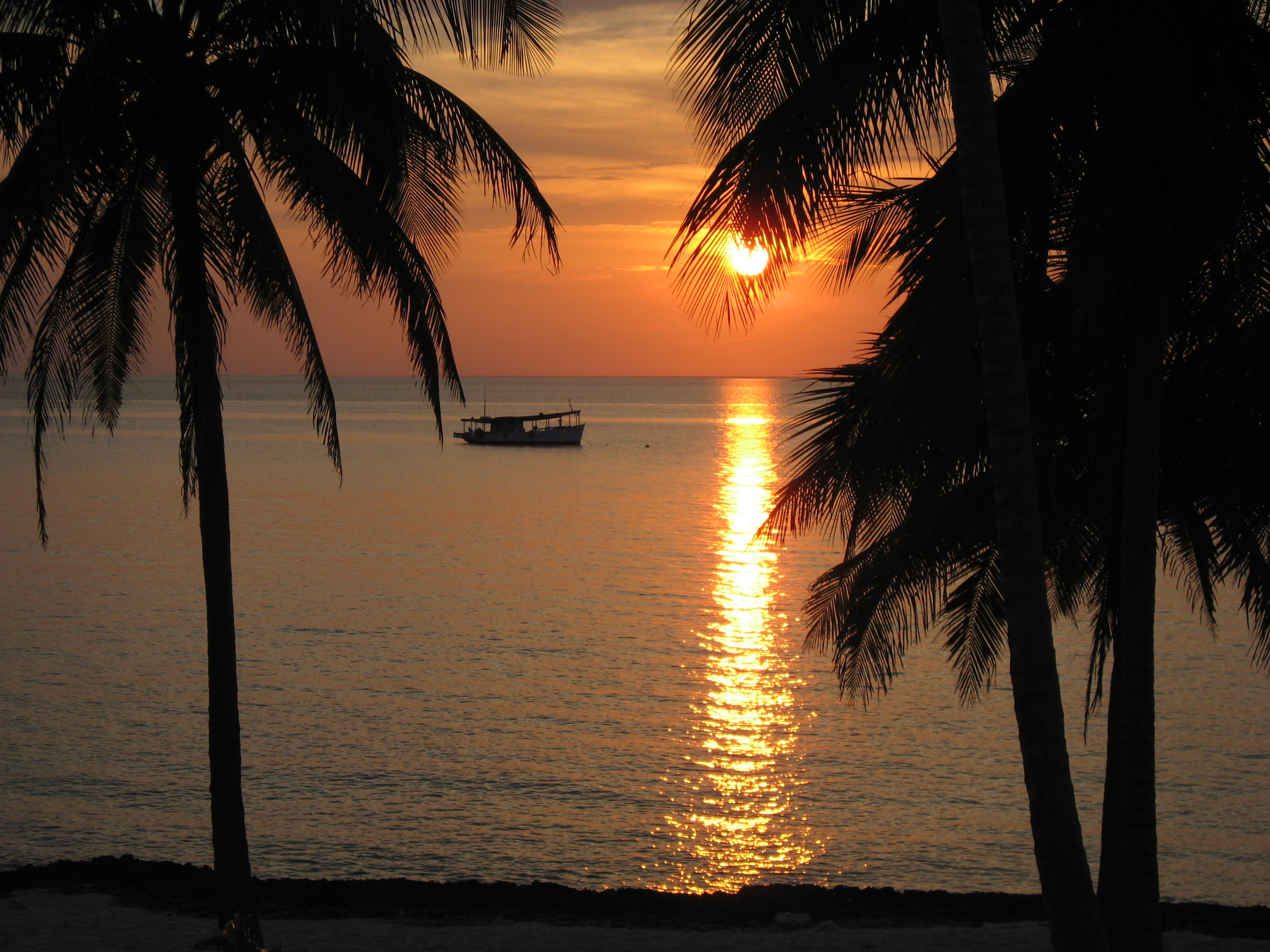
Maria la Gorda, Cuba (IXUS 800)

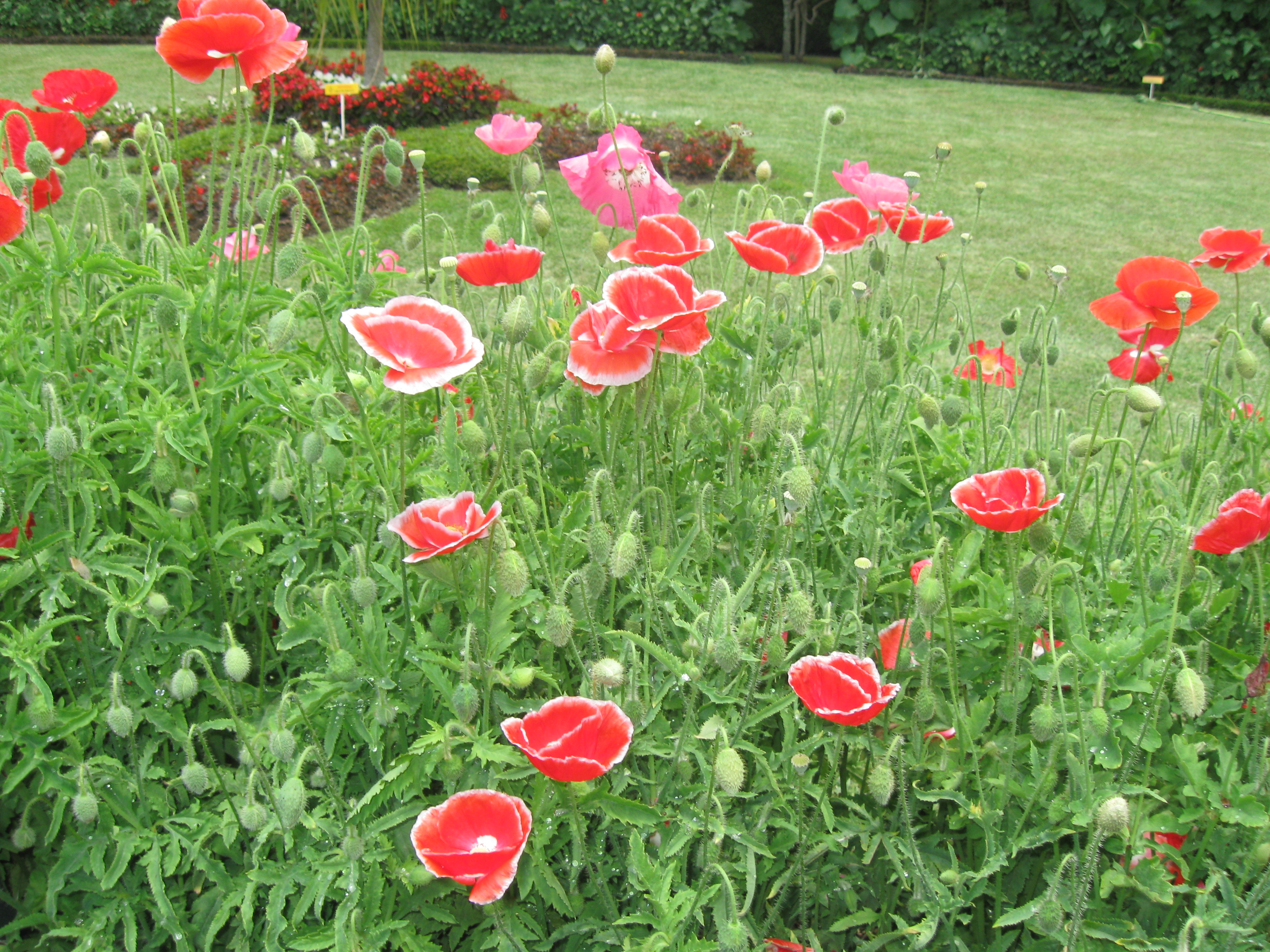
Grand Hotel flower garden (PowerShot A580)

== See also ==
- Canon PowerShot
- List of Canon products

== Notes ==
- Note 1: The PC1001 was marketed as "Digital IXUS," "IXY Digital" and "PowerShot S100 Digital ELPH."
