= E18 error =

Canon error message

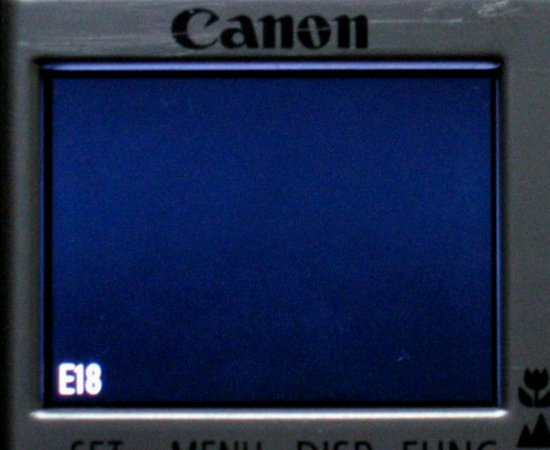
The E18 error as it appears on a camera's LCD (an Ixus II in this example)

The E18 error is an error message on Canon digital cameras. The E18 error occurs when anything prevents the zoom lens from properly extending or retracting. The error has become notorious in the Canon user community as it can completely disable the camera, requiring expensive repairs.

ConsumerAffairs.com reports that the "lens has a feature called bellows claw, which is a gear that physically extends and retracts the lens. A piece that holds the lens, the barrier plate, is not large enough and can sometimes cause the bellows claw to malfunction, resulting in a stuck lens". The result is a black screen that only contains the error message, E18. Another problem mentioned on the site blames a sticky iris in the lens, caused by grease entering inside from the microphones built into the lens. The buildup freezes up the ability of the lens to open.

Although the use of the E18 error coding made this problem seem to be the particular domain of Canon cameras, the problem is actually quite common throughout all cameras with telescopic lens barrels. As a result, Canon has since dropped the use of this error code in its newer cameras. In its place it has adopted the more common term "lens error" that other manufacturers use. As such, its newer cameras report this term when the problem occurs.

== Causes ==
According to Canon, one may get an E18 due to any of the following:

- Camera activating and lens opening while in a confined space or being blocked
- Extracted lens getting jarred
- Low battery condition as the unit is turned on or off
- Dropping of the camera
- Foreign substances, such as dust, sand or dirt entering the camera body.
- General jarring of the camera
- "General camera malfunction"

One major contributor to E18 lens errors is the improper use of camera cases, or the carrying of cameras in pockets. An inadvertent activation of the camera while in the case or pocket may cause the lens to extend with the lens restricted in its movement, causing the error. Another cause is that sand, dust, and dirt will accumulate in the bottom of the case if it is not cleaned regularly (and lint for pockets). These materials readily cling to the camera by electrostatic build-up from the camera rubbing against the side of the case, especially for those cases with soft fibrous interiors. The lens error will occur once these materials work their way into the lens mechanism. Another major contributor is sand in general. Extra care should be utilized when taking a camera to the beach. Sand can cling to the lens barrel, again by electrostatic attraction. This may jam the lens mechanism when it tries to close. When at the beach, always inspect the lens barrel prior to closing to ensure that no sand particles are clinging to it (a single grain can jam the camera).

== Repairing the E18 error ==
Two different types of problems are reported:

- The camera can take a couple of shots (clear and in focus), then stops working. Removing the batteries and replacing may produce 2–3 extra shots.
  - Canon's instructions (by phone) are to 'remove the batteries, rotate the on button and hold for 5 seconds, and then replace the battery'. The few lucky pictures are clear and in focus.
  - A better solution (not provided by Canon) is to connect the camera to the TV or a computer. This may completely solve the problem. If not, it may at least allow an extra 10–15 shots. There are several forums on the net that mention that connecting the camera to the TV completely resolved the E18 error.
- A camera lens is out-of-focus. Some users have been able to manipulate the lens back into place (see reference links below). To fix the problem, it is often necessary that the camera and optical assembly is disassembled, realigned and reassembled. A non-warranty repair at an authorized service center reportedly costs between US$79 and $250.

There are a number of online guides to repairing E18 errors oneself, from simple guides on tapping the lens back into place to complete disassembly/realignment/reassembly instructions.

Many of these fixes are presented in the below listed "External Links", and may also be found on search engines when the more common term "lens error" is utilized for the search.

== Class action ==
A Chicago law firm, Horwitz, Horwitz & Associates, filed a class action lawsuit in 2005. The law firm Girard Gibbs & De Bartolomeo LLP is investigating this camera error and may file a class-action lawsuit against Canon. A lawsuit was filed and dismissed in 2006, but the plaintiffs planned to appeal.
