= Canon PowerShot G =

Series of digital cameras

Canon PowerShot G series
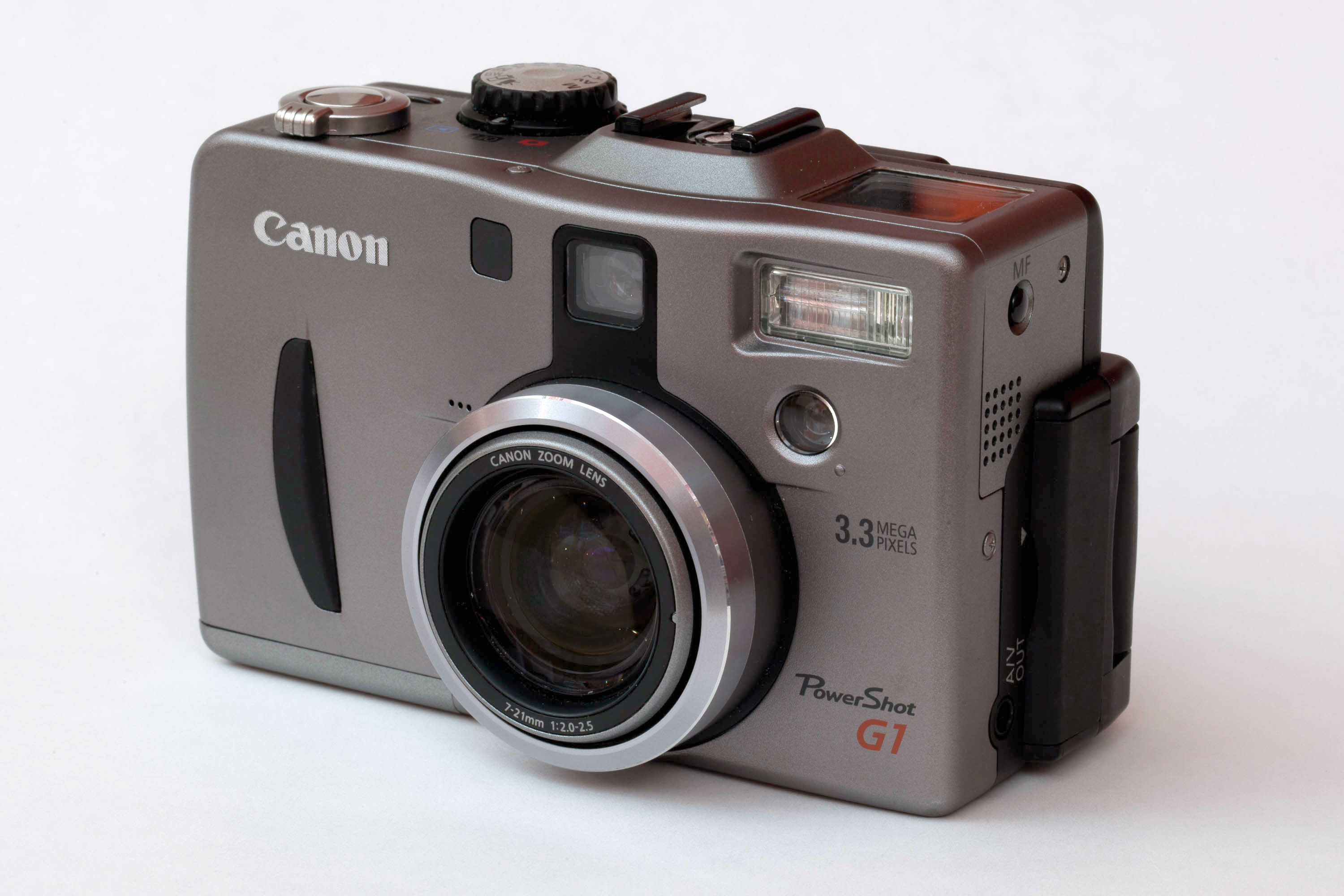

Overview
- Maker: Canon Inc.
- Type: Digital Camera

Lens
- Lens: See table below

Sensor/medium
- Sensor: 1/1.8" CCD (G1-G7); 1/1.7" CCD (G9-G12); 1/1.7" CMOS (G15-G16); 1.5" CMOS (G1 X); 1" CMOS (G3 X-G9 X); APS-C CMOS (G1 X mark III)
- Maximum resolution: See table below
- Film speed: Auto, ISO 80 – 3200 (in 1/3-step increments); G1 X: Auto, ISO 100 – 12800 (1/3-step increments)
- Storage media: CompactFlash (G1-G6); Secure Digital (G7-present)

Focusing
- Focus modes: Single, Continuous (only available in Auto mode), Servo AF/AEl

Exposure/metering
- Metering modes: Evaluative, Center-weighted average, Spot (fixed to center)

Flash
- Flash: 50cm - 70m (wide), 50cm - 4.0m (tele)

Shutter
- Shutter: Mechanical shutter + electronic shutter
- Shutter speed range: 1/1600 – 1 sec. (Auto mode), 1/1600 to 15 sec. G1 X: 1/4000 – 60 sec. in all modes

Image processing
- White balance: Auto, Daylight, Cloudy, Tungsten, Fluorescent, Fluorescent H, Flash, Underwater, Custom

General
- LCD screen: See table below
- Dimensions: See table below
- Weight: See table below
- Made in: Japan

The Canon PowerShot G is a series of digital cameras introduced by Canon in its PowerShot line in 2000. The G series cameras are Canon's flagship compact models aimed at photography enthusiasts desiring more flexibility than a typical point-and-shoot without the bulk of a digital single-lens reflex camera.

The G series has a lithium-ion battery, full manual exposure control, an articulated LCD screen (G7, G9, G10, G15, and G16 have a fixed screen), Raw image format capture (all models except the G7), a lens with a wider maximum aperture than standard PowerShot models, remote capture (except the G11), and faster image processing. The range also includes a hot shoe (except the G7 X and G9 X) for an external flash, including Canon's EX range. New models in the series (all containing "X" in their name) have larger sensors than most other point-and-shoot cameras.

In recent years, smartphones and interchangeable-lens cameras have squeezed the compact point-and-shoot market, and as of February 2024 the vlogger-friendly G7 X Mark II and G7 X Mark III remain the only models in the series still in production and available new.

== Main specifications ==
=== G1 to G6 ===
Common features across the early G series were:

- A fast lens (minimum F number of 2.0)
- A flip out and twist LCD, along with a smaller status LCD on the top of the camera
- Raw image format capture
- 1/1.8-inch CCD sensor
- Manual selection of aperture and shutter priority
- Custom white balance
- Built in flash
- Hot-shoe for external flash
- USB connectivity
- A Compact Flash card slot
- Availability of optional wide and teleconverter lenses
- Canon's proprietary EOS shooting modes, allowing the photographer to select different exposure settings for different environments
- Included infrared remote control
- In-built neutral density filter from the G3 onwards
- Lithium-ion battery

=== G7 to G12 ===
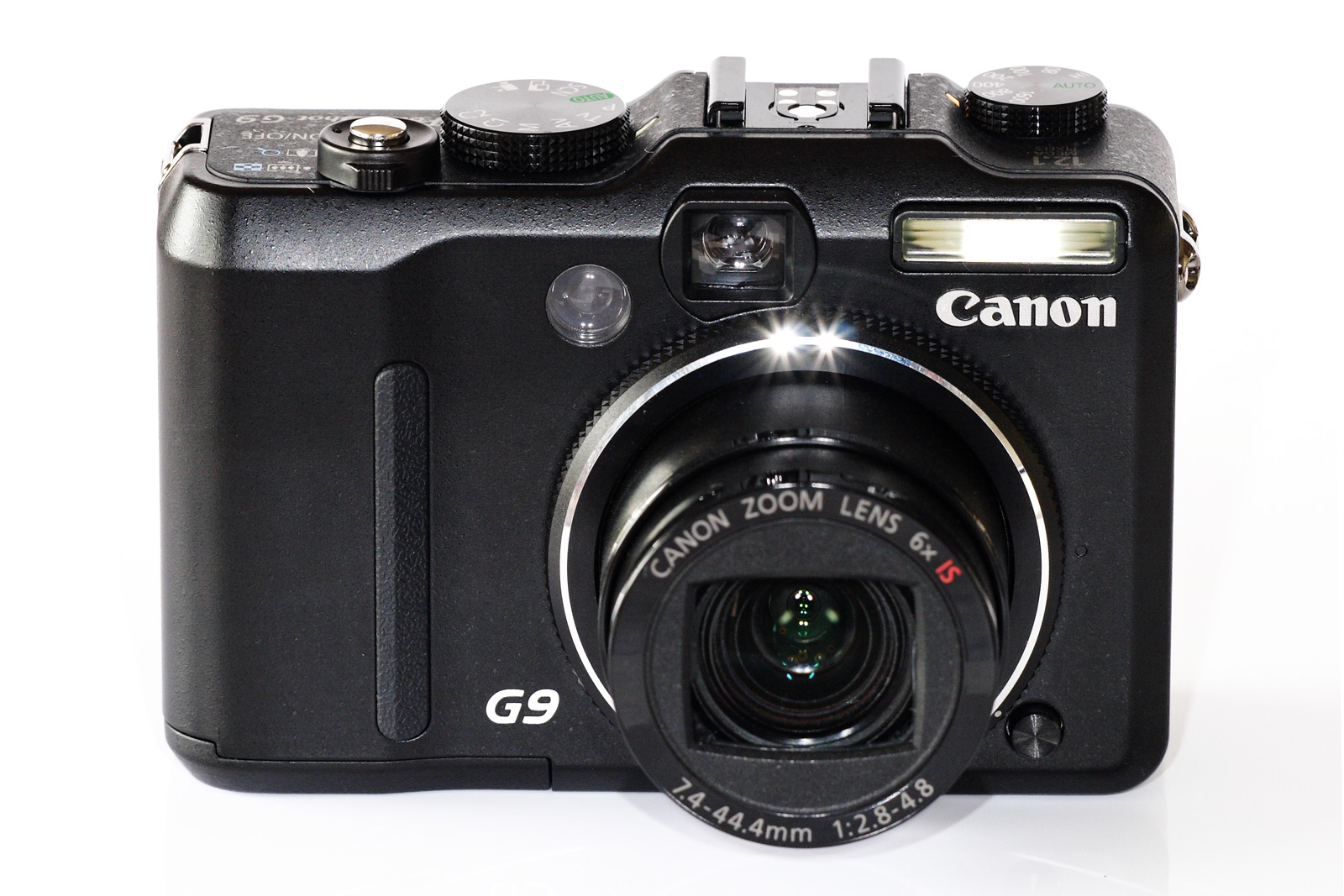
Canon Powershot G9

The G7 (September 2006) marked a major change in the G series. Previous G series models had a fast lens, raw image format capture, and a tilt-and-swivel LCD. These were all considered hallmarks of the G series, but were removed or altered for the G7. Some of the major changes included:

- Introduction of a lens with a minimum F number of 2.8, compared to 2.0 in other G series cameras. Although slower, this lens introduced improvements such as optical image stabilisation, a higher zoom range (6×), and a macro mode that would focus as close as 1 cm. The lens would also retract completely into the camera.
- Change to a fixed LCD rather than a tilt-and-swivel model. The fixed LCD was larger (2.5″ versus 2.0″ on the G6) and increased the number of pixels by 75%. The tilt-and swivel LCD was restored with the G11, but removed again with the G15.
- Removal of RAW image format on G7, but returned for the G9–G16.
- No infrared remote control.
- Change from CompactFlash to SDHC card storage.
- Black, mostly metal, body.
- Canon G12 records videos up to 720p HD quality, G15 1080p HD and G1 X 1080p. G15 and G1 X do allow to use zoom and autofocus during video recording.

Many of the changes made allowed the G7 to be significantly slimmer than previous G series cameras (e.g., the thickness of the G7 is 4.25 cm while the G6 is 7.3 cm), making it more portable.

Canon's removal of RAW shooting support was heavily criticized. DPReview expressed their disappointment with the loss of RAW format, while Luminous Landscape stated that the removal of RAW required too many technical decisions had to be made while shooting instead of during post-processing. RAW support can be enabled on the G7 using a free firmware add-on.

The G9 was released in 2007. RAW support was restored, and it has a larger LCD screen, and a 1/1.7″ sensor rather than the 1/1.8″ sensor on previous models.

The G11, released in 2009, reintroduced the flip out and twist LCD (2.8″). It also has a lower resolution sensor than that of its predecessor, the G10, because the new CCD favoured low light performance over resolution.

=== G15 and G16 ===
The G15 was the successor to the G12 as the cheaper G series model. It marked a return to a lens faster than those of early G cameras. It also has:

- Minimum F-numbers of 1.8 at the wide end and 2.8 at the tele end of the zoom range; the G12 had a minimum F-number of 2.8 at the wide end
- Pop-up flash button from the top of the camera

The G16 offered only minor improvements over the G15, for example:

- faster image processing
- automatic star/star trail photography
- 60 fps HD movies
- Wi-Fi

=== G1 X ===
The G1 X was introduced in February 2012 and is the first large-sensor entry in the series as designated by the "X" after the model number. It is also the first model in the series with a CMOS sensor. The G1 X's sensor measures 18.7 mm × 14.0 mm (1.5 in), which makes it 16 percent larger than Micro Four Thirds (MFT) sensors and 20 percent smaller than Canon's APS-C sensors. G1 X was significant that it did not replace the older G12 but created a parallel model in the first time in G-series. Later that trend would continue with five parallel models from 2015 on. The camera is also bigger and heavier than the other G-series cameras, and the zoom range in equivalent 35 mm is only 28-112 mm (4x). With its maximum aperture over its zoom range being F2.8-5.8, and with its sensor smaller than Canon APS-C sensor, the G1 X camera-lens system can be compared to the APS-C DSLRs using the Canon EF-S 18-55 mm f/3.5-5.6 IS II SLR Kit Lens: the G1 X is a little faster (wider aperture) at the wide angle and comparable thereafter, but with a longer zoom.

Released at early 2014, the G1 X Mark II has a 13.1-megapixel (in 4:3 aspect ratio), but still 1.5-inch CMOS sensor as the predecessor, a 24–120 mm (5x) f/2-3.9 relatively a fast zoom lens, for better shallow depth of field throughout the maximum-aperture range, and sharp shots even in low light, a DIGIC 6 processor with capability to take 1080/60p MP4 video shoots. The camera lacks a built-in viewfinder but supports an external electronic one. It has no microphone input or headphone jack.

In October 2017, Canon introduced the third model of the G1 X-series: Canon PowerShot G1 X Mark III. It replaced the 1.5-inch sensor with a 24-megapixel APS-C sensor used in many Canon EOS DSLR and mirrorless cameras. The camera also was much reduced in size and weight, weighting only 399 grams. To achieve the reduced size the zoom range was reduced to 15–45 mm (24–72 mm in 35 mm equivalence) and the size of the aperture was reduced from f/2.0-3.9 to f/2.8-5.6. The Mark III also has a built-in viewfinder and a DSLR-like form factor much similar to the G5 X. It also is the first PowerShot (with the exception of waterproof D-series) to have weather sealing.

=== G3 X ===
G3 X is the only superzoom model in the G-series. It offers a 25x zoom (24–600 mm equivalent) with aperture f/2.8-5.6. It offers an alternative to the Canon Powershot SX-series cameras with much better image quality. Because of the lens, the camera is much larger than other G-series cameras - weighing 739 grams. The camera also supports an optional electronic viewfinder: either the EVF-DC1 or the EVF-DC2.

The G3 X matches the Sony RX10 III and IV for the longest zoom range available on a large-sensor bridge camera but in a much smaller package than its Sony counterparts.

=== G5 X ===
In Q3 2015, Canon introduced the PowerShot G5 X as the successor to the Canon PowerShot G16. The G5 X uses a 1-inch sensor, significantly larger than the G16's 1/1.7" sensor. The G5 X is essentially a G7 X with a built-in electronic viewfinder, whereas the G16 had an optical viewfinder. The G5 X also has a DSLR-like form factor with the viewfinder in the center instead of the rangefinder-like offset viewfinder on the G16.

In 2019, the G5 X line was updated with a new model — the G5 X Mark II — that replaced the micro USB port with a USB-C port and offered 4K video recording. The G5 X Mark II also included a new lens and a pop-up electronic viewfinder that required manual operation like on older Sony RX100 models. This update returned the line to a rangefinder-like body shape and emphasized its photography focus, compared to the more vlogging-oriented G7 X line.

=== G7 X ===
With the G7 X, Canon added its own model to the large-sensor compact camera market. The G7X is Canon's first 1-inch sensor model and boasts 20 megapixels and the DIGIC 6 image processor. Despite this, the camera is still small enough to be pocketable like its primary competitor, the Sony RX100. It has a 4.2x zoom (24–100 mm in 35 mm format), a maximum aperture of f/1.8-f/2.8, ISO 12800, Full HD video shooting, 31 AF points, and Wi-Fi/NFC support. It inherits many characteristics of the previous G-series cameras, including the comparable G1 X Mark II. The G7 X is the first G-series camera without a hot shoe.

In 2016 Canon announced the Canon PowerShot G7 X Mark II which follows the original G7 X. It retains the same sensor and lens as its predecessor. The main improvement is the new DIGIC 7 Processor. In fact the G7 X Mark II is the first Canon camera to use this new chip. This new chip leads to better AF performance, object tracking, reduced ISO noise and higher speed burst shooting. Some other improvements are that the screen can now flip both up and down, a new grip, tiltable flash, auto functionality for the ND filter, battery charging over USB, and a new timelapse mode.

In 2019, the G7 X line was updated with a new model — the G7 X Mark III — that replaced the micro USB port with a USB-C port and offered 4K video recording. The G7 X Mark III had mixed reviews due to inconsistent autofocus especially at close range, but it continued to be popular thanks to its portability, ease of use, and pleasant straight-out-of-camera color rendition.

=== G9 X ===
In Q3 2015, Canon introduced the PowerShot G9 X as the successor to the Canon PowerShot S120. Even with the 1-inch sensor, G9 X is similar in size to the S120. The larger sensor necessitated that the zoom range be reduced from 5x to 3x, that is from 24-120 mm to 28-84 mm. With the introduction of the G9 X, the S-series was discontinued. It also meant the end of the use of 1/1.7" (9.5 mm diagonal) sensors in Canon cameras. Higher-end models henceforth used 1-inch (16 mm diagonal) sensors or larger, and whereas other models using 1/2.3" (7.7 mm diagonal) sensors.

In 2017 Canon updated the G9 X line with the G9 X Mark II offering the new Digic 7 processor, faster operation and built-in RAW processing. No external changes were made.

== Model details ==
Model	Release date	Sensor resolution, size, type	Video specification	Lens (35 mm equiv) zoom, aperture	Image pro- cessor	LCD screen size, subpixels	View finder	Memory card	Size W×H×D (mm)	Weight (body)	Notes
G1	September 2000	3.3 MP; 2048 × 1536; 1/1.8″ CCD	320×240 15 fps	34–102 mm (3×) f/2.0–2.5		1.8″ vari-angle	Optical	CF	120 × 77 × 64	420 g	Initial PowerShot G series model.
G2	August 2001	4 MP; 2272 × 1704; 1/1.8″ CCD	320×240 15 fps	34–102 mm (3×) f/2.0–2.5		1.8″ vari-angle	Optical	CF	121 × 77 × 64	510 g	
G3	September 2002	4 MP; 2272 × 1704; 1/1.8″ CCD	320×240 15 fps	35–140 mm (4×) f/2.0–3.0	DIGIC	1.8″ vari-angle	Optical	CF	121 × 74 × 70	481 g	Introduction of DIGIC processor. Introduction of internal neutral density filter.
G5	June 2003	5 MP; 2592 × 1944; 1/1.8″ CCD	320×240 15 fps	35–140 mm (4×) f/2.0–3.0	DIGIC	1.8″ vari-angle 118,000	Optical	CF	121 × 74 × 70	481 g	
G6	August 2004	7.1 MP; 3072 × 2304; 1/1.8″ CCD	640×480 10 fps 320×240 15 fps	35–140 mm (4×) f/2.0–3.0	DIGIC	2.0″ vari-angle 118,000	Optical	CF	105 × 73 × 73	380 g	
G7	September 2006	10 MP; 3648 × 2736; 1/1.8″ CCD	1024×768 15 fps 640×480 30 fps	35–210 mm (6×) f/2.8–4.8	DIGIC III	2.5″ fixed 207,000	Optical	SD, SDHC, MMC	106 × 72 × 43	320 g	Introduction of DIGIC III processor. Introduction of a new lens brought a 1 cm macro mode and lens shift optical image stabilisation. Maximum sensitivity of ISO 3200. Face detection auto focus. The only G series camera to lack RAW mode capture. No Compact Flash support.
G9	August 2007	12.1 MP; 4000 × 3000; 1/1.7″ CCD	1024×768 15 fps 640×480 30 fps	35–210 mm (6×) f/2.8–4.8	DIGIC III	3.0″ fixed 230,000	Optical	SD, SDHC, MMC	106 × 72 × 43	320 g	Similar to the G7. Most notable changes were reintroduction of Raw image format capture, a better LCD, and a new sensor.
G10	October 2008	14.7 MP; 4416 × 3312; 1/1.7″ CCD	640×480 30 fps	28–140 mm (5×) f/2.8–4.5	DIGIC 4	3.0″ fixed 461,000	Optical	SD, SDHC, MMC, MMC+, HC MMC+	109 × 78 × 46	350 g	Introduced DIGIC 4 and a redesigned wide-angle lens with shorter zoom range. Increased LCD and CCD resolution. New higher-capacity lithium-ion battery NB-7L.
G11	October 2009	10 MP; 3648 × 2736; 1/1.7″ CCD	640×480 30 fps	28–140 mm (5×) f/2.8–4.5	DIGIC 4	2.8″ vari-angle 461,000	Optical	SD, SDHC, MMC, MMC+, HC MMC+	112 × 76 × 48	355 g	Reduced CCD resolution to 10 MP. Vari-angle screen. Improved noise control – up to ISO 12800 in 2.5 MP resolution. Second curtain sync for flash. Added HDMI Out. No remote capture support.
G12	September 2010	10 MP; 3648 × 2736; 1/1.7″ CCD	720p 24 fps	28–140 mm (5×) f/2.8–4.5	DIGIC 4	2.8″ vari-angle 461,000	Optical	SD, SDHC, MMC, MMC+, HC MMC+	112.1 × 76.2 × 48.3	351 g	Adds 720p video recording, front control dial, and Hybrid IS.
G1 X	January 2012	14.3 MP; 4352 × 3264; 1.5″ CMOS	1080p 24 fps 720p 30 fps	28–112 mm (4×) f/2.8–5.8	DIGIC 5	3.0″ vari-angle 920,000	Optical	SD, SDHC, MMC, MMC+, HC MMC+	117 × 81 × 65	492 g	First PowerShot G with CMOS. Introduced DIGIC 5 and a redesigned 4× wide-angle lens. Adds 1080p video recording. The first model that did not replace the previous one.
G15	September 2012	12 MP; 4000 × 3000; 1/1.7″ CMOS	1080p 24 fps 720p 30 fps 640×480 120 fps 320×240 240 fps	28–140 mm (5×) f/1.8-2.8	DIGIC 5	3.0″ fixed 922,000	Optical	SD, SDHC, MMC, MMC+, HC MMC+	107 × 76 × 40	352 g	Adds a quicker zoom lens (f1.8-2.8 rather than f2.8-4.5) with 'intelligent IS' image stabilization, adds 1080p video recording (24 fps), adds a dedicated movie record button, quicker autofocus, extended ISO range (up to 12800), fixed rather than articulated screen.
G16	August 2013	12 MP; 4000 × 3000; 1/1.7″ CMOS	1080p 60 fps 640×480 120 fps 320×240 240 fps	28–140 mm (5×) f/1.8-2.8	DIGIC 6	3.0″ fixed 922,000	Optical	SD, SDHC, SDXC	109 × 76 × 40	356 g	Adds Wi-Fi and DIGIC 6. Last of the old series with an OVF and a small sensor.
G1 X Mark II	February 2014	3:2 12,8 MP; 4.352 x 2.904; 4:3 13.1 MP; 4.160 x 3.120; 1.5″ CMOS	1080p 30 fps	24–120 mm (5×) f/2.0–3.9	DIGIC 6	3.0″ tilt LCD; 1,040,000	Electronic, optional	SD, SDHC, SDXC	116 x 74 x 66	558 g	Introduced a redesigned 5× wide-angle lens.
G7 X	September 2014	20 MP 1″ BSI-CMOS	1080p 60 fps	24–100 mm (4.2×) f/1.8–2.8	DIGIC 6	3.0″ tilt LCD; 1,040,000	No viewfinder	SD, SDHC, SDXC	103 x 60 x 40	304 g	First PowerShot G to not have a hot shoe
G3 X	October 2015	20 MP 1″ BSI-CMOS	1080p 60 fps	24–600 mm (25×) f/2.8-5.6	DIGIC 6	3.0″ tilt LCD; 1,040,000	Electronic, optional	SD, SDHC, SDXC	123 x 77 x 105	733 g	Alternative to the SX series
G5 X	October 2015	20 MP 1″ BSI-CMOS	1080p 60 fps	24–100 mm (4.2×) f/1.8–2.8	DIGIC 6	3.0″ articulated LCD; 1,040,000	Electronic	SD, SDHC, SDXC	112 x 76 x 44	353 g	Replaced the G16
G9 X	October 2015	20 MP 1″ BSI-CMOS	1080p 60 fps	28–84 mm (3×) f/2.0–4.9	DIGIC 6	3.0″ LCD; 1,040,000	No viewfinder	SD, SDHC, SDXC	98 x 58 x 31	209 g	Replaced the S120
G7 X Mark II	February 2016	20 MP 1″ BSI-CMOS	1080p 60 fps	24–100 mm (4.2×) f/1.8–2.8	DIGIC 7	3.0″ tilt LCD; 1,040,000	No viewfinder	SD, SDHC, SDXC	106 x 61 x 42	319 g	Replaced the G7 X
G9 X Mark II	January 2017	20 MP 1″ BSI-CMOS	1080p 60 fps	28–84 mm (3×) f/2.0–4.9	DIGIC 7	3.0″ LCD; 1,040,000	No viewfinder	SD, SDHC, SDXC	98 x 58 x 31	206 g	Replaced the G9 X
G1 X Mark III	October 2017	24 MP APS-C	1080p 60 fps	24–72 mm (3×) f/2.8–5.6	DIGIC 7	3.0″ articulated LCD; 1,040,000	Electronic	SD, SDHC, SDXC	150 x 78 x 51	399 g	Replaced the G1 X II
G5 X Mark II	August 2019	20 MP 1″ BSI-CMOS	1080p 120 fps 4k 30 fps	24–120 mm (5×) f/1.8–2.8	DIGIC 8	3.0″ tilt LCD; 1,040,000	Electronic	SD, SDHC, SDXC	111 x 61 x 46	340 g	Replaced the G5 X, similar to the G7 X Mark III
G7 X Mark III	August 2019	20 MP 1″ BSI-CMOS	1080p 120 fps 4k 30 fps	24–100 mm (4.2×) f/1.8–2.8	DIGIC 8	3.0″ tilt LCD; 1,040,000	No viewfinder	SD, SDHC, SDXC	105 x 61 x 41	304 g	

Note that the weight up to G12 is for the camera without the battery and from G1 X on the camera including the battery and the memory card.

== Accessories ==
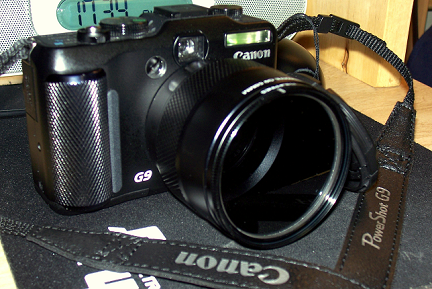
Canon Powershot G9 with custom accessories

The Powershot G series can employ several photographic accessories:

- Filters and other threaded lens accessories can be used with an adapter tube available from Canon or third party suppliers.
- Close-up lenses
- Wide angle or telephoto converter lenses

Starting from the G7, there is a bayonet mount on the front of the camera around the lens to directly attach lenses and accessories.

Powershot G series cameras have a standard threaded socket for mounting to a monopod or tripod. This can also be used for attaching the camera to various brackets or adapters.

With the hot-shoe for external flash, the Powershot G series can accept not only compatible flash units but also various connecting cords and wireless triggers. However, the Powershot G series is sensitive to the voltage produced by certain flash units, particularly older designs. Canon recommends that the maximum trigger voltage be less than 6 volts for any flash or accessory attached to the hot-shoe.

Flash compatibility is somewhat of an issue with the Powershot G series. Canon EX flashes are compatible but all EX features may not necessarily be usable. In particular, when the Powershot G is in manual exposure mode, the external flash is also in manual mode; that is, ETTL flash control is not operable.

== Use by a journalist ==
John D McHugh used a G12 when covering the Bahraini uprising.

== See also ==
- Canon PowerShot A
- Canon PowerShot S/SX
- Canon PowerShot SD or Digital Elph
- List of digital cameras with CCD sensors
