= John McHugh =

John McHugh is the name of:

- John M. McHugh (born 1948), former U.S. representative from New York and Secretary of the Army
- John McHugh (footballer, born 1909) (1909–1966), Scottish football goalkeeper who played in the 1920s and 1930s for a number of British clubs
- John McHugh (footballer, born 1943), Scottish football player from the 1960s and 1970s, former Clyde player
- John McHugh (Medal of Honor), American Indian Wars soldier and Medal of Honor recipient, see 5th Infantry Regiment
- John McHugh (Ohio politician) (1930–2015), mayor of Toledo, Ohio
- John McHugh (Irish politician), MP in the Northern Ireland Parliament for Fermanagh and Tyrone
- John McHugh (tenor) (1912–2002), tenor from Wolverhampton, England
- John D McHugh (born 1973), Irish photojournalist and filmmaker
- John McHugh Sr. (1924–2019), American World War II veteran
