= S120 =

S120 may refer to:

- HMS Ambush (S120), a 2007–2008 proposed Astute-class nuclear Fleet submarine of the Royal Navy
- S Papanikolis (S 120), a Type 214 submarine
- RENFE Class 120 (RENFE Serie 120 or S-120) high speed train
- Canon PowerShot S120 digital camera
