= G16 =

G16 may refer to:

== Vehicles ==
- ARM Gutiérrez Zamora (G16), an Auk-class minesweeper of the Mexican Navy
- EMD G16, an American diesel locomotive
- Grumman G-16, an American biplane design later developed into the Grumman F4F monoplane
- HNLMS Tjerk Hiddes (G16), an N-class destroyer of the Royal Dutch Navy
- LSWR G16 class, a British steam locomotive

== Other uses ==
- Canon PowerShot G16, a digital camera
- County Route G16 (California)
- G16 Dandong–Xilinhot Expressway in China
- Suzuki G16 engine, an automobile engine
