= Canon PowerShot G9 X Mark II =

Canon camera

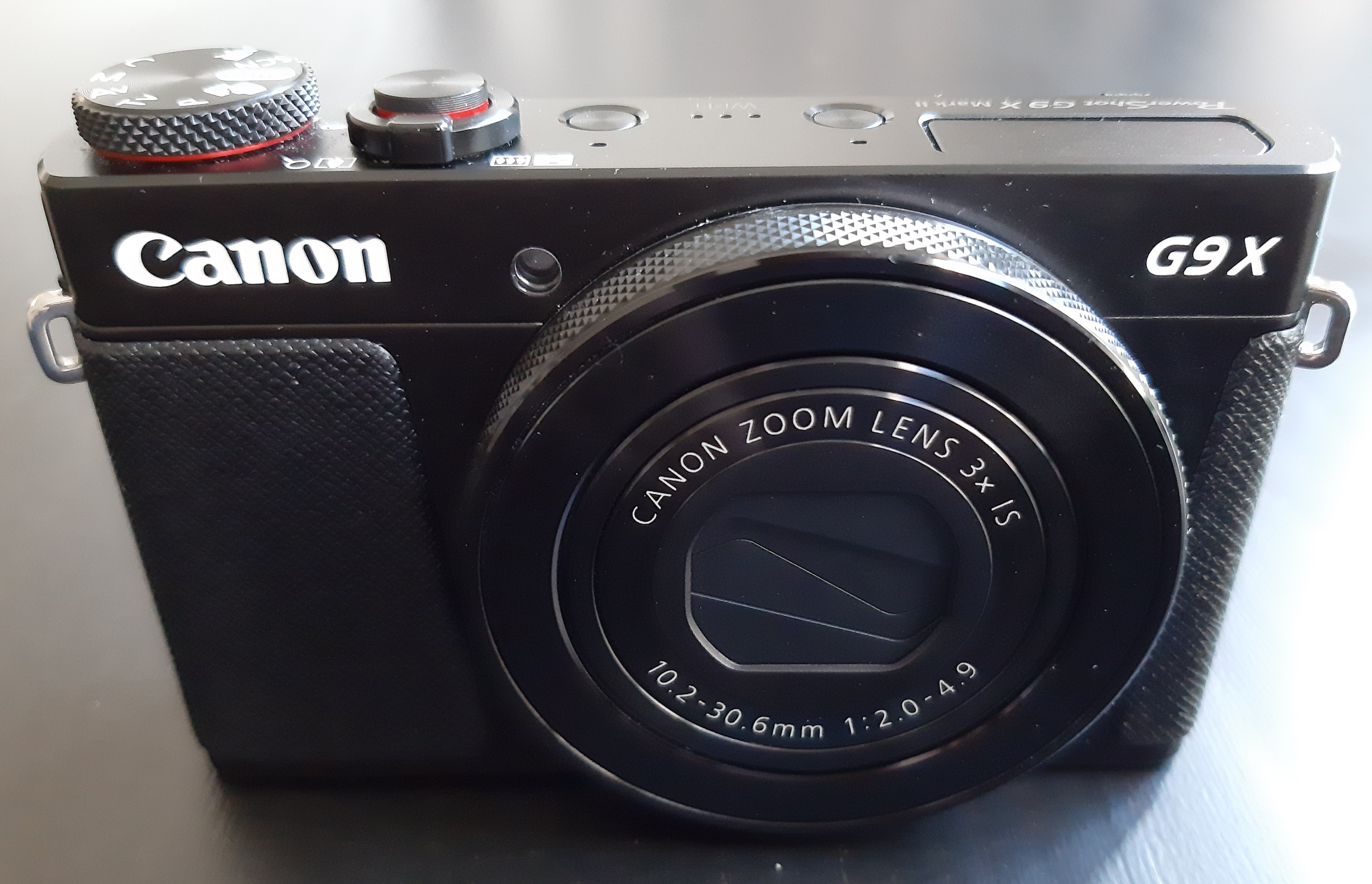
The Canon PowerShot G9 X Mark II.

The Canon PowerShot G9 X Mark II was released by Canon in February 2017. It kept the small size of previous PowerShot models, making it 3 grams lighter than its predecessor. It replaced the Digic 6 processor with a Digic 7 processor, making the camera operations faster. It features a 1.0-inch, 20.1 Megapixel CMOS sensor. The camera is in the Canon PowerShot G series.

== See also ==
- List of large sensor fixed-lens cameras
