= Canon PowerShot G9 X =

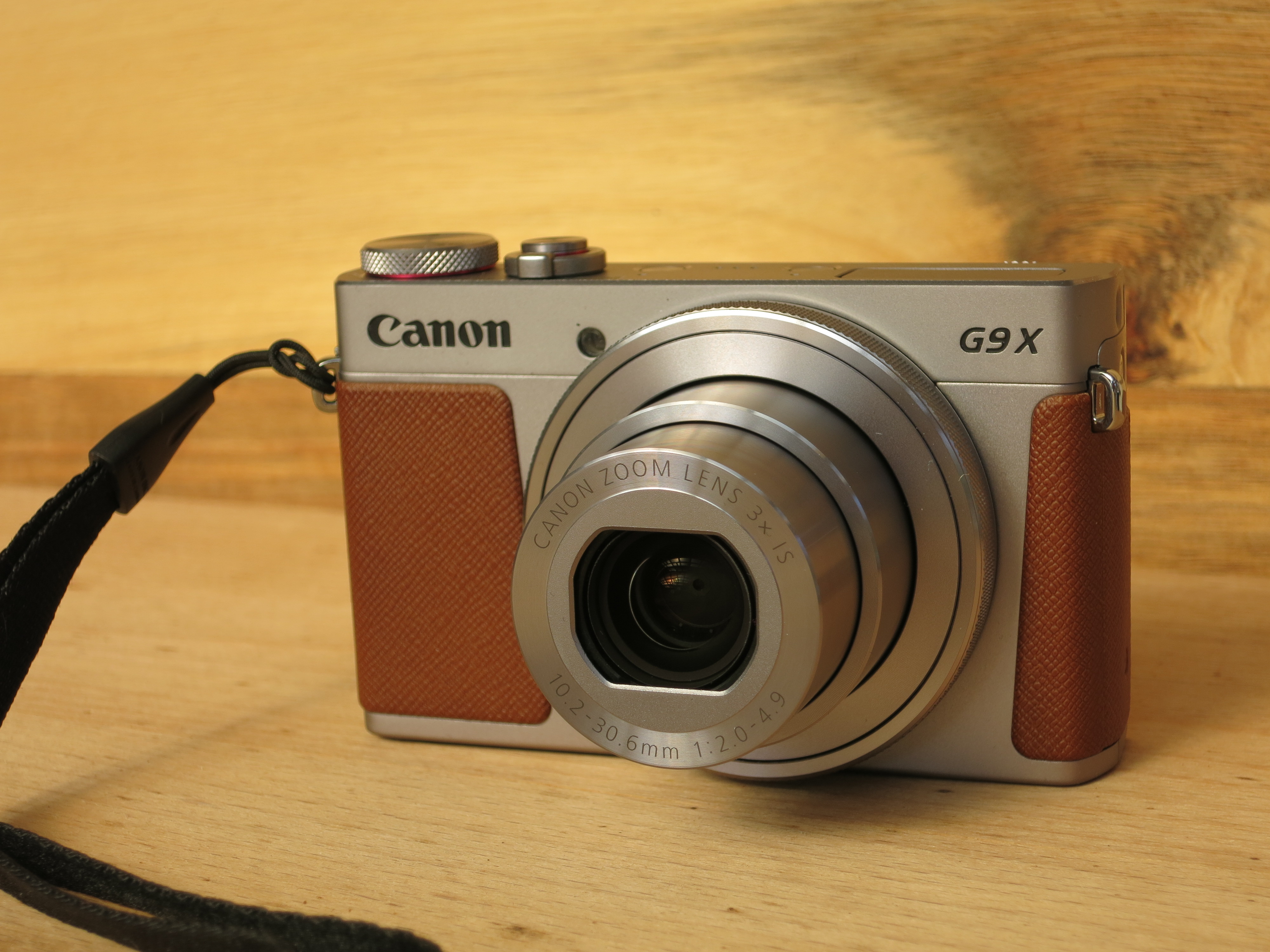

Overview
- Maker: Canon Inc.
- Type: Large sensor fixed-lens camera

Lens
- Lens: 10.2-30.6 (28-84 mm equivalent)
- F-numbers: f/2.0-f/4.9 at the widest

Sensor/medium
- Sensor type: BSI-CMOS
- Sensor size: 13.2 x 8.8mm (1 inch type)
- Maximum resolution: 5472 x 3648 (20 megapixels)
- Film speed: 125-12800
- Recording medium: SD, SDHC or SDXC memory card

Shutter
- Shutter speeds: 1/2000s to 30s
- Continuous shooting: 6 frames per second

Image processing
- Image processor: DIGIC 6
- White balance: Yes

General
- LCD screen: 3 inches with 1,040,000 dots
- Dimensions: 98 x 58 x 31mm (3.86 x 2.28 x 1.21 inches)
- Weight: 209 g (7 oz) including battery

The Canon PowerShot G9 X is a digital compact camera announced by Canon Inc. on October 13, 2015. The G9 X replaces the older Canon PowerShot S120 compact camera. With a reduced zoom range and larger sensor, the camera was the smallest and lightest compact camera since the Canon PowerShot G7 X.

In January 2017 Canon announced the upcoming release of the PowerShot G9 X Mark II.
