= Canon PowerShot G16 =

Overview
- Maker: Canon

Lens
- Lens: 28-140mm equivalent
- F-numbers: f/1.8-f/2.8 at the widest

Sensor/medium
- Sensor type: BSI-CMOS
- Sensor size: 7.44 x 5.58mm (1/1.7 inch type)
- Maximum resolution: 4000 x 3000 (12 megapixels)
- Film speed: 80-12800
- Recording medium: SD, SDHC or SDXC memory card

Focusing
- Focus areas: 9 focus points

Shutter
- Shutter speeds: 1/4000s to 15s
- Continuous shooting: 12 frames per second

Viewfinder
- Frame coverage: 80%

Image processing
- Image processor: Digic 6
- White balance: Yes

General
- LCD screen: 3 inches with 922,000 dots
- Dimensions: 109 x 76 x 40mm (4.29 x 2.99 x 1.57 inches)
- Weight: 356 g (13 oz) including battery

The Canon PowerShot G16 is a digital compact camera announced by Canon on August 22, 2013.

== Successor ==
No G16 successor was announced by Canon. This was the last of the original Canon PowerShot G series of cameras without an "X" in the model name.

== New G Series ==
The Canon PowerShot G7 X, G3 X, and G5 X are the new G series compacts announced by Canon; all of these include a 1-inch sensor or larger for better performance and are demarcated from the older models by the "X" after the model number.
