= Canon PowerShot G1 X Mark II =

Digital camera model

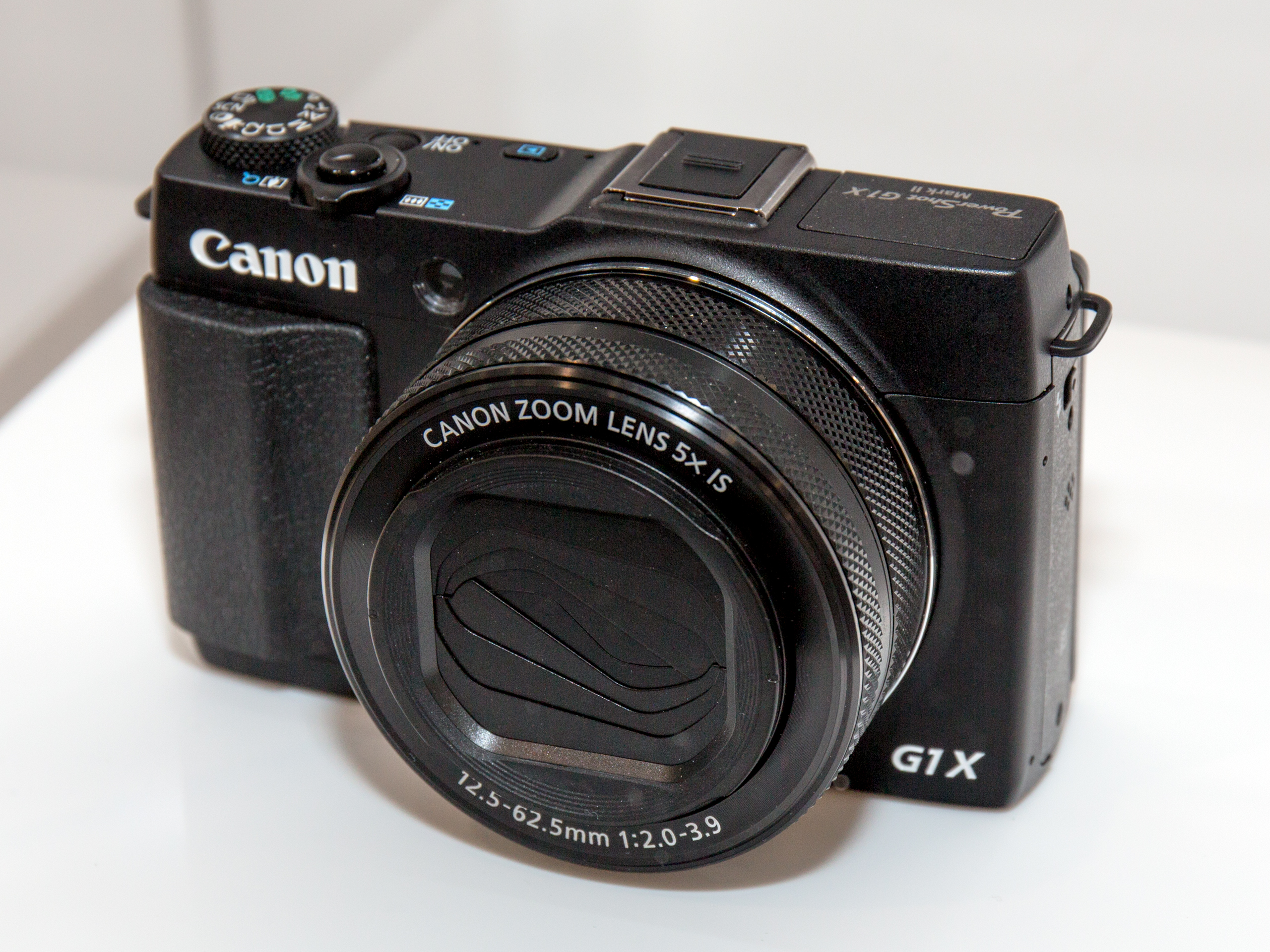

Overview
- Maker: Canon
- Type: Large sensor fixed-lens camera

Lens
- Lens: 24-120mm equivalent
- F-numbers: f/2.0-f/3.9 at the widest

Sensor/medium
- Sensor type: CMOS
- Sensor size: 18.7 x 14mm (1.5 inch type)
- Maximum resolution: 4160 x 3120 (13 megapixels)
- Film speed: 100-12800
- Recording medium: SD, SDHC or SDXC memory card

Focusing
- Focus areas: 31 focus points

Shutter
- Shutter speeds: 1/4000s to 60s
- Continuous shooting: 5 frames per second

Image processing
- Image processor: Digic 6
- White balance: Yes

General
- LCD screen: 3 inches with 1,040,000 dots
- Dimensions: 116 x 74 x 66mm (4.57 x 2.91 x 2.6 inches)
- Weight: 553 g (20 oz) including battery

The Canon PowerShot G1 X Mark II is a large sensor digital compact camera announced by Canon on February 12, 2014. It is the successor to the Canon PowerShot G1 X.

It was replaced by the Canon PowerShot G1 X Mark III in 2017.

== See also ==
- List of large sensor fixed-lens cameras
