= Canon PowerShot G1 X =

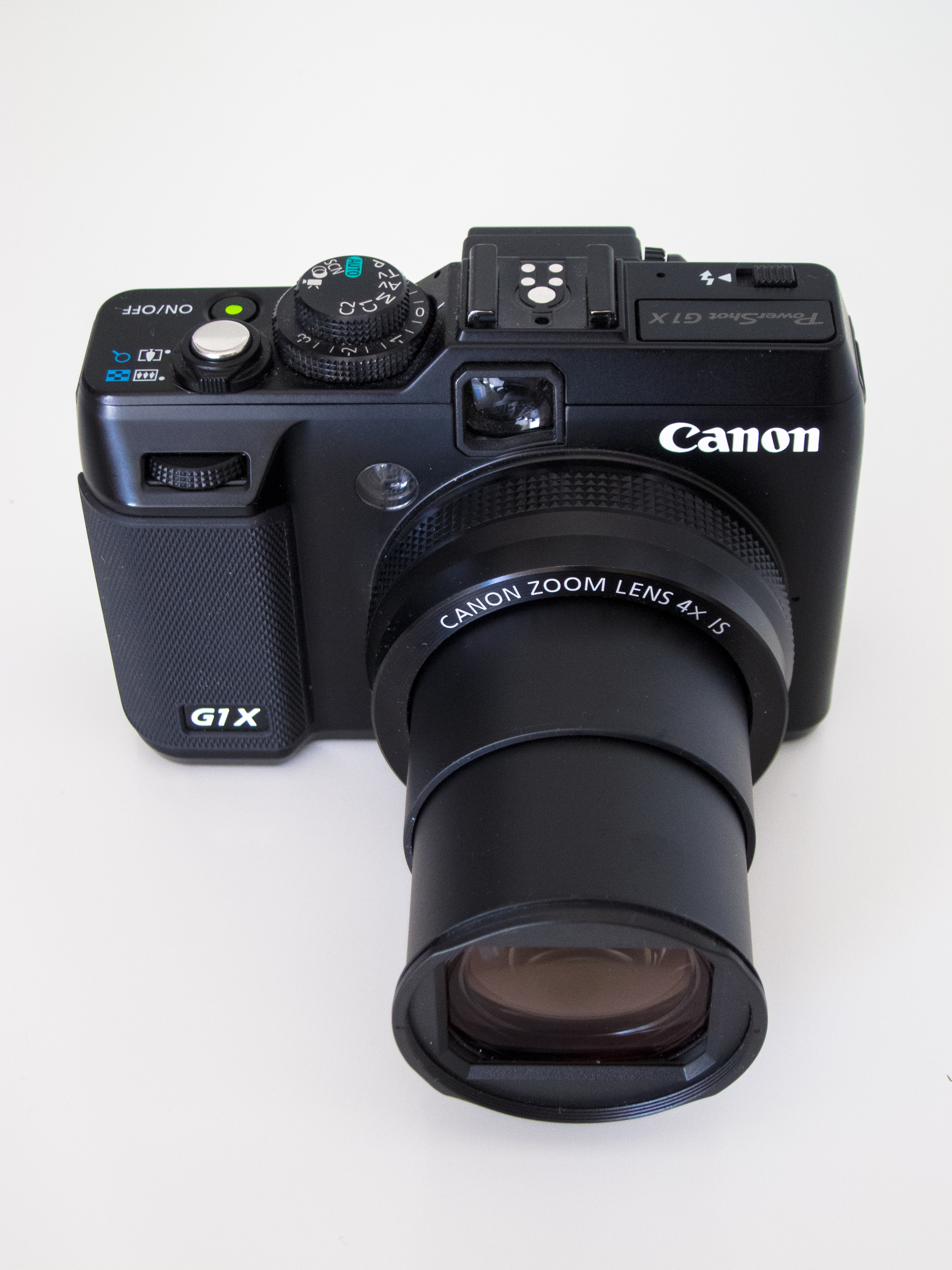

Overview
- Maker: Canon
- Type: Large sensor fixed-lens camera

Lens
- Lens: 28-112mm equivalent
- F-numbers: f/2.8-f/5.8 at the widest

Sensor/medium
- Sensor type: CMOS
- Sensor size: 18.7 × 14mm (1.5 inch type)
- Maximum resolution: 4352 × 3264 (14 megapixels)
- Film speed: 100-12800
- Recording medium: SD, SDHC or SDXC memory card

Focusing
- Focus areas: 9 focus points

Shutter
- Shutter speeds: 1/4000s to 60s
- Continuous shooting: 2 frames per second

Image processing
- Image processor: Digic 5
- White balance: Yes

General
- LCD screen: 3 inches with 920,000 dots
- Dimensions: 117 × 81 × 65 mm (4.61 × 3.19 × 2.56 inches)
- Weight: 534 g (19 oz) including battery

The Canon PowerShot G1 X is a large sensor digital compact camera announced by Canon on January 9, 2012.

It was replaced by the Canon PowerShot G1 X Mark II in Feb 2014.

== See also ==
- List of large sensor fixed-lens cameras
