= Canon PowerShot G5 X =

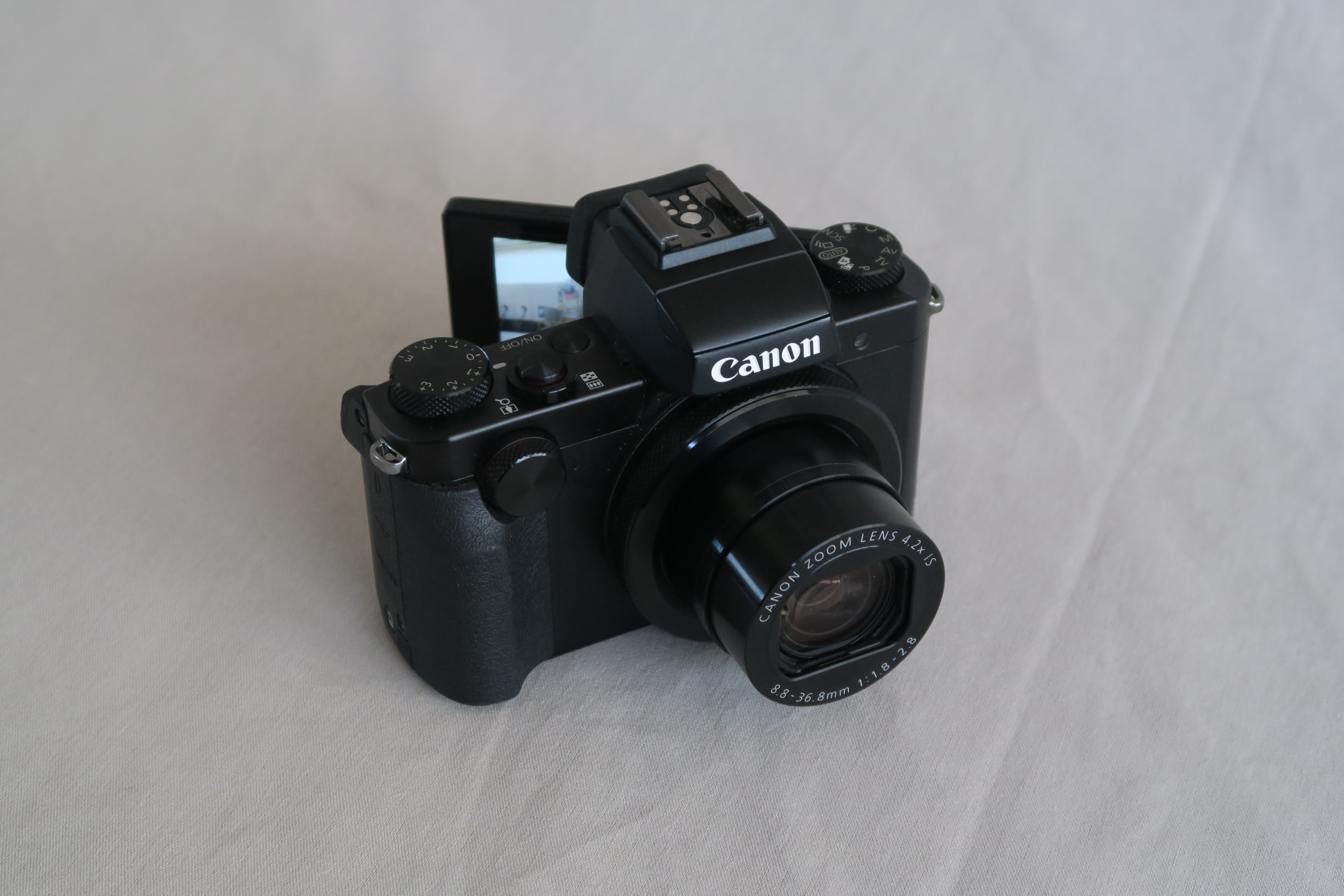

Overview
- Maker: Canon Inc.
- Type: Large sensor fixed-lens camera

Lens
- Lens: 24-100mm equivalent
- F-numbers: f/1.8-f/2.8 at the widest

Sensor/medium
- Sensor type: BSI-CMOS
- Sensor size: 13.2 × 8.8mm (1 inch type)
- Maximum resolution: 5472 × 3648 (20 megapixels)
- Film speed: 125-12800
- Recording medium: SD, SDHC or SDXC memory card

Shutter
- Shutter speeds: 1/2000s to 30s
- Continuous shooting: 5.9 frames per second

Viewfinder
- Frame coverage: 100%

Image processing
- Image processor: DIGIC 6
- White balance: Yes

General
- LCD screen: 3 inches with 1,040,000 dots
- Dimensions: 112 × 76 × 44mm (4.41 × 2.99 × 1.73 inches)
- Weight: 353 g (12 oz) including battery

The Canon PowerShot G5 X is a compact digital camera announced by Canon Inc. on October 13, 2015. It replaced the older G16.

The G5 X is a new design replacing the optical viewfinder with an electronic one and the 1/1.7" sensor with a one-inch one. The camera has a DSLR-like form factor with the viewfinder in the center.

== See also ==
- List of large sensor fixed-lens cameras
