= Canon PowerShot G7 X =

Compact digital camera

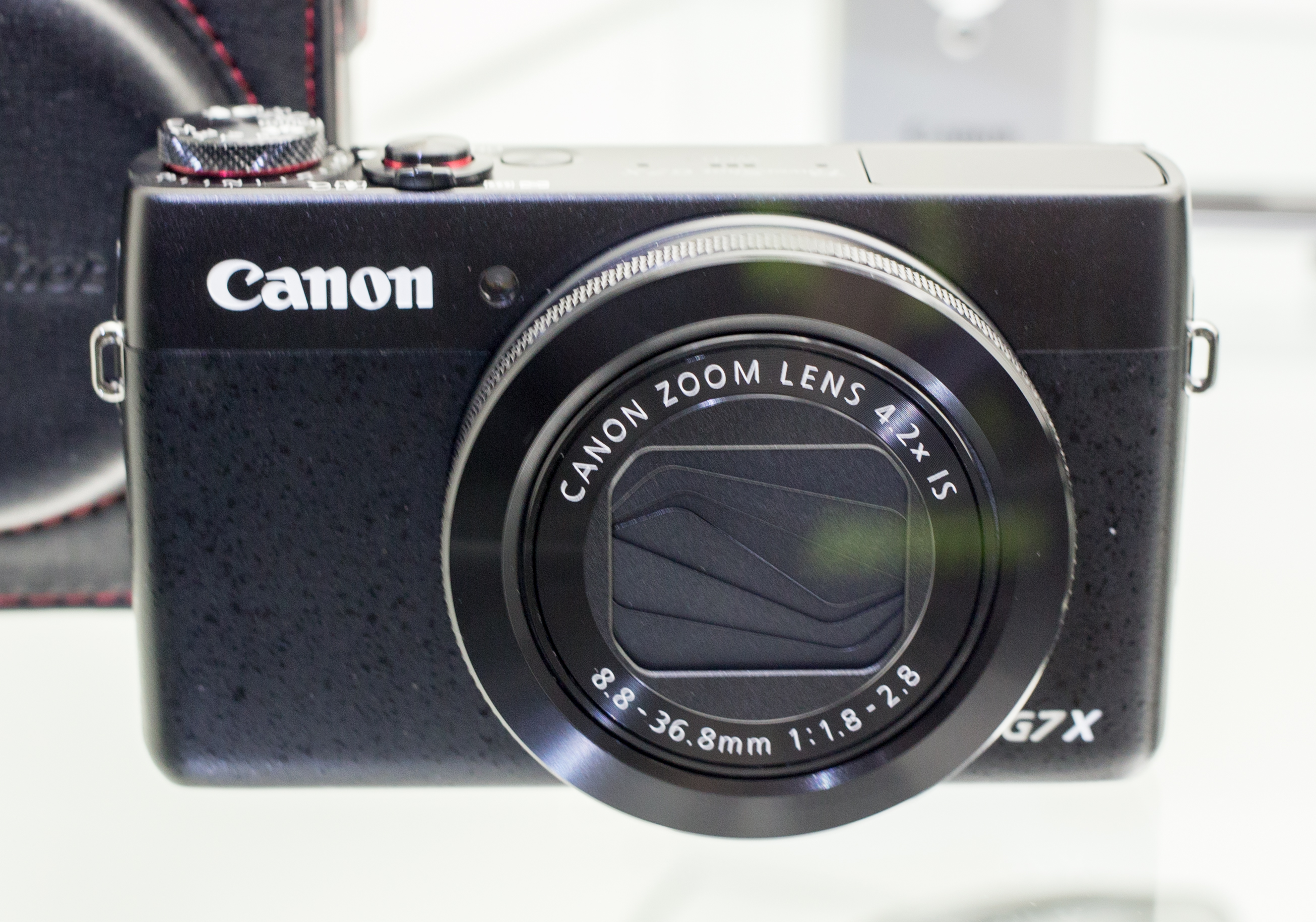

Overview
- Maker: Canon
- Type: Large sensor fixed-lens camera

Lens
- Lens: 24-100 mm equivalent
- F-numbers: f/1.8-f/2.8 at the widest

Sensor/medium
- Sensor type: BSI-CMOS
- Sensor size: 13.2 × 8.8 mm (so-called 1 inch type, actually 0.18 square-inch)
- Maximum resolution: 5472 × 3648 (20 megapixels)
- Film speed: 125-12800
- Recording medium: SD, SDHC, or SDXC memory card

Focusing
- Focus modes: Contrast Detect (sensor), Multi-area, Center, Selective single-point, Single, Continuous, Touch, Face Detection, Live View
- Focus areas: 31 focus points

Shutter
- Shutter speeds: 1/2000s to 40s
- Continuous shooting: 6.5 frames per second

Image processing
- Image processor: DIGIC 6
- White balance: Yes

General
- LCD screen: 3 inches with 1,040,000 dots
- Dimensions: 103 × 60 × 40 mm (4.06 × 2.36 × 1.57 inches)
- Weight: 304 g including battery (0.67 lb / 10.72 oz)

The Canon PowerShot G7 X is a compact digital camera announced by Canon Inc on September 15, 2014. The G7 X model was designed to compete with the Sony Cyber-shot DSC-RX100-series cameras. With the introduction of G7 X, there were three parallel models in the Canon PowerShot G-series: G16, G1 X Mark II, and G7 X.

In 2016, Canon introduced the Canon PowerShot G7 X Mark II with a newer DIGIC 7 processor.

In 2019, Canon introduced the G7 X Mark III.

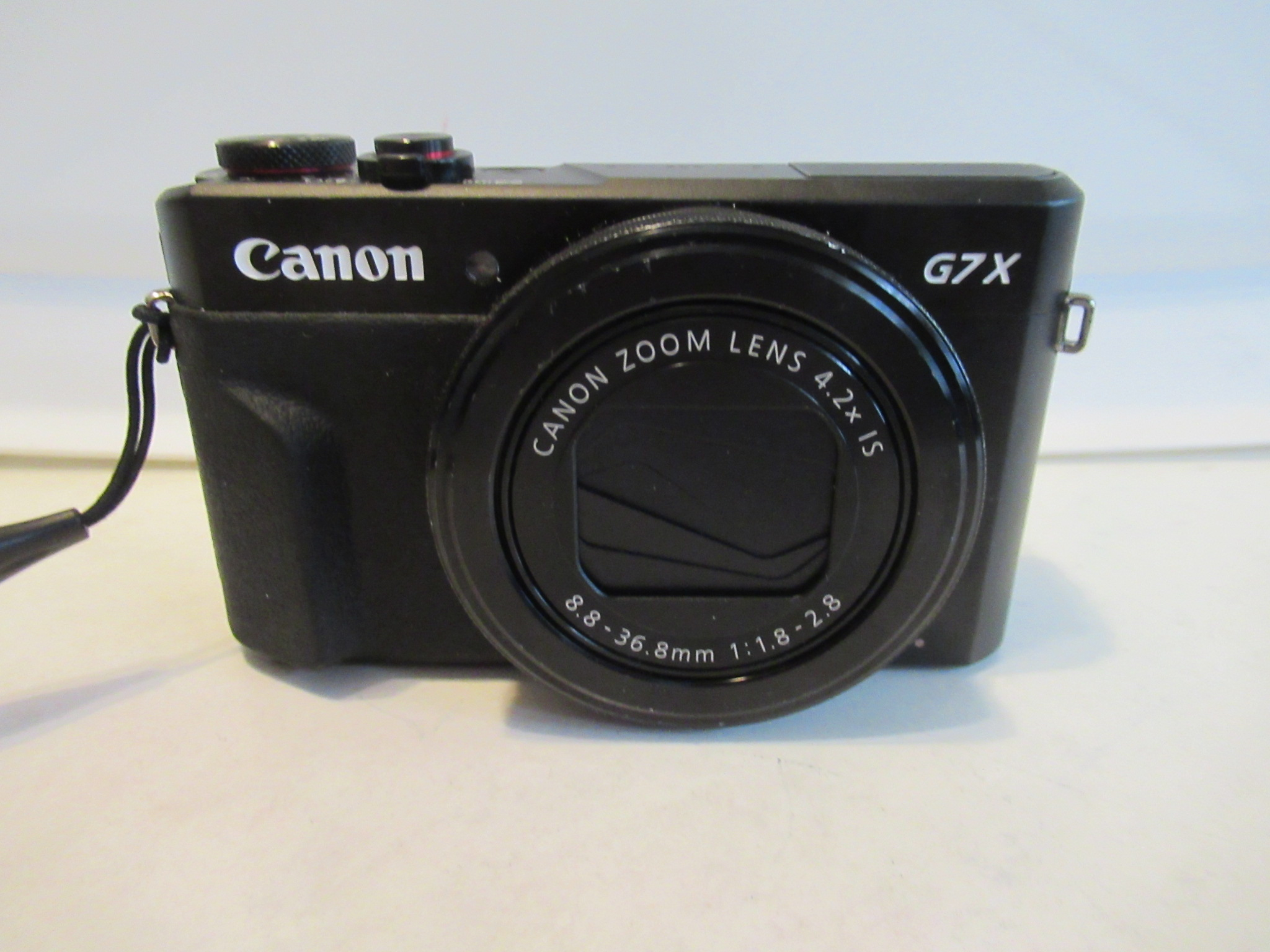
Canon PowerShot G7 X Mark II

== Sample photos (G7 X Mark II) ==
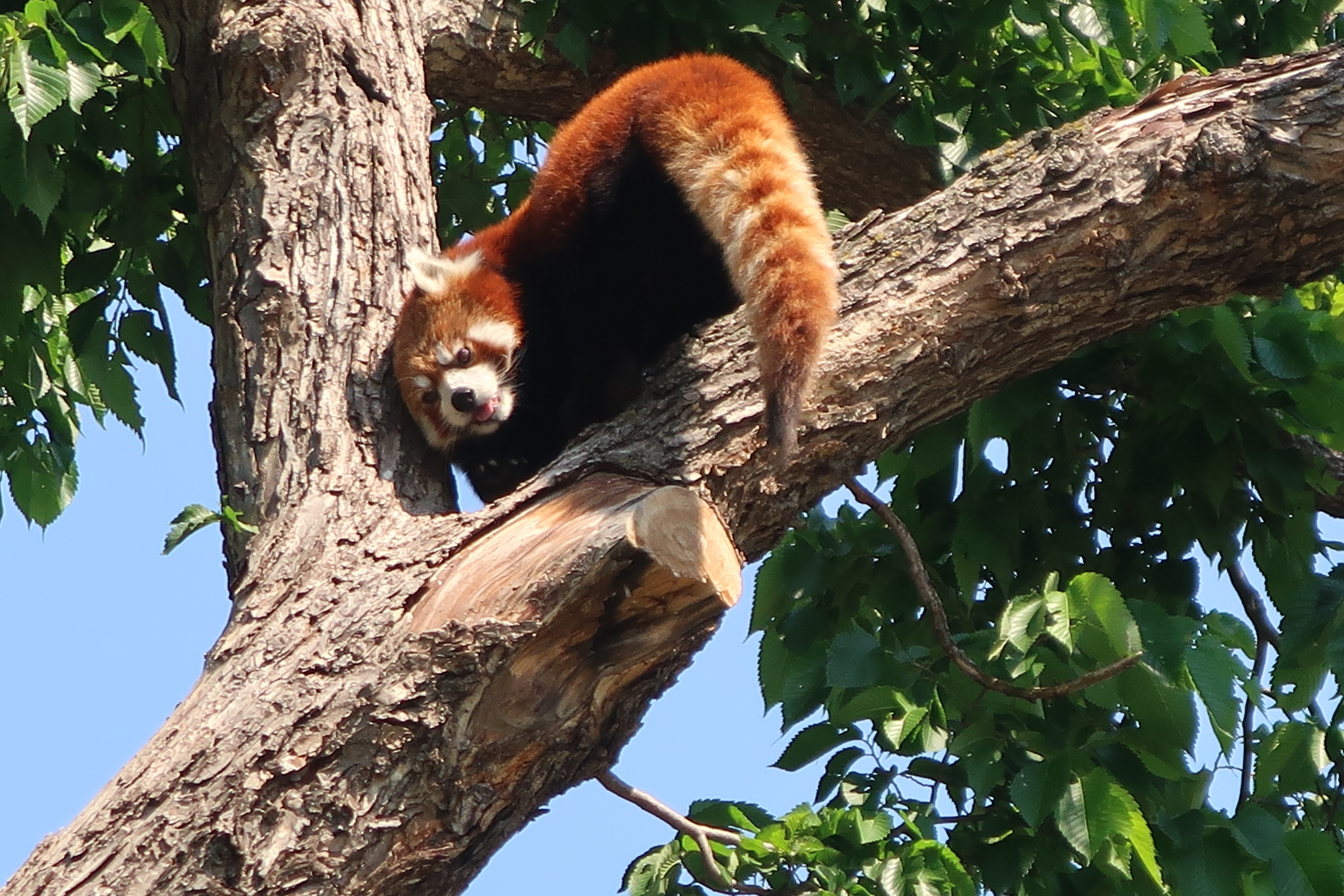
Zoomed in photo (approximately 20x)

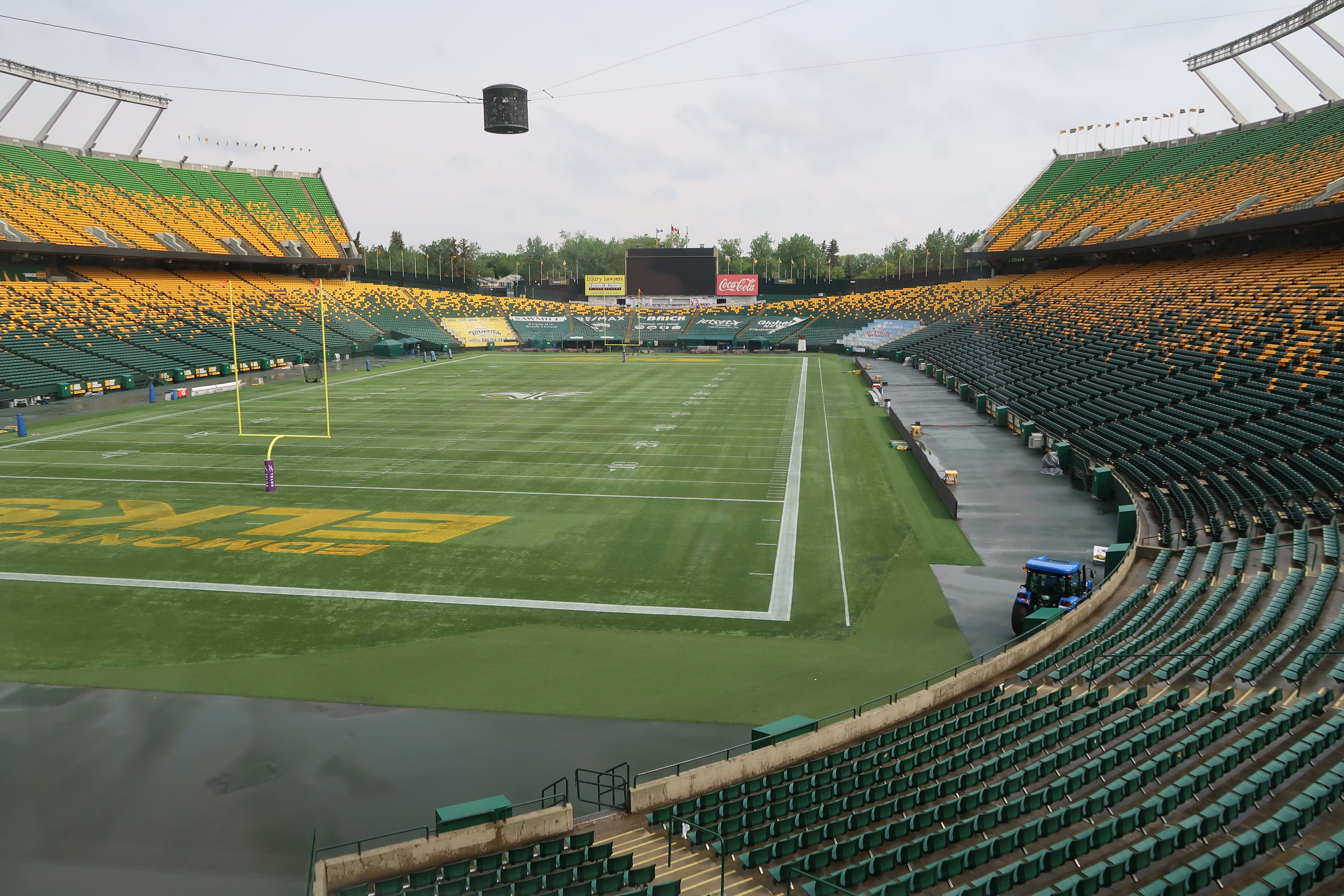
Photo taken under cloudy conditions

== See also ==
- List of large sensor fixed-lens cameras
