= John D McHugh =

John D McHugh (born 1973) is an Irish photojournalist and filmmaker, and is based in London, England.

== Early life ==
McHugh was born in London to Irish parents. Moving back to Ireland when he was an infant, he grew up in a rural farming community. He returned to London in 1997, and in 2002 he began working as a photojournalist. He freelanced for The Associated Press and The Guardian newspaper before becoming a staff photographer at Agence France-Presse in 2005. In 2007 he resigned his position and once again became a freelancer.

== Photography ==
Self-taught, McHugh has worked extensively in Afghanistan since the start of 2006. He was one of the first journalists to cover the Canadian deployment in Kandahar, and witnessed and photographed one of their very first operations to raid a bomb-making facility. The Canadians captured 10 Taliban suspects, and McHugh's photographs caused a controversy in Canada.

He was the first journalist to spend time with British forces after they took command of the southern Afghan province of Helmand in May 2006. His photographs of foot patrols through Lashkar Gah and of British soldiers silhouetted as they stand on a fort built by Alexander the Great were some of the first photographs that the British public saw from Helmand.

In 2007, McHugh embarked on a nine-month embed with US troops in Afghanistan. Just five weeks into his trip, the unit he was with was caught in an ambush. 18 soldiers were killed and 11 wounded. McHugh was also wounded, shot through the chest.

Six months later, he had recovered and returned to Afghanistan. He talks about childhood lessons of getting back on horses that threw him when explaining his reason for returning to Afghanistan after his injury.

== Multimedia Photojournalism and Filmmaking ==
In 2007 McHugh began working with audio and video alongside his photography. He also began writing about his experiences.

In 2008 The Guardian commissioned McHugh to produce a series initially entitled "Fighting Season" but subsequently renamed John D McHugh in Afghanistan which included photography, audio slideshows, short documentary films, and blogs. The project involved spending months living with the soldiers under fire along the border with Pakistan.

== Awards ==
McHugh was awarded a Special Award for Hard News by The Picture Editors Guild in 2005.

In 2007 he won the Frontline Club Award, which focuses on "journalistic integrity, courage and the independence of spirit" for his work in Afghanistan.

2009 saw McHugh's film Combat Outpost' nominated for The Rory Peck Award for News.
