= Canon PowerShot S120 =

Digital camera model

PowerShot S120
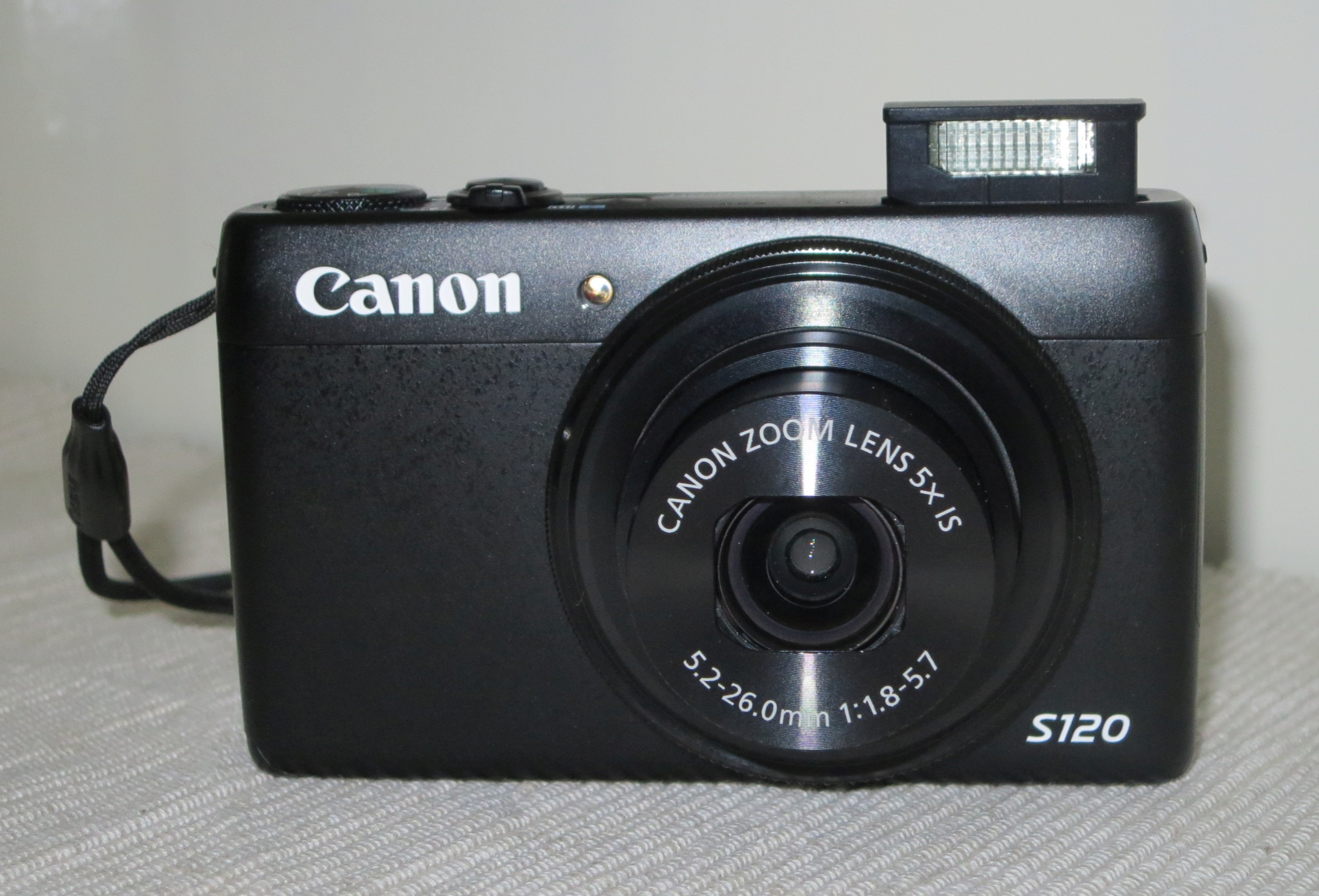

Overview
- Maker: Canon Inc.
- Type: Digital camera
- Intro price: US$449.99

Lens
- Lens: 5.2–26.0 mm f/1.8–f/5.7 (35 mm equivalent: 24–120 mm f/8.3–f/26.3)

Sensor/medium
- Sensor: 1/1.7" BSI-CMOS
- Maximum resolution: 4000 × 3000 (12.1 megapixels)
- Film speed: Auto, ISO 80–12800 (in 1/3-step increments)
- Storage media: Secure Digital card

Focusing
- Focus modes: Single, Continuous, Servo AF/AEl, Manual Focus, Touch Focus

Exposure/metering
- Metering modes: Evaluative, Center-weighted average, Spot

Flash
- Flash: 50 cm – 7 m (wide), 50 cm – 2.3 m (tele)

Shutter
- Shutter: Mechanical and electronic shutter
- Shutter speed range: 1/2500 – 1 sec. (Auto mode), 1/2500 to 250 sec.
- Continuous shooting: Approx. 12.1 frame/s, 9.4 frame/s from 6th shot onwards

Image processing
- White balance: Auto, Daylight, Cloudy, Tungsten, Fluorescent, Fluorescent H, Flash, Underwater, Custom

General
- LCD screen: 3.0-inch (76 mm) TFT color LCD with capacitive touchscreen, 640×480 pixels, 267 dpi (approx. 922,000 dots)
- Battery: Canon NB-6LH Li-Ion
- Optional battery packs: AC Adapter Kit ACK-DC40
- Dimensions: 100.2×59.0×29.0 mm (3.94×2.32×1.14 in) (W * H * D)
- Weight: 217 g (7.7 oz) including battery
- Made in: Japan

Designed as the successor to the Canon PowerShot S110 in the S series of cameras, the Canon PowerShot S120 is a high-end 12.1-megapixel compact digital camera with 0.3 f/-stops wider aperture, 0.7 bits more color depth, improved continuous shooting speeds, resolved Wi-Fi sharing functionality, 60fps HD video recording, lower noise at higher ISO, a better sensor, and the same DIGIC6 as the current G series model for greater image quality. It was announced by Canon on August 22, 2013.

== Features ==
- 12.1 megapixels
- JPEG (Exif 2.3) support
- Raw image file format; one of few "point and shoot" cameras to have raw formatting. (Note: Raw format is not available in Auto, Low Light, and SCN modes. Raw is available in Program, Tv (shutter priority), Av (aperture priority), Manual, and Custom modes)
- ISO sensitivity 80–12800 (in 1/3-step increments) and auto (up to ISO 1600).
- Full manual control
- Customizable Control Ring to control ISO, shutter speed, aperture, focus, or exposure compensation
- Five photo aspect ratios: 16:9, 3:2, 4:3, 1:1, 4:5
- Video features
  - Recording Standard, Color Accent, Color Swap: 1920 × 1080 (60 / 30 frame/s), 1280 × 720 (30 frame/s), 640 × 480 (30)
  - Recording Miniature Effect: 1280 × 720 (6 / 3 / 1.5 frame/s), 640 × 480 (6 / 3 / 1.5 frame/s)
  - Recording Super Slow Motion: 640 × 480 (120 frame/s), 320 × 240 (240 frame/s)
  - Recording Full HD Star Time Lapse Movie: 1920 × 1080 (15 frame/s)
- Continuous shooting in P mode: ~12.1 shot/s, 9.4 shot/s from 6th shot. ~5.5 shot/s with AF and LV.
- Multi-touch capacitive touchscreen
- Wi-Fi for internet connectivity or image archival

== Improvements ==
- DIGIC 6 processor
- increased battery capacity (230 shots)
- nearly double the screen resolution to 640×480 pixels (267 dpi, VGA resolution) - the first for a PowerShot S-series ultra-compact.
- ECO mode turns off the LCD much sooner to help conserve battery power.

== Disadvantages ==
- S120 is 9% larger than the S110
- S120 is 10% thicker than the S110
- S120 is 19 grams heavier than the S110

== Successor ==
Canon announced the G9X as a follow-up camera to the Canon S series that is capable to compete with Sony's RX100 series compact camera. The camera was announced on October 13, 2015.

== Sample photos ==
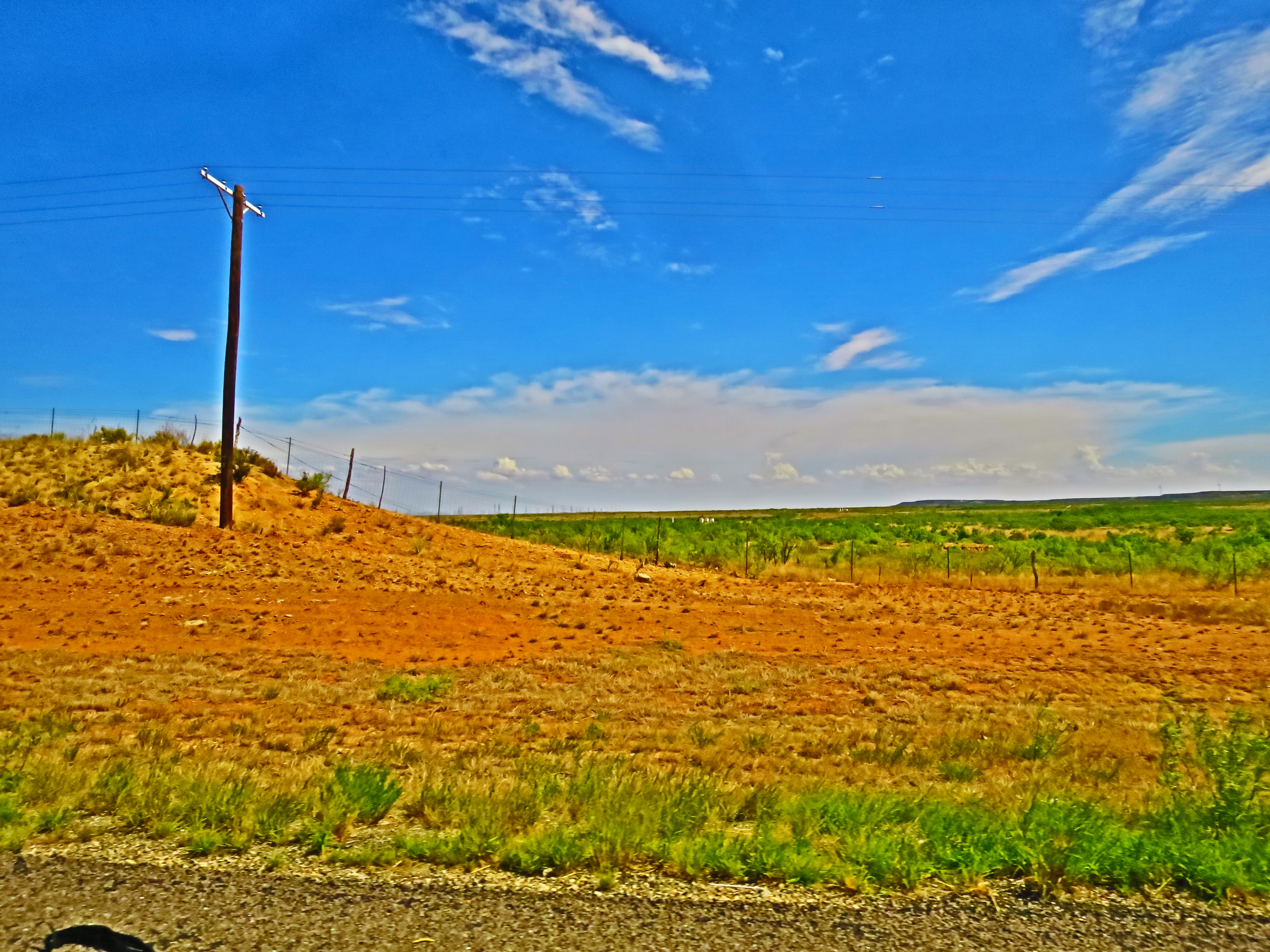
Camera-applied "Super vivid" effect on a landscape

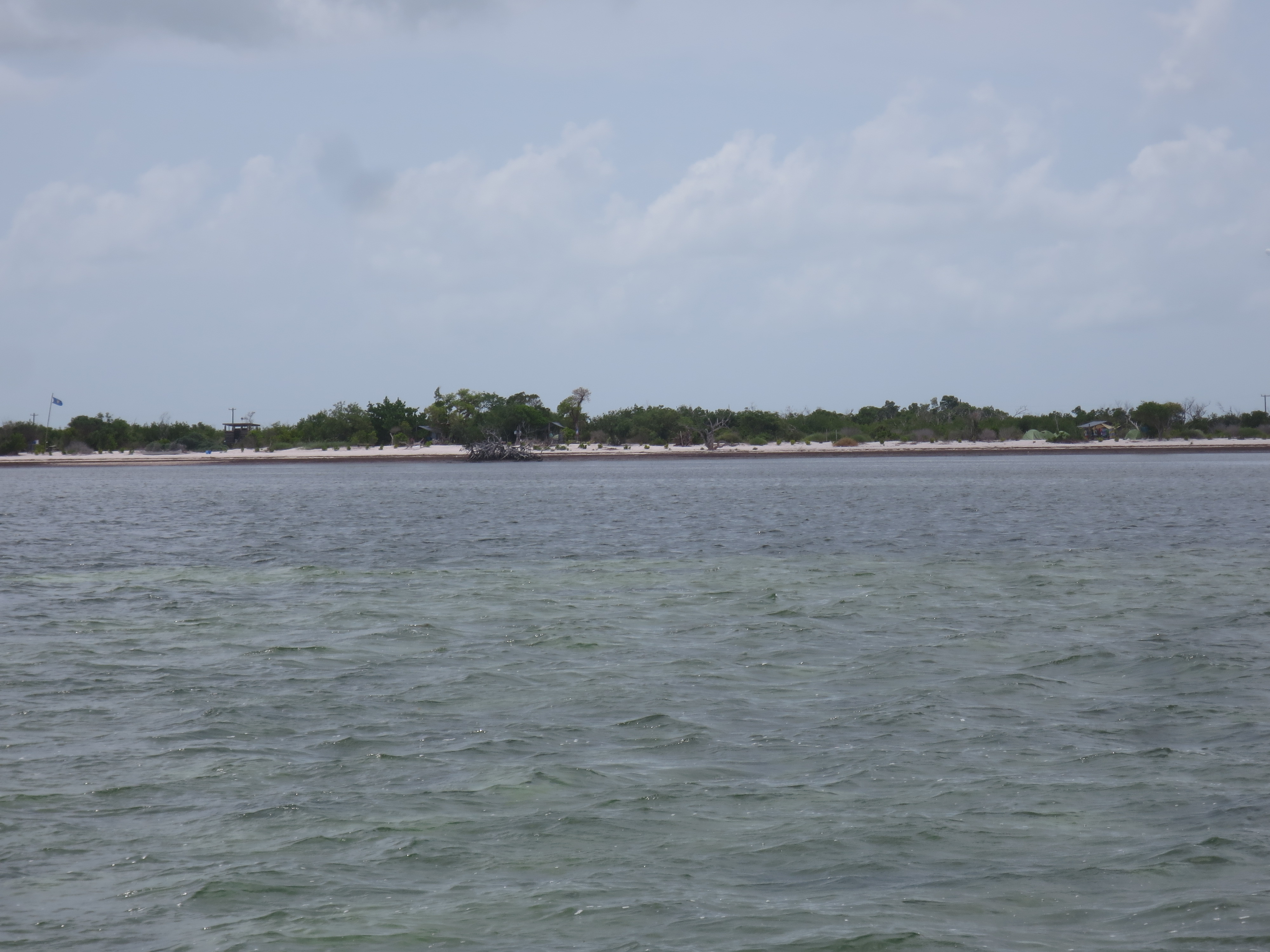
View of the ocean

Preceded by S110	Canon Powershot Compact S series August 2013 - February 2014	Succeeded by S200
