= Canon EOS R3 =

2021 full-frame mirrorless camera

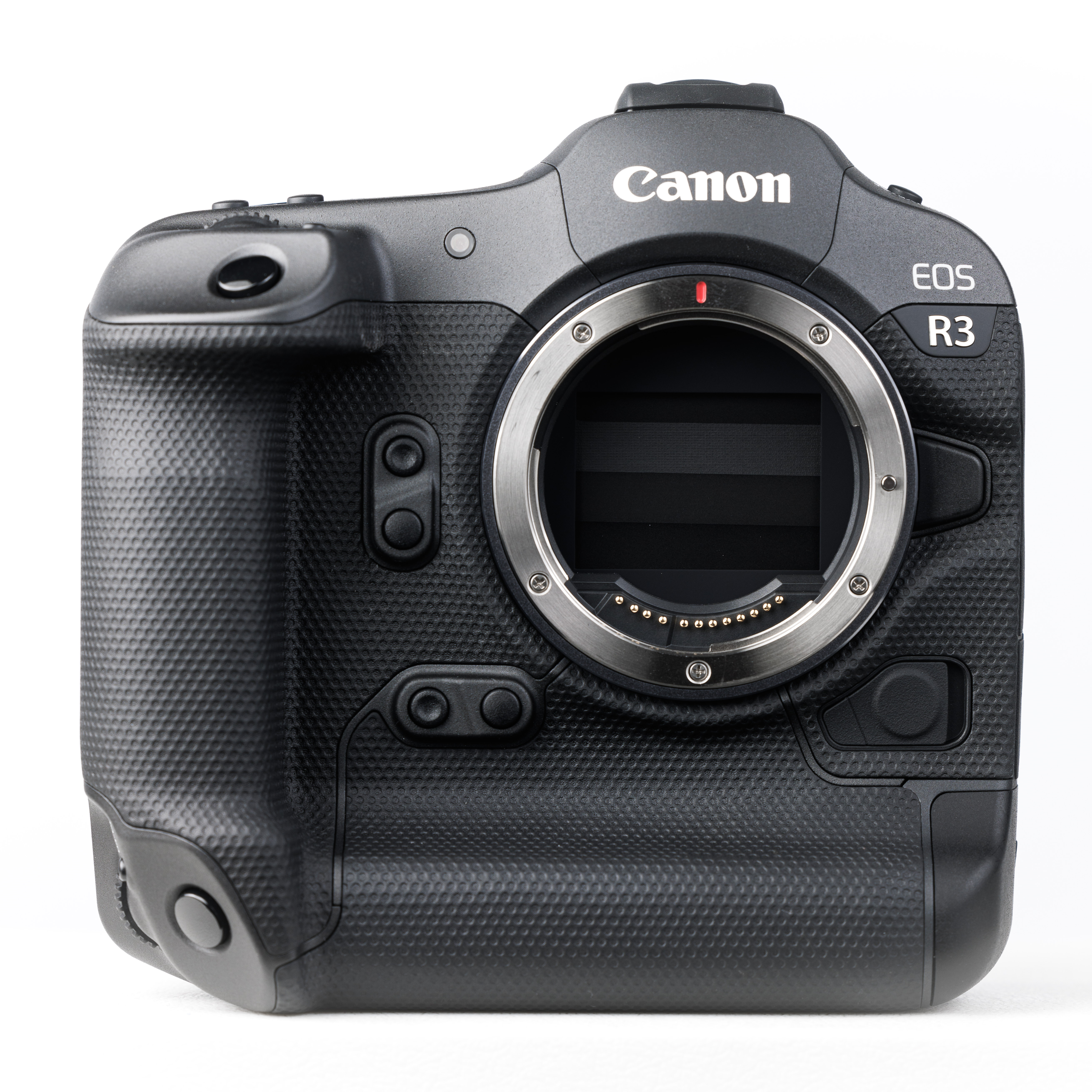
- Canon EOS R3

Overview
- Maker: Canon Inc.
- Type: Mirrorless interchangeable lens camera
- Released: November 27, 2021; 4 years ago
- Intro price: $5999 (body only)

Lens
- Lens mount: Canon RF

Sensor/medium
- Sensor: Back-illuminated stacked Dual-pixel CMOS sensor
- Sensor size: Full-frame (36 × 24 mm)
- Maximum resolution: 6000 x 4000 (24.1 MP)
- Film speed: ISO 100 – 102,400 expandable to 50 – 204,800
- Recording medium: Dual slots: CFexpress and SDXC (UHS-II)

Focusing
- Focus: Dual-pixel CMOS AF

Shutter
- Shutter speeds: 30s - 1/64000s
- Continuous shooting: 12 fps (mechanical); 30 fps (electronic); 195 fps (custom mode)

Viewfinder
- Viewfinder magnification: 0.76
- Frame coverage: 100%

Image processing
- Image processor: DIGIC X

General
- Video recording: Up to 6K 60p Raw Video with Canon Log3
- LCD screen: 3.2”
- Battery: LP-E19
- Dimensions: 150 mm × 142.6 mm × 87.2 mm (5.91 in × 5.61 in × 3.43 in)
- Weight: 822 g (29.0 oz) (body only), 1,015 g (35.8 oz) (incl. battery and memory card)
- Latest firmware: 1.8.0 / 20 September 2024; 2 years ago
- Made in: Japan

Chronology
- Successor: Canon EOS R1

The Canon EOS R3 is a 24 megapixel full-frame mirrorless interchangeable-lens camera officially announced by Canon on 14 September 2021 alongside two RF mount lenses. The camera is available as body only with a MSRP of US$5,999.00.

The camera marks the return of eye-controlled autofocus, a feature not seen in a Canon camera since the Canon EOS 30V in April 2004.

Even though the camera was not officially released to the public, it was already used at the 2020 Summer Olympics in Japan.

The EOS R3 won Camera Grand Prix 2022 Editors Choice Technology Award.

In July 2022, EOS R3 firmware update 1.2.0, enabled this camera to shoot up to 50 frames at a custom high-speed continuous mode rate of 195 frames per second with full resolution in JPEG, HEIF or RAW format.

== Features ==
- 24.1-megapixel Back-illuminated stacked CMOS sensor: highspeed read-out image sensor designed to reduce rolling shutter
- Autofocus vehicle, animal and people recognition and tracking
- “Eye Control AF“: The focus point can be set by looking at it in the viewfinder
- Multi-Function Shoe: A new hotshoe design compatible with a variety of accessories including an XLR microphone adapter
- Magnesium alloy with a built-in vertical grip
- Weather and dust resistance equivalent to EOS-1D camera models
- Dual card slots (CFexpress and UHS-II SD memory cards)
- DIGIC X image processor
- In-camera image stabilization for up to 8 stops
- 6K 60p internal raw video, downsampled 4K videos with Canon Log3 profile
- Electronic viewfinder and vari-angle LCD touchscreen
- Wired LAN and 5 GHz Wi-Fi connectivity
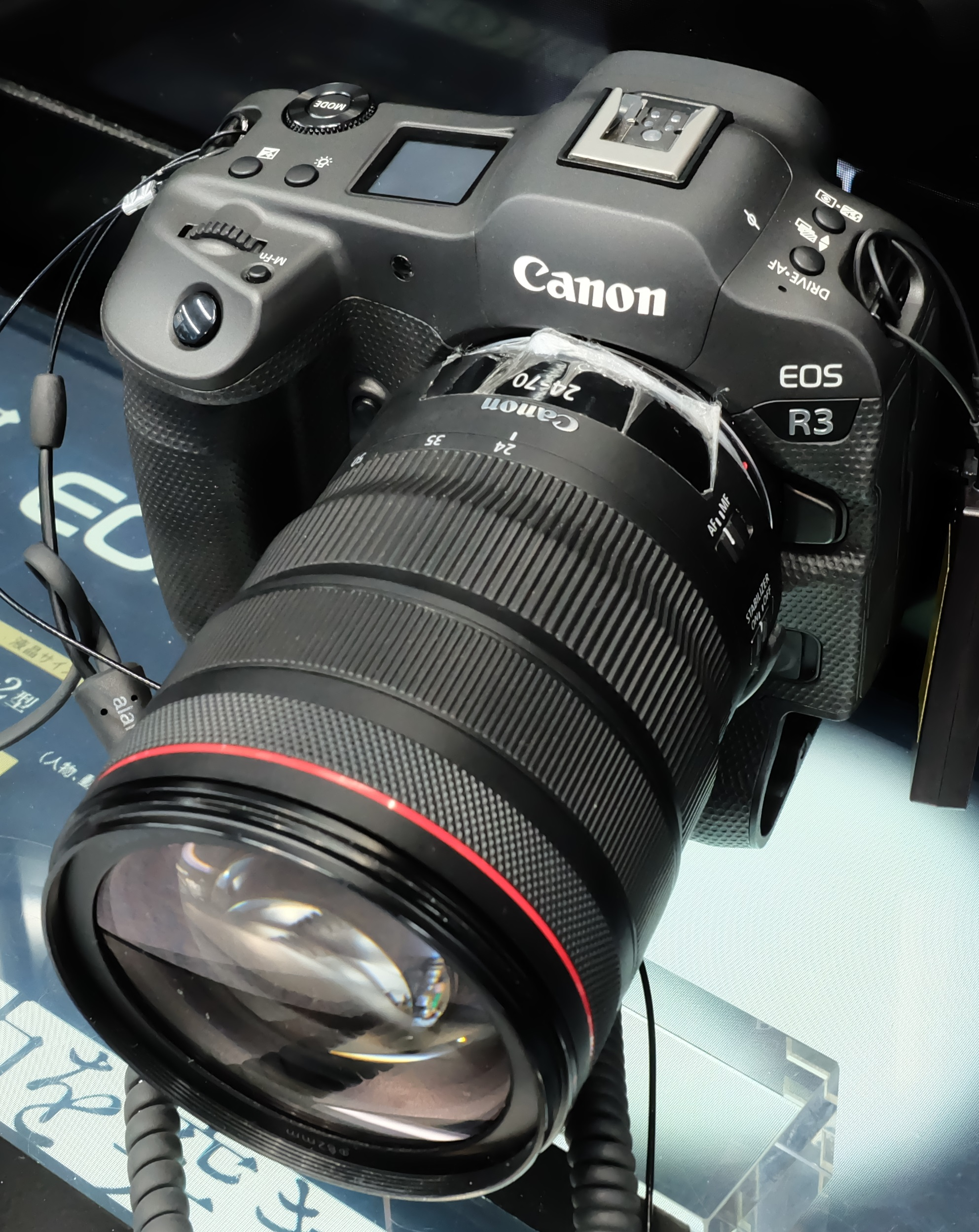

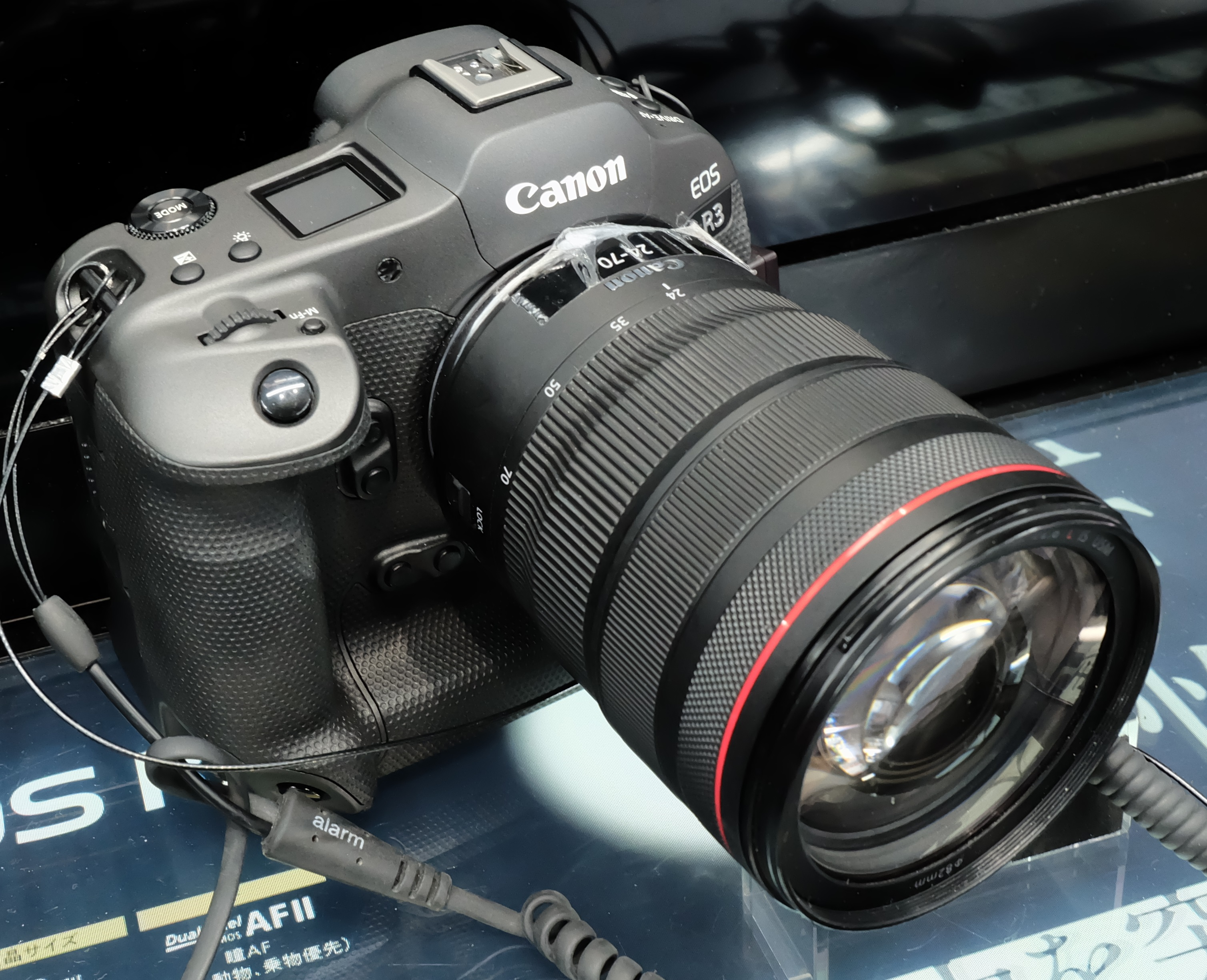

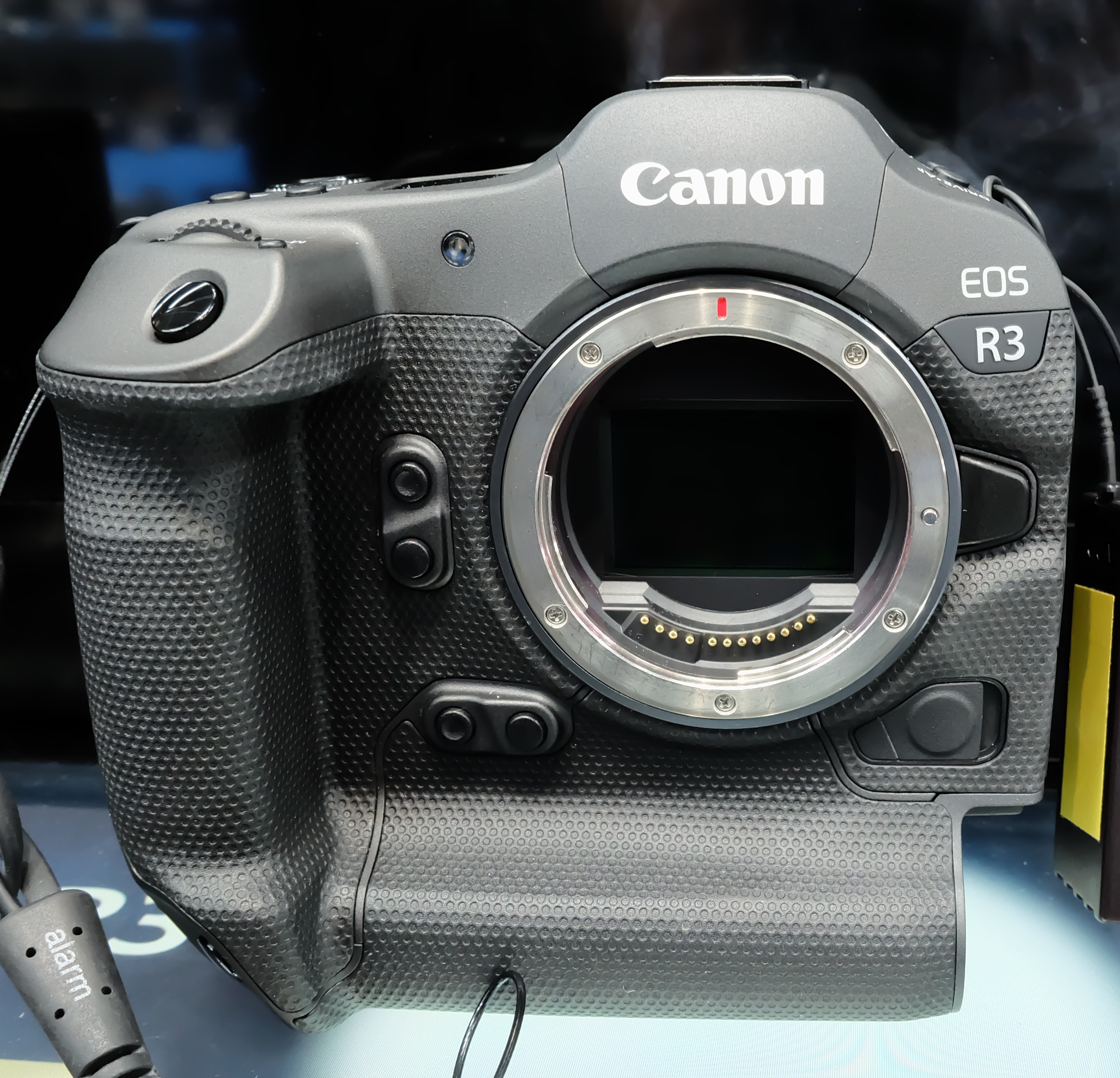

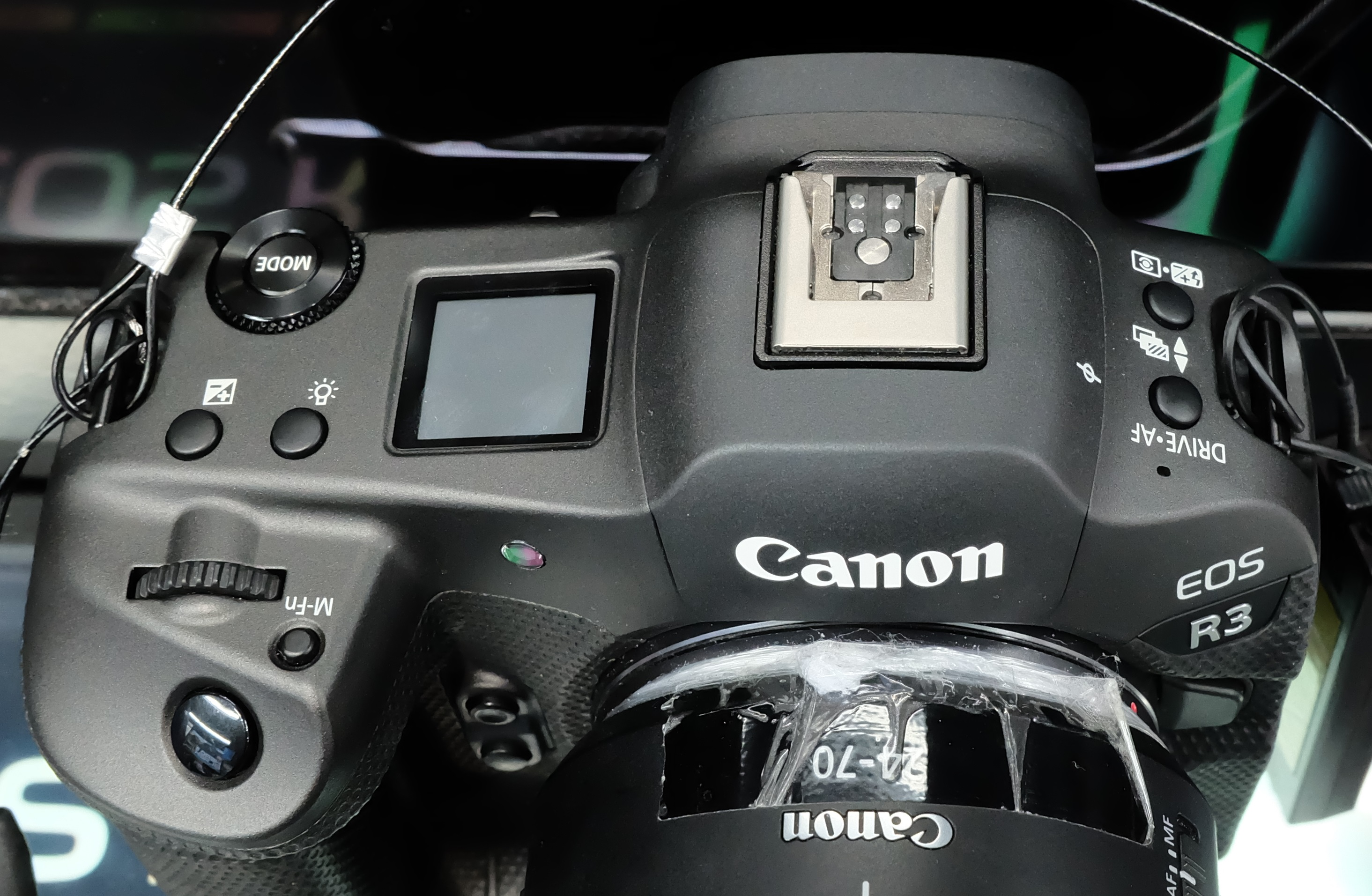

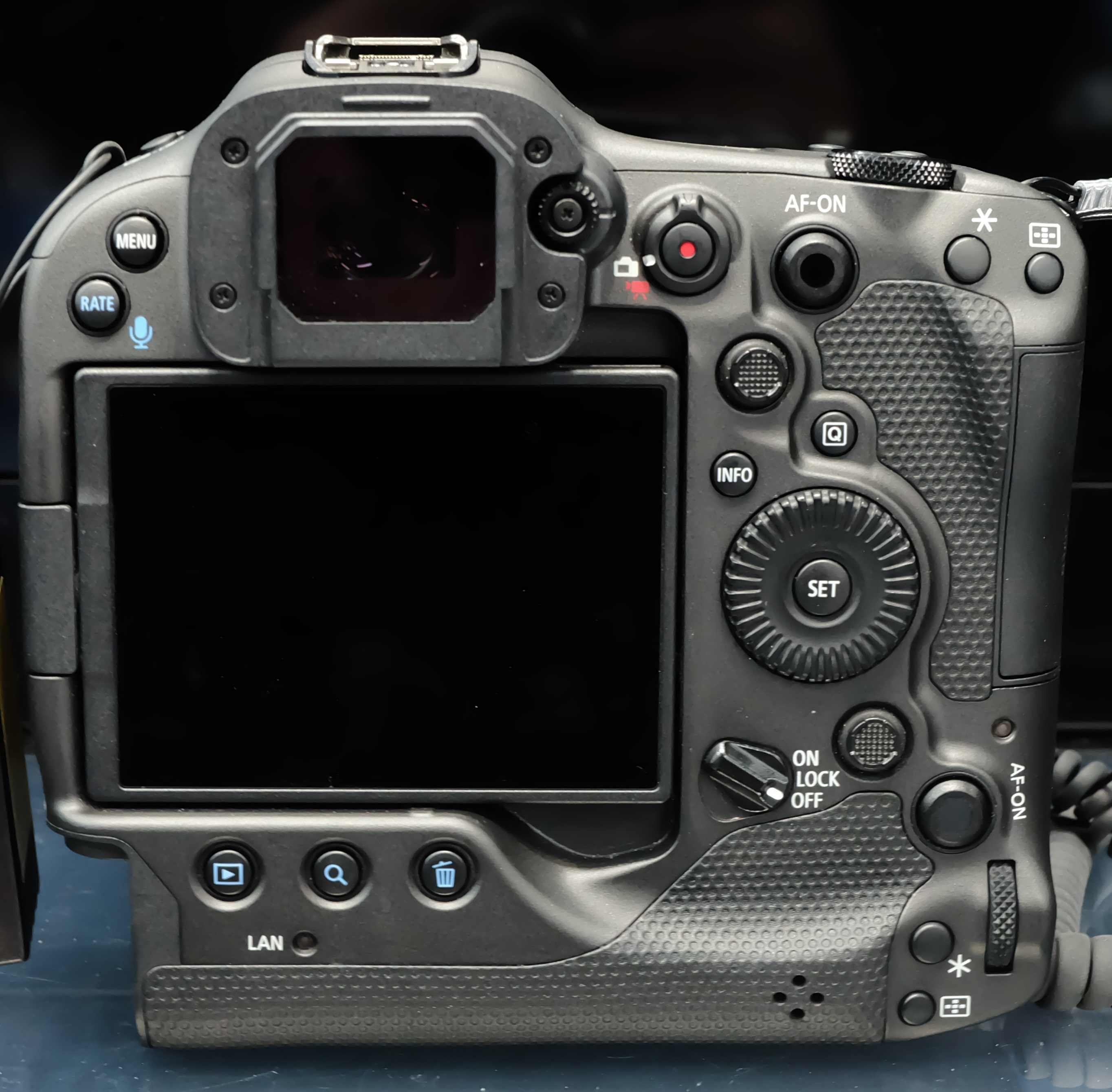

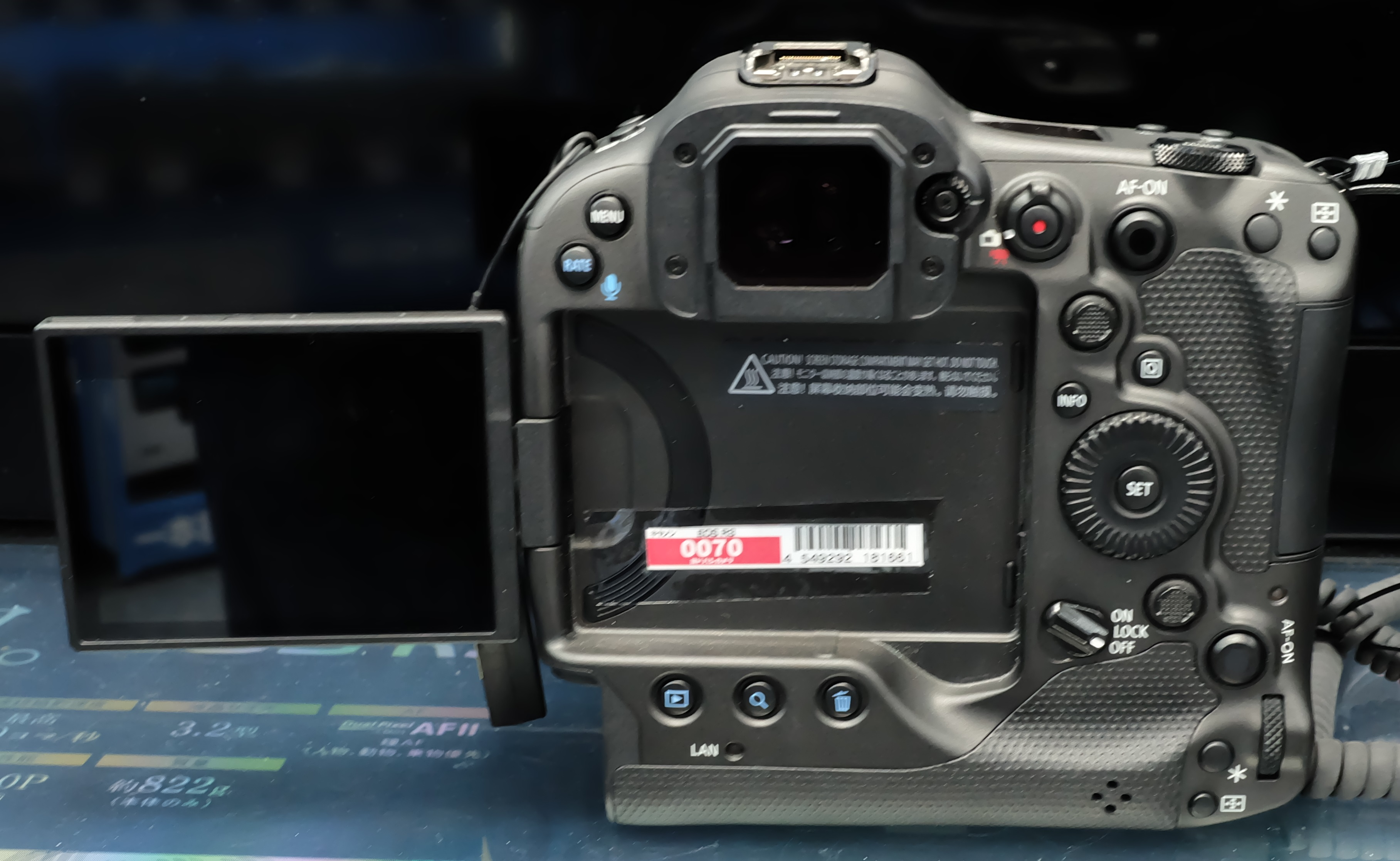

== See also ==
other Canon professional mirrorless cameras from the same period:

- Canon EOS R1
- Canon EOS R5 Mark II

Sensor	Class	12	13	14	15	16	17	18	19	20	21	22	23	24	25	26
Full-frame	Flagship														_{m} R1 ^{ATS}	
Full-frame	Professional											_{m} R3 ^{ATS}				
Full-frame	Professional										R5 ^{ATSR}				_{m} R5 Mk II ^{ATSR}	
Full-frame	Professional											_{m} R5 C ^{ATCR}				
Full-frame	Advanced										R6 ^{ATS}		_{m} R6 Mk II ^{ATS}			_{m} R6 Mk III ^{ATS}
Full-frame	Advanced															R6 V ^{ATS}
Full-frame	Advanced									Ra ^{AT}						
Full-frame	Advanced								R ^{AT}							
Full-frame	Midrange													_{m} R8 ^{AT}		_{m} R8 Mk II ^{ATS}
Full-frame	Entry/mid								RP ^{AT}							
APS-C	Advanced												_{m} R7 ^{ATS}			
APS-C	Midrange						M5 ^{FT}						_{m} R10 ^{AT}			
APS-C	Entry/mid		_{x} M ^{T}	M2 ^{T}	M3 ^{FT}			M6 ^{FT}		M6 Mk II ^{FT}						
APS-C	Entry/mid								M50 ^{AT}		M50 Mk II ^{AT}			_{m} R50 ^{AT}		
APS-C	Entry/mid															_{m} R50 V ^{AT}
APS-C	Entry					M10 ^{FT}		M100 ^{FT}		M200 ^{FT}				R100		
Sensor	Class															
Sensor	Class	12	13	14	15	16	17	18	19	20	21	22	23	24	25	26
