= Canon EOS R5 Mark II =

2024 full-frame mirrorless camera

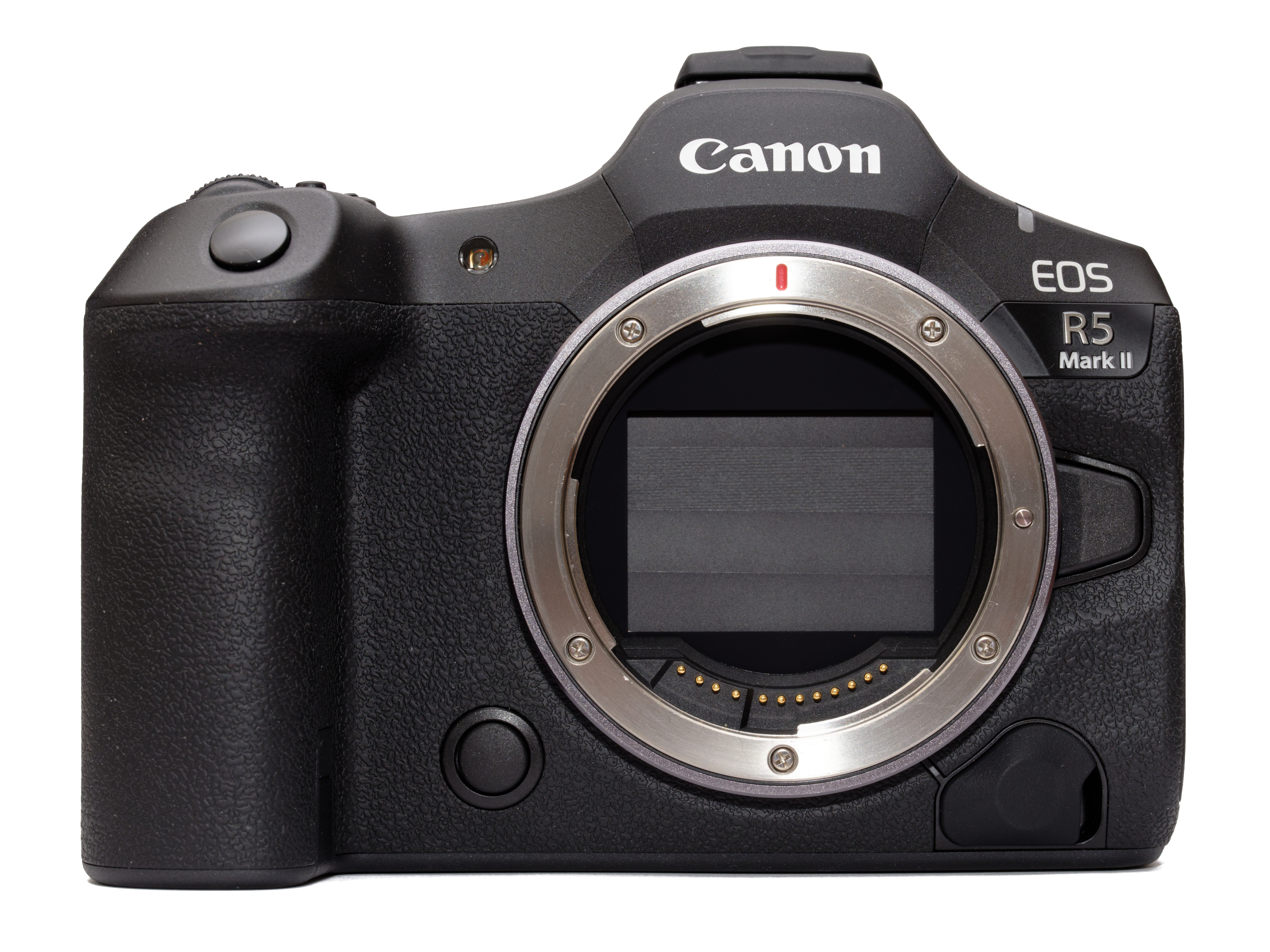

Overview
- Maker: Canon Inc.
- Type: Mirrorless
- Released: 20 August 2024
- Intro price: $4,299 (body only) $5,399 (with RF 24-105mm f/4 L IS USM kit)

Lens
- Lens mount: Canon RF
- Lens: Interchangeable

Sensor/medium
- Sensor type: Stacked CMOS
- Sensor size: Full-frame (36 × 24 mm)
- Maximum resolution: 8192×5464 pixels (~45 MP)
- Film speed: ISO 100 – 51,200 (expandable to 50 – 102,400)
- Recording medium: Dual slots: CFexpress (Type B) and SDXC (UHS-II)

Focusing
- Focus: Canon Dual Pixel CMOS AF II

Flash
- Flash: Hot shoe

Shutter
- Shutter: Mechanical focal-plane Electronic first-curtain Electronic
- Shutter speed range: 30s – 1/8000s (mechanical); 30s – 1/32000s (electronic)
- Continuous shooting: 12 fps mechanical 30 fps electronic

Viewfinder
- Electronic viewfinder: 0.5 in 5.76-million-dot OLED
- Viewfinder magnification: 0.76×
- Frame coverage: 100%

Image processing
- Image processor: DIGIC X, DIGIC Accelerator

General
- Video recording: 8K up to 60fps 4K up to 120fps
- LCD screen: 3.2 in 2.1-million-dot touchscreen, fully articulating, live preview
- Battery: LP-E6P, LP-E6NH, LP-E6N; 340 shots (EVF); 630 shots (LCD)
- Optional battery packs: BG-R20, BG-R20EP, CF-R20EP, BG-R10 battery grip
- AV port: HDMI Type-A
- Data port(s): USB 3.2 Gen2 Type-C, Wi-Fi 6E, Bluetooth 5.3
- Body features: Weather-sealed
- Dimensions: 138.4×98.4×88.4 mm (5.45×3.87×3.48 in)
- Weight: 656 g (23.1 oz) (body only), 746 g (26.3 oz) (incl. battery and memory card)
- Latest firmware: 1.3 / 13 May 2026; 15 days ago
- Made in: Japan

Chronology
- Predecessor: Canon EOS R5

References
- "Shop Canon EOS R5 Mark II Body". Canon U.S.A, Inc. 2025-10-01.

The Canon EOS R5 Mark II is a full-frame mirrorless interchangeable-lens camera produced by Canon. It was announced as the successor to the Canon EOS R5 on July 17, 2024.

== Features ==
- 45.0 megapixel full-frame backside-illuminated stacked sensor
- DIGIC X processor with new DIGIC Accelerator chip
- 8K raw video recording at up to 59.94 fps
- 100% autofocus coverage
- 5,850 user-selectable autofocus points for still images
- High-speed continuous shooting of up to 12 fps with mechanical shutter; up to 30 fps with the electronic (silent) shutter
- 5-axis in-body image stabilization which can provide up to 8.5 stops of shake correction
- Dual card slots (CFexpress and UHS-II SD memory cards)
- 0.5" 5.76 million dots OLED electronic viewfinder with 120 fps refresh rate and vari-angle LCD touchscreen
- weather resistant

== See also ==
other weather resistant Canon mirrorless cameras from the same period:

- Canon EOS R6 Mark II
- Canon EOS R7
- Canon EOS R8

other Canon professional mirrorless cameras from the same period:

- Canon EOS R1
- Canon EOS R3

Sensor	Class	12	13	14	15	16	17	18	19	20	21	22	23	24	25	26
Full-frame	Flagship														_{m} R1 ^{ATS}	
Full-frame	Professional											_{m} R3 ^{ATS}				
Full-frame	Professional										R5 ^{ATSR}				_{m} R5 Mk II ^{ATSR}	
Full-frame	Professional											_{m} R5 C ^{ATCR}				
Full-frame	Advanced										R6 ^{ATS}		_{m} R6 Mk II ^{ATS}			_{m} R6 Mk III ^{ATS}
Full-frame	Advanced															R6 V ^{ATS}
Full-frame	Advanced									Ra ^{AT}						
Full-frame	Advanced								R ^{AT}							
Full-frame	Midrange													_{m} R8 ^{AT}		
Full-frame	Entry/mid								RP ^{AT}							
APS-C	Advanced												_{m} R7 ^{ATS}			
APS-C	Midrange						M5 ^{FT}						_{m} R10 ^{AT}			
APS-C	Entry/mid		_{x} M ^{T}	M2 ^{T}	M3 ^{FT}			M6 ^{FT}		M6 Mk II ^{FT}						
APS-C	Entry/mid								M50 ^{AT}		M50 Mk II ^{AT}			_{m} R50 ^{AT}		
APS-C	Entry/mid															_{m} R50 V ^{AT}
APS-C	Entry					M10 ^{FT}		M100 ^{FT}		M200 ^{FT}				R100		
Sensor	Class															
Sensor	Class	12	13	14	15	16	17	18	19	20	21	22	23	24	25	26
