= Canon EOS R1 =

2024 full-frame mirrorless camera

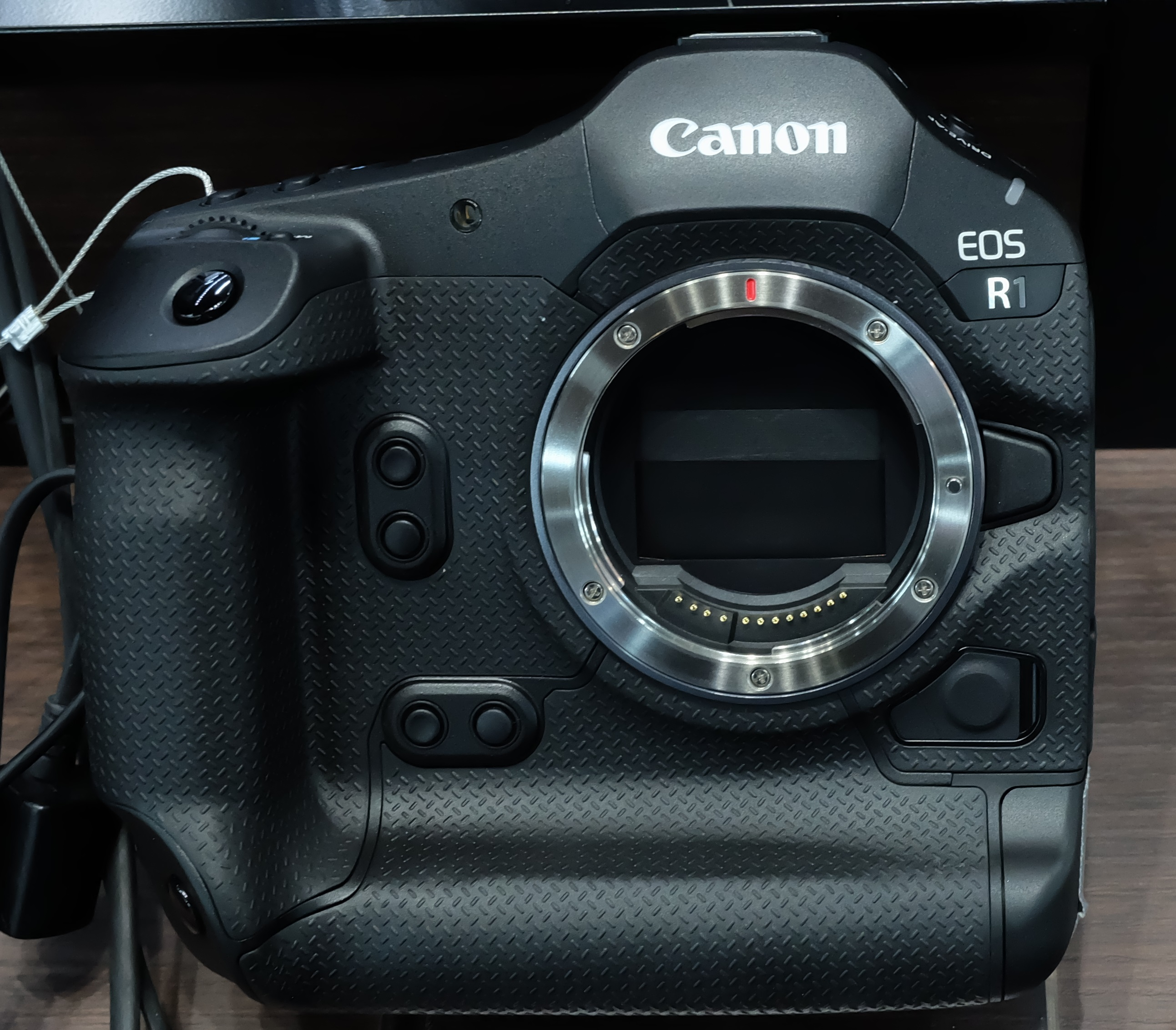

Overview
- Maker: Canon Inc.
- Type: Full-frame mirrorless interchangeable lens camera
- Released: 29 November 2024; 19 months ago
- Intro price: US$6,299.00 (body only) ¥1,089,000

Lens
- Lens mount: Canon RF
- Lens: Interchangeable

Sensor/medium
- Sensor type: Stacked CMOS
- Sensor size: Full-frame (36 × 24 mm)
- Maximum resolution: 6000 × 4000 (24.2 effective megapixels)
- Film speed: 100 - 102400 expandable to (L1) 50 (H1) 204800 (H2) 409600
- Recording medium: 2 × CFexpress Type B

Focusing
- Focus: Dual-Pixel 4897 Point Cross-Type

Exposure/metering
- Exposure modes: Program; Shutter-Priority; Aperture-Priority; Manual

Shutter
- Frame rate: 40fps
- Shutter: Mechanical Focal Plane Shutter and Electronic Rolling Shutter
- Shutter speeds: 1/64,000 to 30 Seconds, 1/16,000 to 30 Seconds in Manual Mode, 1/16,000 to 30 Seconds in Shutter Priority Mode
- Continuous shooting: 40 fps electronic shutter 12 fps mechanical shutter

Viewfinder
- Viewfinder: 9.44 million dot EVF
- Viewfinder magnification: 0.9×
- Frame coverage: 100%

Image processing
- Image processor: DIGIC Accelerator and DIGIC X
- White balance: Auto (2 variants); daylight; shade; cloudy/twilight/sunset; tungsten light; white fluorescent; color temperature (2500‑10000 K); custom (5 variants)

General
- Video recording: 6K 60p raw internal recording 4K 60p normal LGOP recording for approximately 120 minutes 4K 120p and FHD 240p high-speed recording options
- LCD screen: 3.2" Fully Articulated touch screen Clear View LCD II with 2.1 million dots
- Battery: LP-E19; USB-PD rechargeable
- Dimensions: 157.6×149.5×87.3 mm (6.20×5.89×3.44 in)
- Weight: 920 g (32 oz) (1115g with card and battery)
- Latest firmware: 1.1.2 / 24 July 2025; 11 months ago
- Made in: Japan

Chronology
- Predecessor: Canon EOS-1D X Mark III (DSLR); Canon EOS R3

The Canon EOS R1 is a full-frame mirrorless interchangeable-lens camera produced by Canon. The R1 is Canon's first flagship EOS R System model. Canon announced its development on May 15, 2024, released its full specifications on July 17, 2024, and began delivering cameras that same month.

== Features ==
- 24.2 megapixel full-frame backside-illuminated stacked sensor
- DIGIC X processor with new DIGIC Accelerator chip
- 100% autofocus coverage
- 4,368 user-selectable autofocus points for still images
- Up to 40 fps max shooting speed
- 6K RAW video up to 60p
- In-Camera Upscaling: DIGIC Accelerator processing now enables in-camera upscaling using deep learning to double the number of pixels horizontally and vertically from 24MP to 96MP image in about 10 seconds.
- improved subject recognition and tracking accuracy
- improved noise reduction
- Pre-Continuous Shooting

== Photo gallery ==
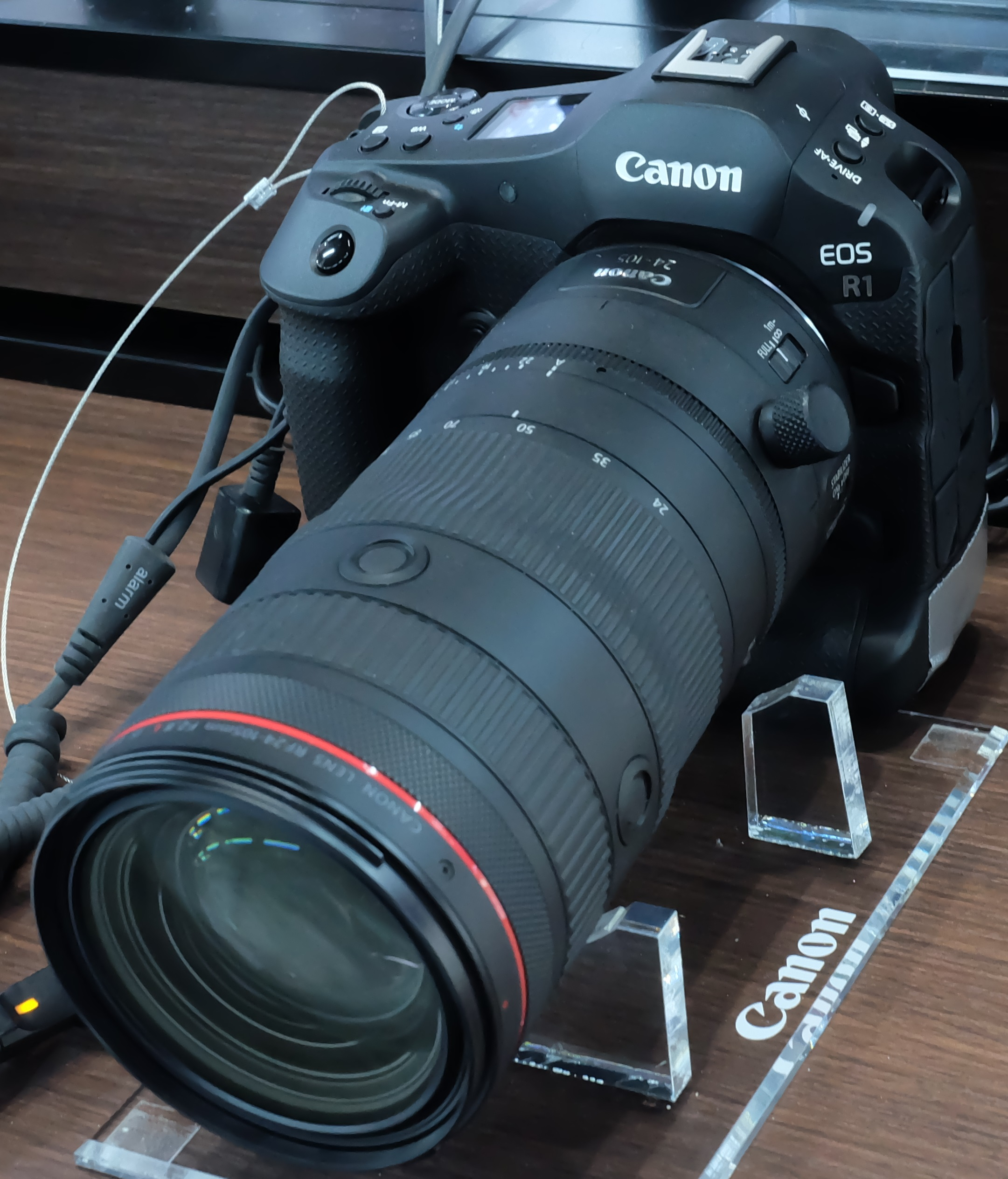

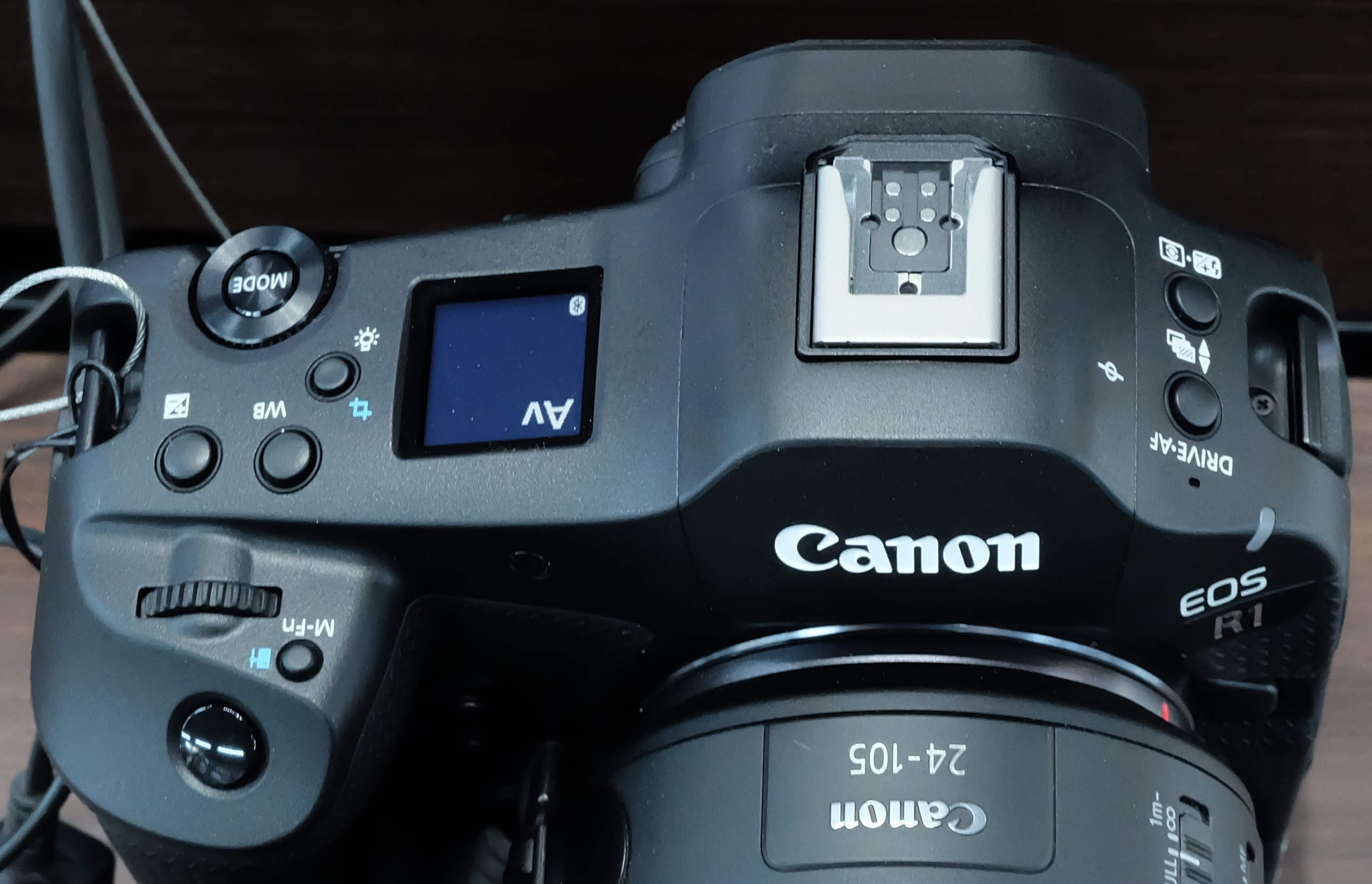

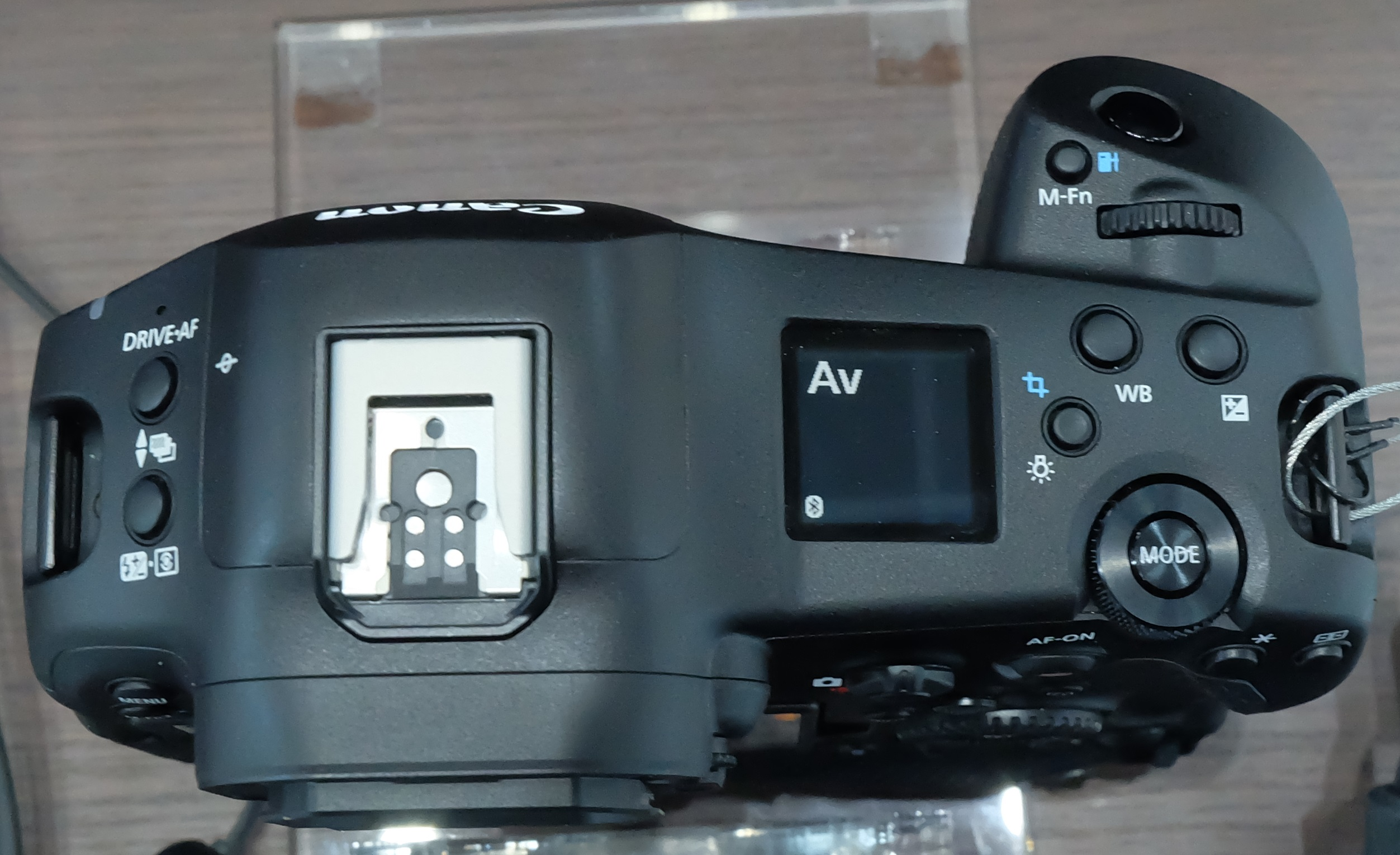

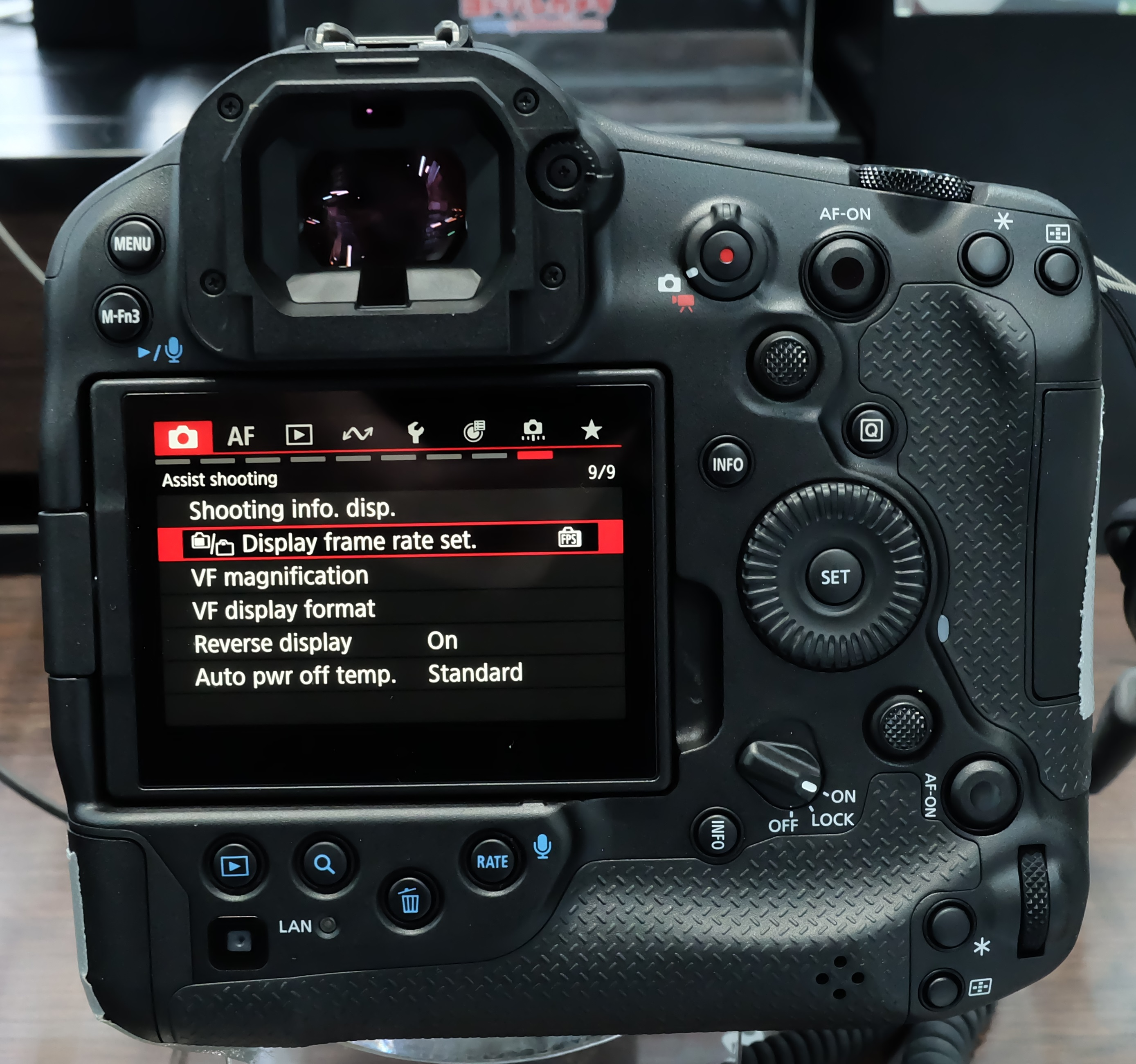

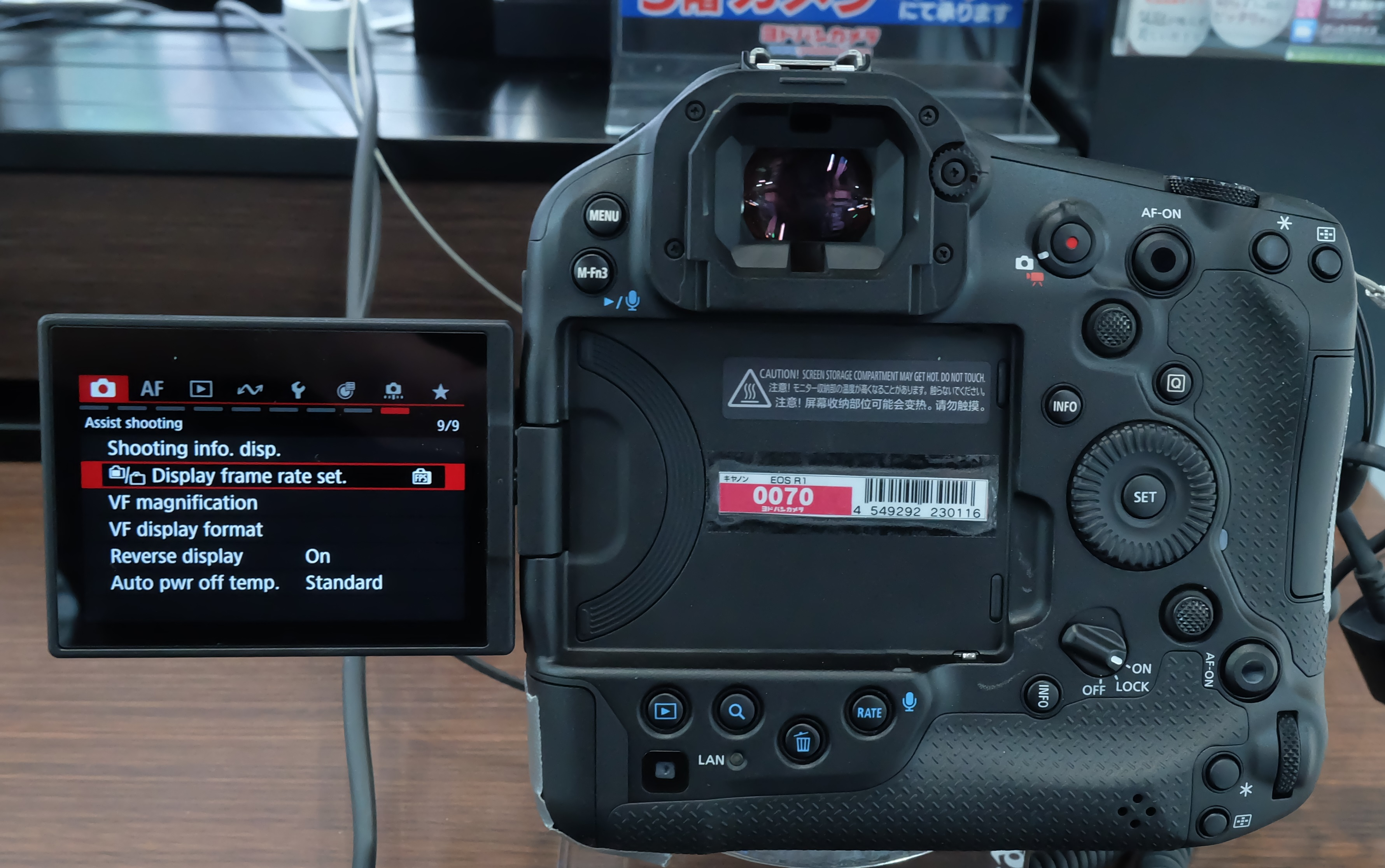

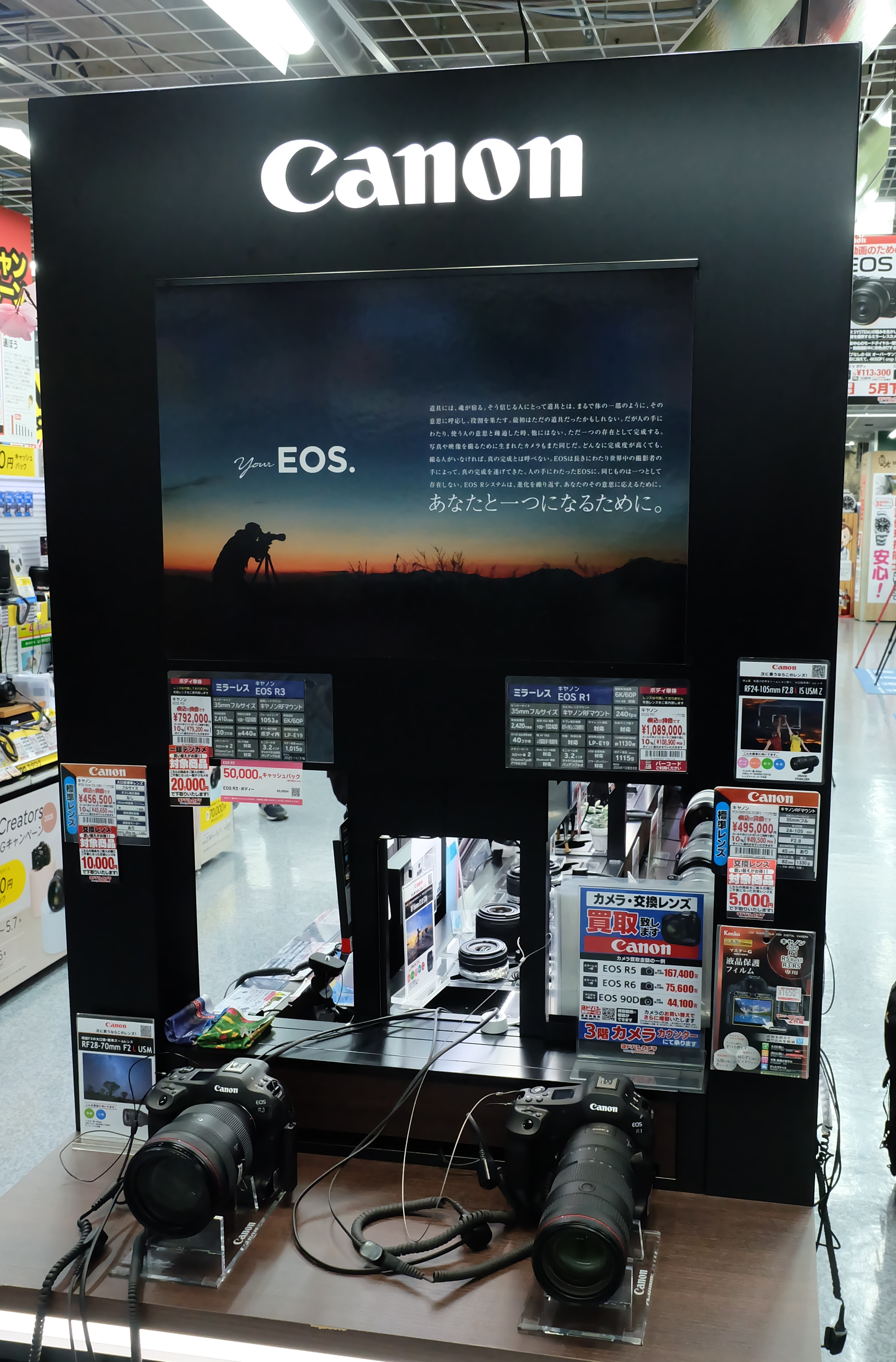

== See also ==
other Canon professional mirrorless cameras from the same period:

- Canon EOS R3
- Canon EOS R5 Mark II

Sensor	Class	12	13	14	15	16	17	18	19	20	21	22	23	24	25	26
Full-frame	Flagship														_{m} R1 ^{ATS}	
Full-frame	Professional											_{m} R3 ^{ATS}				
Full-frame	Professional										R5 ^{ATSR}				_{m} R5 Mk II ^{ATSR}	
Full-frame	Professional											_{m} R5 C ^{ATCR}				
Full-frame	Advanced										R6 ^{ATS}		_{m} R6 Mk II ^{ATS}			_{m} R6 Mk III ^{ATS}
Full-frame	Advanced															R6 V ^{ATS}
Full-frame	Advanced									Ra ^{AT}						
Full-frame	Advanced								R ^{AT}							
Full-frame	Midrange													_{m} R8 ^{AT}		
Full-frame	Entry/mid								RP ^{AT}							
APS-C	Advanced												_{m} R7 ^{ATS}			
APS-C	Midrange						M5 ^{FT}						_{m} R10 ^{AT}			
APS-C	Entry/mid		_{x} M ^{T}	M2 ^{T}	M3 ^{FT}			M6 ^{FT}		M6 Mk II ^{FT}						
APS-C	Entry/mid								M50 ^{AT}		M50 Mk II ^{AT}			_{m} R50 ^{AT}		
APS-C	Entry/mid															_{m} R50 V ^{AT}
APS-C	Entry					M10 ^{FT}		M100 ^{FT}		M200 ^{FT}				R100		
Sensor	Class															
Sensor	Class	12	13	14	15	16	17	18	19	20	21	22	23	24	25	26
