= Kodak DCS =

Digital camera and camera back series

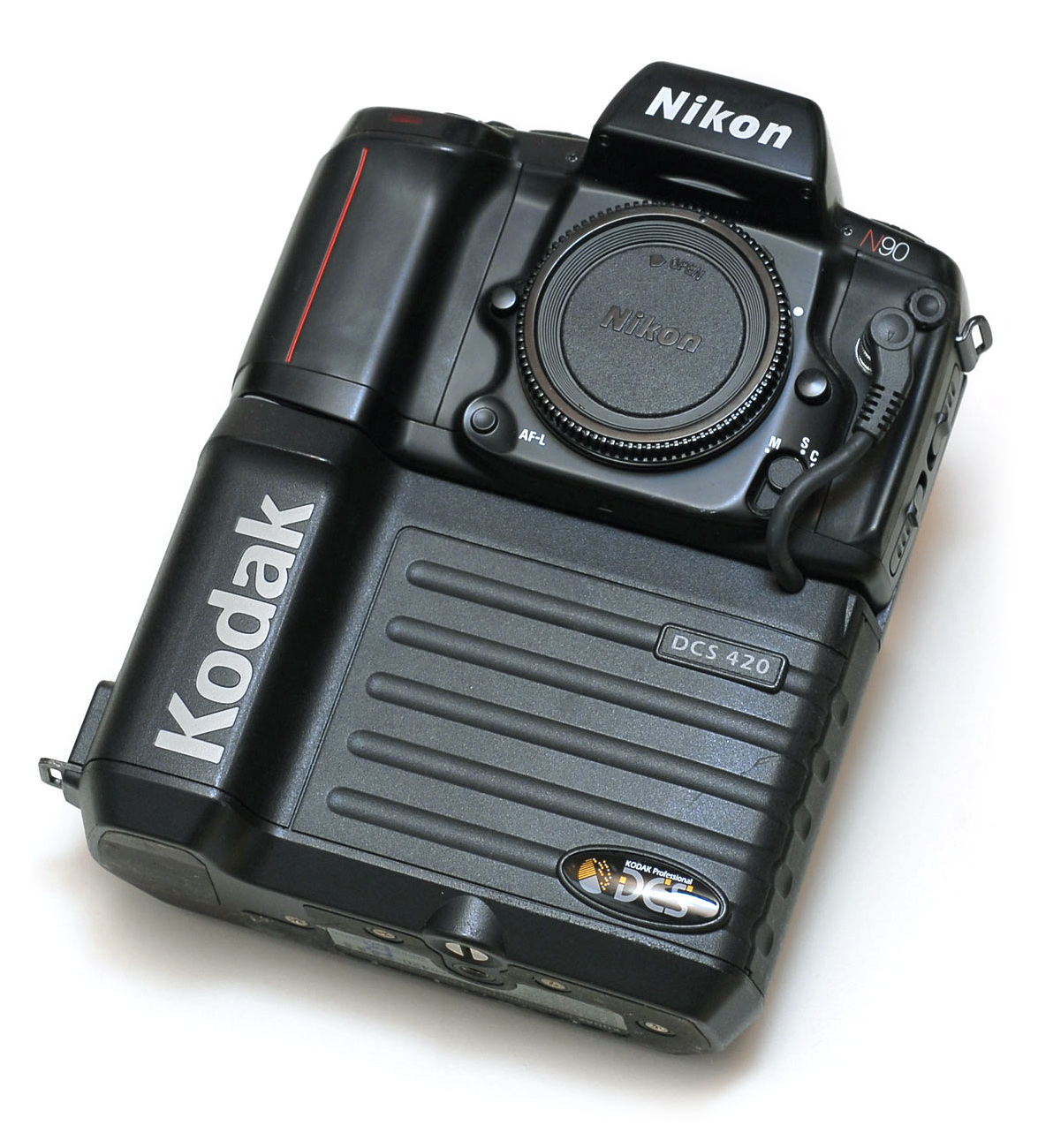
A Kodak DCS 420, a 1.5-megapixel digital SLR based on a Nikon F90 body.

The Kodak Digital Camera System is a series of digital single-lens reflex cameras and digital camera backs that were released by Kodak in the 1990s and 2000s, and discontinued in 2005. They are all based on existing 35mm film SLRs from Nikon, Canon and Sigma. The range includes the original Kodak DCS, the first commercially available digital SLR.

== History ==
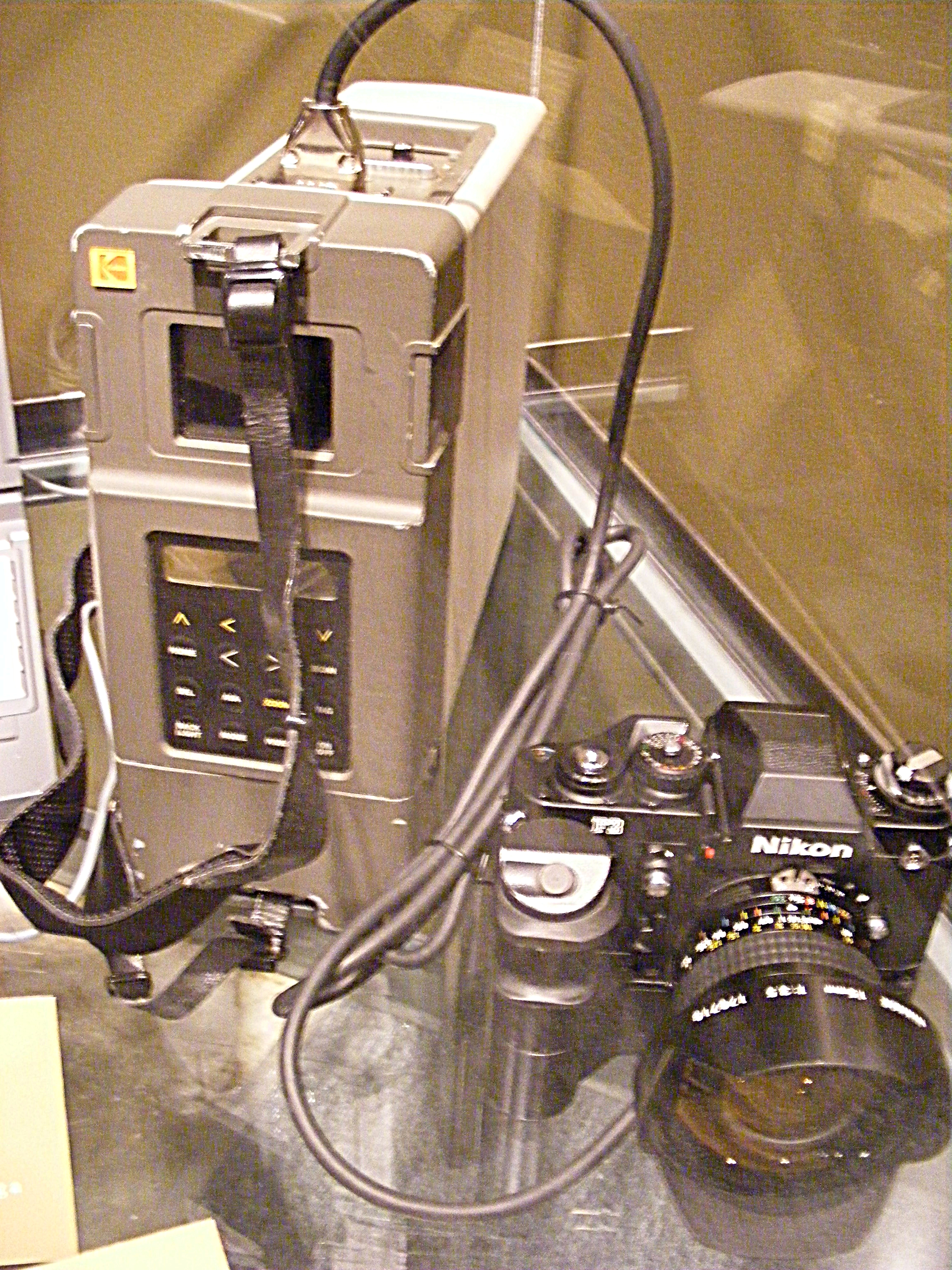
Kodak DCS 100, based on a Nikon F3 body with Digital Storage Unit, released in May, 1991.

In 1974, Peter L. P. Dillon at Kodak Research Labs invented color image sensors, initially using a Fairchild 100 x 100 pixel CCD sensor. In 1975, Steven Sasson developed Kodak's first prototype digital still camera, which used the same Fairchild 100 x 100 pixel CCD. By 1986 Kodak had developed a sensor with 1.4 million pixels. It was used in what is believed to be the world's first Digital Single-Lens Reflex (D-SLR) camera, known as the Electro-Optic Camera, which was designed and constructed by Eastman Kodak Company under a U.S. Government contract in 1987 and 1988.

A number of other improvements were made to increase image quality and usability, including improvements in sensor technology, the first raw image format known as DCR (Digital Camera Raw), and host software to process the DCR images. The original Kodak DCS was launched in 1991, and is based on a stock Nikon F3 SLR film camera with a CCD image sensor mounted in the film gate. It uses a 1.3-megapixel Kodak KAF-1300 sensor, and a separate shoulder-mounted processing and storage unit.

The DCS 200 series, introduced in 1992, condenses the storage unit into a module which is mounted onto the base and back of a stock Nikon 8008 SLR film camera. It was the first digital camera to use the Bayer color filter pattern. The module contains a built-in 80 megabyte hard drive and is powered with AA batteries. It was followed by the upgraded DCS 400 series of 1994, which replaces the hard drive with a PCMCIA card slot. The DCS 400 series includes the 1.5-megapixel DCS 420, and the 6-megapixel Kodak DCS 460, which retailed for $28,000 on launch. In common with Kodak's later 6-megapixel models, the DCS 460 used the award-winning APS-H Kodak M6 sensor. A modified version of the DCS 420 was also sold by the Associated Press as the Associated Press NC2000. In parallel with the DCS 400 series Kodak also sold the analogous Kodak EOS DCS range, which was based on the Canon EOS-1N SLR. With the exception of the original DCS 100, these early models do not include LCD preview screens.

Kodak's subsequent models integrate the digital module with the camera body more thoroughly, and include LCD preview screens and removable batteries. The DCS 500 series of 1998 is also based on the Canon EOS-1N, and comprises the 2-megapixel DCS 520 and the 6-megapixel DCS 560, which initially had a suggested retail price of $28,500. These models were also sold by Canon, as the Canon D2000 and D6000 respectively, and were the first digital SLRs sold under the Canon name. Kodak used the same electronics package for the DCS 600 series, which is based on the Nikon F5. The DCS 600 range includes the Kodak DCS 620x, a high-sensitivity model with an upgraded indium tin oxide sensor and a cyan-magenta-yellow Bayer filter, which has a then-unique top ISO setting of ISO 6400.

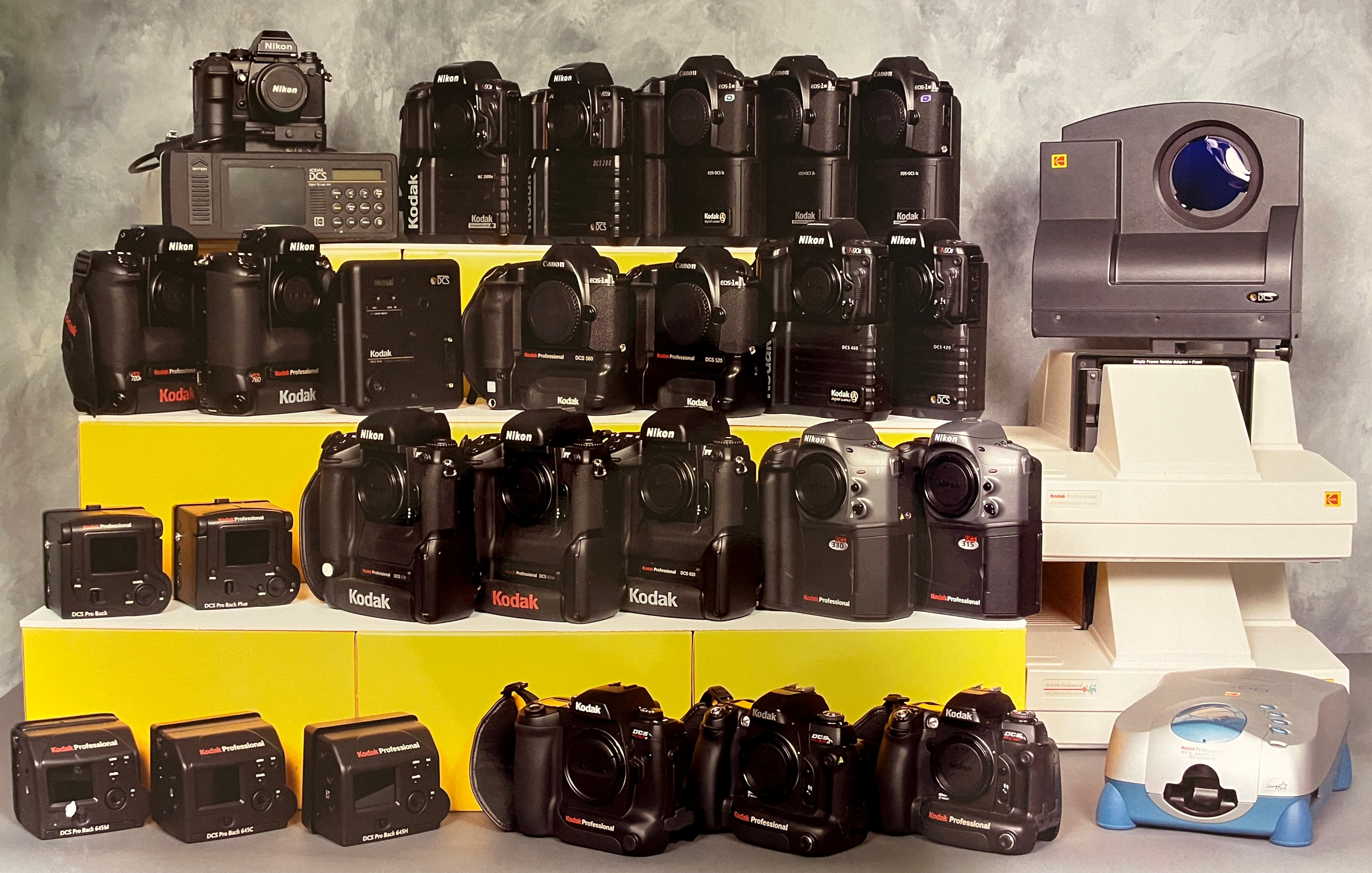
Kodak Professional DCS D-SLR cameras, Medium format camera backs, and film scanners

Kodak concluded the initial DCS range with the DCS 700 series, which comprises the 2-megapixel DCS 720x, the 6-megapixel DCS 760, and the 6-megapixel DCS 760m, which has a monochrome sensor. By the time of launch, Kodak faced competition from the popular Nikon D1 and Nikon D1x, which were physically smaller and cheaper. The DCS 760's initial list price was $8,000.

Kodak final generation of DCS cameras was launched with the Kodak DCS Pro 14n, a 14-megapixel full-frame digital SLR, in 2002, and continued with the upgraded DCS PRO SLR/n in 2004. These two cameras are based on a Nikon F80 body, and are considerably more compact than previous Kodaks. They use sensors designed by Belgian imaging company FillFactory. The DCS PRO SLR/n was also accompanied by the Canon-compatible DCS PRO SLR/c, which is based on a Sigma SA9 SLR. Kodak discontinued the SLR/n and SLR/c in May 2005, to concentrate on compact digital cameras and high-end medium format digital backs for Leaf, among others.

Kodak continued to design and manufacture CCD image sensors, including the full-frame 18-megapixel KAF-18500, which is used in the Leica M9 digital rangefinder, until its image sensor division was sold to Platinum Equity in 2012. This image sensor company operated under the name Truesense and was later acquired by ON Semiconductor in 2014. On Semiconductor began closing the former Kodak CCD manufacturing facility in 2019.

== Models ==
Kodak DCS cameras and backs
| Gen. | Family | Year | Model(s) (Note: Where lower-case letters are used as a suffix to the camera model in Generations 1 through 3, the following conventions are used: c: Color filter array (Bayer filter); x: Color filter array (CYYM); m: Monochrome camera (luminance only); ir: Infrared-sensitive; cir: False-color infrared; i: Internal storage included (e.g., mi and ci)) | Host camera | Image sensor | | | | | Processor |
| Gen. | Family | Year | Model(s) | Host camera | Name | Res. | Size | Pixel size (μm) | Crop factor | Processor |
|---|---|---|---|---|---|---|---|---|---|---|
| 0 | DCS | 1991 | DCS 100 (DC3/DM3) | Nikon F3 | KAF-1300 (M3) | 1280×1024 | 20.5×16.4 mm (0.81×0.65 in) | 16 | 1.65 | Intel 80C188 |
| 1 | DCS 200 | 1992 | DCS 200c / 200m / 200ci / 200mi | Nikon F-801s (N8008s) | KAF-1600 (M5) | 1524×1012 | 13.7×9.1 mm (0.54×0.36 in) | 9 | 2.63 | Intel 80C196 |
| 1 | DCS 200+ | 1994 | AP NC2000 / NC2000e / NC2000m / NC2000ir | Nikon F90x (N90s) | KAF-1300 (M3) | 1280×1024 | 20.5×16.4 mm (0.81×0.65 in) | 16 | 1.65 | Intel 80C196 |
| 1 | DCS 200+ | 1994 | DCS 410c / 420c / 420ir / 420m / 420c P/S | Nikon F90x (N90s) | KAF-1600 (M5) | 1524×1012 | 13.7×9.1 mm (0.54×0.36 in) | 9 | 2.63 | Intel 80C196 |
| 1 | DCS 200+ | 1994 | DCS 460c / 460m / 460c P/S / 460ir | Nikon F90x (N90s) | KAF-6300 (M6) | 3060×2036 | 27.5×18.3 mm (1.08×0.72 in) | 9 | 1.31 | Intel 80C196 |
| 1 | DCS 200+ | 1995 | EOS-DCS 1c / 1m / 1ir | Canon EOS-1n | KAF-6300 (M6) | 3060×2036 | 27.5×18.3 mm (1.08×0.72 in) | 9 | 1.31 | Intel 80C196 |
| 1 | DCS 200+ | 1995 | EOS-DCS 3c / 3m / 3ir | Canon EOS-1n | KAF-1300 (M3) | 1280×1024 | 20.5×16.4 mm (0.81×0.65 in) | 16 | 1.65 | Intel 80C196 |
| 1 | DCS 200+ | 1995 | EOS-DCS 5c / 5m / 5ir | Canon EOS-1n | KAF-1600 (M5) | 1524×1012 | 13.7×9.1 mm (0.54×0.36 in) | 9 | 2.63 | Intel 80C196 |
| 1 | DCS 200+ | 1995 | DCS 465c / 465m / 465ir | Hasselblad V (mount) | KAF-6300 (M6) | 3060×2036 | 27.5×18.3 mm (1.08×0.72 in) | 9 | 2.42 (Note: Crop factor computed for 6×6 frame size) | Intel 80C196 |
| 2 | Pro SLR | 1998 | DCS 520c / EOS D2000c | Canon EOS-1n | KAF-2001CE (M15) | 1728×1152 | 22.5×15 mm (0.89×0.59 in) | 13 | 1.6 | Motorola MPC821 |
| 2 | Pro SLR | 1998 | DCS 520x | Canon EOS-1n | (M23) | 1728×1152 | 22.5×15 mm (0.89×0.59 in) | 13 | 1.6 | Motorola MPC821 |
| 2 | Pro SLR | 1998 | DCS 560c / 560m / EOS D6000c | Canon EOS-1n | KAF-6302CE (M16) | 3040×2008 | 27.4×18.1 mm (1.08×0.71 in) | 9 | 1.32 | Motorola MPC821 |
| 2 | Pro SLR | 1998 | DCS 315c | Nikon Pronea 600i (6i) | KAF-1600 (M5) | 1524×1012 | 13.7×9.1 mm (0.54×0.36 in) | 9 | 2.63 | Motorola MPC821 |
| 2 | Pro SLR | 1999 | DCS 330c | Nikon Pronea 600i (6i) | KAF-3000CE (M17) | 2008×1504 | 18.1×13.5 mm (0.71×0.53 in) | 9 | 1.92 | Motorola MPC821 |
| 2 | Pro SLR | 1999 | DCS 620c | Nikon F5 | KAF-2001CE (M15) | 1728×1152 | 22.5×15 mm (0.89×0.59 in) | 13 | 1.6 | Motorola MPC821 |
| 2 | Pro SLR | 1999 | DCS 620x | Nikon F5 | (M23) | 1728×1152 | 22.5×15 mm (0.89×0.59 in) | 13 | 1.6 | Motorola MPC821 |
| 2 | Pro SLR | 1999 | DCS 660c / 660m / 660cir | Nikon F5 | KAF-6302CE (M16) | 3040×2008 | 27.4×18.1 mm (1.08×0.71 in) | 9 | 1.32 | Motorola MPC821 |
| 3 | Pro 3 | 2000 | DCS Pro Back / Pro Back m / Pro Back Plus | Hasselblad V (mount) | KAF-16801CE (M11) | 4080×4080 | 36.7×36.7 mm (1.44×1.44 in) | 9 | 1.54 | Motorola MPC823 + TI TMS320C6211 |
| 3 | Pro 3 | 2001 | DCS 720x | Nikon F5 | (M23) | 1728×1152 | 22.5×15 mm (0.89×0.59 in) | 13 | 1.6 | Motorola MPC823 + TI TMS320C6211 |
| 3 | Pro 3 | 2001 | DCS 760c / 760m / 760ir | Nikon F5 | KAF-6302CE (M16) | 3040×2008 | 27.4×18.1 mm (1.08×0.71 in) | 9 | 1.6 | Motorola MPC823 + TI TMS320C6211 |
| 3 | Pro 3 | 2002 | DCS Pro Back 645 C / H / M | Contax 645AF, Mamiya 645AF / AFD, Hasselblad H1 | KAF-16801CE (M11) | 4080×4080 | 36.7×36.7 mm (1.44×1.44 in) | 9 | 1.35 (Note: Crop factor computed for 6×4.5 frame size) | Motorola MPC823 + TI TMS320C6211 |
| 4 | Pro 14 | 2002 | DCS Pro 14n / Pro 14n m | Nikon F80 | (C14) | 4500×3000 | 36×24 mm (1.42×0.94 in) | 8 | 1 | Motorola MPC823 + TI TMS320C6414 |
| 4 | Pro 14 | 2002 | DCS Pro 14nx | Nikon F80 | (X14) | 4500×3000 | 36×24 mm (1.42×0.94 in) | 8 | 1 | Motorola MPC823 + TI TMS320C6414 |
| 4 | Pro 14 | 2004 | DCS Pro SLR/n | Nikon F80 | (X14) | 4500×3000 | 36×24 mm (1.42×0.94 in) | 8 | 1 | Motorola MPC823 + TI TMS320C6414 |
| 4 | Pro 14 | 2004 | DCS Pro SLR/c | Sigma SA-9 with EF mount | (X14) | 4500×3000 | 36×24 mm (1.42×0.94 in) | 8 | 1 | Motorola MPC823 + TI TMS320C6414 |

=== 35mm Nikon-based ===
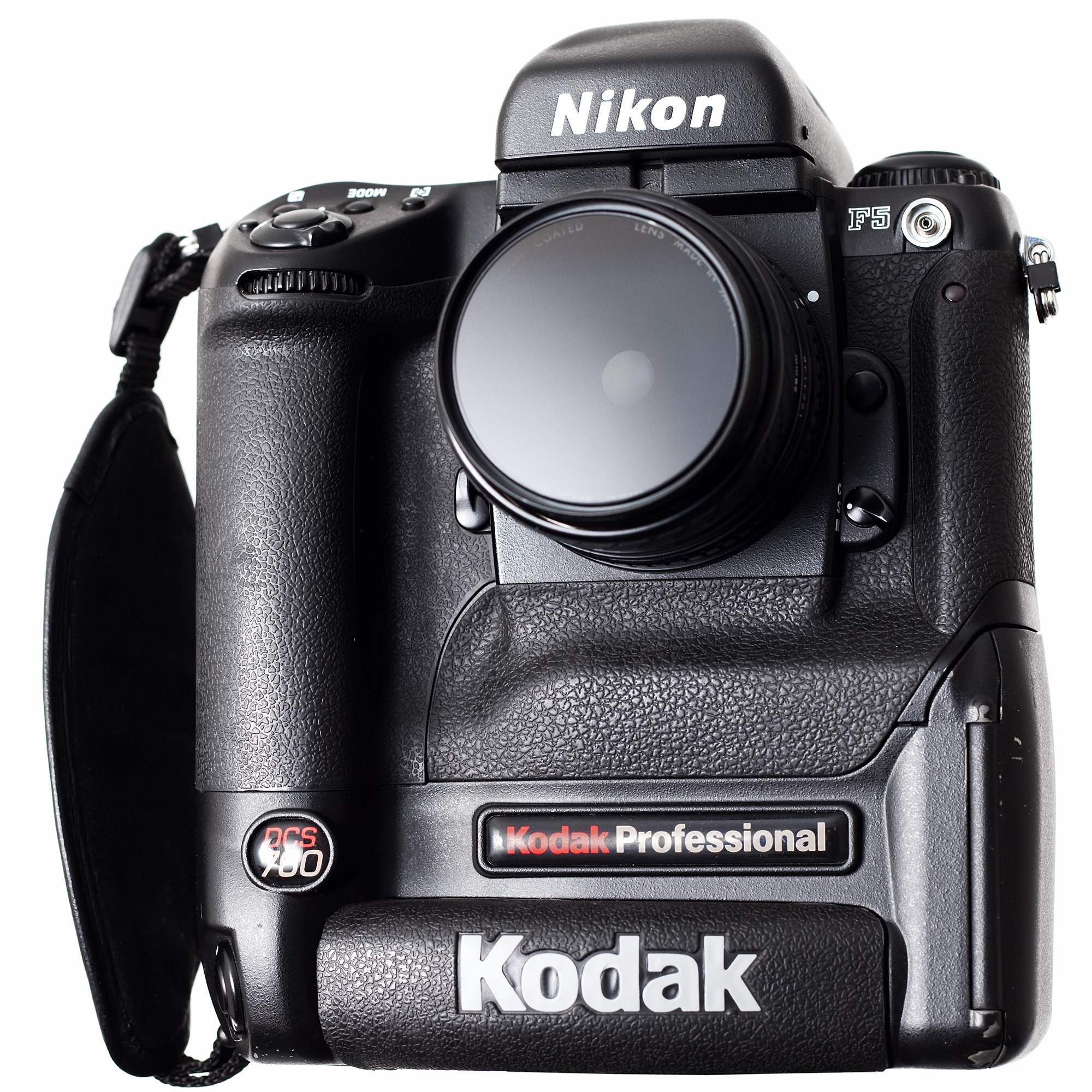
A Kodak DCS 760, a six megapixel digital SLR based on a Nikon F5

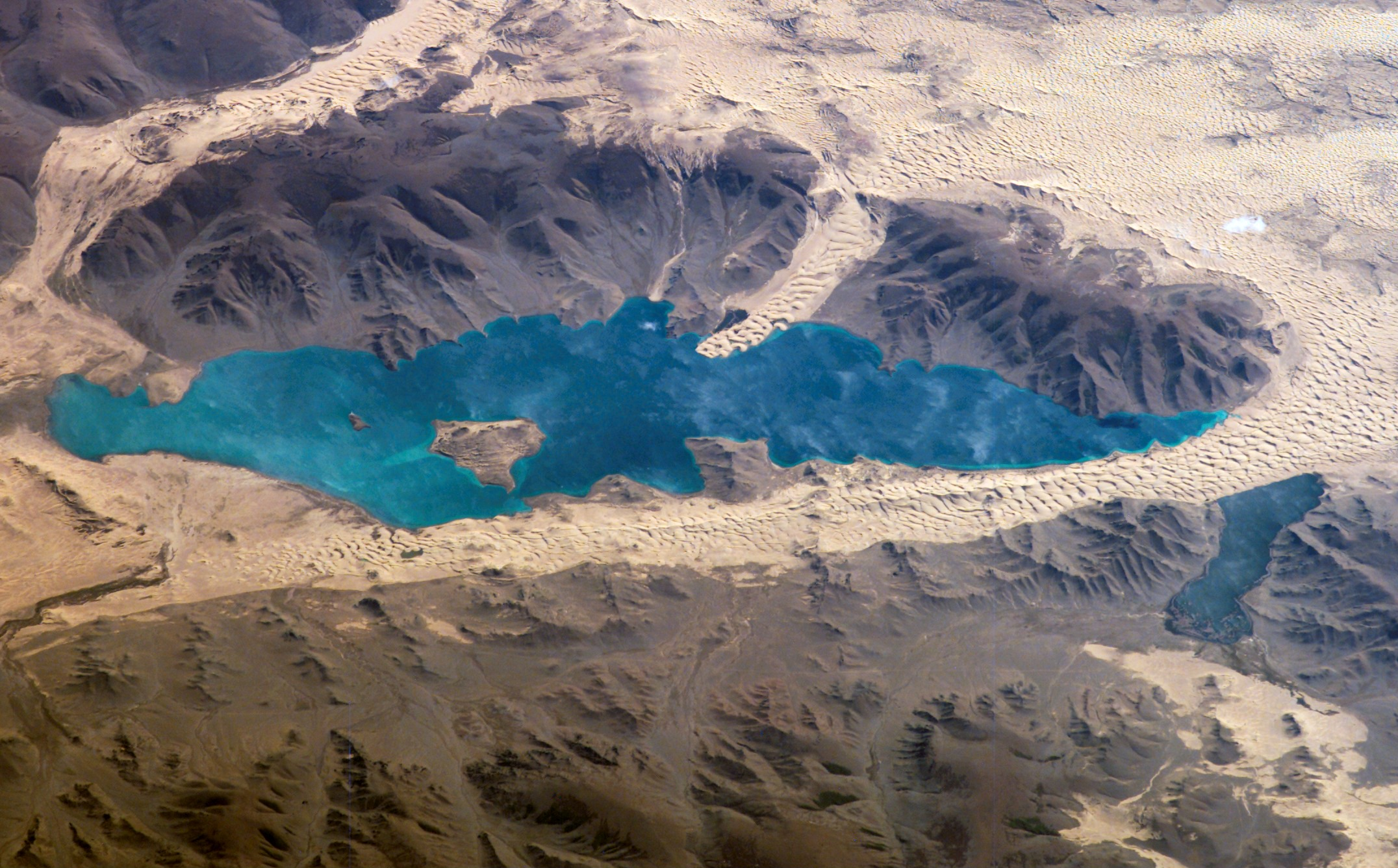
View taken with a Kodak 760C from orbit.

All models based on Nikon bodies and use Nikon's F mount lenses.

- Kodak DCS - May 1991, later called DCS 100, first commercially available DSLR camera, Nikon F3 based body. Many variants.
- Kodak DCS 200 - 1993, Nikon F-801s (N8008s) based body. Color, monochrome and infrared variants.
- Kodak NC2000 series - August 1994, Nikon F90/N90 and N90s based body, designed in speed and noise characteristics for press use.
- Kodak DCS 400 series - August 1994, Nikon F90/N90 and Nikon F90x/N90s based body
- Kodak DCS 600 series - 1999, Nikon F5 based body
- Kodak DCS 700 series - 2001, Nikon F5 based body
- Kodak DCS Pro 14n - 2002, Nikon F80 based body, full-frame.
- Kodak DCS Pro 14nx - 2004, variant; incorporates updated sensor, memory buffer and firmware from DCS Pro SLR/n.
- Kodak DCS Pro SLR/n - 2004, Nikon F80 based body, full-frame.

=== APS Nikon-based ===
- Kodak DCS 300 series - 1998 and 1999, budget priced professional Nikon APS format SLR Pronea 600i and 6i based body, uses Nikon F-mount and IX-Nikkor (APS) lenses.

=== 35mm Canon-based ===
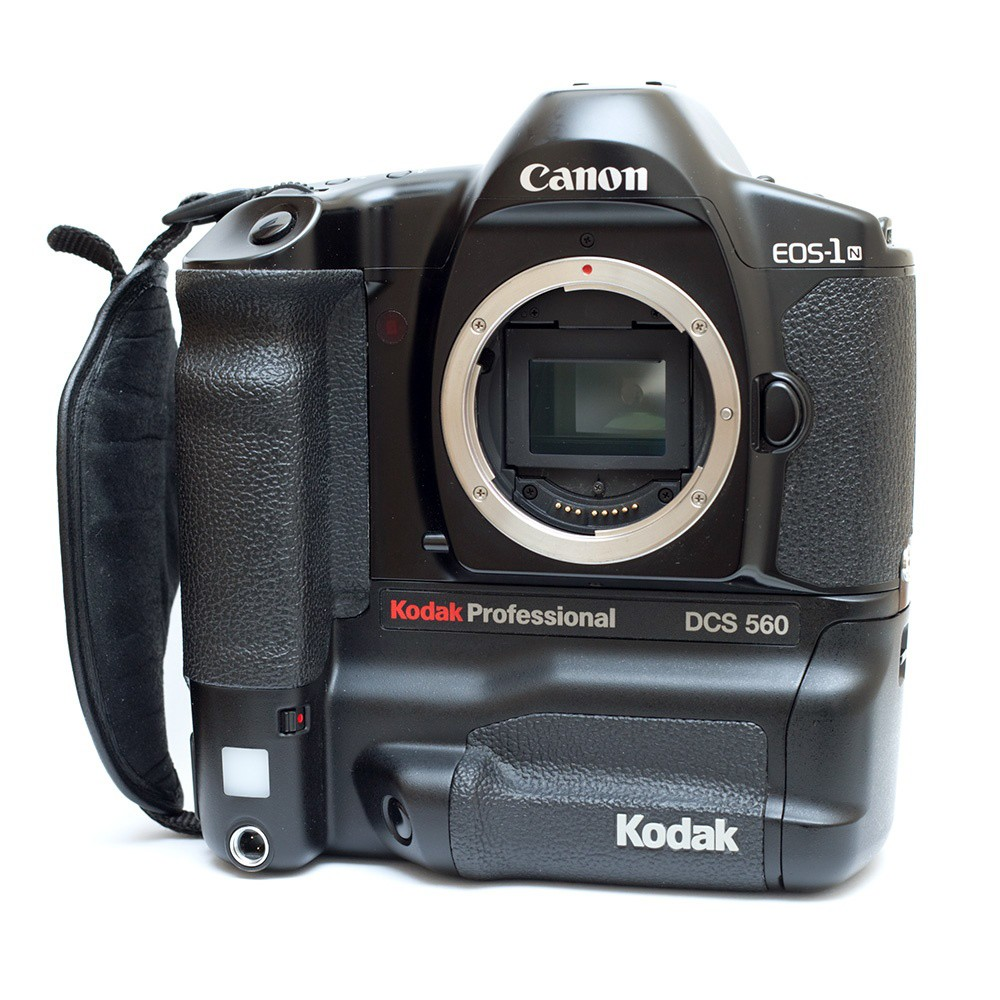
A Kodak DCS 560, a six megapixel digital SLR based on a Canon EOS-1N

All models use Canon's EF lens mount.

- Kodak EOS DCS series - 1995, Canon EOS-1n based body. Rebranded by Canon as EOS DCS 1, -3 and -5.
- Kodak DCS 500 series - 1998, Canon EOS-1n based body. Rebranded by Canon as Canon EOS D2000 and Canon EOS D6000
- Kodak DCS Pro SLR/c - 2004, Sigma SA9, with Canon EF compatible mount and electronics.

=== Medium format camera backs ===
- Kodak DCS 465 - 1995, 6-megapixel digital camera back for several medium format cameras like Hasselblad 500 / 503, Mamiya RB / RZ and Sinar cameras
- Kodak DCS Pro Back / Plus / 645 - 2000, 16-megapixel digital camera back for several medium format cameras.
