= Canon EOS D2000 =

1998 APS-C digital single-lens reflex camera

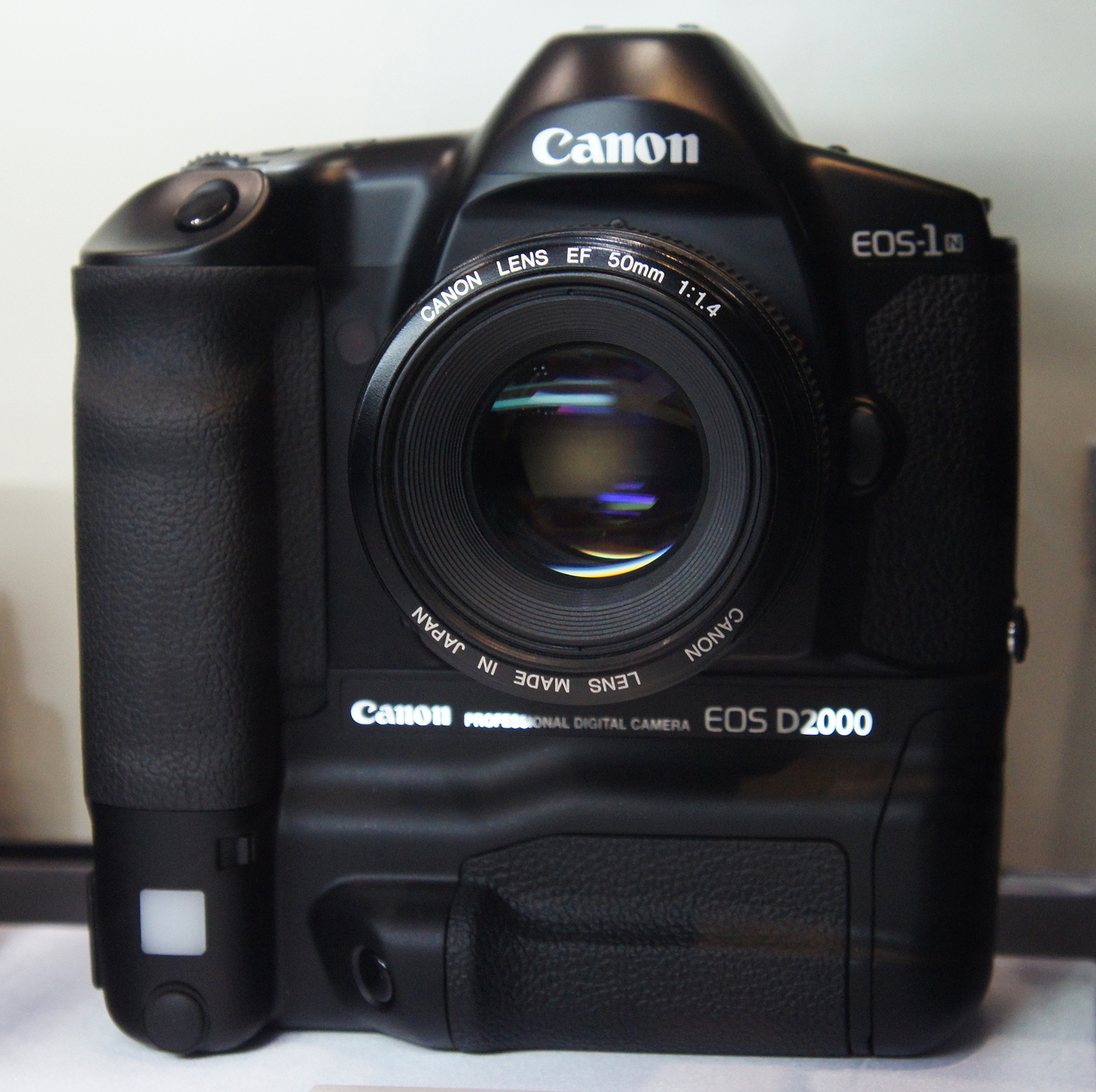

Overview
- Maker: Canon Inc.
- Type: Single-lens reflex with digital back

Lens
- Lens mount: Canon EF
- Lens: Interchangeable

Sensor/medium
- Sensor: CCD, 1.6x crop factor (APS-C)
- Maximum resolution: 1,728 x 1,152 (2.0 megapixels)
- Film speed: 200-1600 in 1 EV steps
- Storage media: 340MB PCMCIA cards

Focusing
- Focus modes: One-shot, AI-Servo, AI-Focus, Manual
- Focus areas: 5 points
- Focus bracketing: none

Exposure/metering
- Exposure modes: Full auto, programmed, shutter-priority, aperture priority, manual
- Exposure metering: TTL, full aperture, zones
- Metering modes: Evaluative, Center Weighted, Average

Flash
- Flash: Canon hotshoe
- Flash bracketing: none

Shutter
- Shutter: electronic focal plane
- Shutter speed range: 30 to 1/8000 s
- Continuous shooting: up to 3.6 frame/s, max 12 frames

Viewfinder
- Viewfinder: Optical

Image processing
- White balance: 5 presets, including Auto and custom
- WB bracketing: none

General
- LCD screen: none
- Battery: Removable, rechargeable NiCD battery
- Optional battery packs: none
- Weight: 1,650 g (58 oz) (body only)

The Canon EOS D2000 (a Canon branded Kodak DCS 520) is a 2-megapixel digital single-lens reflex camera developed by Kodak on a Canon EOS-1N body. It was released in March 1998. It features a CCD sensor and can shoot at 3.5 frames per second. Many enthusiasts regard the D2000 as Canon's first truly usable Digital SLR. It was released in tandem with the Canon EOS D6000 (a rebranded Kodak DCS 560), a 6-megapixel model.

Like its predecessor, the EOS DCS 3, the D2000 uses an EOS-1 N camera body with a Kodak digital back. However, the digital back was completely redesigned, being better integrated into the body, using a higher-resolution APS-C sized sensor, adding a second PCMCIA card slot, replacing the SCSI interface with an IEEE 1394 interface, and adding a color screen for viewing images that had been taken, a feature that was lacking from the DCS 3 and the higher-end DCS 1. Other incremental improvements such as a higher shooting rate and a swappable, rechargeable battery pack were included.

The D2000 was the last of the Kodak / Canon press cameras. It was sold by Kodak until at least as late as 2001. Canon's first home-grown professional digital SLR, the Canon EOS-1D, was released later the same year.

== See also ==
- Canon EOS
- Canon EF lens mount
- Kodak DCS

Type	Sensor	Class	00	01	02	03	04	05	06	07	08	09	10	11	12	13	14	15	16	17	18	19	20	21	22	23	24	25
DSLR	Full-frame	Flagship				1Ds		1Ds Mk II			1Ds Mk III					1D C												
DSLR	Full-frame	Flagship				1Ds		1Ds Mk II			1Ds Mk III				1D X					1D X Mk II ^{T}			1D X Mk III ^{T}					
DSLR	APS-H	Flagship			1D			1D Mk II	1D Mk II N		1D Mk III		1D Mk IV															
DSLR	Full-frame	Professional																	5DS / 5DS R									
DSLR	Full-frame	Professional							5D			_{x} 5D Mk II			_{x} 5D Mk III					5D Mk IV ^{T}								
DSLR	Full-frame	Advanced														_{x} 6D					_{x} 6D Mk II ^{AT}							
DSLR	APS-C	Advanced											_{x} 7D					_{x} 7D Mk II										
DSLR	APS-C	Mid-range						20Da								_{x} 60Da ^{A}												
DSLR	APS-C	Mid-range		D30	D60	10D		20D	30D		40D	_{x} 50D		_{x} 60D ^{A}		_{x} 70D ^{AT}		80D ^{AT}					90D ^{AT}					
DSLR	APS-C	Mid-range																	760D ^{AT}		77D ^{AT}							
DSLR	APS-C	Entry-level					300D	350D		400D	450D	_{x} 500D	_{x} 550D	_{x} 600D ^{A}		_{x} 650D ^{AT}	_{x} 700D ^{AT}		_{x} 750D ^{AT}		800D ^{AT}			850D ^{AT}				
DSLR	APS-C	Entry-level															_{x} 100D ^{T}		_{x} 200D ^{AT}				250D ^{AT}					
DSLR	APS-C	Entry-level										1000D		_{x} 1100D			_{x} 1200D			1300D		2000D						
DSLR	APS-C	Value																				4000D						
Early models			Canon EOS DCS 5 (1995); Canon EOS DCS 3 (1995); Canon EOS DCS 1 (1995); Canon EOS D2000 (1998); Canon EOS D6000 (1998)																									
Type	Sensor	Spec																										
Type	Sensor	Spec	00	01	02	03	04	05	06	07	08	09	10	11	12	13	14	15	16	17	18	19	20	21	22	23	24	25
