= Canon EOS DCS 1 =

1995 APS-H digital single-lens reflex camera

Overview
- Maker: Canon Inc.
- Type: Single-lens reflex with Digital back

Lens
- Lens: Interchangeable (EF)

Sensor/medium
- Sensor: CCD, 1.3x crop factor (APS-H)
- Maximum resolution: 3,060 x 2,036 (6.2 megapixels)
- Film speed: 80
- Storage media: PCMCIA card slot

Focusing
- Focus modes: One-shot, AI-Servo, AI-Focus, Manual
- Focus areas: 5 points
- Focus bracketing: none

Exposure/metering
- Exposure modes: Full auto, programmed, shutter-priority, aperture priority, manual
- Exposure metering: TTL, full aperture, zones
- Metering modes: Evaluative, Center Weighted, Average

Flash
- Flash: Canon hotshoe
- Flash bracketing: none

Shutter
- Shutter: electronic focal plane
- Shutter speed range: 30 to 1/8000 s
- Continuous shooting: 2 frames in 1.2 seconds, then 1 frame every 8 seconds

Viewfinder
- Viewfinder: Optical

Image processing
- White balance: 7 presets, including Auto and custom
- WB bracketing: none

General
- LCD screen: none
- Battery: Built-in, rechargeable
- Optional battery packs: none.
- Weight: 1,800 g (63 oz) (body only)

The Canon EOS DCS 1 was Kodak's third Canon-based Digital SLR camera (a rebranded Kodak EOS DCS-1). It was released in December 1995, following the cheaper EOS DCS 3, which was released earlier that year. Like that camera, it combined an EOS-1N body with a modified Kodak DCS 460 digital back. Despite offering a then-enormous resolution of 6 megapixels with a relatively large APS-H sensor, a number of technical issues (together with its 3.6 million yen price) meant that it was never a very popular camera other than for a few people with specialized roles.

Although the sensor was much larger than the EOS DCS 3, the DCS 1 had a lower fixed sensitivity of ISO 80. The large image size resulted in a burst rate of just over one image per second for two images, followed by an eight-second delay to clear the buffer. A typical contemporary 340MB PCMCIA card or IBM Microdrive could store 53 images. In line with the rest of the Kodak DCS range, the EOS DCS 1 could not produce JPEG files in camera.

The EOS DCS 1 was succeeded in 1998 by the EOS D6000 (a rebranded Kodak DCS 560).

== See also ==
- Kodak DCS

| Type | Sensor | Class | 00 | 01 | 02 | 03 | 04 | 05 | 06 | 07 | 08 | 09 | 10 | 11 | 12 | 13 | 14 | 15 | 16 | 17 | 18 | 19 | 20 | 21 | 22 | 23 | 24 | 25 |
|---|---|---|---|---|---|---|---|---|---|---|---|---|---|---|---|---|---|---|---|---|---|---|---|---|---|---|---|---|
| DSLR | Full-frame | Flagship | | | | 1Ds | | 1Ds Mk II | | | 1Ds Mk III | | | | | 1D C | | | | | | | | | | | | |
| DSLR | Full-frame | Flagship | | | | 1Ds | | 1Ds Mk II | | | 1Ds Mk III | | | | 1D X | | | | | 1D X Mk II ^{T} | | | 1D X Mk III ^{T} | | | | | |
| DSLR | APS-H | Flagship | | | 1D | | | 1D Mk II | 1D Mk II N | | 1D Mk III | | 1D Mk IV | | | | | | | | | | | | | | | |
| DSLR | Full-frame | Professional | | | | | | | | | | | | | | | | | 5DS / 5DS R | | | | | | | | | |
| DSLR | Full-frame | Professional | | | | | | | 5D | | | _{x} 5D Mk II | | | _{x} 5D Mk III | | | | | 5D Mk IV ^{T} | | | | | | | | |
| DSLR | Full-frame | Advanced | | | | | | | | | | | | | | _{x} 6D | | | | | _{x} 6D Mk II ^{AT} | | | | | | | |
| DSLR | APS-C | Advanced | | | | | | | | | | | _{x} 7D | | | | | _{x} 7D Mk II | | | | | | | | | | |
| DSLR | APS-C | Mid-range | | | | | | 20Da | | | | | | | | _{x} 60Da ^{A} | | | | | | | | | | | | |
| DSLR | APS-C | Mid-range | | D30 | D60 | 10D | | 20D | 30D | | 40D | _{x} 50D | | _{x} 60D ^{A} | | _{x} 70D ^{AT} | | 80D ^{AT} | | | | | 90D ^{AT} | | | | | |
| DSLR | APS-C | Mid-range | | | | | | | | | | | | | | | | | 760D ^{AT} | | 77D ^{AT} | | | | | | | |
| DSLR | APS-C | Entry-level | | | | | 300D | 350D | | 400D | 450D | _{x} 500D | _{x} 550D | _{x} 600D ^{A} | | _{x} 650D ^{AT} | _{x} 700D ^{AT} | | _{x} 750D ^{AT} | | 800D ^{AT} | | | 850D ^{AT} | | | | |
| DSLR | APS-C | Entry-level | | | | | | | | | | | | | | | _{x} 100D ^{T} | | _{x} 200D ^{AT} | | | | 250D ^{AT} | | | | | |
| DSLR | APS-C | Entry-level | | | | | | | | | | 1000D | | _{x} 1100D | | | _{x} 1200D | | | 1300D | | 2000D | | | | | | |
| DSLR | APS-C | Value | | | | | | | | | | | | | | | | | | | | 4000D | | | | | | |
| Early models | | | Canon EOS DCS 5 (1995); Canon EOS DCS 3 (1995); Canon EOS DCS 1 (1995); Canon EOS D2000 (1998); Canon EOS D6000 (1998) | | | | | | | | | | | | | | | | | | | | | | | | | |
| Type | Sensor | Spec | | | | | | | | | | | | | | | | | | | | | | | | | | |
| Type | Sensor | Spec | 00 | 01 | 02 | 03 | 04 | 05 | 06 | 07 | 08 | 09 | 10 | 11 | 12 | 13 | 14 | 15 | 16 | 17 | 18 | 19 | 20 | 21 | 22 | 23 | 24 | 25 |
