= Kodak DCS Pro SLR/c =

Kodak Professional DCS Pro SLR/c
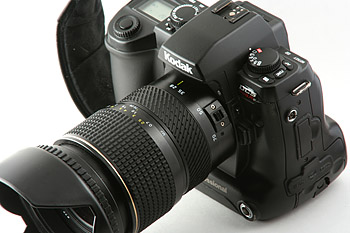

Overview
- Maker: Kodak
- Type: Single-lens reflex
- Released: 18 March 2004

Lens
- Lens: Interchangeable (Canon EF mount)

Sensor/medium
- Sensor: FillFactory 135 format full-frame CMOS
- Maximum resolution: 4536 × 3024 (13.72 MP effective); 13.89 MP total (14 MP marketed)
- Storage media: Dual memory card slots: 1x CompactFlash (Type I or Type II) slot and 1× multi-format SD / MMC slot

Exposure/metering
- Exposure modes: Program AE, Shutter Priority AE, Aperture Priority AE, and Manual

Flash
- Flash: E-TTL flash, no built-in flash
- Flash synchronization: 1/180 sec

Shutter
- Frame rate: 1.7 fps
- Shutter speeds: 30s – 1/6000 sec, or Bulb

Viewfinder
- Viewfinder: Optical TTL pentaprism

General
- LCD screen: 1.8" 130,000 pixel TFT LCD
- AV port: Analog video out
- Data port(s): IEEE 1394 (FireWire), Serial, Remote Release Accessory, PC Sync port, and GPS via serial port
- Weight: 895 g (31.6 oz) (body only), 1050 g (37.0 oz) (with battery)

The Kodak Professional DCS Pro SLR/c is a 13.7-megapixel digital SLR camera produced by Eastman Kodak. It is full frame—it uses an image sensor that is the full size of a 35 mm (36x24 mm) frame. It is compatible with Canon EOS (EF mount) lenses. The camera was launched on March 18, 2004, and incorporates the internal systems of the previous Nikon-compatible SLR/n in a Sigma SA9 SLR body.

The DCS Pro SLR/c features a broad set of connectivity ports. It includes IEEE 1394/FireWire for computer connection and image transfer, along with a serial port, an analog video-out port, and a PC Sync terminal for external flash. Additionally, it supports a remote release/accessory connection and GPS via serial port.

Kodak officially discontinued both the SLR/c and the SLR/n on May 31, 2005, although remaining stock would be sold and the cameras would be fully supported through 2008. Kodak cited poor profitability of the sector in its announcement.

== See also ==
- Kodak DCS Pro SLR/n
- Kodak DCS
