= Kodak DCS Pro 14n =

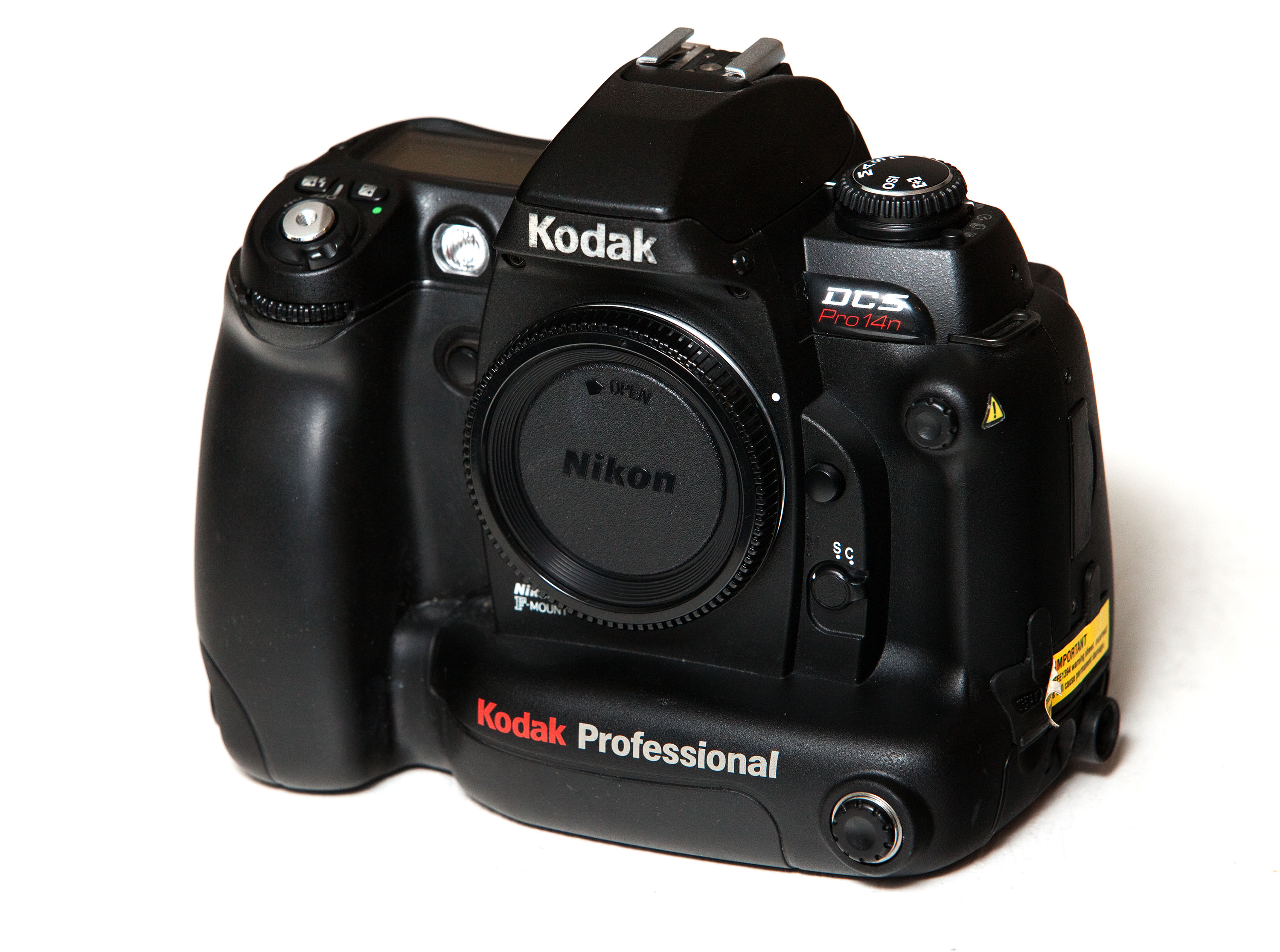
- Kodak DCS Pro 14n

Overview
- Maker: Eastman Kodak
- Type: Digital SLR

Lens
- Lens mount: Nikon F mount

Sensor/medium
- Sensor type: CMOS
- Sensor size: 24mm x 36mm
- Maximum resolution: 13.89 million pixels
- Film speed: ISO 80-400
- Recording medium: CompactFlash Type I/II, SD/MMC

Shutter
- Frame rate: 1.7 frame/s

The Kodak Professional DCS Pro 14n is a professional Nikon F80 based F-mount digital SLR produced by Eastman Kodak. It was announced at the photographic trade show photokina in Germany during September 2002; production examples became available in May 2003.

Featuring a 13.89 Megapixel (4560 x 3048 pixels total) full frame 24 x 36 mm CMOS sensor, the DCS Pro 14n was the second full-frame digital SLR to reach the market, after the unsuccessful and short lived Contax N Digital and came one day before the successful Canon EOS-1Ds . All previous digital SLRs had sensors smaller than a film frame and thus had a crop factor larger than 1.0, making a wide-angle field of view difficult to achieve.

In September 2003 Kodak announced the availability of a memory upgrade from 256 MB to 512 MB to DCS Pro 14n owners. The 512 MB version of the camera is often unofficially referred to as Kodak Professional DCS Pro 14n 512. A monochrome variant, known unofficially as Kodak Professional DCS Pro 14n m and based on the same CMOS image sensor, existed as well.

The DCS Pro 14n was replaced by the Kodak Professional DCS Pro SLR/n, released in 2004, which was a similar, but improved model. In particular, the new camera featured an improved image sensor and better power management, and it came with 512 MiB of buffer memory pre-installed. At around 1800 USD existing owners of the DCS 14n could order another camera upgrade from Kodak, comprising the new image sensor and memory upgrade. These upgraded cameras were officially referred to as Kodak Professional DCS Pro 14nx by Kodak. Except for the power management and name plate, they were basically the same as the DSC Pro SLR/n.

== See also ==
- Kodak DCS
