= Kodak DCS 300 series =

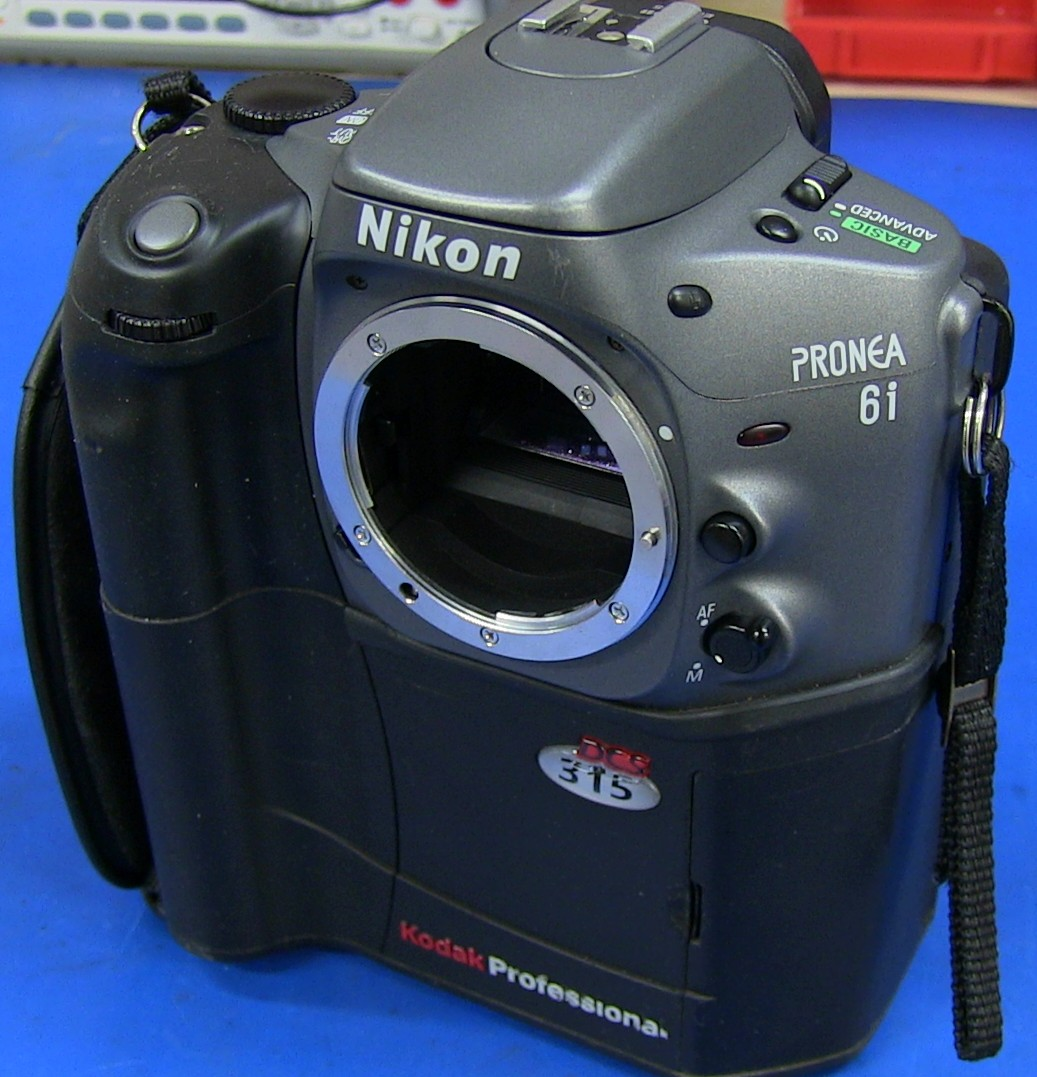
The Kodak DCS315 DSLR camera with Nikon Pronea 6i body

The Kodak DCS 300 series comprises two cameras, the DCS 315 and DCS 330. They are professional-level digital SLR cameras built by Eastman Kodak's Kodak Professional Imaging Solutions division. They were based on the Nikon Pronea 6i APS SLR camera and were aimed at a lower price point than other models in the Kodak DCS range. The 1.5 megapixel DCS 315 was launched in 1998, while the 3 megapixel DCS 330 was launched in 1999.

== Technical description ==
The two cameras have CCD image sensors with different sizes and shapes, both of which are smaller than either 135 film or APS-C film frames. The 315's imager has a crop factor of 2.6 relative to 135 film ("35mm"), while the 330's is larger, with a factor of 1.9.

Kodak DCS 300 series cameras
Spec Camera	Image sensor			ISO range	Dimensions	
Spec Camera	Res.	Size	Aspect ratio	ISO range	W×H×D	Weight
DCS 315	1520×1008	1", 13.7×9.1 mm (0.54×0.36 in)	3:2	100–400	137×174×76 mm (5.4×6.9×3.0 in)	1.8 kg (4.0 lb)
DCS 330	2008×1504	18.1×13.5 mm (0.71×0.53 in)	4:3	125–400	137×174×76 mm (5.4×6.9×3.0 in)	1.08 kg (2.4 lb)

The Kodak modification to the Pronea 6i involved removing the camera's film back and mounting a Kodak digital back. This not only covers the back of the camera, but also extends beneath it, approximately doubling the camera's height. This was required to accommodate the large PC cards used as storage media, the six AA batteries required to power the camera, and the circuitry for image processing. The Kodak back has two display screens. The upper is a full-color screen used for viewing taken shots. The lower LCD displays the camera's settings.

An infrared filter is mounted just behind the lens mount. This has to be removed in order to fit certain Nikkor lenses, including IX-Nikkor line of lenses originally designed for the APS format Pronea 6i.

The DCS 315 is substantially faster than the 330, since only half as much data needs to be stored per shot. The 315 also allows image storage in the smaller JPEG format, while the 330 only allows Kodak's proprietary .TIF RAW format.

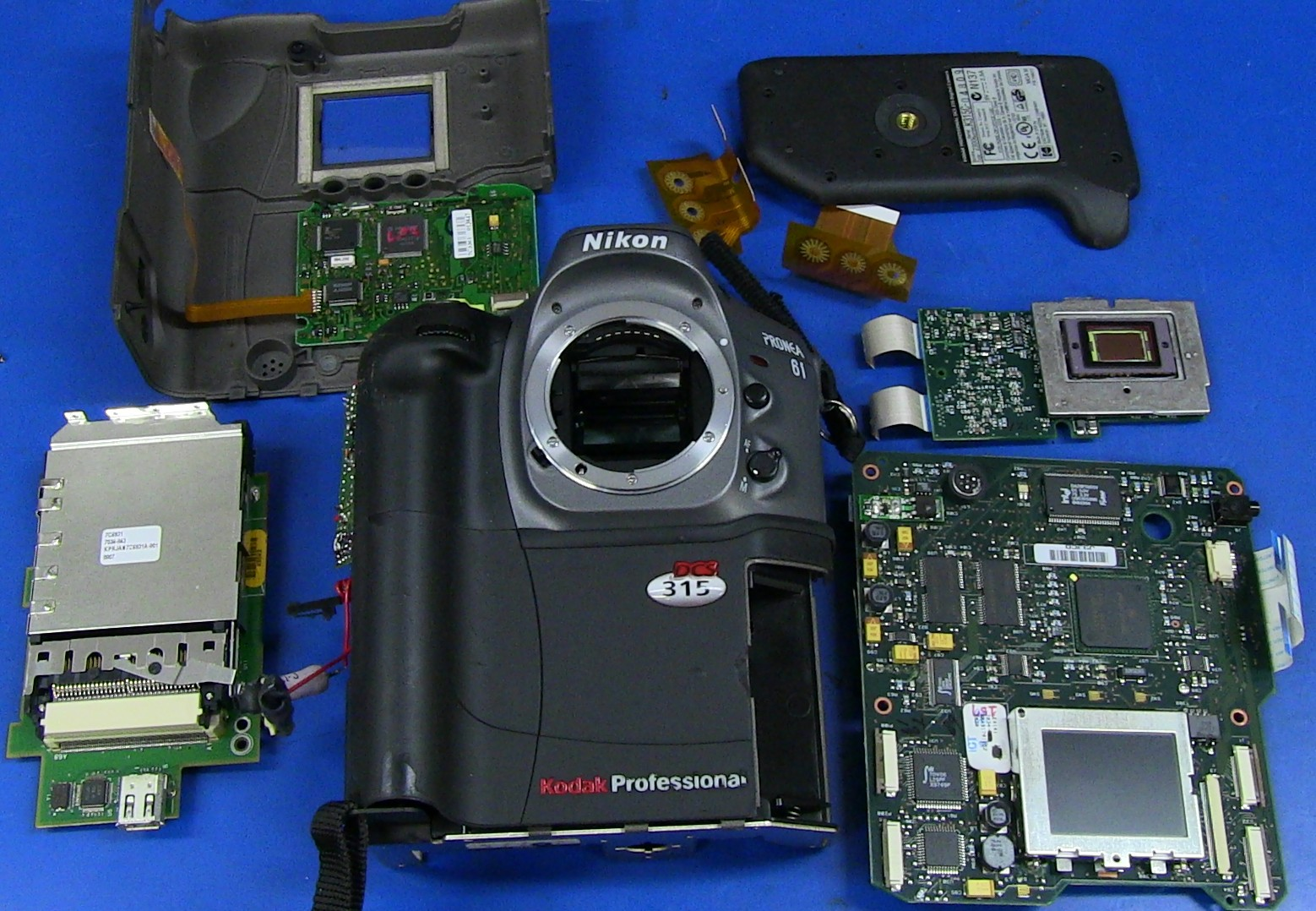
The main components inside the Kodak DCS315 DSLR camera with Nikon Pronea 6i body

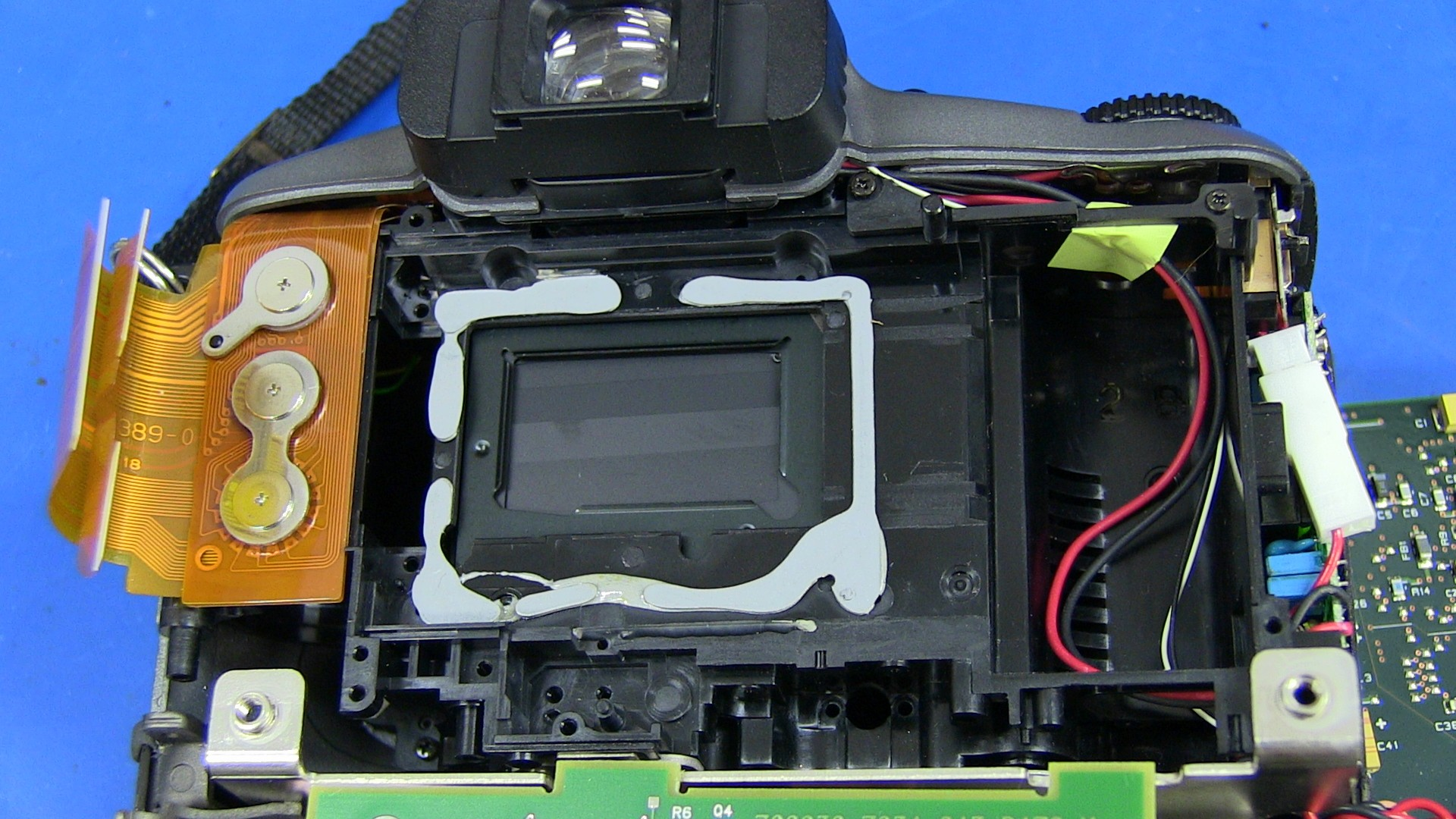
The Kodak DCS315 DSLR camera with Nikon Pronea 6i body showing the existing unused film transport mechanism

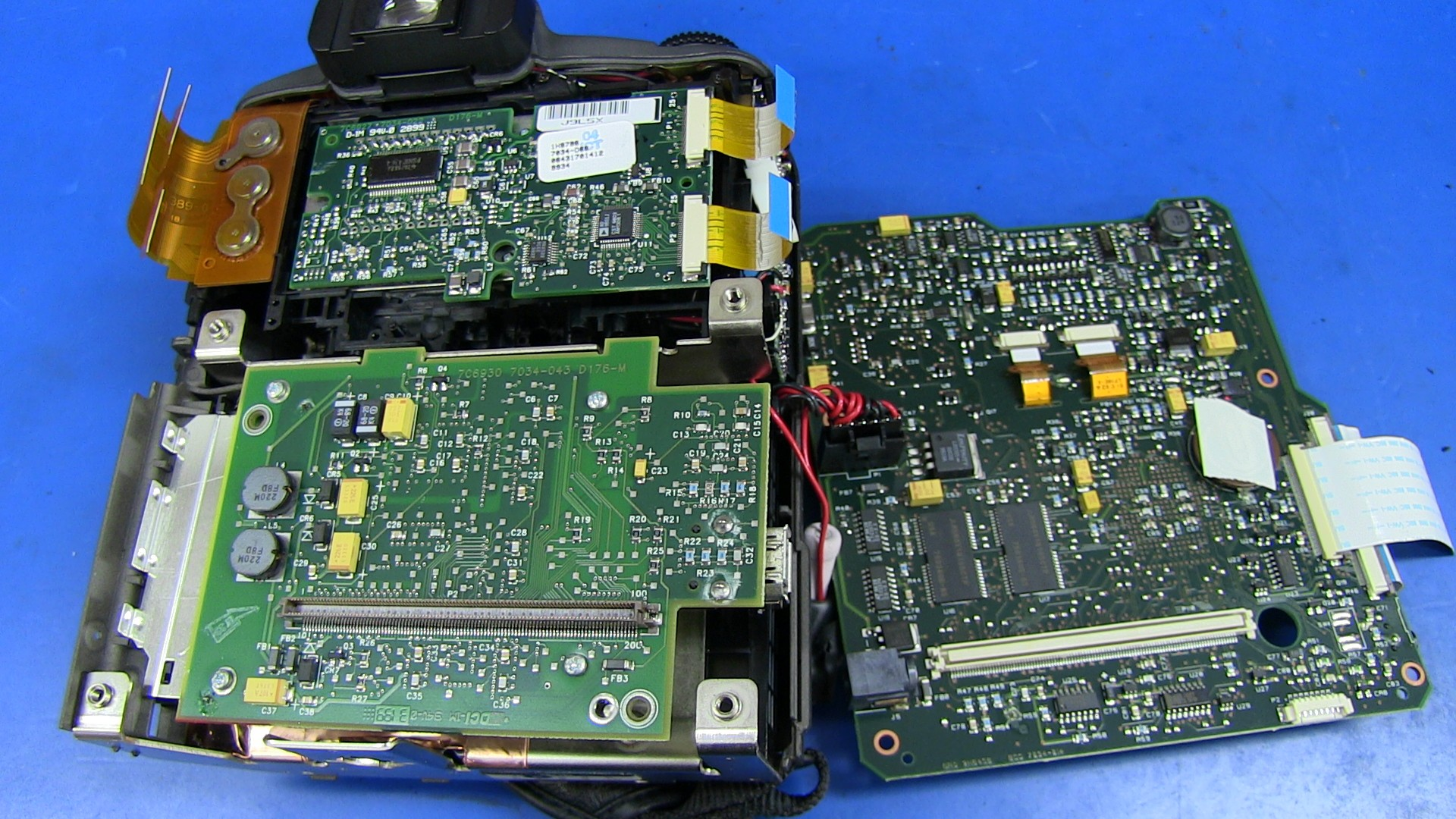
The Kodak DCS315 DSLR camera with main PCB's folded out

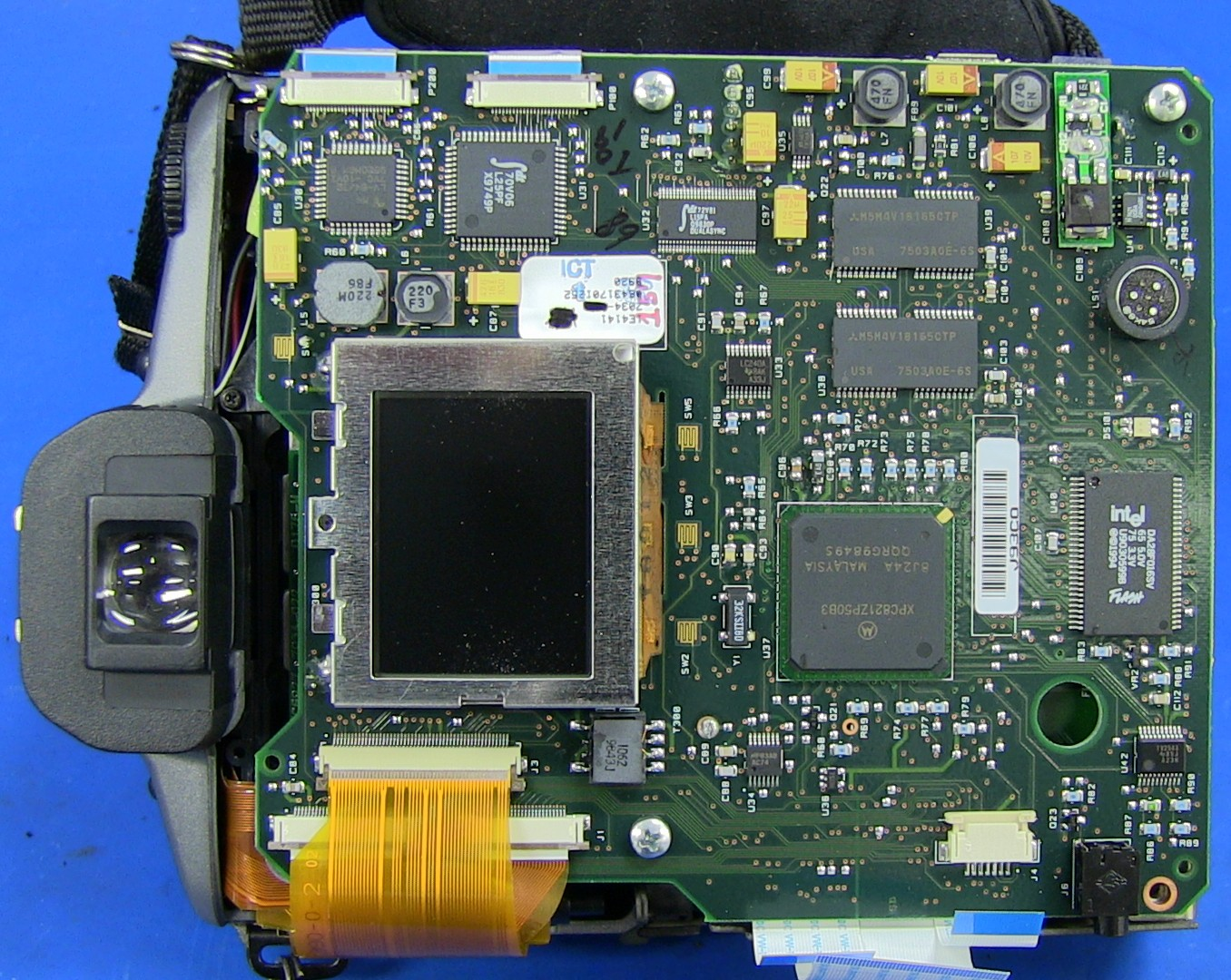
Kodak DCS315 DSLR Rear PCB with main processor

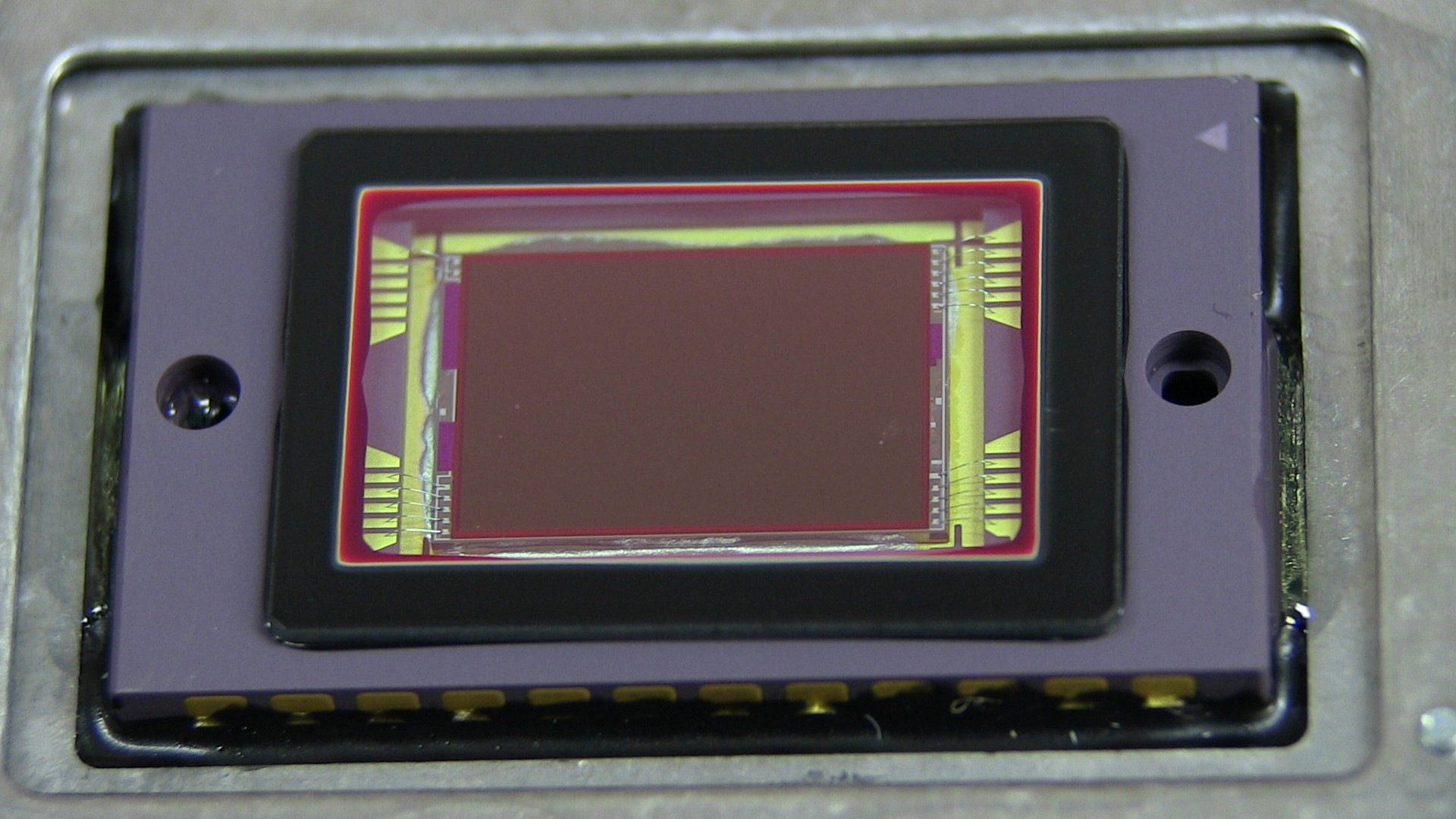
The 1.5Mpixel Kodak DCS315 CCD Sensor

== See also ==
- Kodak DCS
