= Kodak DCS 100 =

First commercial DSLR camera

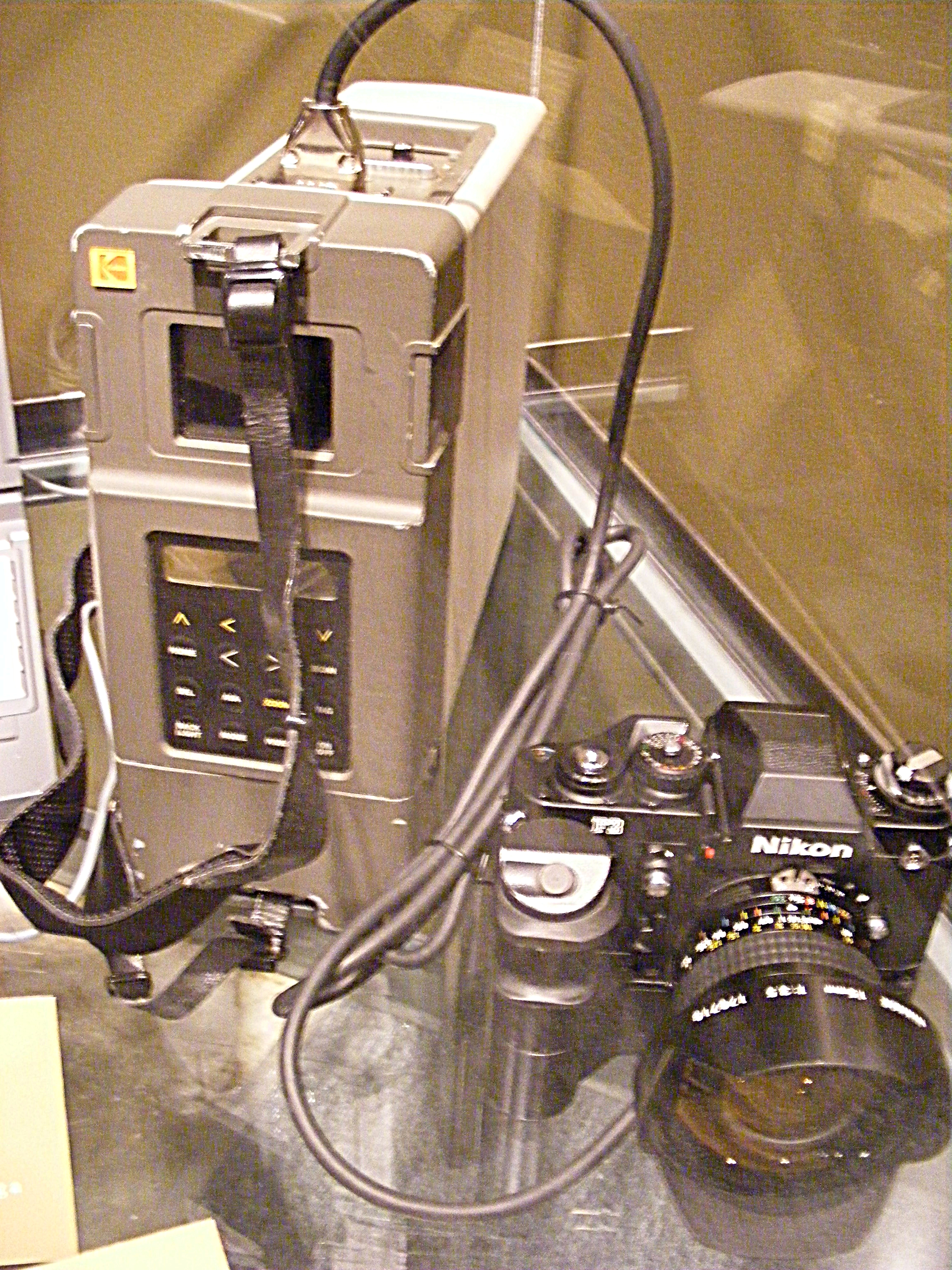
Kodak DCS 100, based on a Nikon F3 body with Digital Storage Unit.

The Kodak Professional Digital Camera System or DCS, later unofficially named DCS 100, was the first commercially available digital single-lens reflex (DSLR) camera. It was a customized camera back bearing the digital image sensor, mounted on a Nikon F3 body and released by Kodak in May 1991; the company had previously shown the camera at Photokina in 1990. Aimed at the photo journalism market in order to improve the speed with which photographs could be transmitted back to the studio or newsroom, the DCS had a resolution of 1.3 megapixels. The DCS was publicly presented for the first time in Arles (France), at the Journées de l'Image Pro by Mr. Ray H. DeMoulin, the worldwide President of the Eastman Kodak Company. 453 international journalists attended this presentation, which took place in the Palais des Congrès of Arles.

The predecessor to the commercial Digital Still Camera (DCS) was prototyped in the spring of 1987 at Kodak Research Labs. A 1.3 megapixel imager had been produced by Kodak’s Microelectronics Technology Division and the logical next step was to build a high resolution digital imaging system around it. The DCS prototype was developed for trials by the Associated Press. Kodak researchers chose the Nikon F3HP SLR because it was the most widely used professional camera at the time.

The F3HP had motor drive contacts that provided signals sufficient for electronic synchronization. A set of potential lenses underwent MTF testing and best matched lenses were selected. The battery power and a hard drive were integrated into a tethered remote system to be worn on the shoulder while the photographer worked. The A/D converter output was processed to generate an exposure histogram for the photographer. Finally, since the 1.3MP imager was smaller than the full 35mm film frame, colored templates were added to the viewfinder to indicate the area the imager would capture.

The prototype system was tested extensively in 1987 and 1988 by AP photographers and in studies comparing its performance to film systems. There was enough enthusiasm for the system to undertake a commercial version. An early version was shown at Photokina in 1990 and the product was launched in May 1991.

The DCS retained many of the characteristics of the prototype, including a separate shoulder carried Digital Storage Unit (DSU) to store and to visualize the images, and to house the batteries. The DSU contained a 3.5" 200 megabyte SCSI hard disk drive that could store up to 156 images without compression, or up to 600 images using a JPEG compatible compression board that was offered later as an optional extra. It connects to a computer via an external SCSI interface. It appears as a non-disk SCSI device, and can be accessed by a TWAIN-based plugin for Photoshop 3. An external keyboard allowed entry of captions and other image information.

The Kodak Professional Digital Camera System was available with two different digital format backs. The DC3 color back used a custom color filter array layout. The DM3 monochrome back had no color filter array. A few DM3 backs were manufactured without IR filters.

There were many models of the DCS with different buffers, monochrome, color, transmission versions with keyboard and modem.

The system was marketed at a retail price of $20000. A total of 987 units were sold.

== See also ==
- Kodak DCS
