= Kodak DCS Pro SLR/n =

Overview
- Maker: Kodak
- Type: Single-lens reflex

Lens
- Lens: Interchangeable (Nikon F-mount)

Sensor/medium
- Sensor: 36 mm × 24 mm CMOS
- Maximum resolution: 4,500 × 3000 (13.5 million)
- Film speed: 6/12/25/50/80–800 in 1/3 stops, 1600 RAW only
- Storage media: CompactFlash (Type I or Type II) | SD Card

Focusing
- Focus modes: AF-S, AF-C, M
- Focus areas: 5 AF points

Exposure/metering
- Exposure metering: 3D Matrix Metering
- Metering modes: 3D Matrix, center average, spot

Flash
- Flash: pop-up, sync at 1/125 second

Shutter
- Shutter: Electronically controlled focal-plane
- Shutter speed range: 1/4000 to 2 sec., bulb
- Continuous shooting: Approx. 1.7 frame/s

Viewfinder
- Viewfinder: Optical

General
- LCD screen: 2.0 inch, 130,000 pixels
- Battery: Li-ion battery pack, 2 unprotected 103450 elements and charge/discharge controller inside.
- Weight: 35.3 oz. / 1000g

The Kodak Professional DCS Pro SLR/n is a 13.5 megapixel (4500x3000 pixels) full-frame 35mm digital SLR produced as a collaboration between Nikon Corporation and Eastman Kodak. It was an improved version of the Kodak Professional DCS Pro 14n series, and was based on a modified Nikon N80 film SLR and thus compatible with almost all Nikon F mount lenses. The camera was announced in early 2004 and became available to purchase mid-year. A monochrome variant named Kodak Professional DCS Pro SLR/n m of the camera existed as well.

The camera has no anti-aliasing filter in front of the CMOS sensor, which gives it very high edge acuity, but gives it a greater chance of producing more moire artifacts than most cameras. This can be partially compensated for with the software, which has advanced noise reduction capabilities. It also has impressively high dynamic range (the ability to capture both light and dark subjects well in the same image). It has less of a useful range of ISO sensitivity than many modern digital SLR cameras, although the selectable range is very large.

The camera is very unusual for a DSLR in having a long exposure setting where film speeds down to 6 ASA and exposure settings up to 60 seconds can be selected. This would have been useful for Product Photography.

The cousin of this camera, the Kodak Professional DCS Pro SLR/c, announced a month later, shared the same full 35 mm (36x24 mm) frame sized CMOS image sensor, electronics, and most controls, but was based on the top of the Sigma Corporation's SLR cameras (such as the SD9) and a custom body, and was compatible with Canon Inc.'s EOS lenses.

Both cameras were discontinued on May 31, 2005

== See also ==
- Kodak DCS Pro 14n, its predecessor
- Kodak DCS Pro SLR/c, its Canon-compatible equivalent, using a body supplied by Sigma
- Kodak DCS
