= Nikon F80 =

35-film SLR camera model

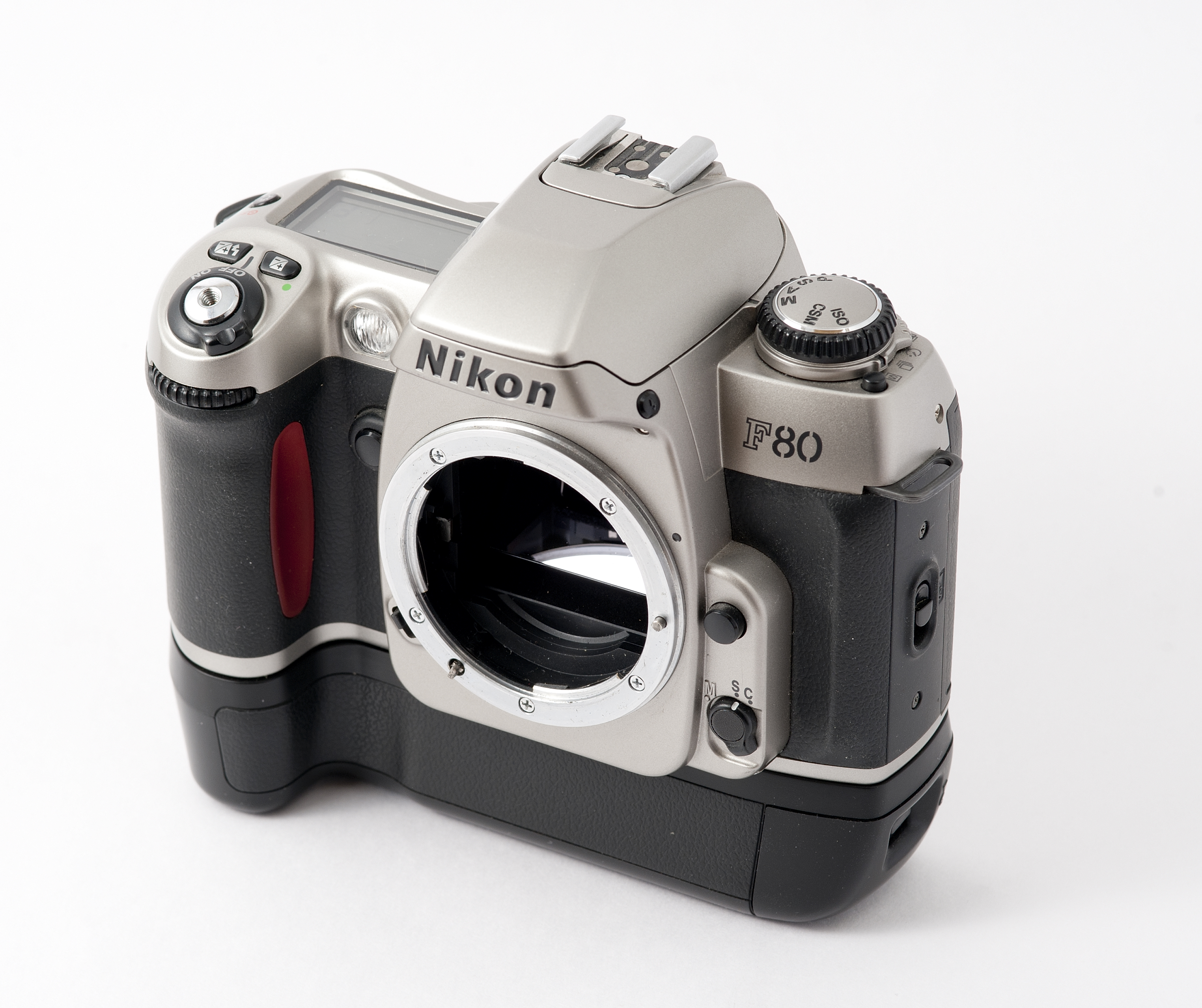
- A silver Nikon F80 with battery grip (MB-16)

Overview
- Maker: Nikon
- Type: 35 mm SLR camera
- Released: 2000
- Production: 2000–2006

Lens
- Lens mount: Nikon F lens mount

Focusing
- Focus: TTL Phase Detection Autofocus (5 zone, center cross-type)

Exposure/metering
- Exposure: Program, Aperture priority, Shutter priority and depth-of-field autoexposure; manual 3D Matrix, centre-weighted; 75% of the exposure over 12 mm area, spot-metering over 4 mm

Flash
- Flash: 12/39 (at ISO 100, m/ft.) speedlight built in, standard Hot shoe

Shutter
- Frame rate: 2.5 frame/s

General
- Dimensions: 141.5×98.5×71 mm (5.57×3.88×2.80 in)
- Weight: 515 g (18 oz) (1.135 lb)
- Made in: Thailand

The Nikon F80 (or N80 as it is known in the U.S.) is an SLR prosumer camera manufactured by Nikon, released in January 2000.

== History ==
The F80 was introduced on January 27, 2000, to the worldwide consumer market. It was the successor to the F70 and was based on the highly successful F100 with the notable lack of the weatherproofing and ruggedness that characterizes that camera.

Three versions of the F80 are available, the F80, the F80D which has a different back that can imprint date information on the frame and the F80S which can also imprint exposure data between frames in addition to the date information. Using the exposure data imprint function will slow the F80 varying on film speed and temperature.

== Design and construction ==
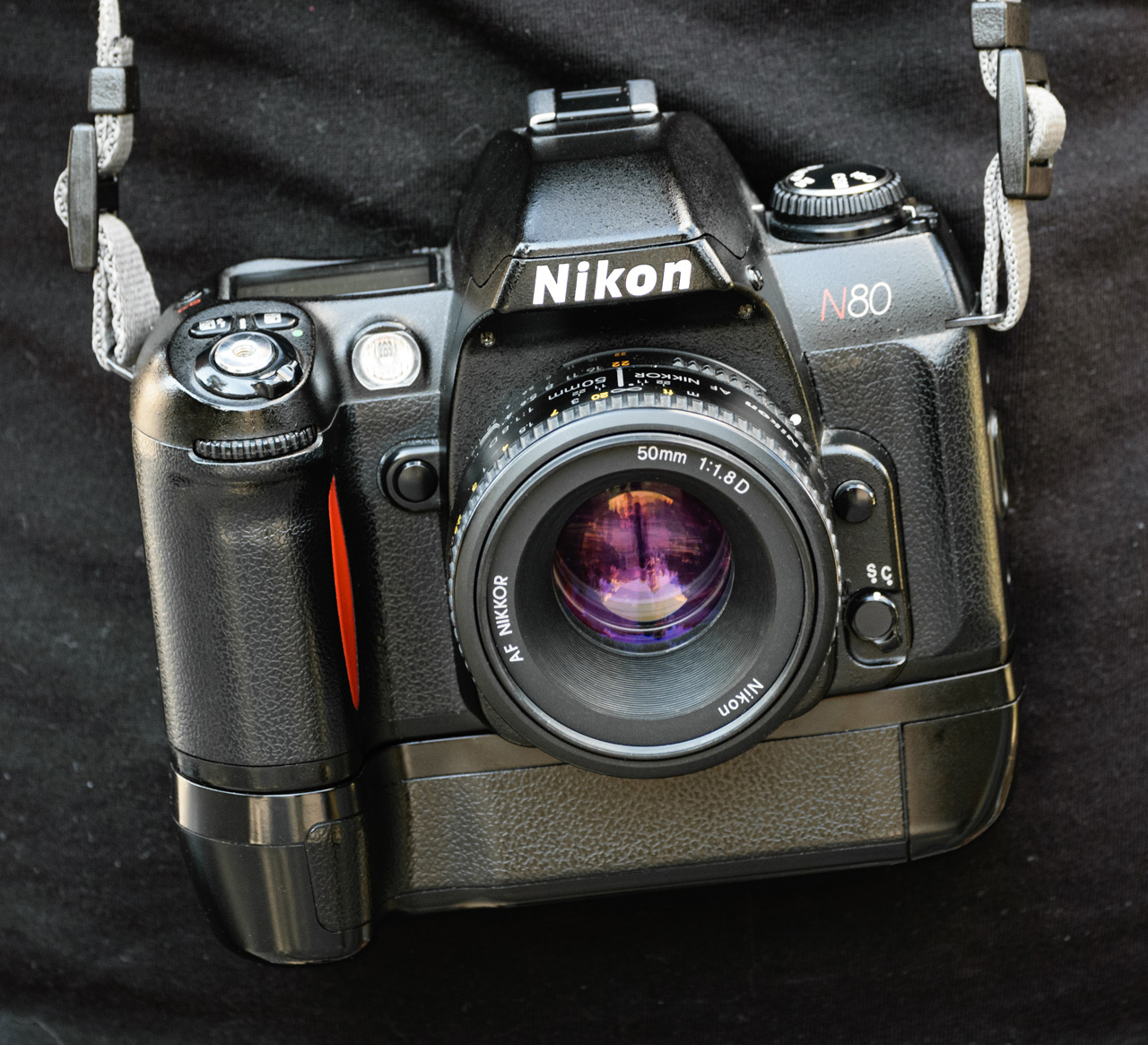
Black variant Nikon F80 (N80) with MB-16 battery grip and Nikkor AF 50mm f/1.8D

The black F80 keeps with the traditional look of Nikon camera bodies, with a black plastic exterior, white Nikon lettering on the prism with a red rubber insert on the inside of the camera's grip. The F80 also has a silver (white chrome) variant, which has a silver plastic exterior with black Nikon lettering.

The F80 accepts all F-mount Nikkor lenses with the exception of many pre AI, and all IX, lenses (these cannot be mounted on the F80 without causing damage). Older non-CPU AI and AIS lenses can be mounted on the camera, but exposure must be set manually as the camera will not meter through them at all.

The F80 was the first Nikon camera to feature on-demand grid lines.

The F80 was chosen by Nikon to be the basis for the popular Nikon D100 digital SLR. The chassis was also used by Fujifilm as the basis for the FinePix S2 Pro and S3 Pro, and by Eastman Kodak for the Kodak DCS Pro 14n and DCS Pro SLR/n.

Rumors were abound during 2005 that Nikon would make a successor to the F80, and discontinue most other film cameras apart from the F6 and the F80 replacement. Early in 2006 Nikon announced that they intend to drop production of all film cameras apart from the F6 and FM10. Regardless of whether Nikon had actually developed (or even planned) a successor for the F80, it never appeared on the market.

Class	1950s					1960s										1970s										1980s										1990s										2000s										2020s			
Class	55	56	57	58	59	60	61	62	63	64	65	66	67	68	69	70	71	72	73	74	75	76	77	78	79	80	81	82	83	84	85	86	87	88	89	90	91	92	93	94	95	96	97	98	99	00	01	02	03	04	05	06	07	08	09	...	20	21	22
Professional					F																					F3																																	
Professional																	F2												F3AF					F4								F5								F6									
High-end																													FA					F-801 (N8008)/ F-801s (N8008s)				F90 (N90)		F90X (N90s)					F100														
Mid-range																																F-501 (N2020)				F-601 (N6006)				F70 (N70)						F80 (N80)													
Mid-range																		EL / EL2 /ELW						FE					FE2							F-601M (N6000)				F70 (N70)						F80 (N80)													
Mid-range											FT		FTn/ FT2/ FT3										FM					FM2																			FM3A												
Mid-range											FS												FM					FM2																			FM3A												
Entry-level																																																											
Entry-level																																										Pronea S																	
Entry-level																																									Pronea 600i/6i																		
Entry-level								Nikkorex F / Nikkor J																	EM			FG			F-301 (N2000)				F-401s (N4004s)					F50 (N50)							F65 (N65 / U)		F75 (N75 / U2)										
Entry-level						35		35 II		Auto 35																				FG-20			F-401 (N4004)				F-401x (N5005)								F60 (N60)			F55 (N55)											
Entry-level									Zoom 35																																FM10 / FE10																		
Class	55	56	57	58	59	60	61	62	63	64	65	66	67	68	69	70	71	72	73	74	75	76	77	78	79	80	81	82	83	84	85	86	87	88	89	90	91	92	93	94	95	96	97	98	99	00	01	02	03	04	05	06	07	08	09	...	20	21	22
Class	1950s					1960s										1970s										1980s										1990s										2000s										2020s			
