= Kodak DCS 400 series =

Pioneering 1990s professional digital SLR cameras

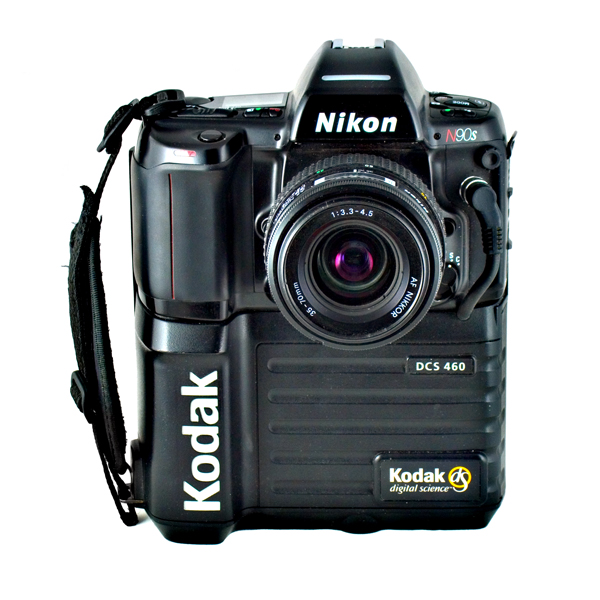
Kodak DCS 460

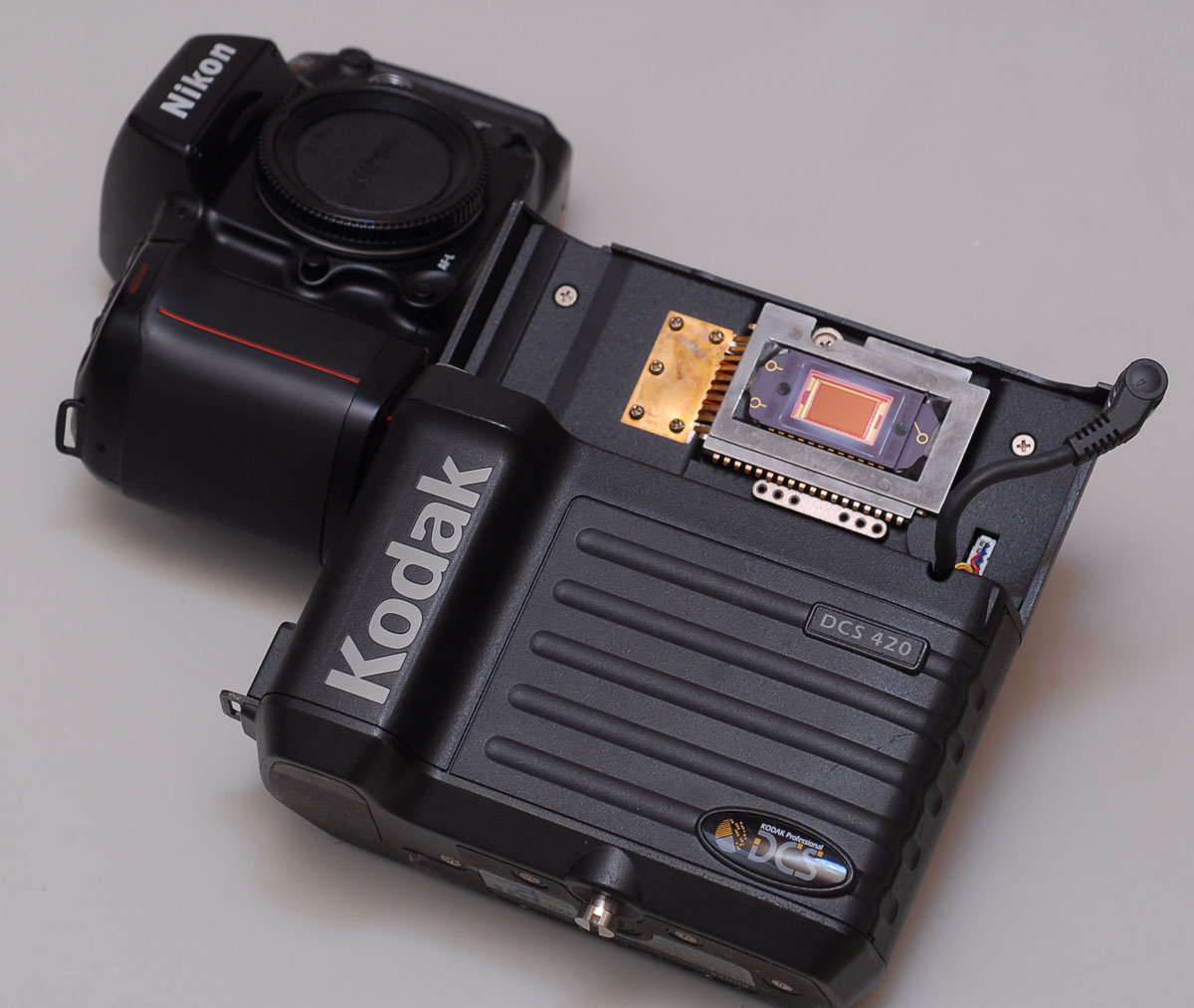
A DCS 420 in sensor cleaning mode

The Kodak DCS 400 series was a series of Nikon based digital SLR cameras with sensor and added electronics produced by Eastman Kodak. It was part of Kodak's DCS (Digital Camera System) line.

The cameras in this series include the 1.5-megapixel DCS 420 (introduced in August 1994), the 1.5-mpx DCS 410 (introduced in 1996), and the 6.2-mpx DCS 460 (introduced in March 1995). In addition, Kodak sold a version of the back from the DCS 460 adapted for medium format bodies as the DCS 465. Kodak also made a camera especially for Associated Press. It was called NC2000 (based on the Nikon N90/F90), later upgraded to NC2000e (based on the Nikon N90s/F90x) using many of the same components as were used for the DCS 400 series. Kodak also used the imaging component and electronics of the DCS 420 to produce a digital version of the Nikonos underwater camera, which was produced in limited numbers for military and scientific applications as the Kodak DCS 425.

In addition to the standard colour version, Kodak made monochrome and infrared versions of the DCS 420, which were made to order as the 420m and 420IR respectively. There were also monochrome versions of the DCS 460 and DCS 465, with the same nomenclature. The non-colour versions are very rare and tend to collect high prices at auctions and second-hand brokers.

The DCS 400-series were based on the Nikon N90s 35 mm film camera (called F90x in Europe). The DCS 410 and some early versions of the DCS 420 and 460 were based on the Nikon N90/F90 body. After the Nikon N90s/F90x was introduced in late 1994, Kodak started using that model as basis for the DCS 400-series. The camera body could be converted back to a film camera by removing the digital component, and replacing the digital back with a standard back.

All cameras in the series used a 12 bit/channel CCD. The 1.5 Mpx sensor used in the DCS 410 and DCS 420 measures 9.2x13.8 mm (2.6x crop factor compared to the 35 mm film format). The 6.2 Mpx sensor used in the DCS 460 and DCS 465 measures 18.4x27.6mm (1.3x crop). The 1.3 Mpx sensor used in the NC2000 and NC2000e measures 16.4x20.5mm (1.6x crop) with an unusual aspect ratio (5:4).

In 1995, the DCS 460 was the highest resolution digital camera available and its list price was US$35,600. When it closed out in November 2000, the price had dropped to US$2,500.

== See also ==
- Kodak DCS
