= Nikon F90 =

1992 35mm single-lens reflex camera

Nikon F90 Nikon F90X
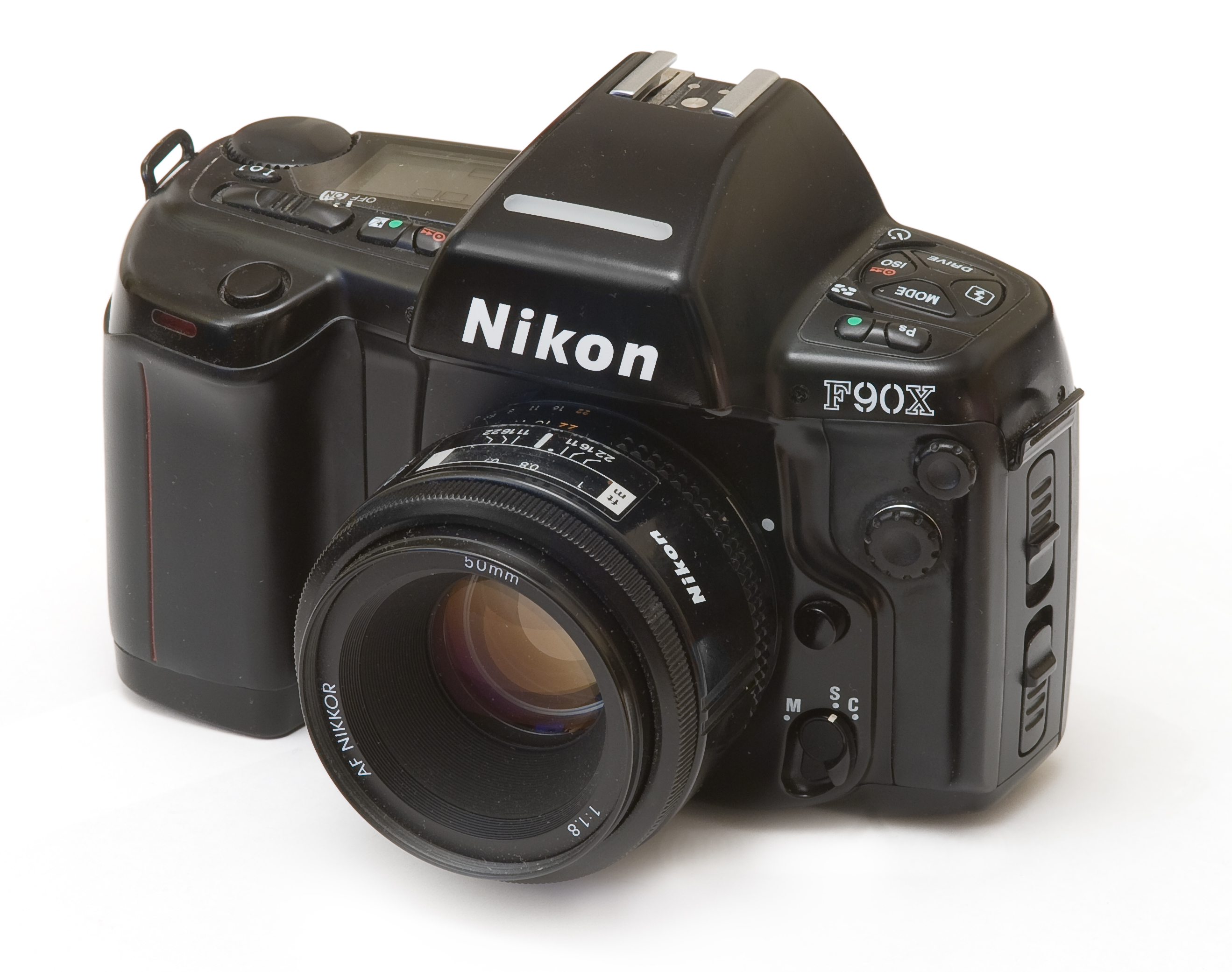

Overview
- Maker: Nikon
- Type: Single-lens reflex

Lens
- Lens mount: Nikon F
- Lens: Interchangeable

Sensor/medium
- Film format: 135 film
- Film size: 36×24 mm

Focusing
- Focus: TTL Phase Detection Autofocus (1 zone)

Exposure/metering
- Exposure: PSAM autoexposure 3D Matrix Metering

Shutter
- Frame rate: 4.3 frame/s

General
- Dimensions: 154×106×69 mm (6.1×4.2×2.7 in)
- Weight: 755 g (26.6 oz)
- Made in: Japan

The Nikon F90 (known as the N90 in the United States) is a 35mm SLR camera manufactured in Japan between 1992 and 2001 and replaced the earlier Nikon F-801 (N8008 in the U.S.). At the time of its release it was noted for its fast autofocus speed compared to previous Nikon models, which had lagged behind competitor Canon's. It was thus seen by many as a 'stop-gap' measure to prevent the mass migration of many Nikon-using professional photographers to Canon, as Nikon's next fully professional camera, the F5, was some time away from release. The Nikon F4, the professional model available at the time of the F90's release, had very slow autofocus compared to Canon's autofocus SLRs.

The Nikon F90's autofocus system was driven by a small 'peanut' motor in the camera body that drove the lens via a mechanical link, unlike Canon's autofocus system, which used motors built into each lens. It was also the first Nikon SLR to interoperate with the first generation of Nikkor lenses featuring internal focusing motor.

Despite not being intended for the professional market, the Nikon F90 and its upgrade, the F90x, were built to a high standard and were (and are still) used by many professionals.

However, many F90 and F90x bodies had problems with the rubberized back, where the rubberized coating would start peeling or disintegrating into a surface sticky to the touch. The rubber around the grip and other parts were not affected. This did not affect the functionality of the back but was a nuisance to users. The rubberised coating can however be removed (Once the door has been unclipped and safely removed from the camera body) by rubbing gently with a microfibre towel or similar soaked in plenty of isopropyl alcohol. This procedure will remove the rubberised top coating without affecting the surface finish of the underlying plastic or the clear film viewing window. The white printed "Vari Program" icons will remain unaffected also. The end result is a hard semi-gloss finish the same as the camera's top plate.

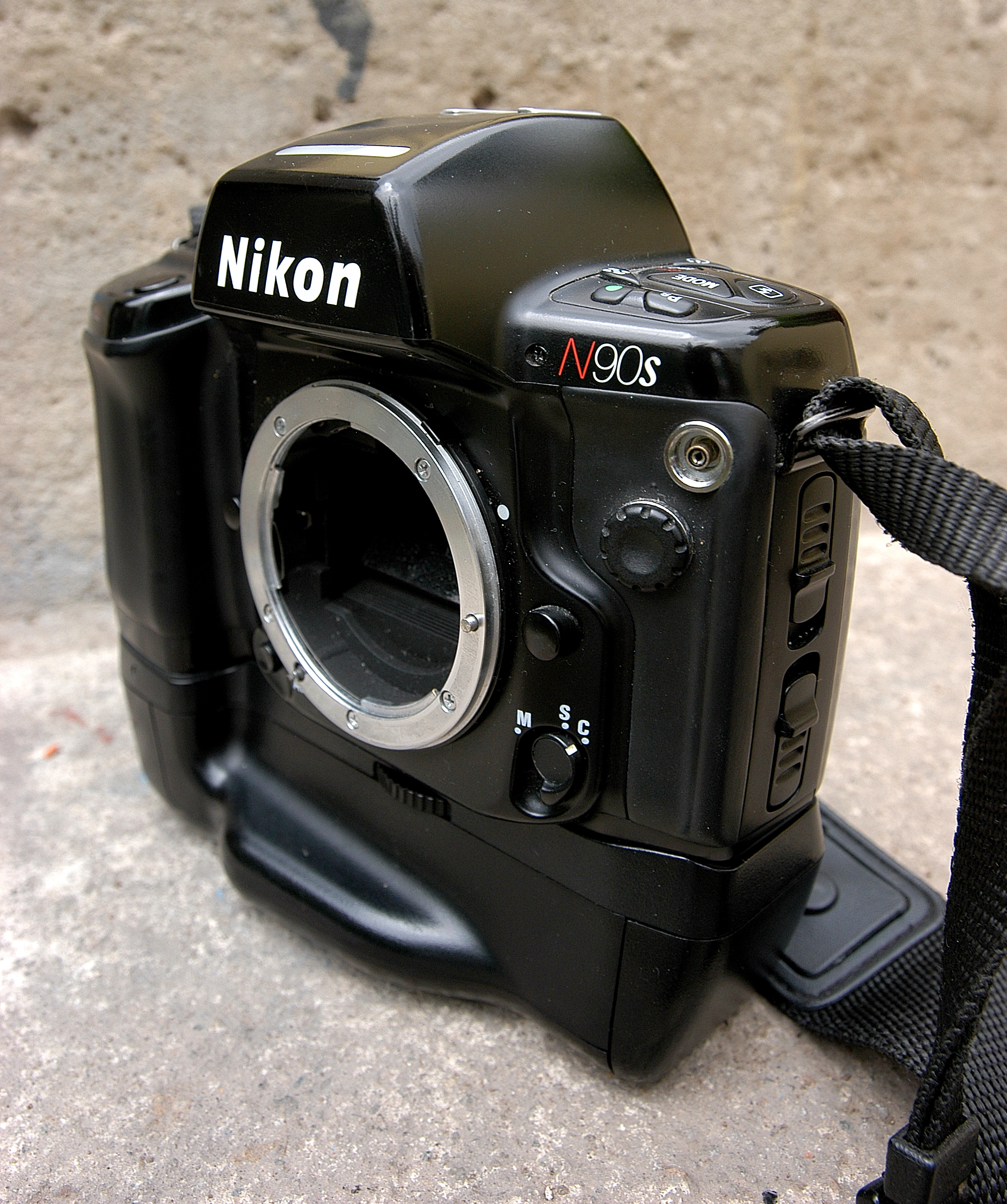
The Nikon N90s body with MB10 battery grip

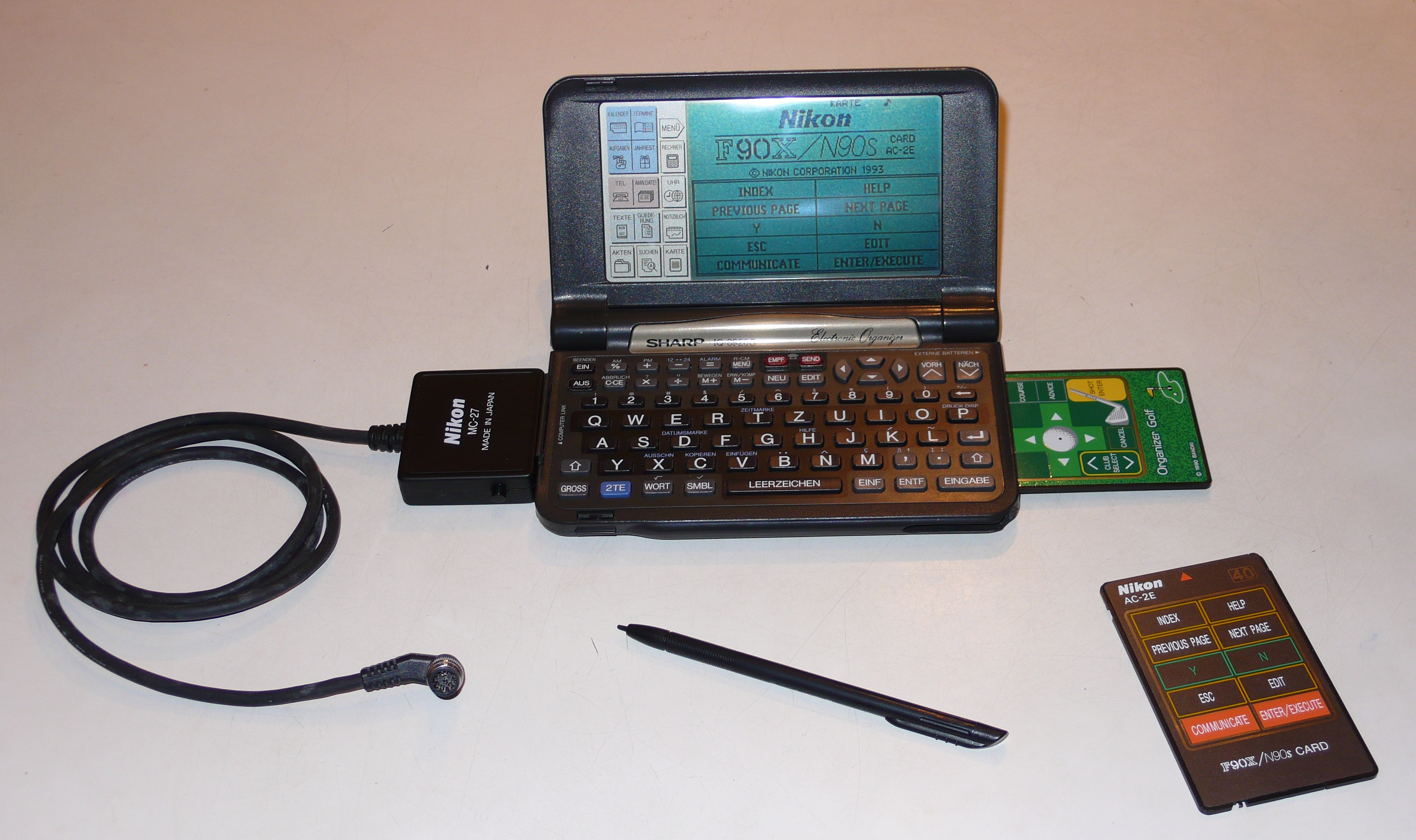
Nikon AC-2E Data Link System (1993)

The Nikon F90x (known in the United States as the N90s) was a slightly upgraded version of the F90. Differences included faster and more accurate autofocus and shutter speed adjustments in thirds of a stop versus the full-stop increments of the F90. Frame rate was also increased, along with several other minor upgrades. Weather sealing was also improved. In addition, it eliminated the beeping function of the F90.

== Accessories ==
Nikon N90, F90, N90s and F90x had some accessories that improve the use of these cameras.

The optional MB-10 battery grip which takes 4 AA batteries and which fits on to the base of the camera was also introduced. The MB-10 added a vertical-grip shutter release and provides a larger grip area which is especially useful when a large lens is attached to the body. The MB-10 will fully work only on the F90x and N90s models. Plain N90 and F90 models will receive and mount the MB10, but the vertical shutter controls will not work as they lack the necessary internal electrical contacts in the battery chamber. As the MB-10 operates from exactly the same 4 "AA" cells as the camera body alone, there is no increase in continuous shooting speed or AF speed as in some cameras such as the F4 / F4S. The grip is simply a convenience and handling feature. The operational speed, battery duration and frame rate of the F90X remain identical either with or without the MB-10.

The MF-26 data back, allows the user to change the camera's configuration on demand and without using a PC, and creates a powerful set for film photography. The fully programmable MF-26 expands camera's option including multiple exposure, interval & delay mode, very long exposure times (up to 12h), and can be non-continuous if set on automatic, world time zones, flash exposure bracketing and data imprinting.

Table of F90 variant designations
Designation	Description
F90/N90	base model
F90D	base model + MF-25
F90S	base model + MF-26
F90X/N90s	upgraded version
F90XD	upgraded version + MF-25
F90XS	upgraded version + MF-26

The F90 (and subsequent F90x) features a 10-pin remote release socket. The MC-30 is available as a corded remote release and the ML-3 offered as a wireless option. The older MC-20 is also available.

A minor annoyance with the camera is that the cover caps for the remote-control socket and PC Sync sockets are not tethered to the body, and so are very easy to lose or misplace in use. Fortunately, these caps are common to many Nikon models (F100, D2, etc.) and so are readily and cheaply available.

== Compatibility ==
The F90/F90x uses lenses with the Nikon F mount.

It is the first camera to support 3D TTL flash metering with D lenses.

Newer G lenses without aperture rings only fully function under shutter priority and program modes. It does work under manual or aperture priority, however only at the minimum aperture.

Newer VR lenses will work without VR functionality on this camera.

Unlike the earlier F-801/F-801s, the F90/F90x supports autofocus with the AF-I/AF-S series lenses with built-in motors.

DX lenses are not recommended as they do not cover the full 35mm frame and will lead to vignetting; however they still will function if use is desired.

Manual focus lenses will work if they are AI or AI converted, albeit with only center weighted and spot metering available. The arrows on the bottom left hand corner of the viewfinder are used to check focus. AI-P lenses, however, will enable matrix metering. non-AI lenses will damage the camera if mounted and the user should not attempt to mount these.

== Kodak DCS 400 ==
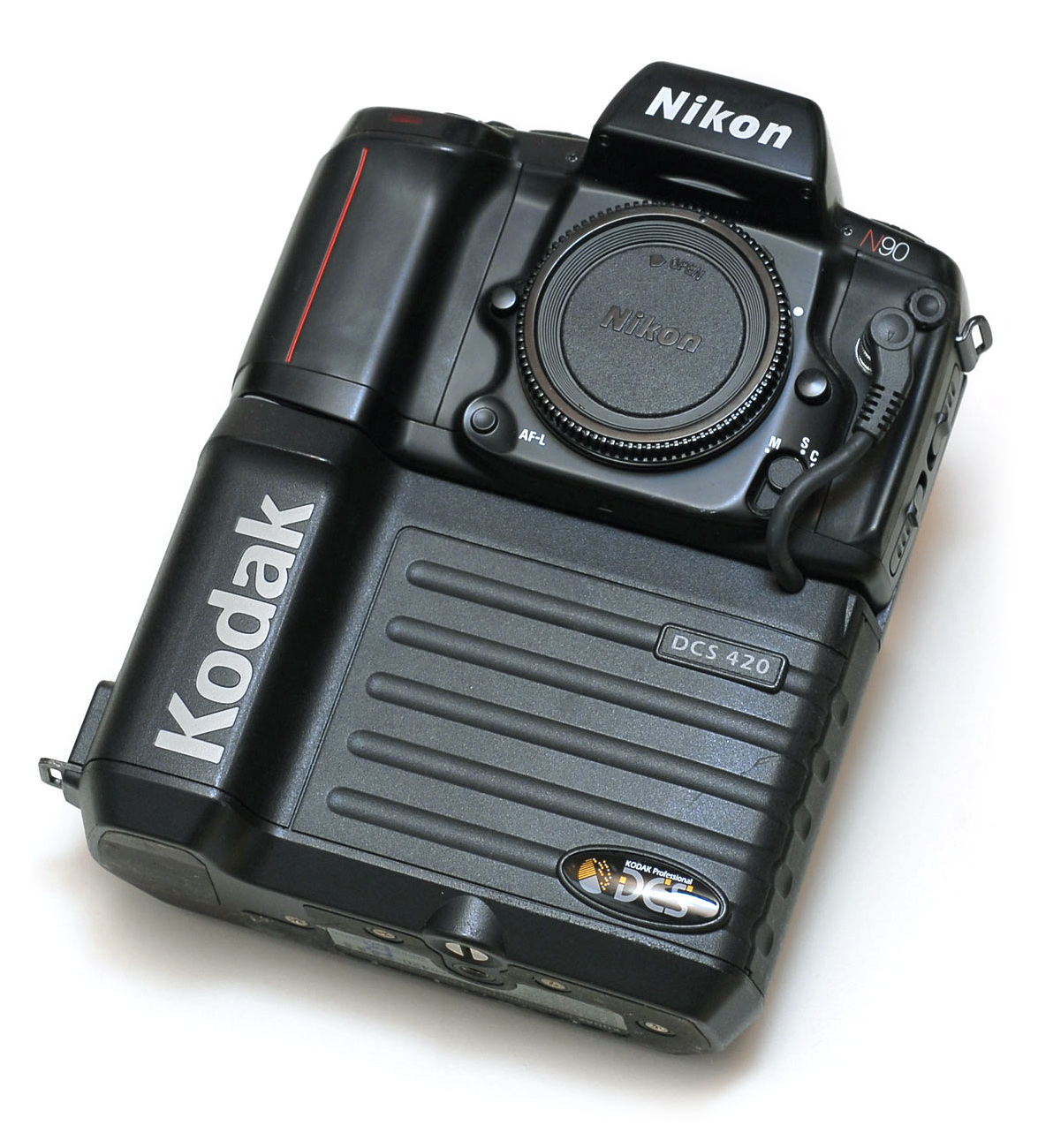
The Kodak DCS 420 was based on a Nikon N90 body with a Kodak-designed digital camera back attached.

In collaboration with Nikon, Kodak used F90 and F90s bodies as the basis for the Kodak DCS 400 series of digital SLRs. The DCS 410 and early DCS 420 models used the F90 (badged as N90), and the later DCS 420, DCS 460, and NC2000 used the F90x (badged N90s). The cameras were mounted, with minor modifications, on a Kodak digital back.

The Kodak/Nikon N90S-based digital camera system was purchased by NASA and used on both the Space Shuttle programs and on the International Space Station.

Class	1950s					1960s										1970s										1980s										1990s										2000s										2020s			
Class	55	56	57	58	59	60	61	62	63	64	65	66	67	68	69	70	71	72	73	74	75	76	77	78	79	80	81	82	83	84	85	86	87	88	89	90	91	92	93	94	95	96	97	98	99	00	01	02	03	04	05	06	07	08	09	...	20	21	22
Professional					F																					F3																																	
Professional																	F2												F3AF					F4								F5								F6									
High-end																													FA					F-801 (N8008)/ F-801s (N8008s)				F90 (N90)		F90X (N90s)					F100														
Mid-range																																F-501 (N2020)				F-601 (N6006)				F70 (N70)						F80 (N80)													
Mid-range																		EL / EL2 /ELW						FE					FE2							F-601M (N6000)				F70 (N70)						F80 (N80)													
Mid-range											FT		FTn/ FT2/ FT3										FM					FM2																			FM3A												
Mid-range											FS												FM					FM2																			FM3A												
Entry-level																																																											
Entry-level																																										Pronea S																	
Entry-level																																									Pronea 600i/6i																		
Entry-level								Nikkorex F / Nikkor J																	EM			FG			F-301 (N2000)				F-401s (N4004s)					F50 (N50)							F65 (N65 / U)		F75 (N75 / U2)										
Entry-level						35		35 II		Auto 35																				FG-20			F-401 (N4004)				F-401x (N5005)								F60 (N60)			F55 (N55)											
Entry-level									Zoom 35																																FM10 / FE10																		
Class	55	56	57	58	59	60	61	62	63	64	65	66	67	68	69	70	71	72	73	74	75	76	77	78	79	80	81	82	83	84	85	86	87	88	89	90	91	92	93	94	95	96	97	98	99	00	01	02	03	04	05	06	07	08	09	...	20	21	22
Class	1950s					1960s										1970s										1980s										1990s										2000s										2020s			
