= Nikon Pronea cameras =

Compact camera product line

The Nikon Pronea cameras were two APS system models of film SLR cameras made by Nikon in the mid- to late-1990s. The S was discontinued in 1999, with the 6i following in 2000, both due to the rise of DSLRs.

== Cameras ==
Two camera bodies were produced: the Pronea 6i (U.S. name) / Pronea 600i (international name) and the Pronea S. Both can use special Nikon IX lenses, which are only usable on the Pronea bodies, along with Nikon AF lenses, which are also usable on Nikon F-mount 35mm autofocus SLRs. They used IX240 APS film cartridges.

Nikon Pronea cameras
Camera	Rel date	Mount	Modes	Shutter	Flash sync	Dimensions	Weight (Note: Weight shown is without batteries.)	Battery
Nikon Pronea 6i Nikon Pronea 600i	1996	F	PSAM	30–1/4000 s; B	1/180 s	135×99×74 mm (5.3×3.9×2.9 in)	560 g (20 oz)	2×CR123A
Nikon Pronea S	1998	F	PSA	30–1/2000 s; B	1/125 s	116×87×57 mm (4.6×3.4×2.2 in)	450 g (16 oz)	2×CR2

Notes

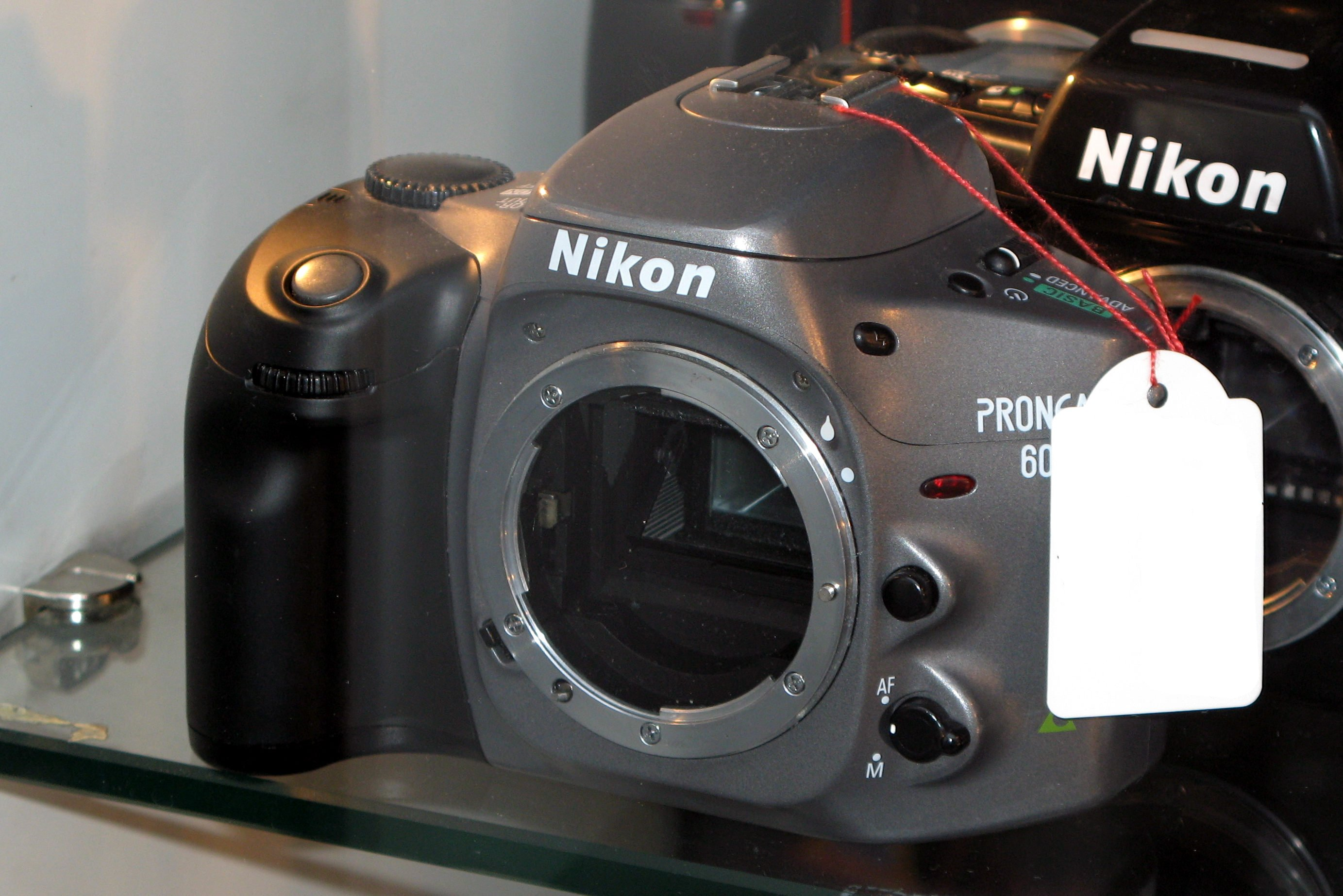
Nikon Pronea 600i

=== Pronea 6i/600i ===
The Nikon Pronea 6i was an autofocus SLR body for Nikon F-mount lenses and IX240 APS film sold in the US. It was also sold as the Nikon Pronea 600i in non-US markets. Kodak made digital variants of it in the 300 series, the Kodak DCS 315 and DCS 330. It was introduced in 1996.

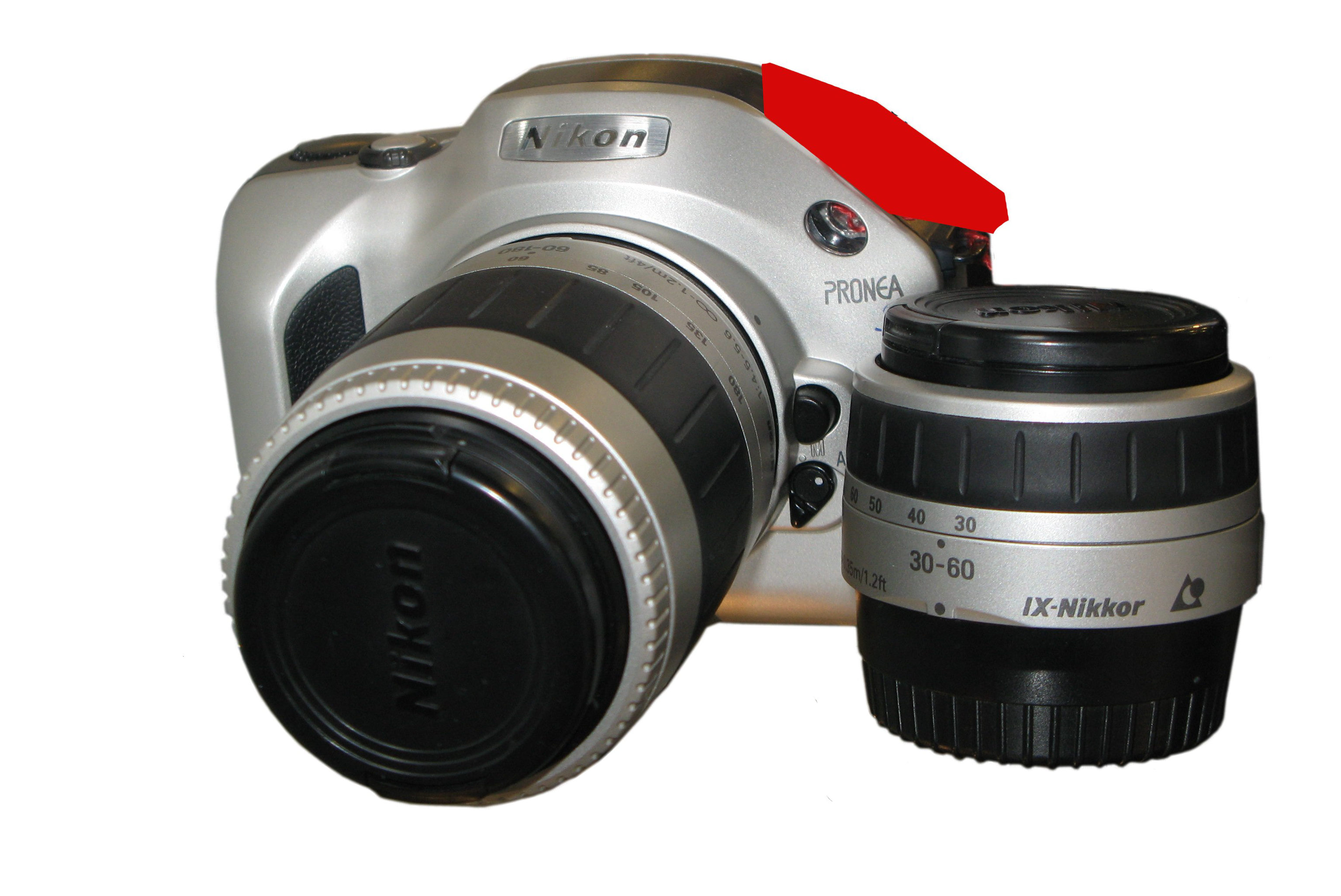
Nikon Pronea S with IX-Nikkor lenses

=== Pronea S ===
The Nikon Pronea S was one of Nikon's light APS film autofocus SLR camera bodies for Nikon AF lenses. It was introduced in 1998. It has a versatile autofocus system including a focus tracking mode. It has two built-in TTL light meters for optimal automatic exposure control with shutter speeds from 30 to 1/2000 seconds. It has a 95% pentaprism finder with diopter adjustment and a built-in electronic flash.

== Lenses ==
The Pronea camera can use two similar lens types: the conventional Nikon F-mount lenses and the IX-Nikkor lenses.

All Nikon AF lenses can be used, as the Pronea camera bodies use the same electrical and mechanical F-mount interface as Nikon's 35mm film cameras.

In addition, new IX-Nikkor zoom lenses were designed and released for the Nikon Pronea line of APS SLRs. Although the IX-Nikkor zooms use the same electrical and mechanical F-mount interface, they were designed to cover the smaller APS-H frame size of 16.7×30.2 mm (0.66×1.19 in) with a shorter backfocus than 35 mm Nikkor lenses, resulting in the rear elements of IX-Nikkor lenses protruding more deeply into the camera body than conventional 35 mm Nikkor lenses. This meant that Pronea cameras could accept conventional Nikkor F-mount lenses, but IX-Nikkor lenses could not be used with non-Pronea Nikon SLRs without locking up the mirror. IX-Nikkor lenses use the same electronic communications as Nikkor AF lenses with distance encoding (AF-D).

== APS film type ==
The Pronea cameras used the new (at the time) IX240 Advanced Photo System (APS) film cartridges, initially developed by Kodak, with cameras produced by a consortium of Canon, Fujifilm, Kodak, Minolta, and Nikon. APS used a closed film cartridge to reduce loading errors. APS also could reduce camera and lens size and weight by using a smaller image format, which had a 1.25 crop factor compared to 35mm film.

== See also ==
- Advanced Photo System
- Nikon Nuvis, a compact APS camera line

Class	1950s			1960s										1970s										1980s										1990s										2000s										2020s			
Class	57	58	59	60	61	62	63	64	65	66	67	68	69	70	71	72	73	74	75	76	77	78	79	80	81	82	83	84	85	86	87	88	89	90	91	92	93	94	95	96	97	98	99	00	01	02	03	04	05	06	07	08	09	...	20	21	22
Profes- sional			F																					F3																																	
Profes- sional															F2												F3AF					F4								F5								F6									
High- end																											FA					F-801 (N8008)/ F-801s (N8008s)				F90 (N90)		F90X (N90s)					F100														
Mid- range																														F-501 (N2020)				F-601 (N6006)				F70 (N70)						F80 (N80)													
Mid- range																EL / EL2 /ELW						FE					FE2							F-601M (N6000)				F70 (N70)						F80 (N80)													
Mid- range									FT		FTn/ FT2/ FT3										FM					FM2/FM2n																			FM3A												
Mid- range									FS												FM					FM2/FM2n																			FM3A												
Entry- level																																																									
Entry- level																																								Pronea 600i/6i																	
Entry- level																																										Pronea S															
Entry- level						Nikkorex F / Nikkor J																	EM			FG			F-301 (N2000)				F-401s (N4004s)					F50 (N50)							F65 (N65 / U)		F75 (N75 / U2)										
Entry- level				35		35 II		Auto 35																				FG-20			F-401 (N4004)				F-401x (N5005)								F60 (N60)			F55 (N55)											
Entry- level							Zoom 35																																FM10 / FE10																		
Class	57	58	59	60	61	62	63	64	65	66	67	68	69	70	71	72	73	74	75	76	77	78	79	80	81	82	83	84	85	86	87	88	89	90	91	92	93	94	95	96	97	98	99	00	01	02	03	04	05	06	07	08	09	...	20	21	22
Class	1950s			1960s										1970s										1980s										1990s										2000s										2020s			
