= Canon EOS D6000 =

1998 APS-H digital single-lens reflex camera

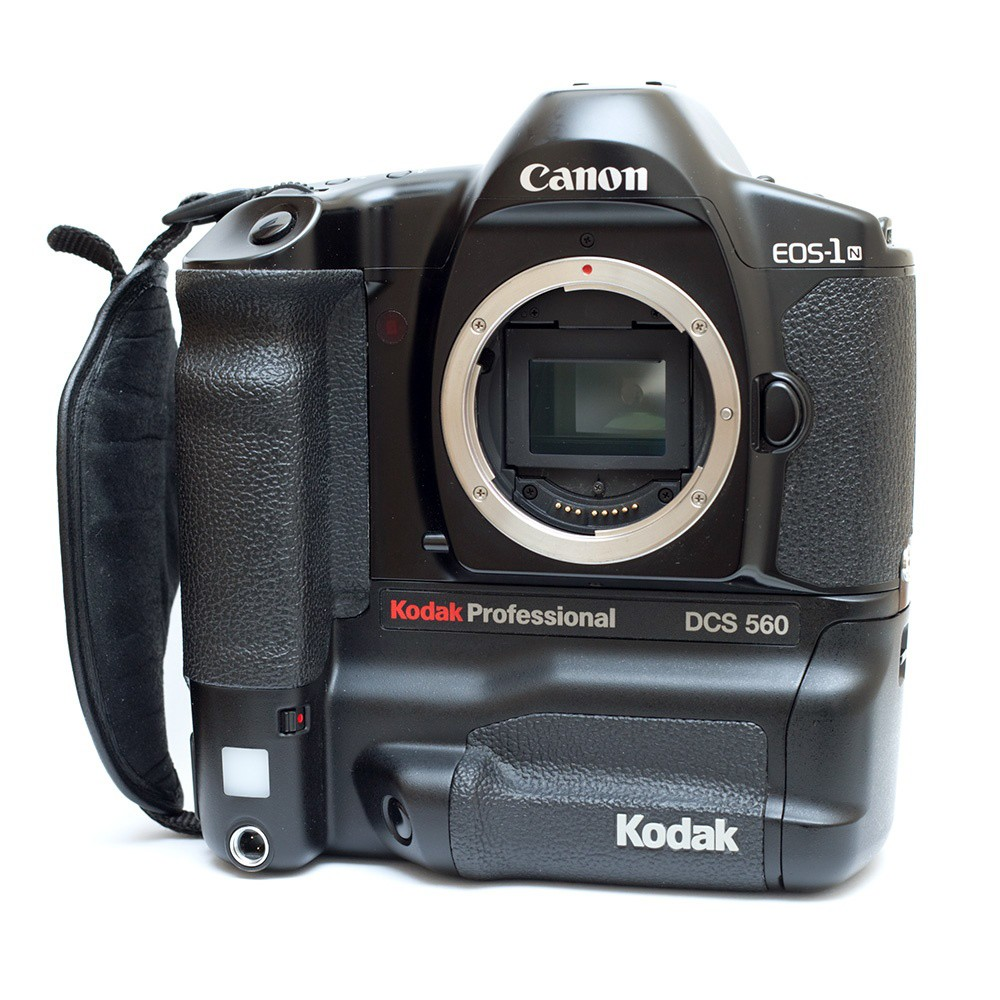

Overview
- Maker: Canon Inc.
- Type: Single-lens reflex with Digital back

Lens
- Lens: Interchangeable (EF)

Sensor/medium
- Sensor: CCD, 1.3x crop factor (APS-H)
- Maximum resolution: 3,040 x 2,008 (6.1 megapixels)
- Storage media: PCMCIA card slot

Focusing
- Focus areas: 5 points
- Focus bracketing: none

Exposure/metering
- Exposure metering: TTL, full aperture, zones

Flash
- Flash: Canon hotshoe
- Flash bracketing: none

Shutter
- Shutter: electronic focal plane
- Shutter speed range: 30 to 1/8000 s

Viewfinder
- Viewfinder: Optical

Image processing
- White balance: 5 presets, including Auto and custom
- WB bracketing: none

General
- LCD screen: none
- Battery: External
- Optional battery packs: none.
- Weight: 1,650 g (58 oz) (body only)

The Canon EOS D6000 was Kodak's Canon-based digital SLR camera (a rebranded Kodak DCS 560) that was released in 1998.

== See also ==
- Kodak DCS

Type	Sensor	Class	00	01	02	03	04	05	06	07	08	09	10	11	12	13	14	15	16	17	18	19	20	21	22	23	24	25	26
DSLR	Full-frame	Flagship				1Ds		1Ds Mk II			1Ds Mk III					1D C													
DSLR	Full-frame	Flagship				1Ds		1Ds Mk II			1Ds Mk III				1D X					1D X Mk II ^{T}			1D X Mk III ^{T}						
DSLR	APS-H	Flagship			1D			1D Mk II	1D Mk II N		1D Mk III		1D Mk IV																
DSLR	Full-frame	Professional																	5DS / 5DS R										
DSLR	Full-frame	Professional							5D			_{x} 5D Mk II			_{x} 5D Mk III					5D Mk IV ^{T}									
DSLR	Full-frame	Advanced														_{x} 6D					_{x} 6D Mk II ^{AT}								
DSLR	APS-C	Advanced											_{x} 7D					_{x} 7D Mk II											
DSLR	APS-C	Mid-range						20Da								_{x} 60Da ^{A}													
DSLR	APS-C	Mid-range		D30	D60	10D		20D	30D		40D	_{x} 50D		_{x} 60D ^{A}			_{x} 70D ^{AT}		80D ^{AT}				90D ^{AT}						
DSLR	APS-C	Mid-range																	760D ^{AT}		77D ^{AT}								
DSLR	APS-C	Entry-level					300D	350D		400D	450D	_{x} 500D	_{x} 550D	_{x} 600D ^{A}		_{x} 650D ^{AT}	_{x} 700D ^{AT}		_{x} 750D ^{AT}		800D ^{AT}			850D ^{AT}					
DSLR	APS-C	Entry-level															_{x} 100D ^{T}		_{x} 200D ^{AT}				250D ^{AT}						
DSLR	APS-C	Entry-level										1000D		_{x} 1100D			_{x} 1200D			1300D		2000D							
DSLR	APS-C	Value																				4000D							
Early models			Canon EOS DCS 5 (1995); Canon EOS DCS 3 (1995); Canon EOS DCS 1 (1995); Canon EOS D2000 (1998); Canon EOS D6000 (1998)																										
Type	Sensor	Spec																											
Type	Sensor	Spec	00	01	02	03	04	05	06	07	08	09	10	11	12	13	14	15	16	17	18	19	20	21	22	23	24	25	26
