= Canon EOS-1 (camera series) =

Series of 35mm and digital SLR cameras

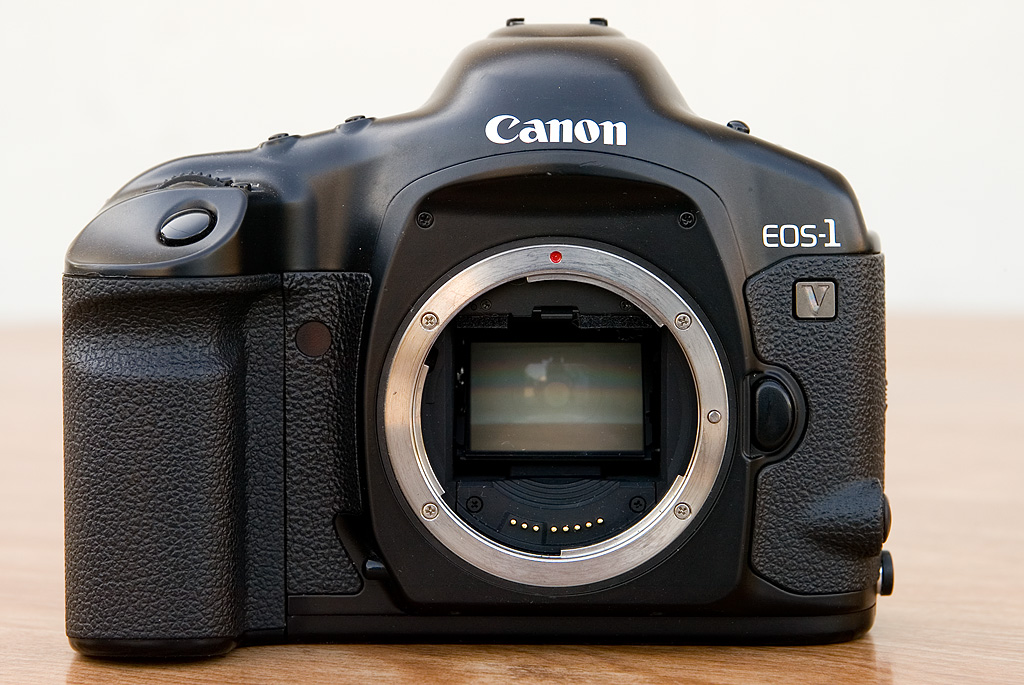
The Canon EOS-1V, released in 2000.

Canon EOS-1 is a series of professional-grade system cameras produced by Canon as part of the EOS brand. In 1989, Canon released a single lens reflex camera, the EOS-1. It utilized new technologies not found in the earlier EOS-650 in a professional level body. Its characteristics are still found today in more recent versions of its series. Numerous accessories were also available to improve performance and battery life.

== Film cameras ==
=== EOS-1N ===
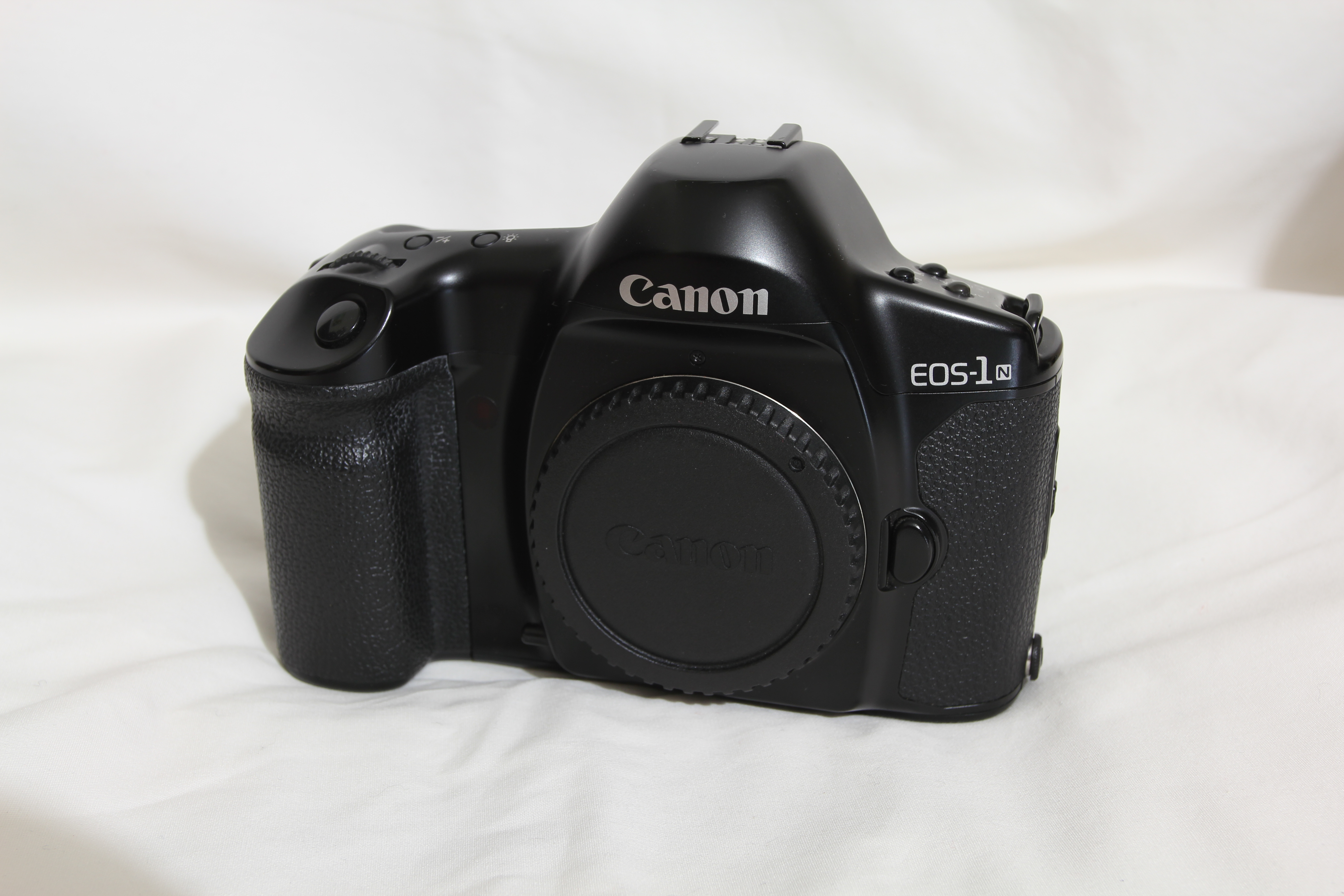
Canon EOS-1N camera

In November 1994, Canon released the EOS-1N. It is a 35mm focal-plane shutter single lens reflex camera. This model introduced a new autofocus configuration with five focusing points. Each can detect contrast both vertically and horizontally either automatically or manually rather than one point that was provided by the Canon EOS-1.

=== EOS-1V ===
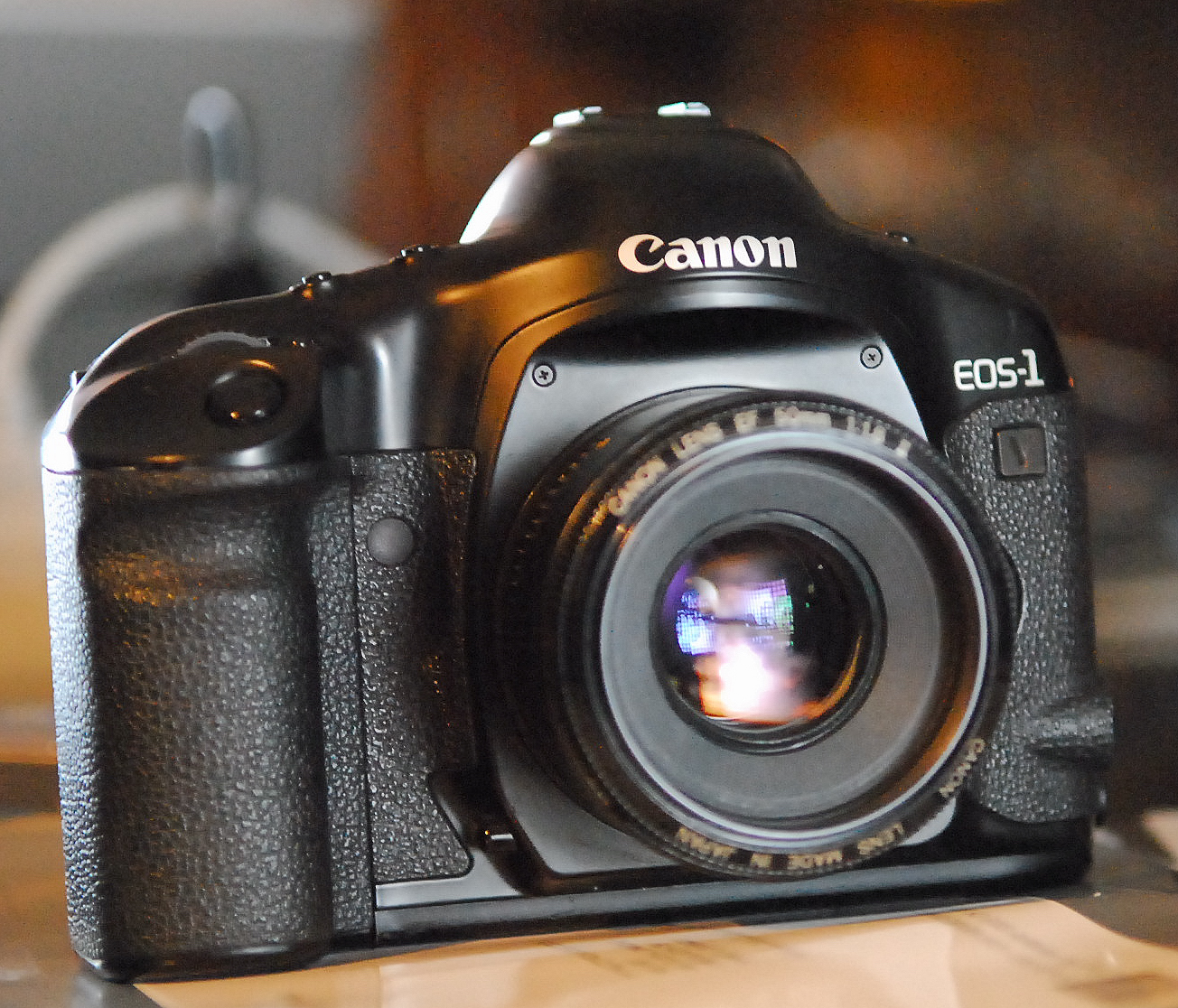
Canon EOS-1V

Six years later, Canon released the EOS-1V, which took upon a new design and enhanced features of previous EOS-1 series cameras. It featured a 45 point autofocus, new AF-assist points that could detect movement of subjects throughout the frame, and automatically change between AF points. The EOS-1V was the first EOS-1 series camera to use the E-TTL flash metering system.

== Digital cameras ==
=== EOS-1D and EOS-1Ds ===
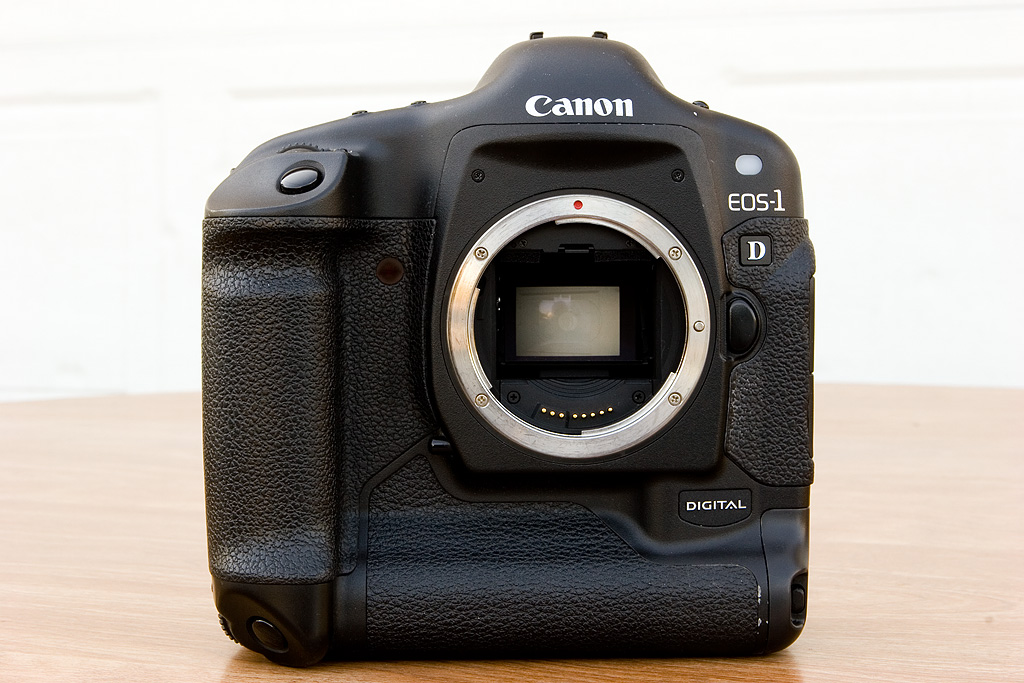
Canon EOS-1D

Following the EOS-1V, in 2001 Canon released the EOS-1D, the first digital EOS-1 camera body. The EOS-1D featured a 4.1-megapixel APS-H sized CCD sensor, rather than a roll of 35 mm film. It was also different in form, as it was Canon's first in-house professional camera. Canon later released the EOS-1Ds, a variant of the EOS-1D with a larger and higher-resolution 11-megapixel full-frame equivalent CMOS sensor. Additionally, these cameras are equipped with two autofocus modes and an additional ability of manual focus.

=== EOS-1D Mark II, EOS-1Ds Mark II, and EOS-1D Mark II N ===
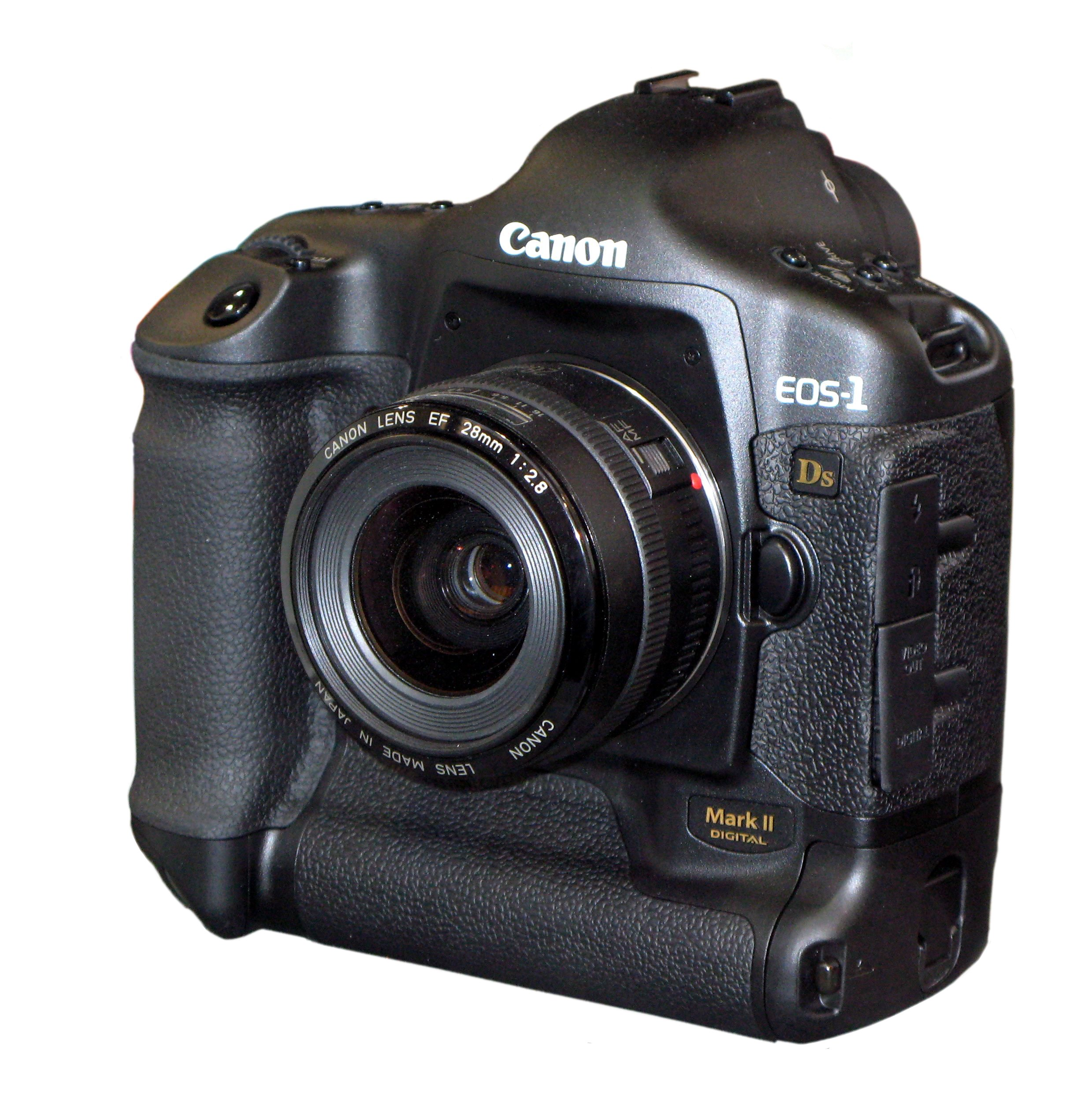
EOS-1Ds

Canon later released both the EOS-1D Mark II and EOS-1Ds Mark II revisions of the EOS-1D and EOS-1Ds respectively. Compared to their predecessors, both had higher resolution CMOS sensors, wireless capability (with an external transmitter), and an additional card slot. Later Canon also released the EOS-1D Mark II N, which offered additional improvements: a slightly larger screen, a marginally faster burst rate, and an improved version of E-TTL flash metering system, known as E-TTL II.

=== EOS-1D Mark III and EOS-1Ds Mark III ===
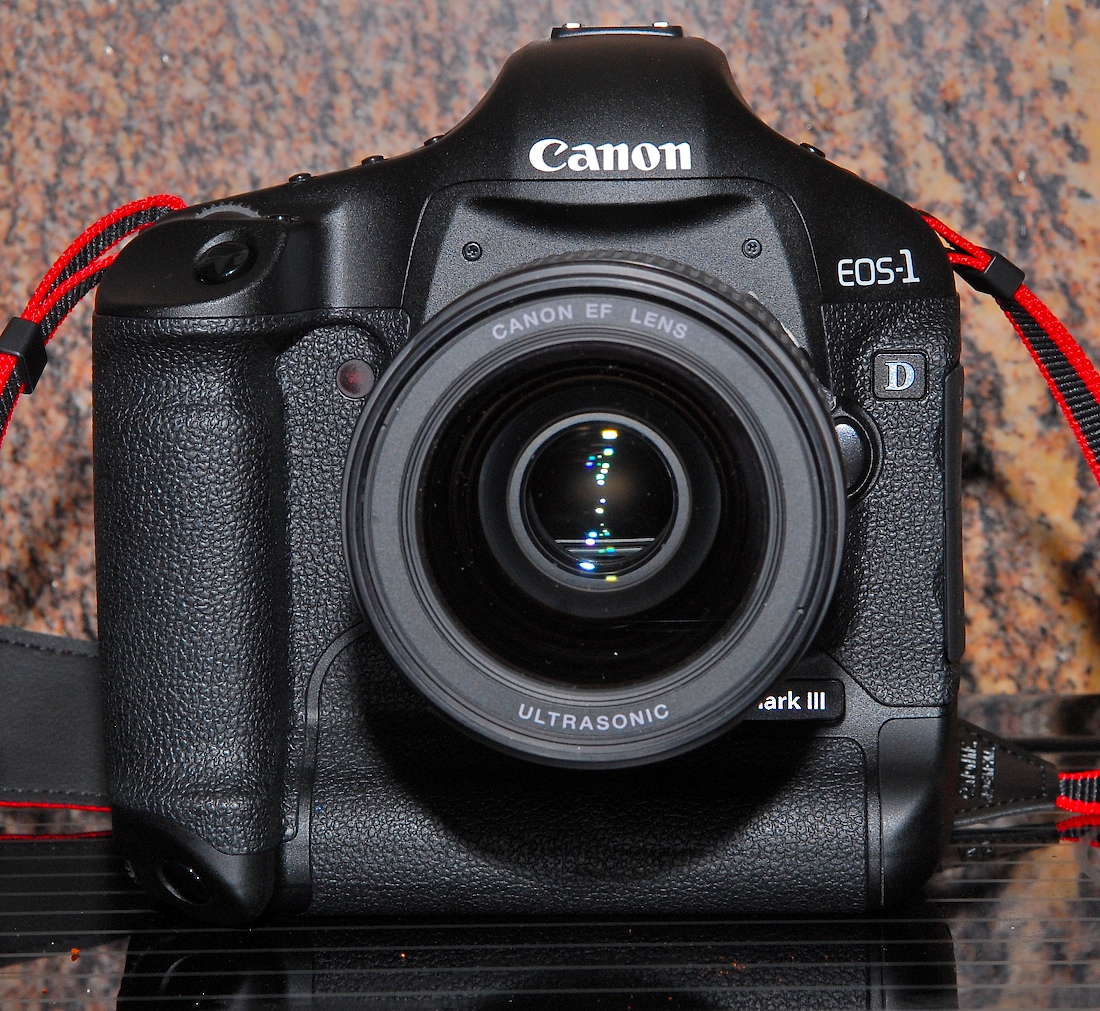
EOS-1D Mark III Front View

In 2007, Canon released the next iterations of the EOS-1D and EOS-1Ds, the EOS-1D Mark III and EOS-1Ds Mark III. When it was released, it held the title of the highest resolution full frame (35mm) dSLR, with a 21 megapixel CMOS sensor. Both cameras offered a new, much larger and higher resolution LCD monitor, Ethernet compatibility, and a new autofocus system. The EOS-1D featured improved burst shooting capabilities, while the new 1Ds had a higher resolution 21-megapixel sensor. The primary new feature of both cameras was the addition of a live view system. Using Live view, users could see a live preview of the composition, exposure, focus, and the image itself from the 3-inch LCD. The EOS-1Ds line was discontinued in mid-2012 with the introduction of the EOS-1D X, a full-frame body which merged the previous EOS-1D line of high-speed professional bodies with the EOS-1Ds line.

=== EOS-1D Mark IV ===
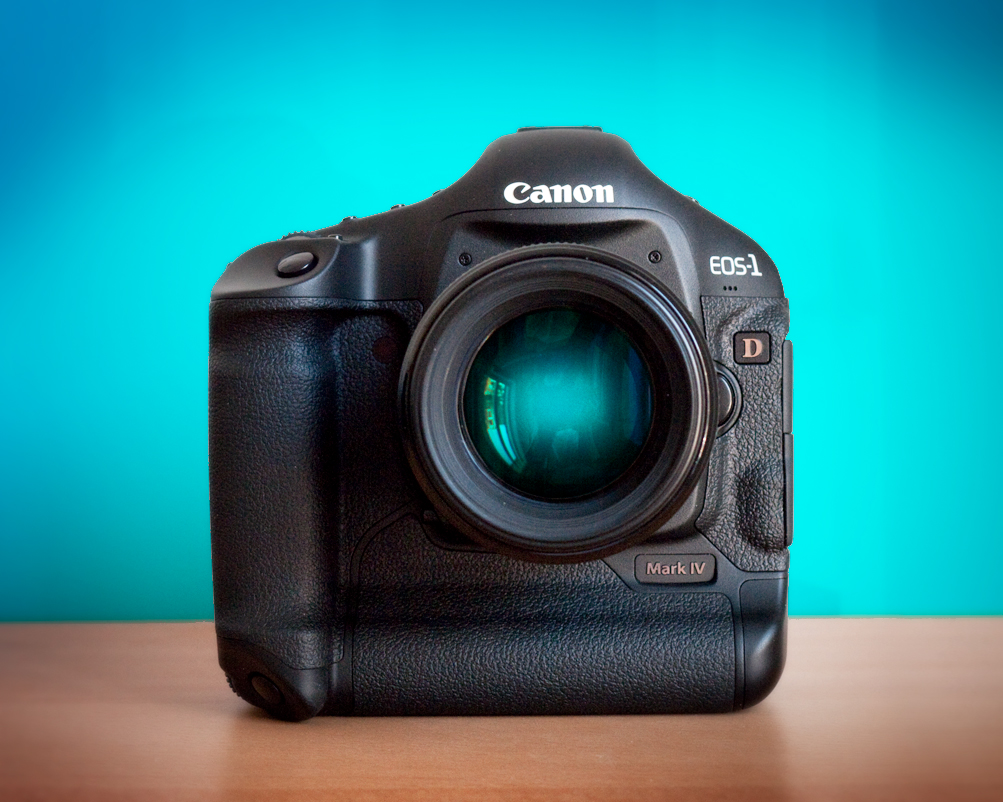
Canon EOS-1D Mark IV

In October 2009, Canon introduced the EOS-1D Mark IV, succeeding the Canon EOS-1D Mark III. This camera featured two major additions: all the 39 cross-type AF points were now user-selectable, and the camera now featured a video recording mode. Additionally, the camera's maximum film speed had been improved to ISO 12800. The EOS-1D Mark IV was the final APS-H camera in the EOS-1 series. The EOS-1Ds did not receive a Mark IV revision, as Canon planned to replace it with a redeveloped full-frame camera.

=== EOS-1D X and EOS-1D C ===
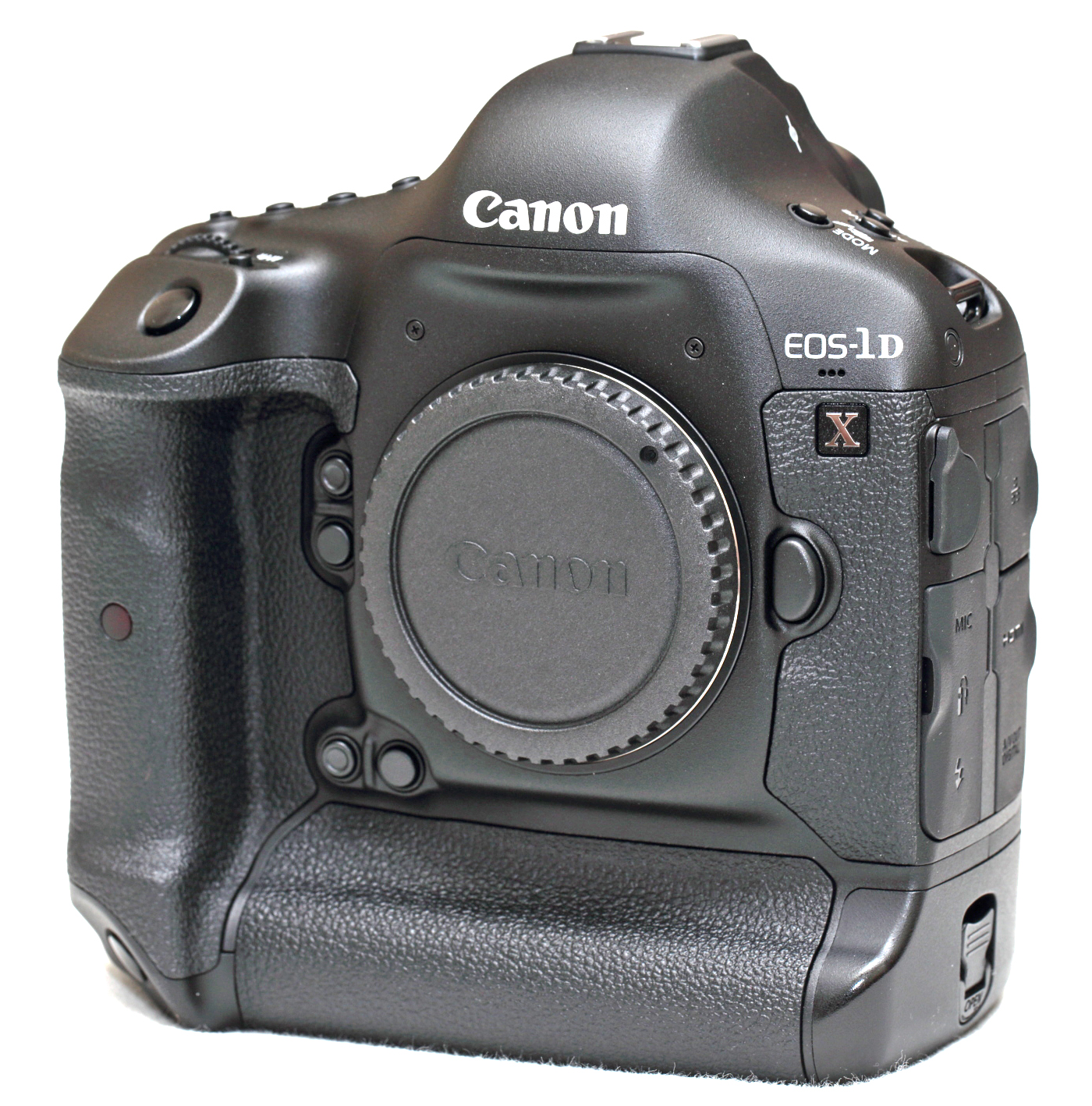
Canon EOS-1D X body

In 2012, Canon merged the EOS-1D and EOS-1Ds lines into one with the EOS-1D X, which featured the sensor size of the EOS-1Ds Mark III combined with the fast burst shooting speed of the EOS-1D Mark IV. Canon also released the EOS-1D C, a cinema orientated camera that offered 4K video with a 10bit 4:2:2 color space and Canon Log capabilities, but it never sold well due to its high price point & form factor that was not suited for professional video use.

=== EOS-1D X Mark II ===
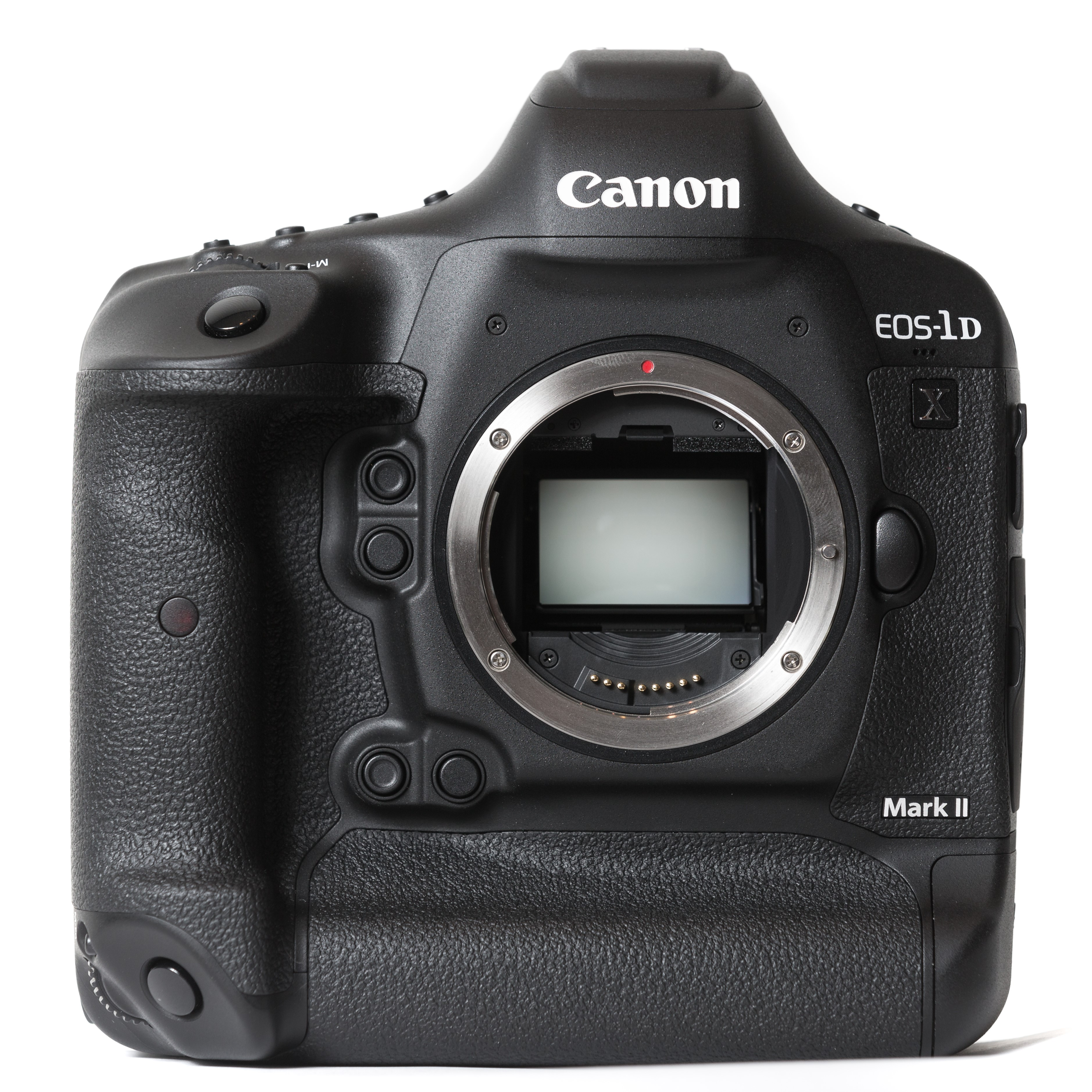
Canon EOS-1D X Mark II

In 2016, Canon released the EOS-1D X Mark II to succeed the EOS-1D X. The camera featured a significantly larger burst shooting buffer capable of storing 170 RAW images in a row (when using 'CFast' 2.0 cards) and unlimited fine JPEGs. It also featured a new autofocus system—Dual-Pixel CMOS AF—and 4K60 DCI recording.

=== EOS-1D X Mark III ===
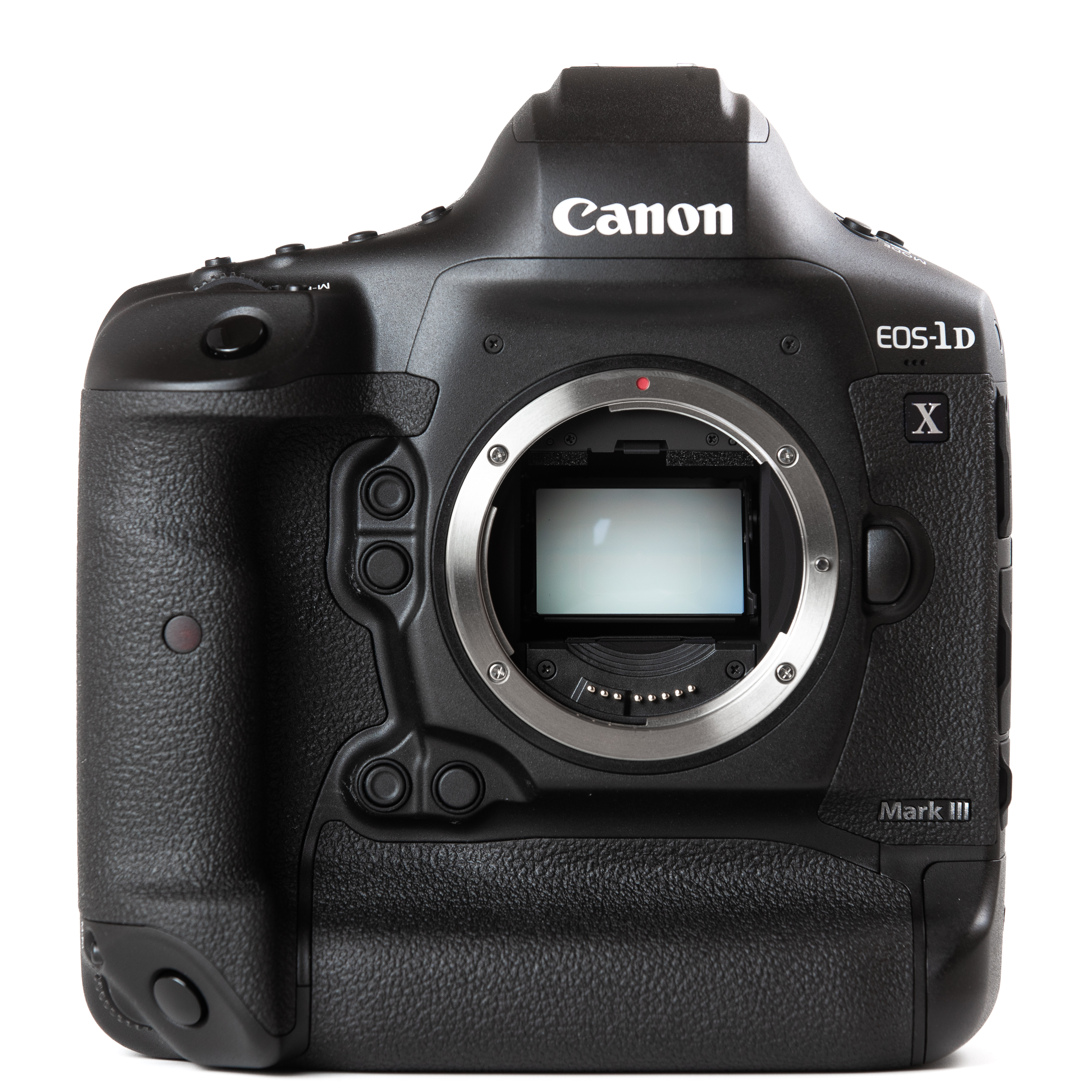
Canon EOS-1D X Mark III

In early 2020, Canon released their final digital single-lens reflex camera in the EOS-1 series, the EOS-1D X Mark III. This camera offered an all new autofocus system, HEIF image recording, 5.5K RAW video, and improved burst capabilities.

=== EOS-R1 ===
In mid 2024, Canon released the EOS-R1, the first mirrorless camera in the EOS-1 lineup. This camera featured a new 24.2 megapixel back-illuminated CMOS sensor, autofocus tracking, an electronic shutter mode with bursts capable of reaching 40 frames per second, and 14bit raw files, as well as 6K RAW video.
