= DS1 =

DS1 or DS-1 may refer to:

- BOSS DS-1, a guitar distortion pedal
- Digital Signal 1, a T-carrier signaling scheme devised by Bell Labs
- Deep Space 1, a mission to 9969 Braille & 19P/Borrelly
- DS-1 (drug), a selective GABA_{A} α4β3δ agonist drug
- South African Class DS1, a diesel locomotive class
- Datsun DS-1, a car by Nissan, see Datsun DS Series
- Dark Souls, an action role-playing game
- Dead Space (2008 video game), a survival horror game
- VR Class Ds1, a Finnish railbus class
- DS-1 Orbital Battle Station, the full name of the original Death Star space station in the Star Wars franchise

== See also ==
- DS (disambiguation)
- Canon EOS-1Ds series
