= Canon EOS-1V =

2000 35mm single-lens reflex camera

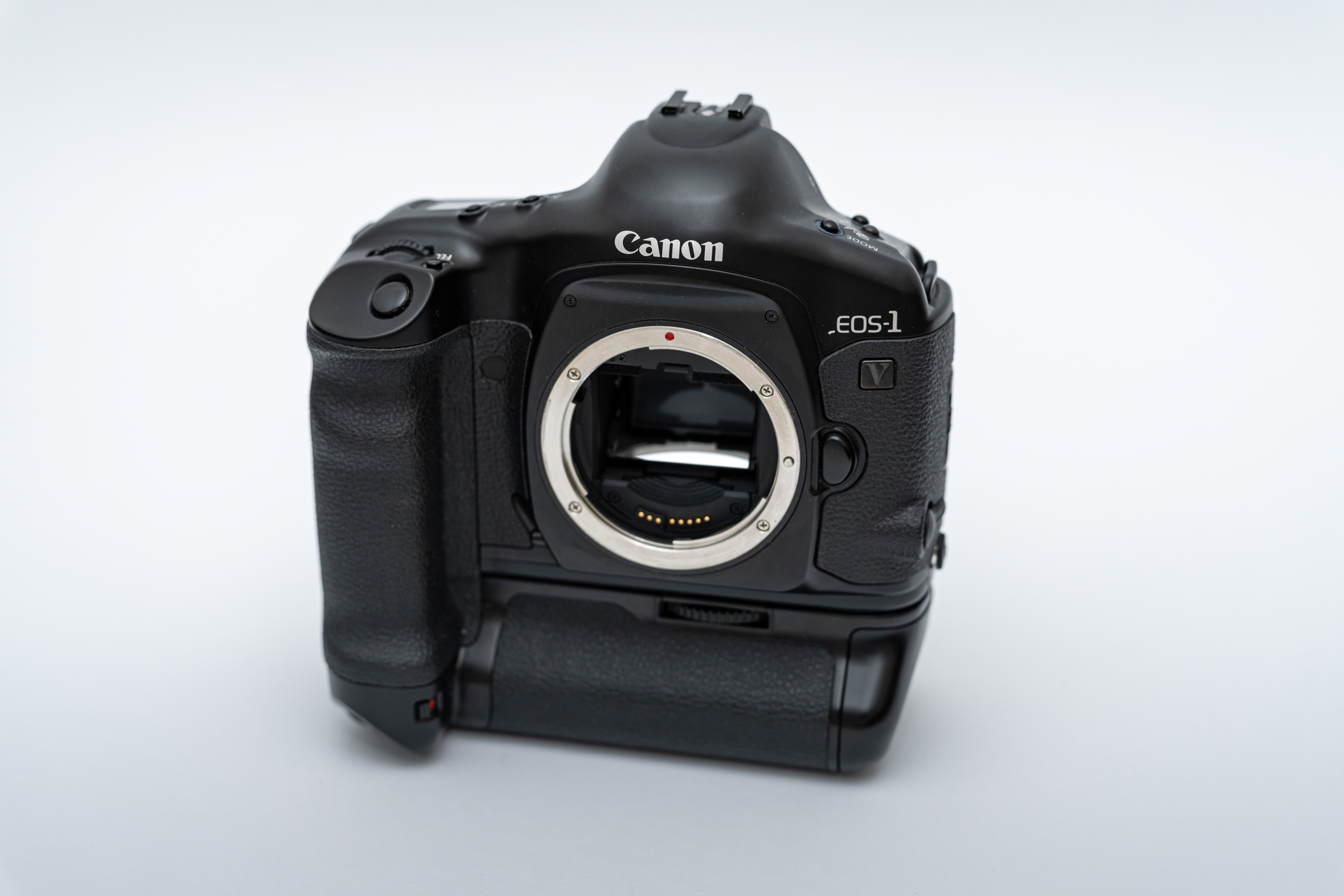
- Canon EOS-1V

Overview
- Maker: Canon Inc.
- Type: Single-lens reflex
- Production: March 2000–May 2018; 18 years 2 months
- Intro price: 270,000¥

Lens
- Lens mount: Canon EF
- Lens: Interchangeable

Sensor/medium
- Film format: 135 film
- Film size: 36×24 mm
- Film speed: ISO 6–6400
- Film speed detection: Yes (ISO 25–5000)

Focusing
- Focus: TTL Phase Detection Autofocus (45 zone)

Exposure/metering
- Exposure: TTL max. aperture metering with 21-zone Evaluative metering Partial metering Centre spot metering Focusing point-linked spot metering Multi-spot metering

Flash
- Flash: None

Shutter
- Frame rate: 4 frame/s, 10 frame/s with PB-E2
- Shutter: Electronically controlled focal-plane shutter
- Shutter speed range: 30s – 1/8000s

Viewfinder
- Viewfinder: Fixed eye-level pentaprism
- Viewfinder magnification: 0.72×
- Frame coverage: 100%

General
- Battery: 2CR5
- Dimensions: 161×120.8×70.8 mm (6.34×4.76×2.79 in)
- Weight: 945 g (33.3 oz) (body only)
- Made in: Japan

Chronology
- Replaced: Canon EOS-1N
- Successor: Canon EOS-1D, Canon EOS-1Ds

The Canon EOS-1V is a professional 35mm single-lens reflex camera from Canon's EOS series, released in 2000. The body design formed the basis for Canon's subsequent Canon EOS-1D and EOS-1Ds families of digital SLRs. The 1V was the last model of Canon professional film cameras before it was discontinued on May 30, 2018.

Canon used the suffix 'V' because the camera introduced the fifth generation of Canon professional SLRs, after the Canon F-1 and New F-1, the Canon T90, and earlier EOS 1 models; Canon also stated that the 'V' stands for "vision".

The EOS 1V was the fastest moving-mirror film camera ever put into production at the time it was introduced, at 10 frames/second with the PB-E2 power drive booster and the NP-E2 Ni-MH battery pack. (Although the 1nRS has a higher frame rate, it used a fixed pellicle mirror rather than a moving mirror).

== Gallery ==
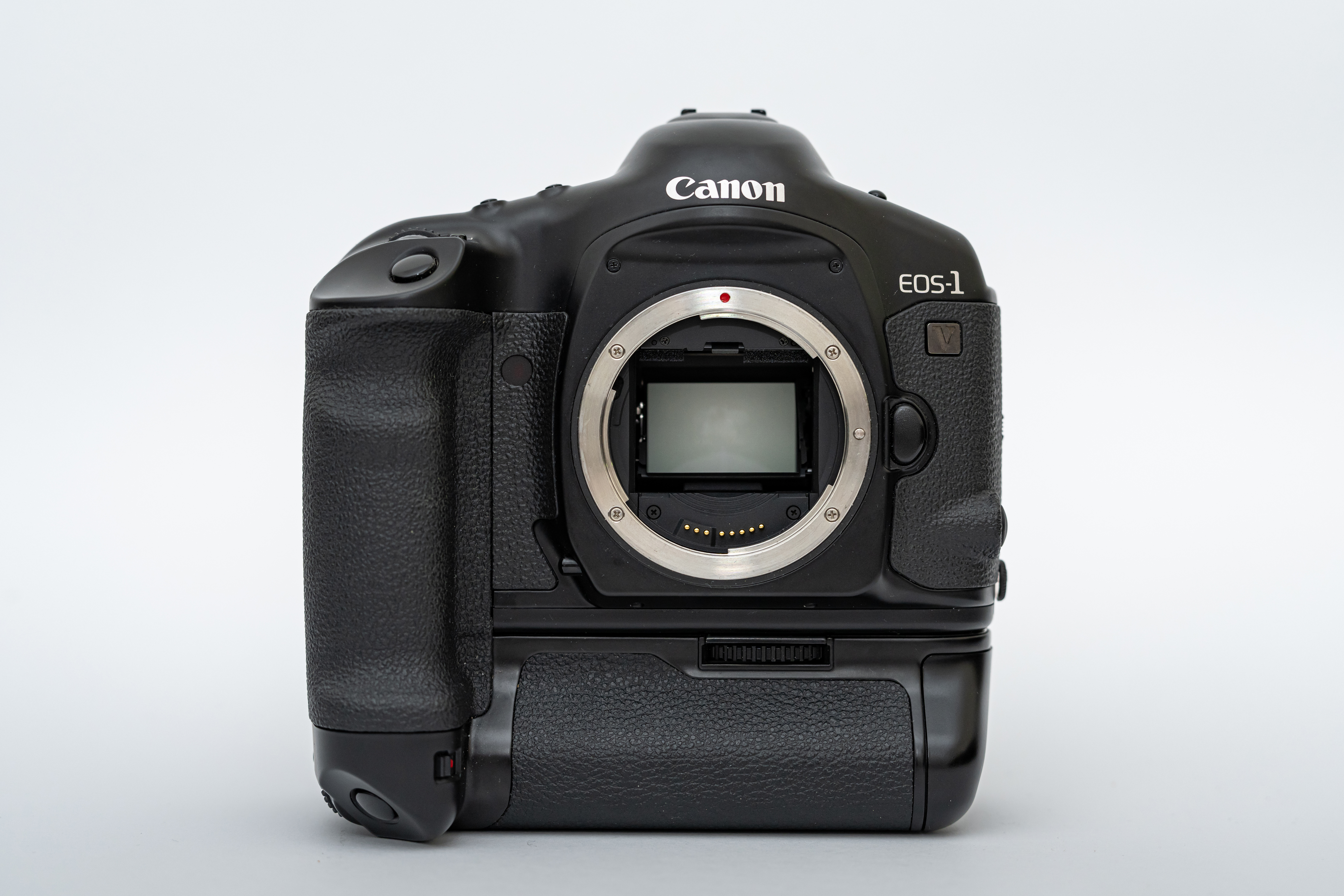

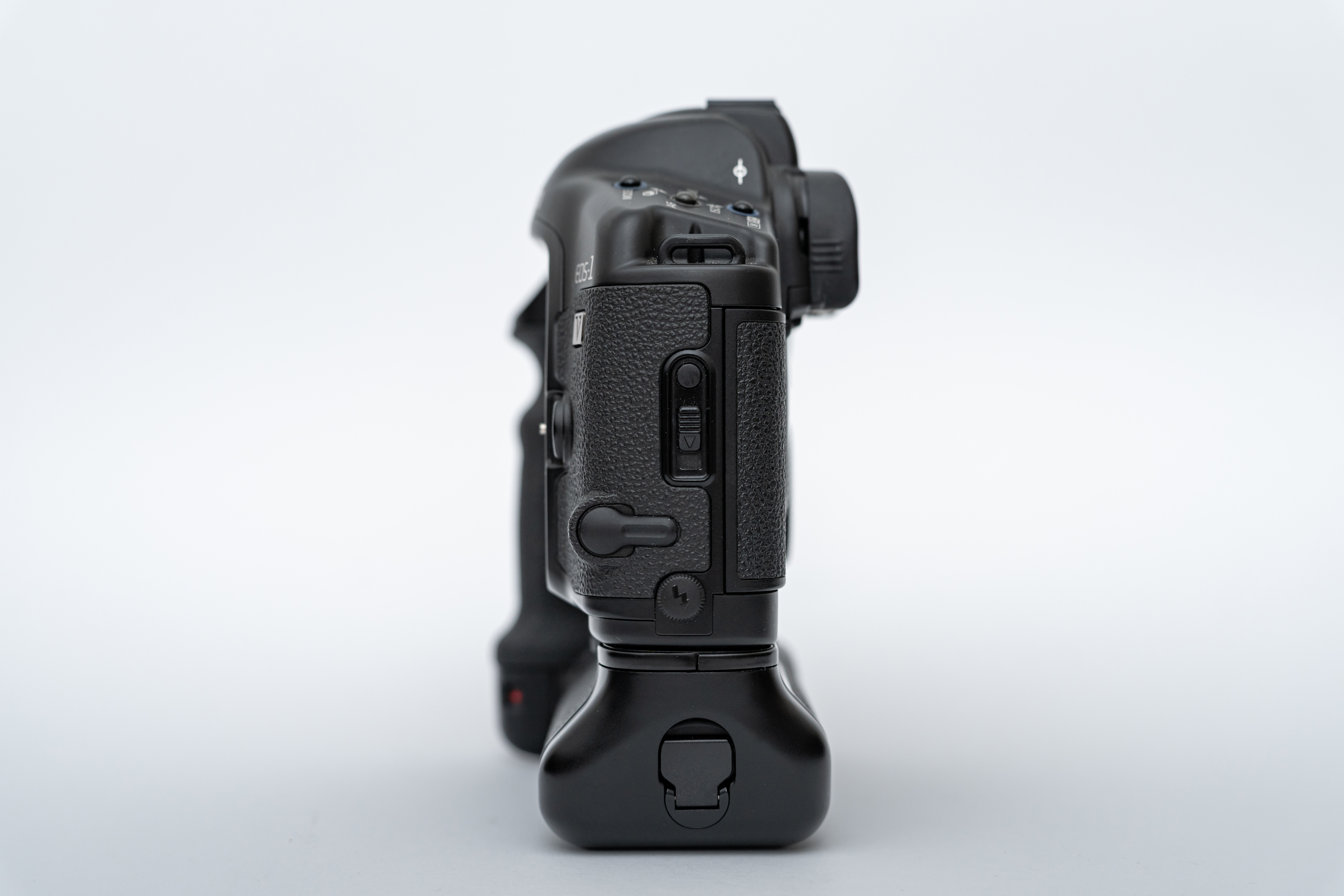

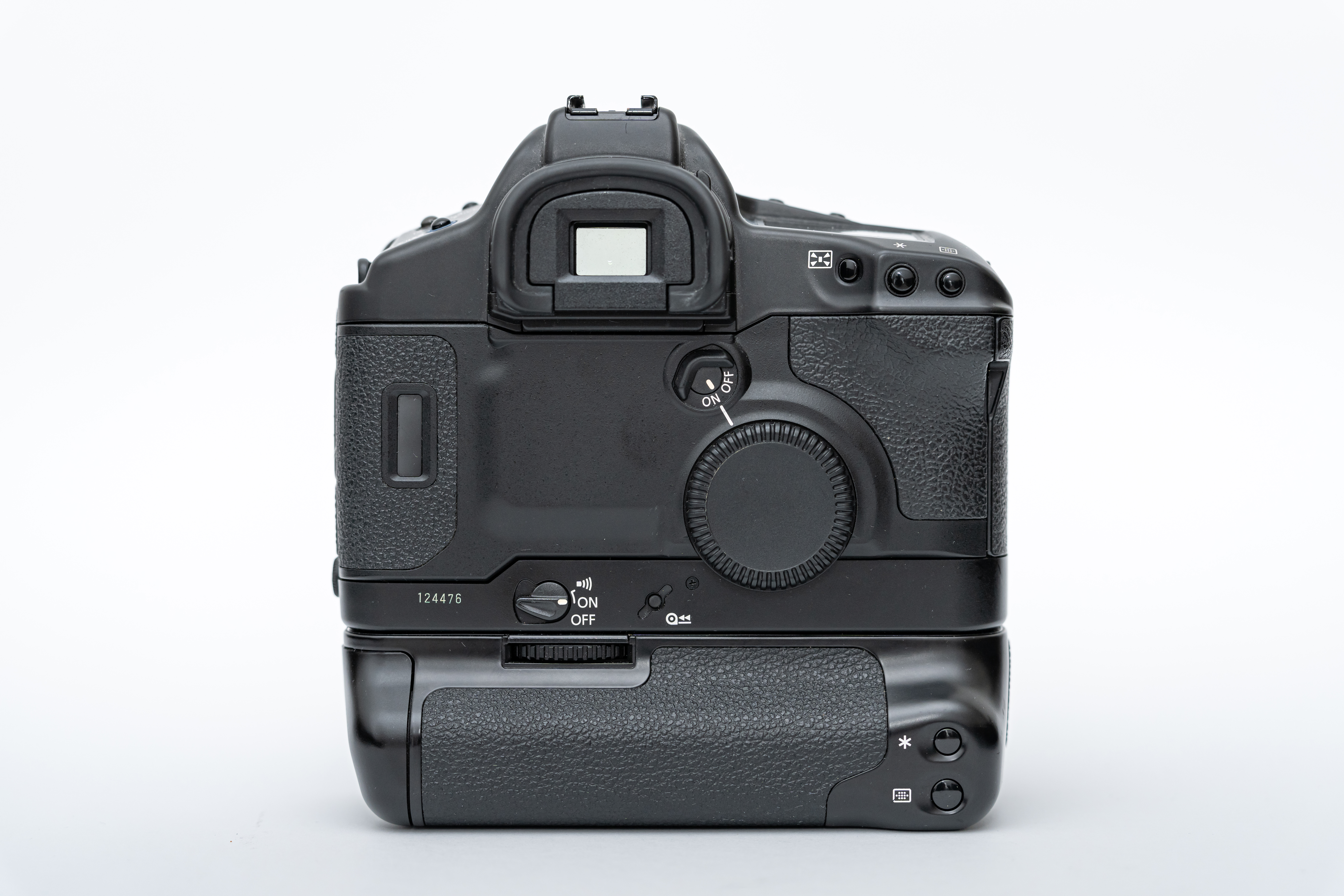

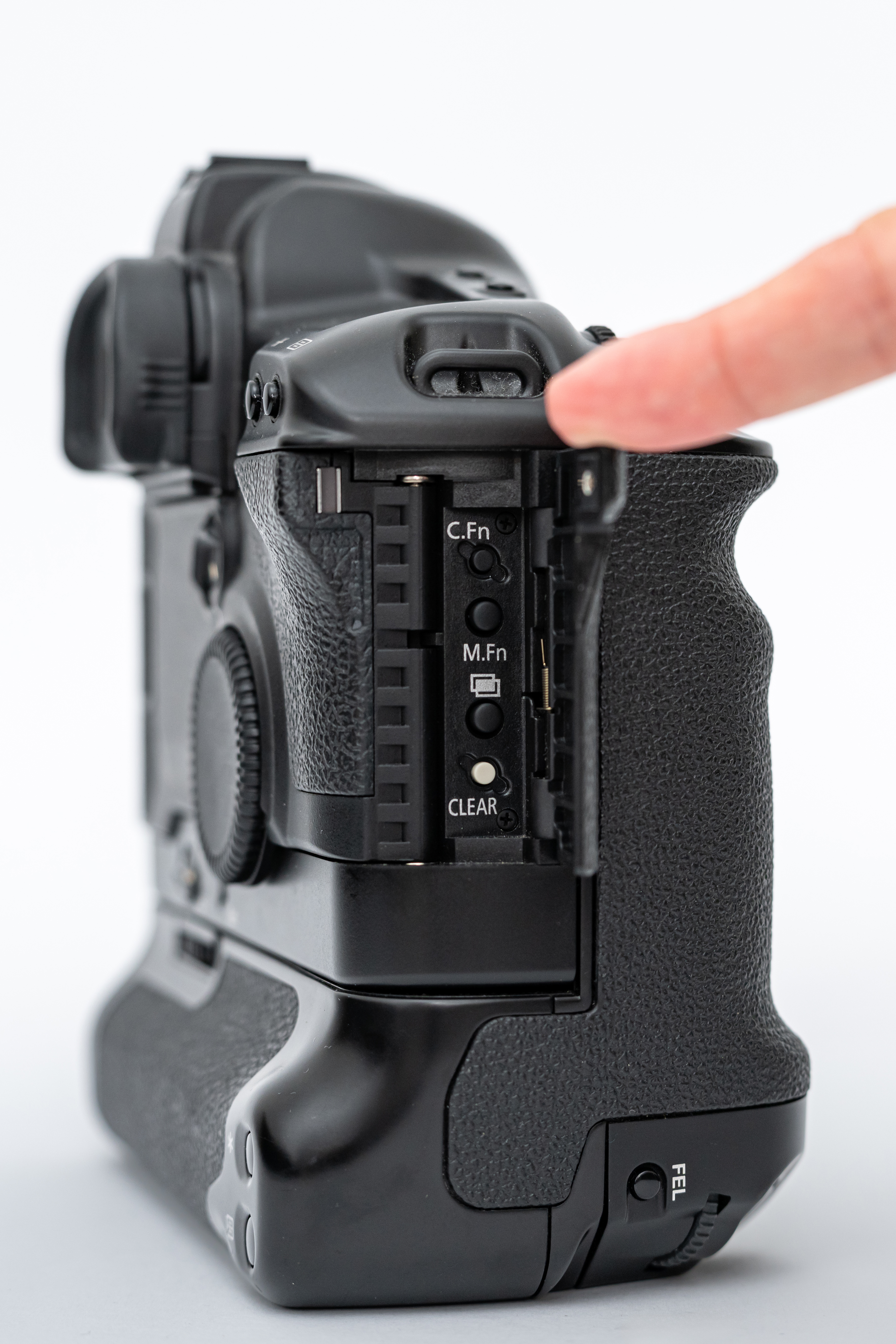

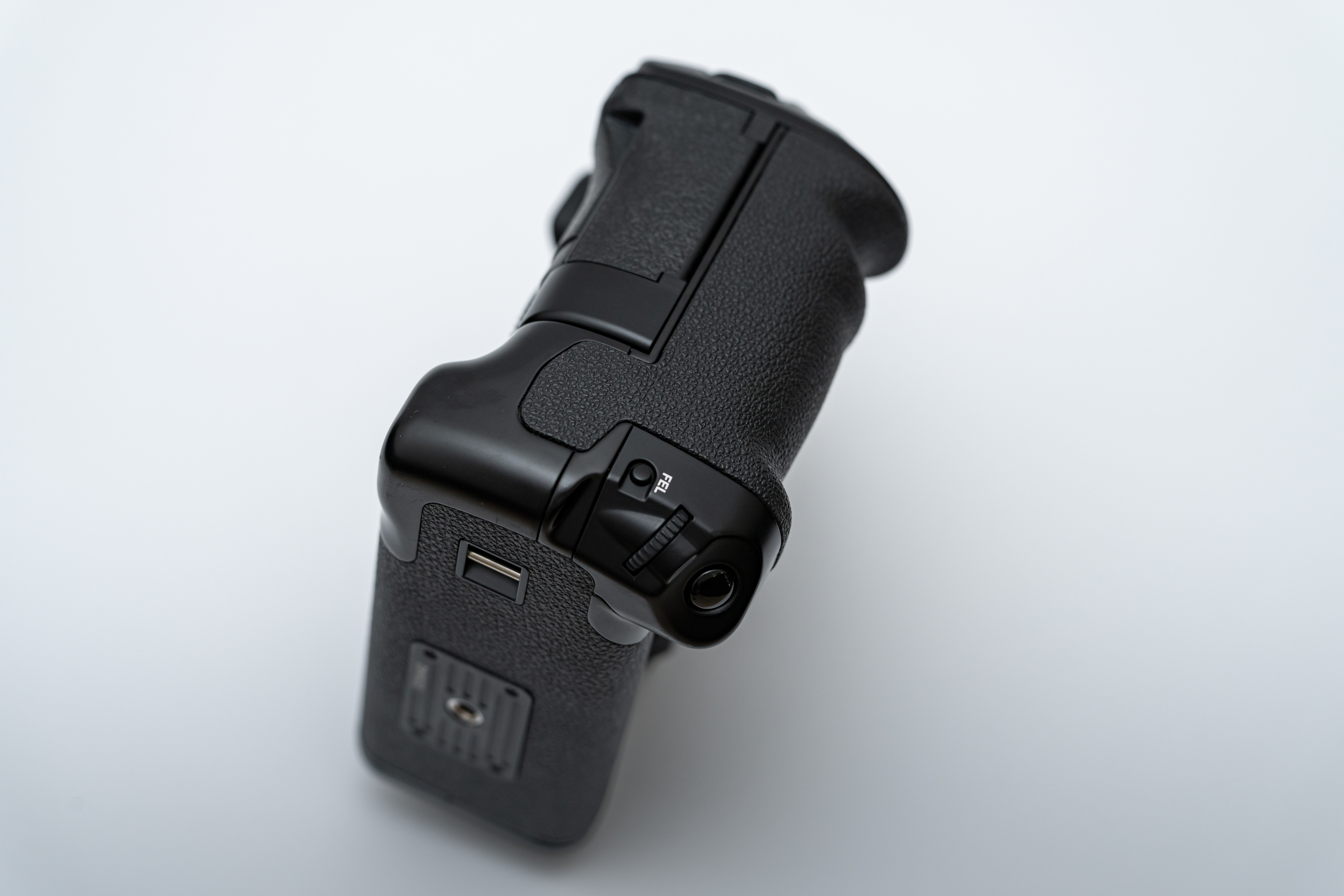

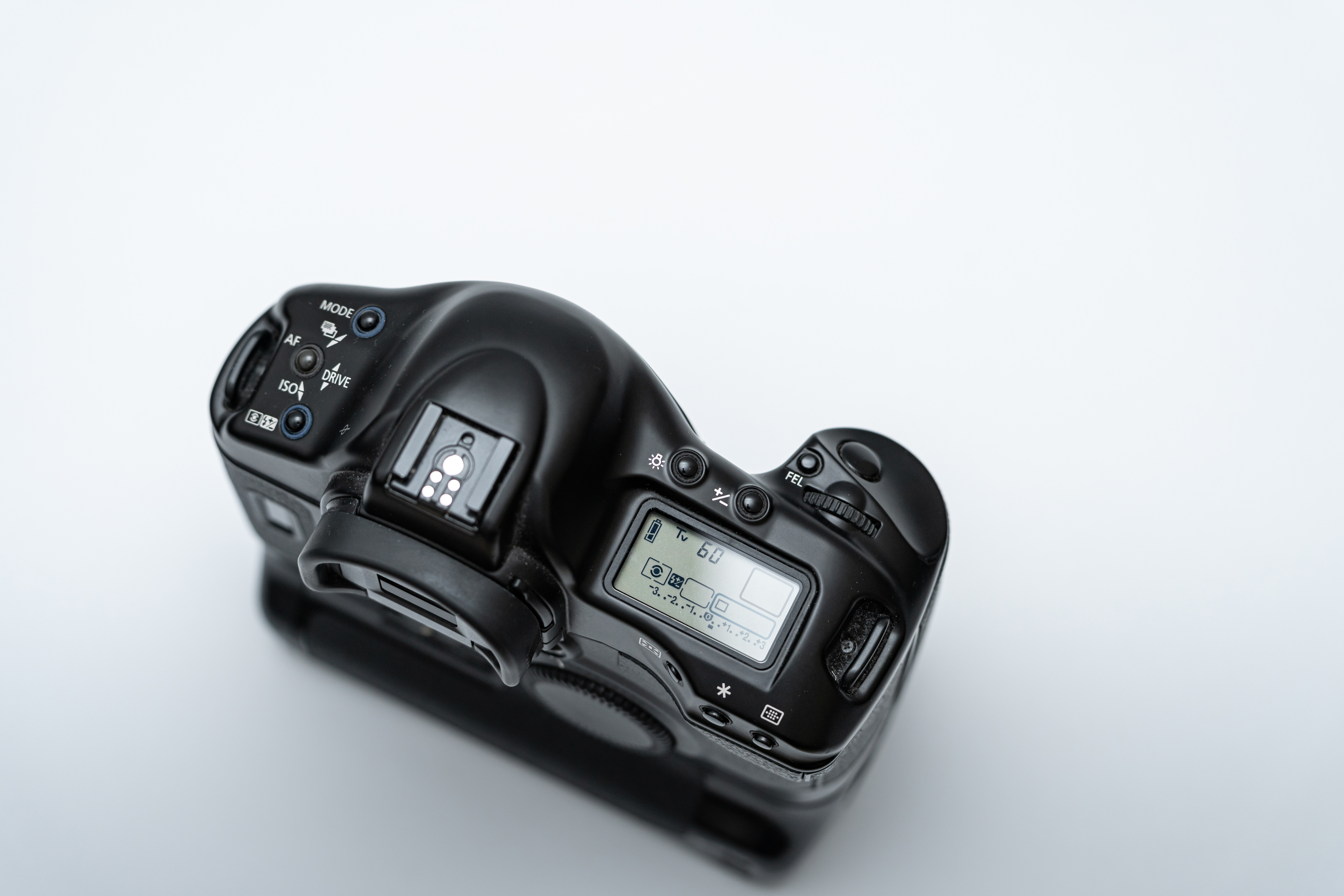

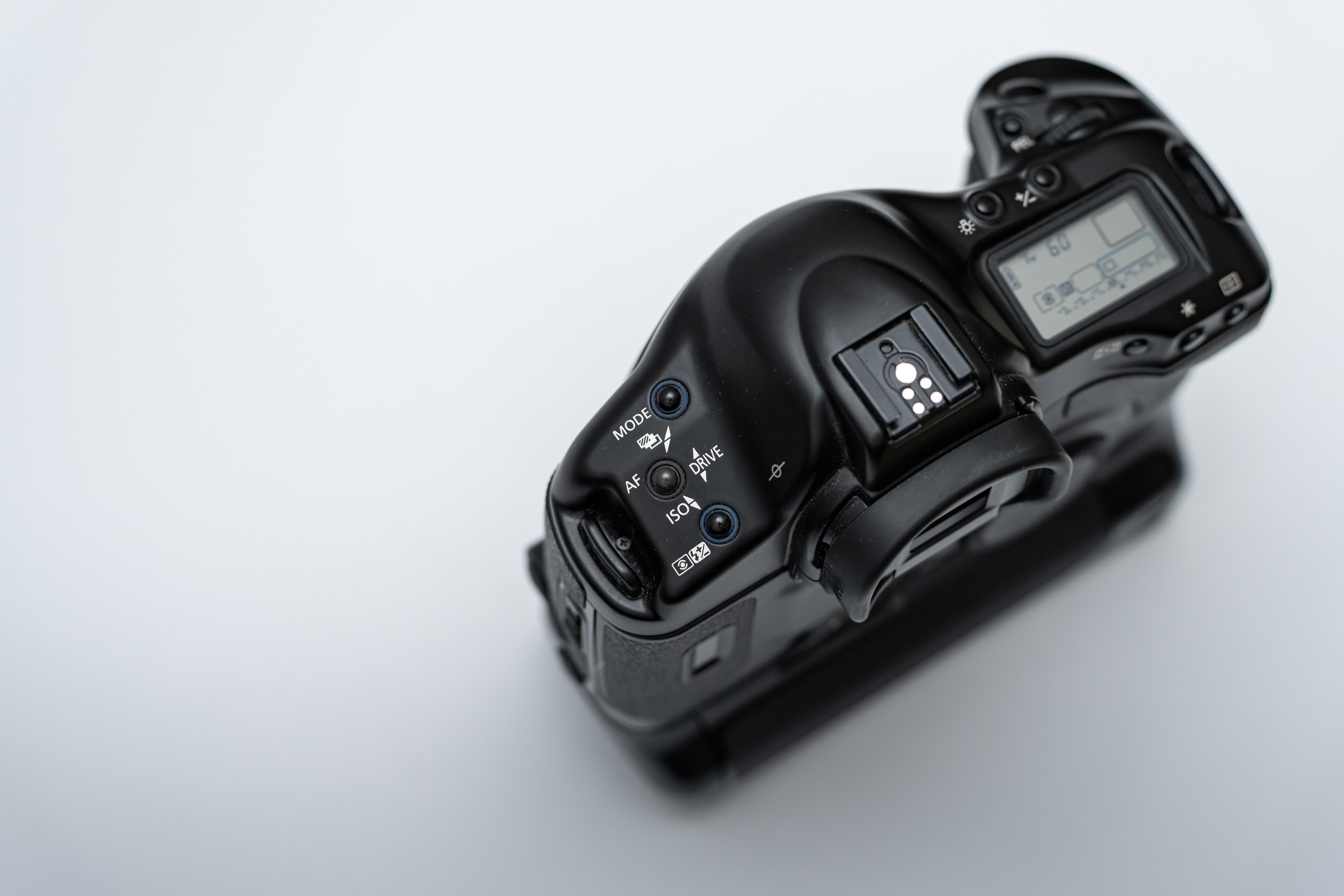

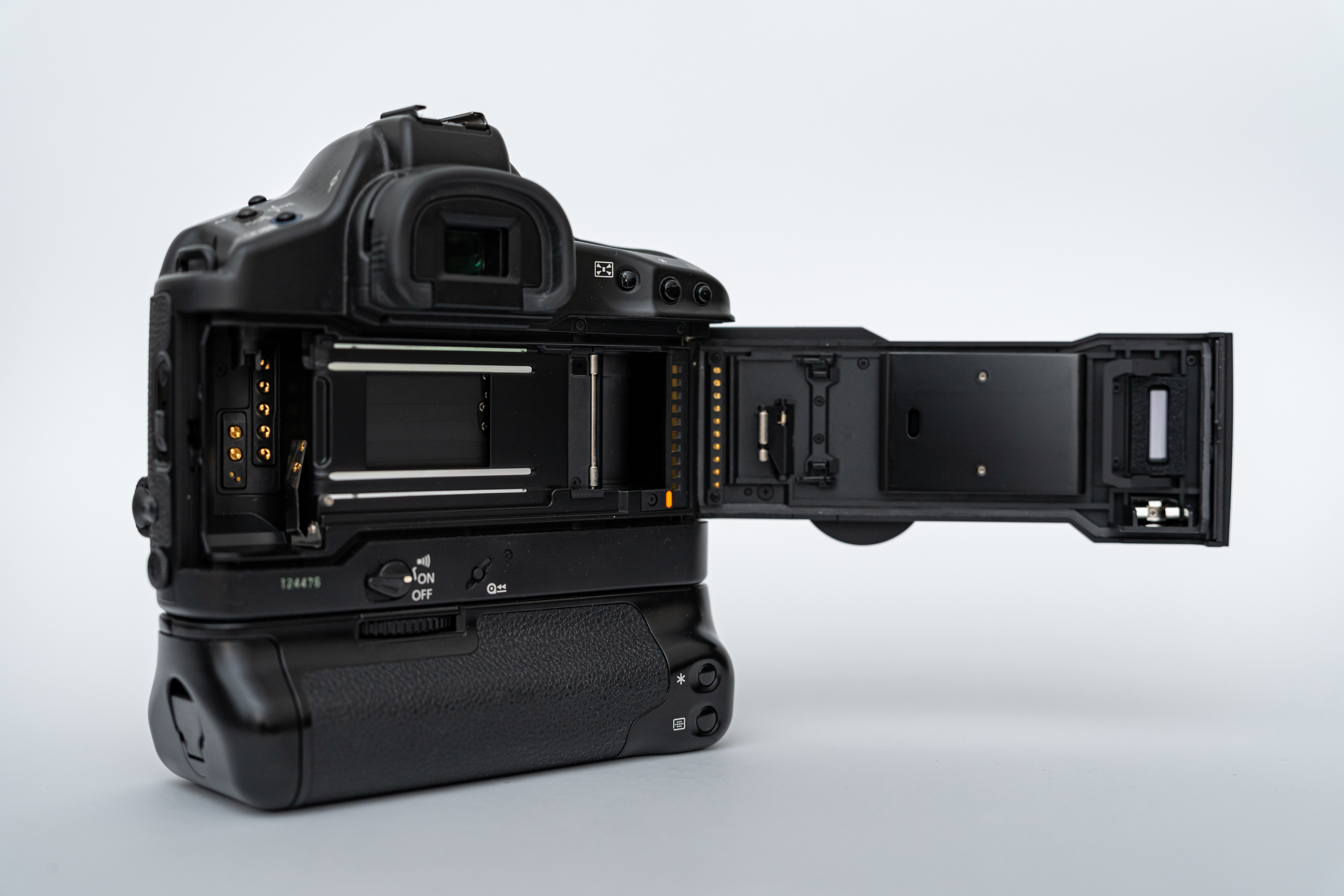

Class	1987	1988	1989	1990	1991	1992	1993	1994	1995	1996	1997	1998	1999	2000	2001	2002	2003	2004	2005	2006	2007	…	2018
Professional				1					1N					1V									
Professional				RT					1N RS														
High-end				10			5						3										
Advanced		620		600		100				50					30				30V				
Midrange	650				1000F	1000F N		500			500N			300			300V		300X				
Entry-level		750	850	700					5000				3000			3000N		3000V					
Entry-level											IX												
Entry-level												IX 7											
