= Canon EOS DCS 5 =

1995 crop-frame digital single-lens reflex camera

Overview
- Maker: Canon Inc.
- Type: Single-lens reflex with Digital back

Lens
- Lens: Interchangeable (EF)

Sensor/medium
- Sensor: CCD, 2.6x crop factor
- Maximum resolution: 1.524 x 1.012 (1.5 megapixels)
- Film speed: 100–400 color and 200–800 black and white model
- Storage media: PCMCIA card slot

Focusing
- Focus modes: One-shot, AI-Servo, AI-Focus, Manual
- Focus areas: 5 points
- Focus bracketing: none

Exposure/metering
- Exposure modes: Full auto, programmed, shutter-priority, aperture priority, manual
- Exposure metering: TTL, full aperture, zones
- Metering modes: Evaluative, Center Weighted, Average

Flash
- Flash: Canon hotshoe
- Flash bracketing: none

Shutter
- Shutter: electronic focal plane
- Shutter speed range: 30 to 1/8000 s
- Continuous shooting: 10 frames in 4 seconds

Viewfinder
- Viewfinder: Optical

Image processing
- White balance: 7 presets, including Auto and custom
- WB bracketing: none

General
- LCD screen: none
- Battery: Built-in, rechargeable
- Optional battery packs: none.
- Dimensions: 21.1 cm (8.3 in) x 16.3 cm (6.4 in) x 8.6 cm (3.4 in)
- Weight: 1.8 kg (4.0 lb) (body only)

The Canon EOS DCS 5 was Kodak's first Canon-based Digital SLR camera (a rebranded Kodak EOS DCS-5). It was released in March 1995. It combined an EOS-1N body with a modified Kodak digital back. The sensor had a size of 13.8 mm x 9.2 mm, which gives a factor of 2.6.

There were three different versions of this camera: 5c with color sensor, 5m with monochrome sensor, and 5IR with infrared sensor. It had an built-in microphone for recording verbal information for the images. A burst up to 10 images in 4 seconds was possible. At release, it sold for $11,995.

== See also ==
- Kodak DCS

Type	Sensor	Class	00	01	02	03	04	05	06	07	08	09	10	11	12	13	14	15	16	17	18	19	20	21	22	23	24	25
DSLR	Full-frame	Flagship				1Ds		1Ds Mk II			1Ds Mk III					1D C												
DSLR	Full-frame	Flagship				1Ds		1Ds Mk II			1Ds Mk III				1D X					1D X Mk II ^{T}			1D X Mk III ^{T}					
DSLR	APS-H	Flagship			1D			1D Mk II	1D Mk II N		1D Mk III		1D Mk IV															
DSLR	Full-frame	Professional																	5DS / 5DS R									
DSLR	Full-frame	Professional							5D			_{x} 5D Mk II			_{x} 5D Mk III					5D Mk IV ^{T}								
DSLR	Full-frame	Advanced														_{x} 6D					_{x} 6D Mk II ^{AT}							
DSLR	APS-C	Advanced											_{x} 7D					_{x} 7D Mk II										
DSLR	APS-C	Mid-range						20Da								_{x} 60Da ^{A}												
DSLR	APS-C	Mid-range		D30	D60	10D		20D	30D		40D	_{x} 50D		_{x} 60D ^{A}		_{x} 70D ^{AT}		80D ^{AT}					90D ^{AT}					
DSLR	APS-C	Mid-range																	760D ^{AT}		77D ^{AT}							
DSLR	APS-C	Entry-level					300D	350D		400D	450D	_{x} 500D	_{x} 550D	_{x} 600D ^{A}		_{x} 650D ^{AT}	_{x} 700D ^{AT}		_{x} 750D ^{AT}		800D ^{AT}			850D ^{AT}				
DSLR	APS-C	Entry-level															_{x} 100D ^{T}		_{x} 200D ^{AT}				250D ^{AT}					
DSLR	APS-C	Entry-level										1000D		_{x} 1100D			_{x} 1200D			1300D		2000D						
DSLR	APS-C	Value																				4000D						
Early models			Canon EOS DCS 5 (1995); Canon EOS DCS 3 (1995); Canon EOS DCS 1 (1995); Canon EOS D2000 (1998); Canon EOS D6000 (1998)																									
Type	Sensor	Spec																										
Type	Sensor	Spec	00	01	02	03	04	05	06	07	08	09	10	11	12	13	14	15	16	17	18	19	20	21	22	23	24	25
