= Canon EOS-1Ds =

2002 full-frame digital single-lens reflex camera

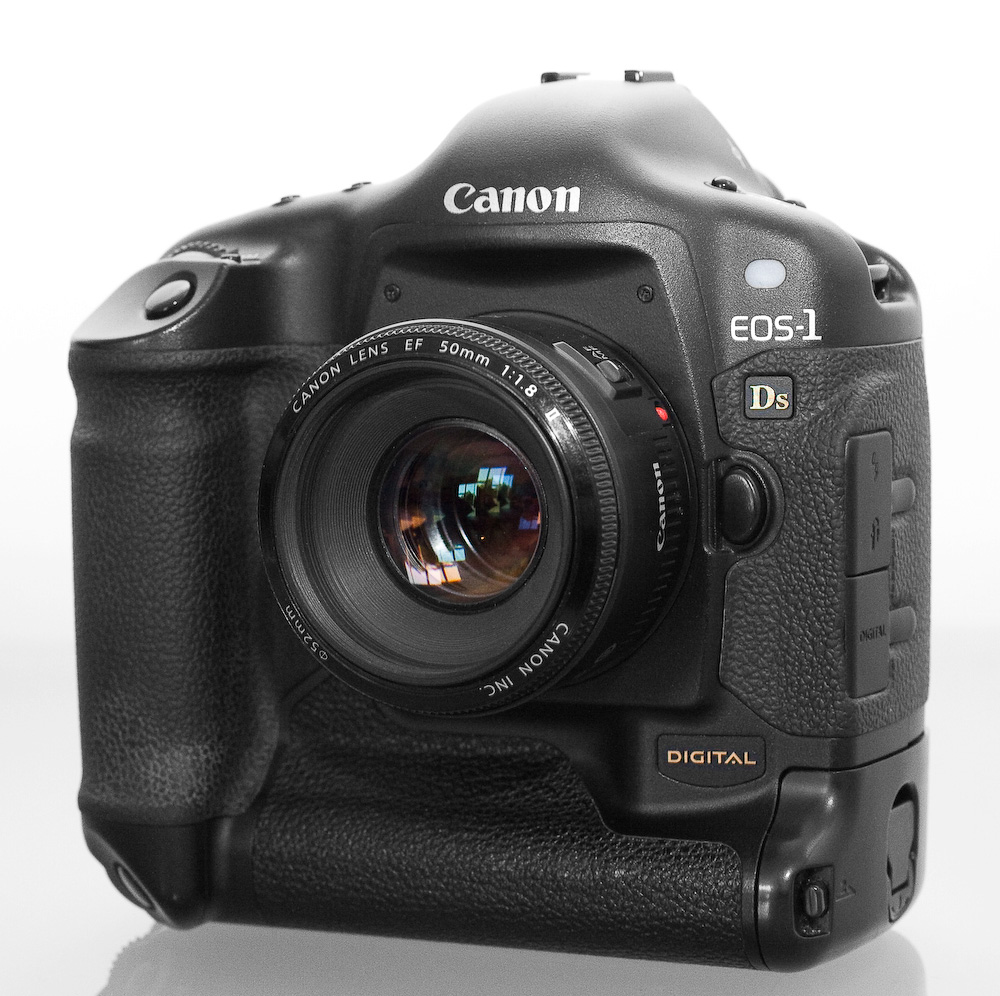

Overview
- Maker: Canon Inc.
- Type: Single-lens reflex
- Released: November 2002; 24 years ago

Lens
- Lens mount: Canon EF
- Lens: Interchangeable

Sensor/medium
- Sensor type: CMOS
- Sensor size: 35.8 × 23.8 mm
- Maximum resolution: 4,064 × 2,704 (11.1 megapixels)
- Film speed: ISO 100 – 1250 in 1/3 stops, plus 50 (L) as option
- Storage media: CompactFlash (Type I or Type II) / max 8 GB

Focusing
- Focus modes: One-shot, AI Servo, Manual
- Focus areas: 45 points

Exposure/metering
- Exposure metering: 21-zone TTL full aperture
- Metering modes: 21 area eval, partial, spot (center, AF point, multi-spot), center-weighted average

Shutter
- Shutter: Electronically controlled focal-plane
- Shutter speed range: 1/8000 to 30 sec. (1/3-stop increments), bulb, X-sync at 1/250 sec.
- Continuous shooting: approx 3 frame/s, 10 shot burst max

Viewfinder
- Viewfinder: Fixed eye-level pentaprism
- Frame coverage: 100%

General
- LCD screen: 5.1 cm (2.0 in), 120,000 pixels
- Battery: NP-E3 1650mAh, 19.8Wh Ni-MH rechargeable battery
- Dimensions: 156×158×80 mm (6.1×6.2×3.1 in)
- Weight: 1,265 g (44.6 oz) (body only)
- Made in: Japan

Chronology
- Predecessor: Canon EOS-1V, Canon EOS-1D
- Successor: Canon EOS-1Ds Mark II

The EOS-1Ds is an 11.1-megapixel full-frame digital SLR camera body made by Canon in the 1Ds series, released on 24 September 2002 as Canon's first full-frame DSLR. Its dimensions are 156 x 157.6 x 79.9 mm (6.1 x 6.2 x 3.1 in.); weight without a battery is 1,265 g.

The ~11 megapixel, full size 35mm digital camera had higher megapixel resolution and larger frame size than most others. The price was US$7,999 in 2002 (equivalent to $14,318 in 2025).

== Functions ==
The camera has two autofocus modes and an option for manual focusing. Its viewfinder is a glass pentaprism. It also has a two-inch, thin-film transistor, color liquid-crystal monitor with approximately 120,000 pixels.

The camera's image sensor is a CMOS-based integrated circuit with Bayer filters for RGB color detection (Canon calls it single-plate, in contrast with three-CCD sensors). It has approximately 11.4 million effective pixels. A non-removable optical anti-aliasing filter is located in front of the image sensor.

The camera has an electronically controlled focal-plane shutter with maximum speed 1/8,000 of a second. Soft-touch shutter release is implemented electrically.

== See also ==
- Canon EOS
- Canon EF lens mount

Type	Sensor	Class	00	01	02	03	04	05	06	07	08	09	10	11	12	13	14	15	16	17	18	19	20	21	22	23	24	25	26
DSLR	Full-frame	Flagship				1Ds		1Ds Mk II			1Ds Mk III					1D C													
DSLR	Full-frame	Flagship				1Ds		1Ds Mk II			1Ds Mk III				1D X					1D X Mk II ^{T}			1D X Mk III ^{T}						
DSLR	APS-H	Flagship			1D			1D Mk II	1D Mk II N		1D Mk III		1D Mk IV																
DSLR	Full-frame	Professional																	5DS / 5DS R										
DSLR	Full-frame	Professional							5D			_{x} 5D Mk II			_{x} 5D Mk III					5D Mk IV ^{T}									
DSLR	Full-frame	Advanced														_{x} 6D					_{x} 6D Mk II ^{AT}								
DSLR	APS-C	Advanced											_{x} 7D					_{x} 7D Mk II											
DSLR	APS-C	Mid-range						20Da								_{x} 60Da ^{A}													
DSLR	APS-C	Mid-range		D30	D60	10D		20D	30D		40D	_{x} 50D		_{x} 60D ^{A}			_{x} 70D ^{AT}		80D ^{AT}				90D ^{AT}						
DSLR	APS-C	Mid-range																	760D ^{AT}		77D ^{AT}								
DSLR	APS-C	Entry-level					300D	350D		400D	450D	_{x} 500D	_{x} 550D	_{x} 600D ^{A}		_{x} 650D ^{AT}	_{x} 700D ^{AT}		_{x} 750D ^{AT}		800D ^{AT}			850D ^{AT}					
DSLR	APS-C	Entry-level															_{x} 100D ^{T}		_{x} 200D ^{AT}				250D ^{AT}						
DSLR	APS-C	Entry-level										1000D		_{x} 1100D			_{x} 1200D			1300D		2000D							
DSLR	APS-C	Value																				4000D							
Early models			Canon EOS DCS 5 (1995); Canon EOS DCS 3 (1995); Canon EOS DCS 1 (1995); Canon EOS D2000 (1998); Canon EOS D6000 (1998)																										
Type	Sensor	Spec																											
Type	Sensor	Spec	00	01	02	03	04	05	06	07	08	09	10	11	12	13	14	15	16	17	18	19	20	21	22	23	24	25	26
