= Canon EOS-1N =

1994 35mm single-lens reflex camera

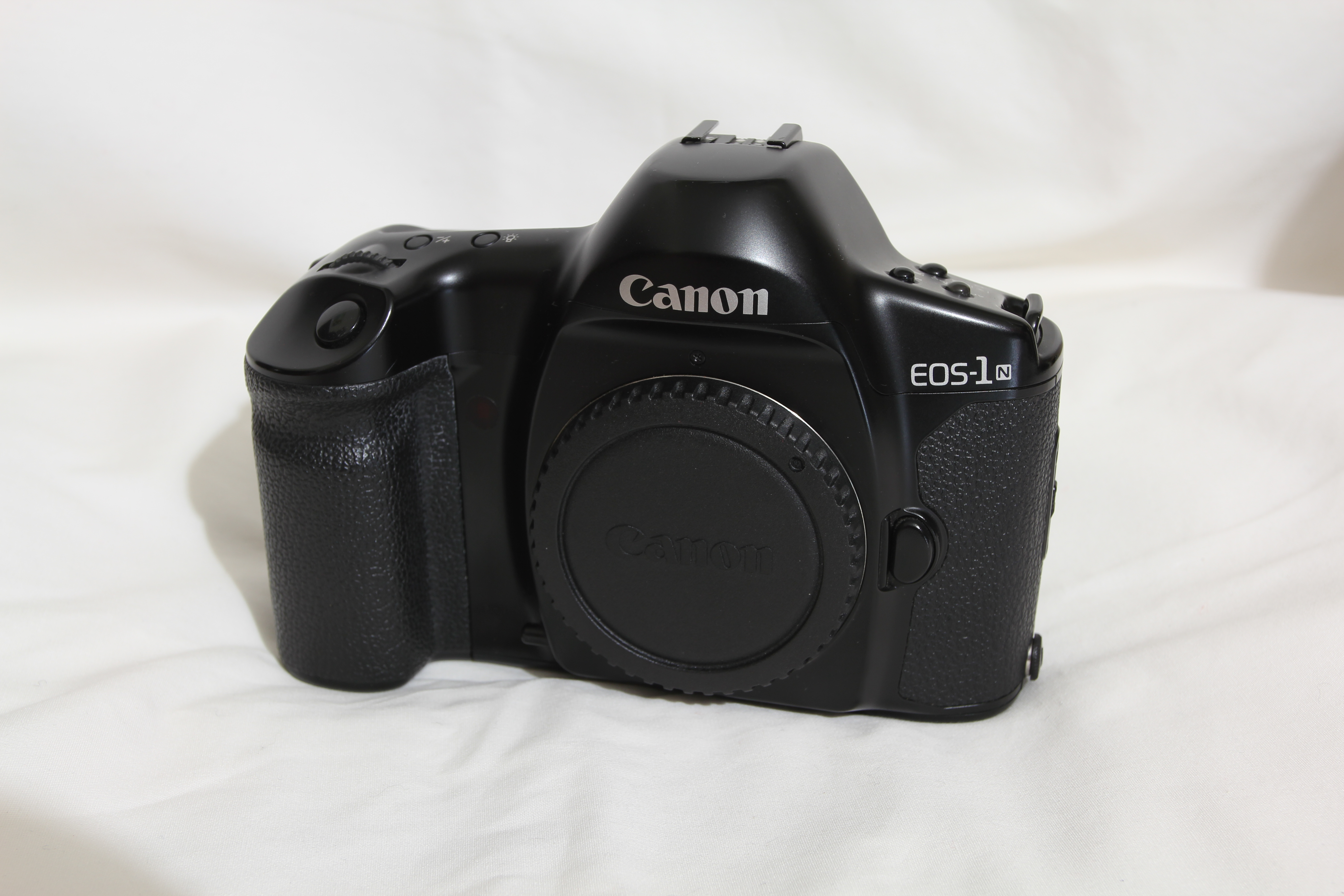

Overview
- Maker: Canon Inc.
- Type: Single-lens reflex
- Released: November 1994
- Production: 1994 – 2000
- Intro price: 215,000¥

Lens
- Lens mount: Canon EF
- Lens: Interchangeable

Sensor/medium
- Film format: 135 film
- Film size: 36 × 24 mm
- Film speed: ISO 6 – 6400
- Film speed detection: Yes

Focusing
- Focus: TTL Phase Detection Autofocus (5 zone)

Exposure/metering
- Exposure: Programmed, shutter priority, aperture priority, manual, depth-of-field AE. Metering: 16-zone evaluative, centre weighted, partial, spot, and fine centre spot

Shutter
- Frame rate: Up to 6 frame/s with Power Drive Booster PB-E1
- Shutter speed range: 30s – 1/8000s

Viewfinder
- Viewfinder: Fixed eye-level pentaprism
- Frame coverage: 100%

General
- Battery: 2CR5
- Optional battery packs: BP-E1 Battery Pack or PB-E1 Power Booster
- Dimensions: 161×112×72 mm (6.3×4.4×2.8 in)
- Weight: 855 g (30.2 oz) (including battery)

Chronology
- Replaced: Canon EOS-1
- Replaced by: Canon EOS-1V

The EOS-1N is a 35mm single lens reflex (SLR) camera body produced by Canon. It was announced by Canon in 1994, and was the professional model in the range, superseding the original Canon EOS-1. The camera was itself superseded by the EOS-1V in 2000.

The original EOS-1 had been launched in 1989, two years after the company had introduced their new EOS autofocus system. It was the company's first professional-level EOS camera and was aimed at the same photographers who had used Canon's highly regarded, manual focus professional FD mount SLRs, such as the Canon New F-1 and the Canon T90. On a physical level the EOS-1 resembled the T90, which had been designed for Canon by Luigi Colani. The EOS-1N was a revision of the EOS-1, with five autofocus points spread across the frame rather than a single centrally mounted autofocus point, plus more effective weather sealing, a wider exposure range, and numerous other improvements. In common with the EOS-1, the 1N used Canon's A-TTL automatic flash system, and does not support the more modern E-TTL.

== Features ==
At the time of its creation, The Canon EOS-1N was placed at the top of Canon's EOS camera line. The camera featured polycarbonate external construction with weather-resistant seals around buttons, dials, and its Canon EF lens mount.

The fixed eye-level pentaprism viewfinder has 100-percent vertical and horizontal coverage, has dioptric viewfinder adjustment from –3 to +1 diopter and has as a viewfinder eyepiece blind to block stray light when on a tripod.

For automatic focusing, the camera used a 5-point BASIS auto focus system with the sensors arranged horizontally across the middle of the viewing area. The center point is a cross-type, which detects horizontal and vertical lines, while the outer four detect vertical lines only.

Metering modes include a 16-zone evaluative, center-weighted average, partial, selectable spot, and fine central spot metering mode. Film speeds can be set from ISO 6-6400 either manually or automatically by DX codes on the film canisters.

The camera allows variable Program autoexposure, as well as aperture-priority and shutter-priority automatic exposure and manual exposure. Another option is Depth-of-field AE (DEP), an automatic mode that selects the focusing distance and aperture f-number to place the depth of field between two user-specified near and far points.

Shutter speeds range from 30 seconds to 1/8000 of a second in all exposure modes. A non-timed bulb speed is available. Flash X-sync is available up to a shutter speed of 1/250 of a second.

There are 14 custom functions to change the way the camera operates, which set options like exposure steps and mirror lock-up.

The camera has user-interchangeable focusing screens, interchangeable with those out of other EOS-1-series cameras, and a now-discontinued interchangeable Canon Command Back E1.

Power comes from one 2CR5 battery, an optional BP-E1 Battery Pack housing four AA alkaline or lithium batteries or the PB-E1 Power Booster drive housing eight AA batteries and allowing for 6 frames per second to be photographed, depending on the type of battery and the shutter speed selected.

The camera weighs in at 855 grams, or 1 lb and 14.15 oz.

== Background ==
There were several versions of the EOS-1N available. The base model EOS-1N consisted of the standard camera body with significant upgrades over the EOS-1, launched in 1989. The EOS-1N DP comprised the standard body and the BP-E1 pack (see below) and the EOS-1N HS comprised the standard body plus booster (see below).

One feature the EOS-1N (and previous/subsequent '1' models) lacks, which lower models in the range have, is built-in flash, intentionally omitted to provide an overall very rigid camera body able to withstand severe treatment by professionals. Weather sealing was incorporated after feedback from working professionals. Other notable omissions are the eye-controlled focus feature of the EOS-5 and the bar code reader of the EOS-10, neither of which are professional-level cameras.

Another feature of the EOS-1N, and other professional models in the range, is the provision for a precise viewfinder indication of exposure in manual mode. This had previously been provided in fully manual cameras such as the F-1, but older Canon cameras with automatic exposure modes merely provided a recommended exposure reading in manual mode, leaving the user to accept the offered settings or not. The EOS-1N provides a viewfinder readout similar to the old F-1's needle display, but in electronic LCD form showing steps in 0.3, 0.5 or 1 stops. Like the EOS-5, the internal displays of the EOS-1N self-adjust in brightness in response to the brightness level of the subject.

The optional Power Booster PB-E1 or Battery Pack BP-E1 attach to the base of the camera. The PB-E1 holds 8 AA batteries or an optional Ni-Cd pack, and boosts the standard frame rate from 3 frames per second to 6 (5 when using AI Servo AF). The PB-E1 has a shutter release and AE Lock button for use when shooting in the vertical format. There is also a Power Booster PB-E2 which adds a main control dial, focusing point selector button, and FE Lock/multi-spot metering button. The PB-E2 was designed for the later EOS-3 camera, and only provides the functionality of a PB-E1 when attached to an EOS-1 or 1N.

The BP-E1 is a lighter and simpler accessory. This holds a 2CR5 lithium battery and 4 AA cells (in the removable Battery Magazine BM-1). The user can select between the two power sources with a switch. It provides a grip for vertical shots but no additional controls. The major appeal of the Battery Pack BP-E1 is that is lighter and less expensive than the PB-E1, while still providing the advantage of using inexpensive AA batteries.

In addition to the standard EOS-1N there was another, specialized model in the range — the EOS-1N RS, introduced in 1995, with a permanently attached power drive booster. This camera has a fixed pellicle mirror so there is no viewfinder black-out at the moment of exposure. The fixed mirror allows high-speed continuous shooting at a top speed of 10 frames per second, with a shutter release lag as low as 6 ms. There is a cost to this however: slightly less light reaches the film, as some is always being directed up to the viewfinder and optical quality loss. By the time of the release of the next generation EOS-1V, considerable technical improvements to the standard camera design meant that Canon no longer offered RS model variants.

The EOS-1N was discontinued in 2000 with the arrival of the EOS-1V.

== Digital ==
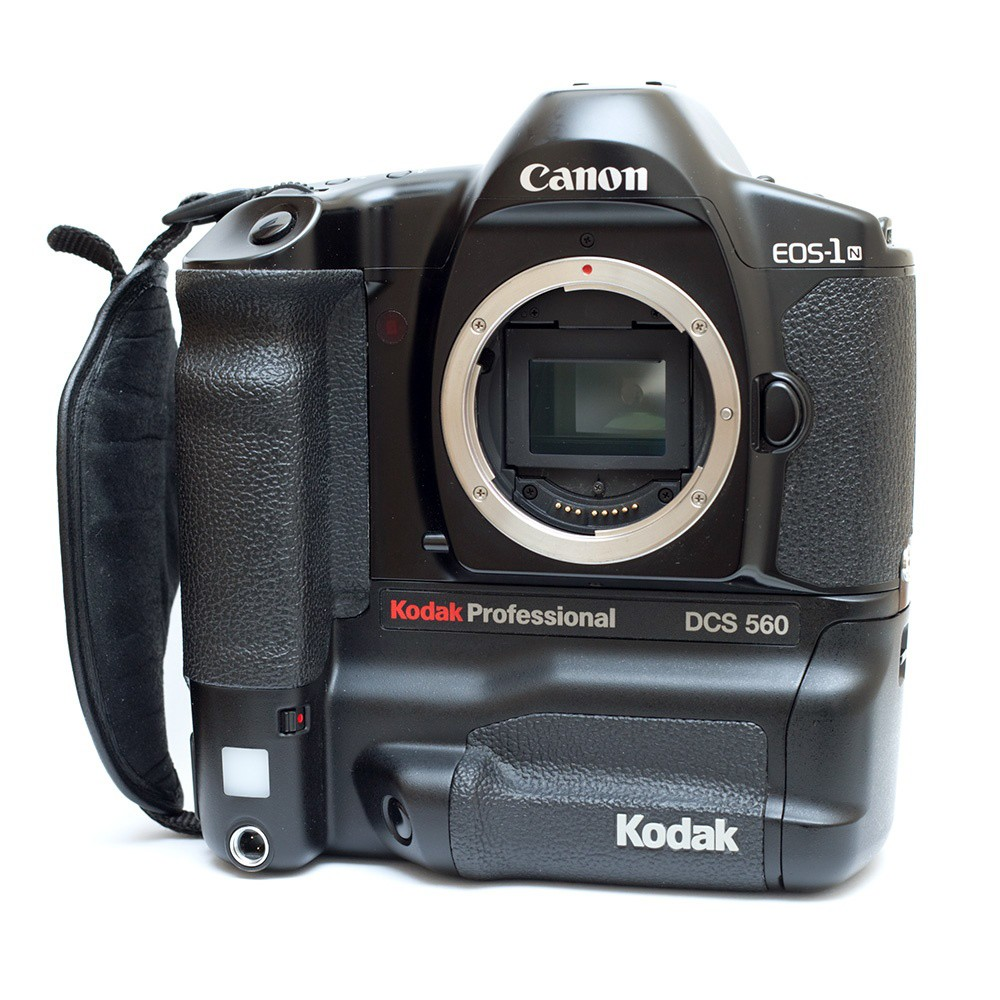
A Kodak DCS 560, part of the second generation of digital SLRs derived from the EOS-1N

During the late 1990s, Canon and Kodak collaborated on a range of professional digital SLRs which combined Canon EOS-1N bodies with Kodak digital sensors and electronics. They were Canon's first ventures into the digital SLR marketplace and divided into two distinct generations.

The first generation was the Kodak EOS DCS series of 1995, which encompassed the 6 mp EOS DCS 1, the 1.3 mp DCS 3, and the 1.5 mp DCS 5. The EOS-1N camera bodies were almost unmodified from stock configuration, and were mounted on a removable Kodak digital back.

The relationship continued with the Kodak DCS 500 series, which fully integrated the EOS-1N body with Kodak's imaging components. The range consisted of the 2 mp DCS 520 and the 6 mp DCS 560. The two cameras were also sold by Canon, as the Canon EOS D2000 and Canon EOS D6000 respectively. Canon's subsequent professional digital SLRs were produced independently of Kodak, and were initially based on the EOS-1V, before moving to custom-designed digital bodies.

Class	1987	1988	1989	1990	1991	1992	1993	1994	1995	1996	1997	1998	1999	2000	2001	2002	2003	2004	2005	2006	2007	…	2018
Professional				1					1N					1V									
Professional				RT					1N RS														
High-end				10			5						3										
Advanced		620		600		100				50					30				30V				
Midrange	650				1000F	1000F N		500			500N			300			300V		300X				
Entry-level		750	850	700					5000				3000			3000N		3000V					
Entry-level											IX												
Entry-level												IX 7											
