= Canon EOS-1D =

2001 APS-H digital single-lens reflex camera

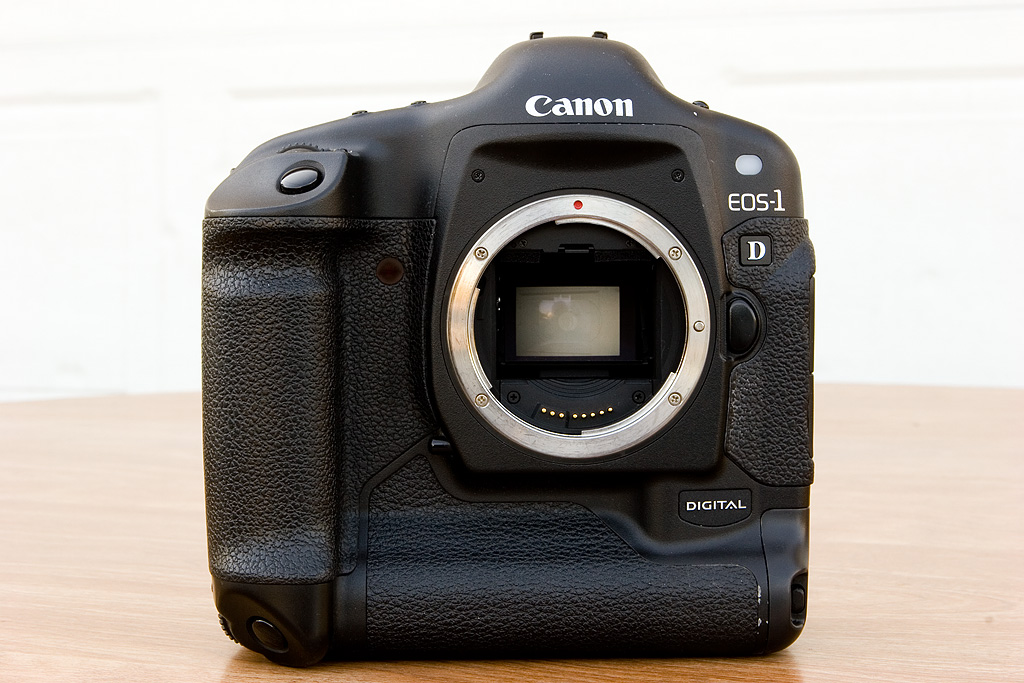

Overview
- Maker: Canon Inc.
- Type: Single-lens reflex
- Released: December 2001
- Intro price: 750,000¥

Lens
- Lens mount: Canon EF
- Lens: Interchangeable (EF)

Sensor/medium
- Sensor: 28.7 mm x 19.1 mm CCD
- Maximum resolution: 2464 x 1648 (4.15 megapixels)
- Film speed: 200–1600 in 1/3 EV steps, 100 and 3200 in extended mode
- Storage media: CompactFlash(CF) (Type I or Type II) / max 2GB

Focusing
- Focus modes: One-shot, AI Servo, Manual
- Focus areas: 45 autofocus points
- Focus bracketing: none

Exposure/metering
- Exposure modes: Full auto, programmed, shutter-priority, aperture priority, manual
- Exposure metering: TTL full aperture, evaluative, partial, spot, center-weighted
- Metering modes: Evaluative, Partial, Spot, C/Wgt Average

Flash
- Flash: none, hot-shoe
- Flash bracketing: none

Shutter
- Shutter: Electronic shutter, all speeds electronically controlled
- Shutter speed range: 1/16,000 to 30s, Bulb
- Continuous shooting: 8.0 frame/s., up to 21 frames

Viewfinder
- Viewfinder: Optical

Image processing
- White balance: 10 presets, Auto and custom
- WB bracketing: 3 images, +/-3 levels

General
- LCD screen: 2.0 in (51 mm), 120,000 pixels
- Battery: Ni-MH NP-E3 rechargeable
- Optional battery packs: none
- Weight: 1,250g (body only)
- Made in: Japan

Chronology
- Predecessor: Canon EOS-1V
- Successor: Canon EOS-1D Mark II, Canon EOS-1Ds

The Canon EOS-1D is a professional digital single-lens reflex camera announced in September 2001 and released in December 2001 as part of Canon's flagship EOS-1 series. It was the first digital camera in the EOS-1 line, succeeding Canon's final flagship film camera, the 1V. It was also the first professional-level digital camera developed and released entirely by Canon, the previous D2000 being a collaborative effort with Kodak. It has a 1.3x crop factor and a CCD image sensor that was not developed by Canon; the company declined to name its manufacturer. The camera shares its body design with the EOS-1V 35mm camera (with the additional battery grip attached). It was complemented by the slower, higher-resolution 1Ds in 2002 and succeeded by the 1D Mark II in April 2004.

== Features ==
The 1D was seen as a major breakthrough for a professional news and sports camera after its predecessors, the Canon EOS DCS series and EOS D2000, which had both been produced in co-operation with Kodak. Those cameras had suffered from long shutter lag; the 1D's lag of 55 milliseconds was the same as that of the EOS-1V film camera, and at eight frames per second it was the fastest digital SLR when it was released.

Canon chose a CCD sensor, rather than a CMOS sensor like that of its EOS D30, because a CCD could move image data into the buffer fast enough for that frame rate. It kept the resolution to about four megapixels to balance frame rate, resolution and price. The 1Ds and 1D Mark II that followed used CMOS sensors.

The shutter combined an electronic shutter on the sensor with a focal-plane shutter, giving speeds of up to 1/16,000 of a second and an X-sync speed of up to 1/500 of a second. In continuous shooting the buffer held up to 21 JPEG or 16 RAW images. The only computer connection was FireWire (IEEE 1394); there was no serial port, for a GPS for example, and no video output. The LCD could not magnify images in playback; a Canon contact told DPReview that professionals would not need the feature. The 1D Mark II added magnification of up to 10x.

The 1D also included a microphone for voice annotations of up to 30 seconds. This feature had been present in the earlier D2000, and was retained on later professional models. In addition the camera used an externally mounted white balance sensor, another feature which had earlier appeared on the D2000.

Type	Sensor	Class	00	01	02	03	04	05	06	07	08	09	10	11	12	13	14	15	16	17	18	19	20	21	22	23	24	25	26
DSLR	Full-frame	Flagship				1Ds		1Ds Mk II			1Ds Mk III					1D C													
DSLR	Full-frame	Flagship				1Ds		1Ds Mk II			1Ds Mk III				1D X					1D X Mk II ^{T}			1D X Mk III ^{T}						
DSLR	APS-H	Flagship			1D			1D Mk II	1D Mk II N		1D Mk III		1D Mk IV																
DSLR	Full-frame	Professional																	5DS / 5DS R										
DSLR	Full-frame	Professional							5D			_{x} 5D Mk II			_{x} 5D Mk III					5D Mk IV ^{T}									
DSLR	Full-frame	Advanced														_{x} 6D					_{x} 6D Mk II ^{AT}								
DSLR	APS-C	Advanced											_{x} 7D					_{x} 7D Mk II											
DSLR	APS-C	Mid-range						20Da								_{x} 60Da ^{A}													
DSLR	APS-C	Mid-range		D30	D60	10D		20D	30D		40D	_{x} 50D		_{x} 60D ^{A}			_{x} 70D ^{AT}		80D ^{AT}				90D ^{AT}						
DSLR	APS-C	Mid-range																	760D ^{AT}		77D ^{AT}								
DSLR	APS-C	Entry-level					300D	350D		400D	450D	_{x} 500D	_{x} 550D	_{x} 600D ^{A}		_{x} 650D ^{AT}	_{x} 700D ^{AT}		_{x} 750D ^{AT}		800D ^{AT}			850D ^{AT}					
DSLR	APS-C	Entry-level															_{x} 100D ^{T}		_{x} 200D ^{AT}				250D ^{AT}						
DSLR	APS-C	Entry-level										1000D		_{x} 1100D			_{x} 1200D			1300D		2000D							
DSLR	APS-C	Value																				4000D							
Early models			Canon EOS DCS 5 (1995); Canon EOS DCS 3 (1995); Canon EOS DCS 1 (1995); Canon EOS D2000 (1998); Canon EOS D6000 (1998)																										
Type	Sensor	Spec																											
Type	Sensor	Spec	00	01	02	03	04	05	06	07	08	09	10	11	12	13	14	15	16	17	18	19	20	21	22	23	24	25	26
