= Canon EOS-1 =

1989 35mm single-lens reflex camera

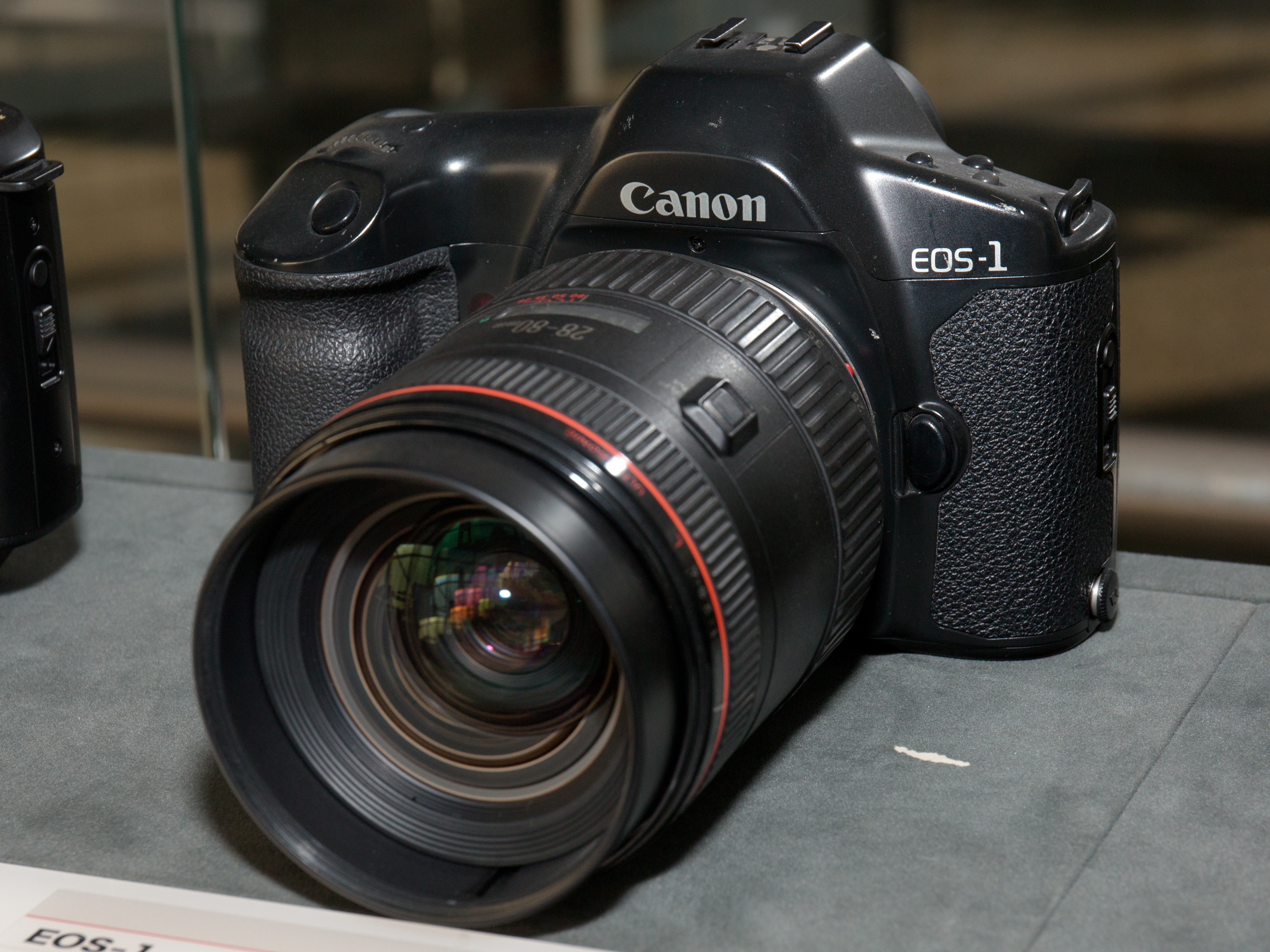

Overview
- Maker: Canon Inc.
- Type: Single-lens reflex
- Released: September 1989
- Production: 1989 - 1994
- Intro price: 189,000¥

Lens
- Lens mount: Canon EF
- Lens: Interchangeable

Sensor/medium
- Film format: 135 film
- Film size: 36 × 24 mm

Focusing
- Focus: TTL Phase Detection Autofocus (1 zone)

Shutter
- Frame rate: 2.5 frame/s alone, 5.5 frame/s with Power Drive Booster E1
- Shutter speed range: 30s – 1/8000s

Viewfinder
- Viewfinder: Fixed eye-level pentaprism
- Frame coverage: 100%

General
- Battery: 2CR5
- Optional battery packs: BP-E1 Battery Pack or PB-E1 Power Booster
- Dimensions: 161 mm × 107 mm × 72 mm (6.3 in × 4.2 in × 2.8 in)
- Weight: 890 g (31 oz) (including battery)
- Replaced by: Canon EOS-1N

The EOS-1 is a 35mm single lens reflex (SLR) camera body produced by Canon. It was announced by Canon in 1989, and was the professional model in the range. The camera also had a successor, the Canon EOS-1N, in 1994.

The original EOS-1 was launched in 1989. It was the company's first professional-level EOS camera and was aimed at the same photographers who had used Canon's highly respected, manual focus professional FD mount SLRs, such as the Canon New F-1 and the Canon T90. On a physical level the EOS-1 resembled the T90, which had been designed for Canon by Luigi Colani. The EOS-1 had a single centrally mounted autofocus point, plus basic weather sealing.

== Features ==
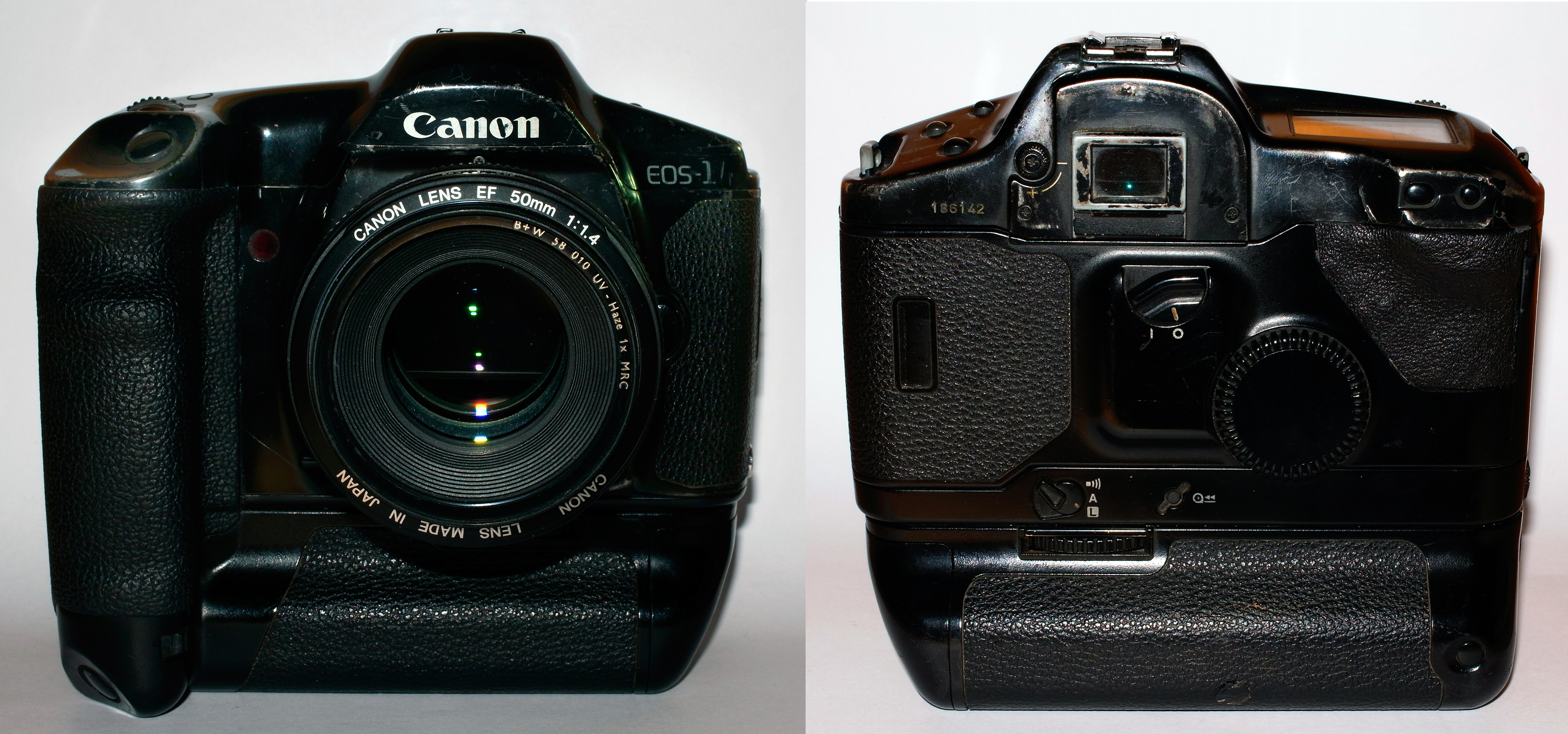
The EOS-1 with the PB-E1 Power Drive Booster

At the time of its creation, The Canon EOS-1 was placed at the top of Canon's EOS camera line. The camera featured a plastic shell (polycarbonate) over diecast aluminium frame and anti-slip artificial leather.

The fixed eye-level pentaprism viewfinder has 100-percent vertical and horizontal coverage.

Shutter speeds range from 30 seconds to 1/8000 of a second in all exposure modes.

There are 8 custom functions to change the way the camera operates, which set options such as exposure steps, mirror lock-up,

Power comes from one 2CR5 battery, an optional BP-E1 Battery Pack housing four AA alkaline or lithium batteries or the PB-E1 Power Booster drive housing eight AA batteries and allowing for 5.5 frames per second to be photographed, depending on the type of battery and the shutter speed selected.

The camera weighs in at 890 grams loaded with a battery.

== Background ==
There were two versions of the Canon EOS-1 available on launch. There was the Standard body only option, and a more premium High Speed option called the Canon EOS-1 HS. The HS kit came with the body and the additional Power Drive Booster E1, which allowed for up to 5.5 frames per second. The HS option was mainly used for sports and wildlife photography.

The EOS-1 was discontinued in 1994 with the arrival of the EOS-1N.

Class	1987	1988	1989	1990	1991	1992	1993	1994	1995	1996	1997	1998	1999	2000	2001	2002	2003	2004	2005	2006	2007	…	2018
Professional				1					1N					1V									
Professional				RT					1N RS														
High-end				10			5						3										
Advanced		620		600		100				50					30				30V				
Midrange	650				1000F	1000F N		500			500N			300			300V		300X				
Entry-level		750	850	700					5000				3000			3000N		3000V					
Entry-level											IX												
Entry-level												IX 7											
