= Canon New F-1 =

FD-mount 35mm single-lens reflex camera

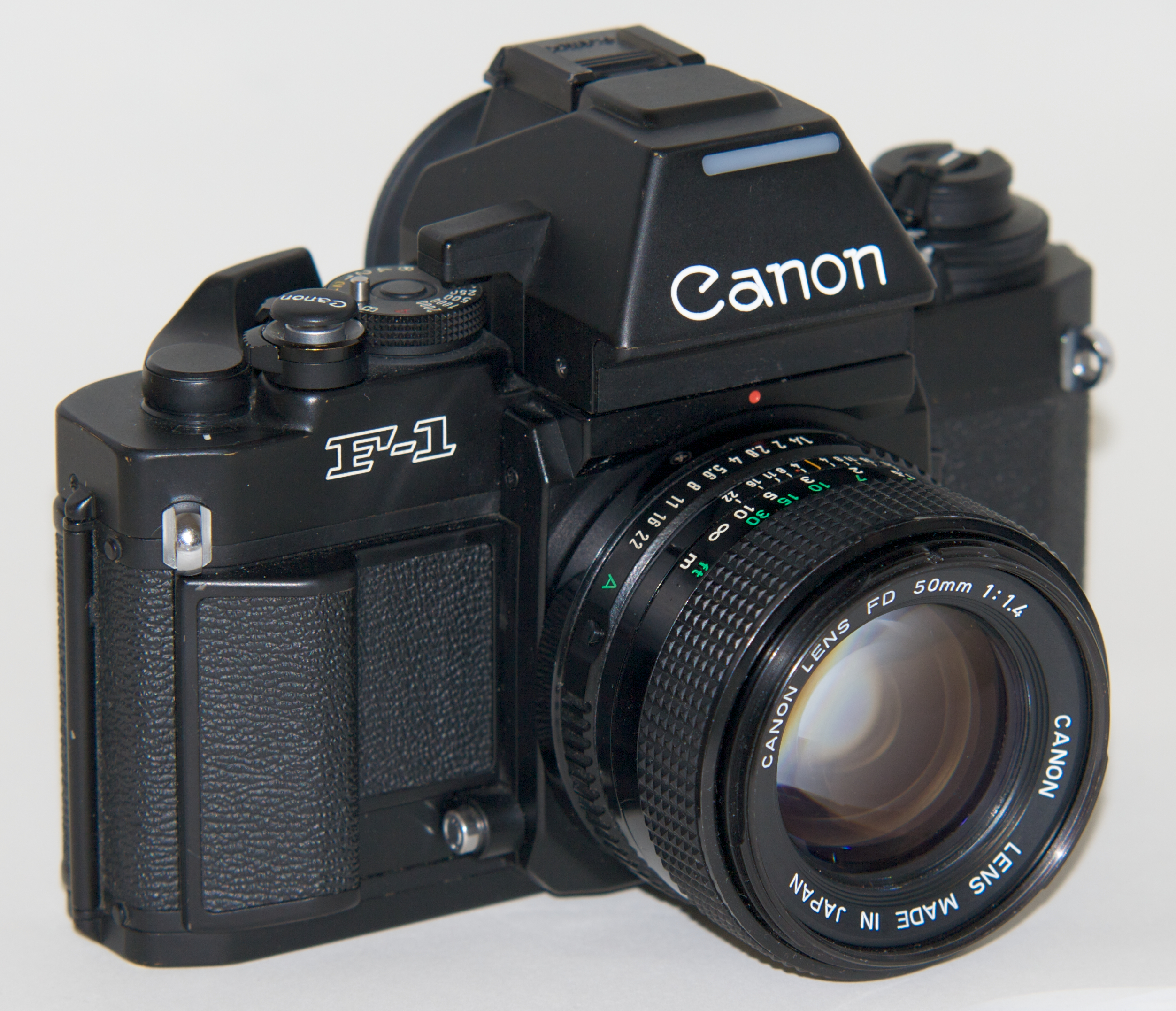

Overview
- Maker: Canon Camera K. K.
- Type: 35 mm SLR
- Released: 1981
- Production: 1981-1994

Lens
- Lens mount: Canon FD

Sensor/medium
- Film speed: ISO 6 to 6400 [manual]

Focusing
- Focus: Manual

Exposure/metering
- Exposure: Shutter priority, aperture priority, manual
- Exposure metering: EV-1 to EV20 @ ASA 100

Flash
- Flash: Hot shoe
- Flash synchronization: 1/90 s

Shutter
- Frame rate: Manual lever winding, unmodified
- Shutter: Titanium, four-shaft, horizontal-travel focal plane shutter
- Shutter speed range: 8 s to 1/60 s [electronic] 1/90 s to 1/2000 s [mechanical]

General
- Battery: 4LR44 6V battery or 4 LR44 1.5 volt batteries
- Dimensions: 96.6×146.7×48.3 mm (3.80×5.78×1.90 in)
- Weight: 795 g (28 oz)
- Made in: Japan

Chronology
- Predecessor: Canon F-1(n)
- Successor: Canon T90; Canon EOS-1

The Canon New F-1 is a professional 35 mm single-lens reflex camera that replaced the F-1n (an upgraded F-1) as Canon's top-of-the-line 35mm single-lens reflex camera in September 1981. Like the earlier models, the New F-1 takes FD-mount lenses. Although no date has ever been confirmed, it is thought that the last New F-1 was made in 1992. It was officially discontinued in 1994, and factory support ended in 2004.

== Overview ==
The New F-1 is a manual-exposure camera capable of TTL full-aperture metering and stopped-down metering with the included Eye-Level Finder FN using a match-needle metering system. Aperture priority autoexposure is available by attaching the optional AE Finder FN. Also, shutter priority mode is optionally available when using either AE Motor Drive FN or AE Power Winder FN. The New F-1 is also capable of operating in aperture priority mode with earlier Canon lenses which do not have an automatic diaphragm.

Batteries are housed behind the right-hand grip on the front of the camera.

Shutter speed timing is provided by both mechanical and electronic methods. In the manual exposure mode, the camera uses mechanical timing for the fast speeds (1/2000 – 1/125 s + X (flash synch, 1/90 s) and B) and electronic timing for the slow speeds (1/60 – 8 s). When aperture-priority autoexposure is used, all shutter speeds are electronically timed, and the fastest speed is reduced to 1/1000 s.

Metering patterns compared for the New F-1: (P)artial-area (rectangular shaded area) and (S)pot (circular spot)

Metering patterns are determined by the focusing screen in use, as each focusing screen incorporates a beam-splitter grating to redirect some light to the silicon photodiode metering cell in the body; in the previous F-1, the light-splitting device was a partially-silvered mirror in the condenser, which was mounted in the body. With many of the screens, the New F-1 has a choice between center-weighted averaging, selective-area (a rectangular frame in the center, covering approximately 12% of the overall frame area, similar to the prior F-1), or spot metering patterns (a circular frame in the center, covering approximately 3% of the overall frame area).

== System camera ==
The New F-1 is an expandable system. It includes interchangeable viewfinders, focusing screens, motor drives, and alternate backs, all of which are specific to the New F-1. All other Canon components, such as the FD lens series, close up accessories (bellows, extension tubes, etc.), and Canon A and T Speedlights (except the 300TL) are also compatible with the system.

=== Interchangeable viewfinders ===
The New F-1 system has 5 different viewfinders, which can be quickly and easily changed by depressing the two buttons on the rear of the finder, pulling it off the camera body, and pushing the new finder into place.

- Eye-Level Finder FN
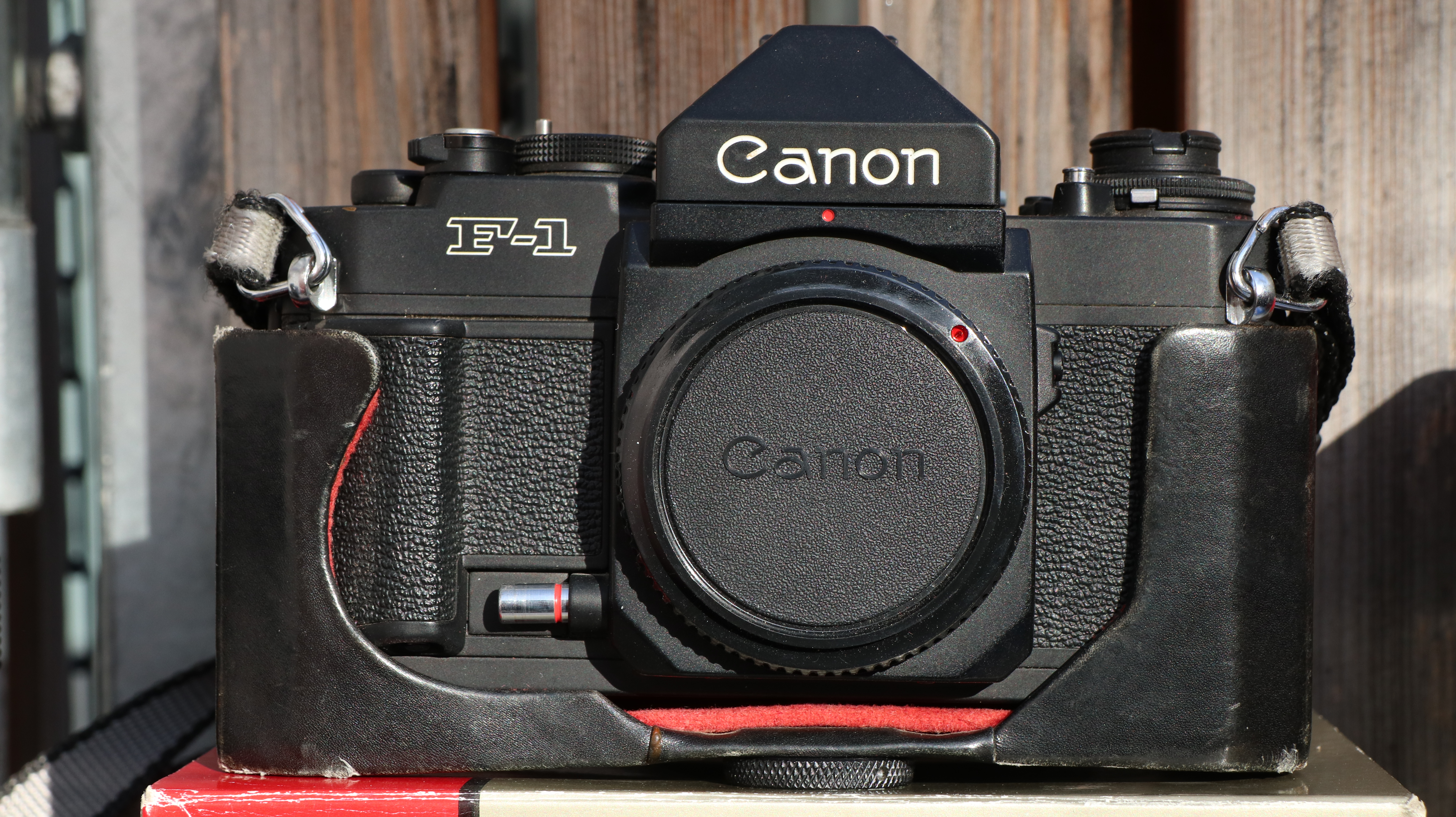
  New F-1 with Eye-Level Finder FN
- AE Finder FN
  The Eye-Level and AE Finders are the basic eye-level prism finders, similar to most other SLR systems' prism finders. Both include a hot shoe for on-camera flash, or attachments to remotely trigger the shutter. Both also include an integral eyepiece shutter, which closes over the eyepiece to prevent light leakage during long exposures.
  When using the AE finder, setting the shutter speed dial to 'A' engages a small switch on the finder which puts the camera into aperture-priority auto exposure mode. The normal meter display to the right of the through-the-lens (TTL) image disappears from the viewfinder, and a different meter display appears below the TTL image, which indicates which shutter speed the AE system has chosen.
- Speed Finder FN
  The Speed Finder uses two separate prisms separated by a swivel, to allow either eye-level or waist-level viewing, and the ability to switch quickly between the two. The optics are designed in such a way that the finder's image is visible up to 6 cm away from the eyepiece, enabling the photographer to use the finder even with glasses or goggles. The Speed Finder also has a hot shoe.
- Waist-Level Finder FN
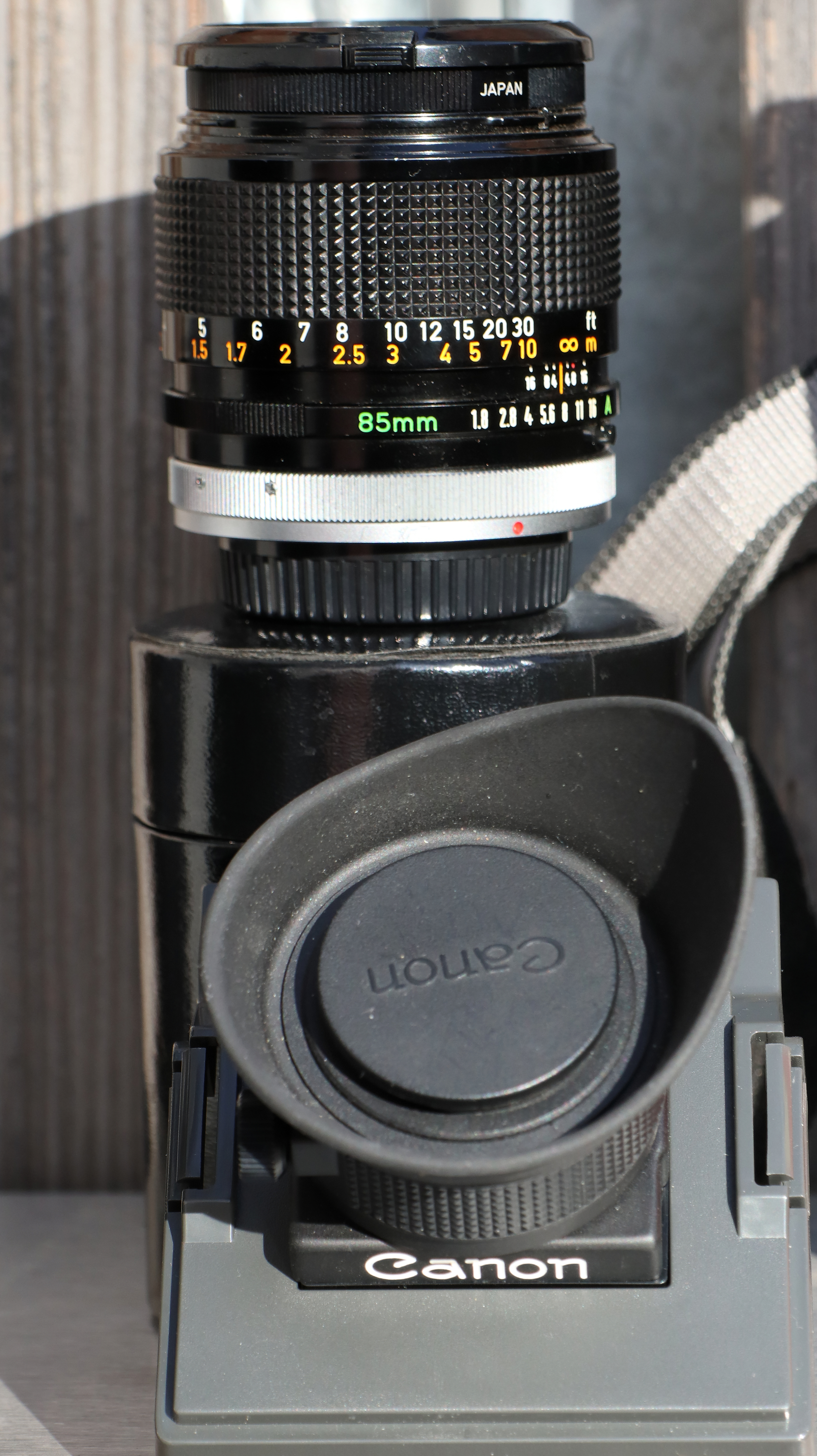
  Waist-Level Finder FN and FD 85 mm f/1.8 lens
- Waist-Level Finder FN-6X
  Both Waist-Level Finders are useful in situations which require use of a low angle, or for copy work, photomacrography, or astrophotography. The image is reversed left-to-right in the finder. The Waist-Level Finder FN has a collapsible barrel and a flip-up 4.6x magnifier, while the 6x model has a 6x magnified image, and an integral diopter adjustment.

=== Interchangeable focusing screens ===
The New F-1 system also has 13 different focusing screen styles, each of which has a variant for metering mode (either center-weighted averaging, selective (partial)-area, or spot, though not all are available with spot metering), for a total of 32 different screens.

The screens are named with a two-letter designation, the first indicating the metering type (A for averaging, P for partial-area metering, and S for spot metering), and the second indicating the style of screen, as listed below. For instance, the standard screen supplied from the factory in F-1 bodies is the Focusing Screen FN-AE (averaging metering, Type E "New Split/Microprism" style) for bodies shipped with an AE finder FN, and FN-PE (partial metering, new split/microprism style) for bodies shipped with an Eye Level Finder FN.

Canon focusing screens for F-1
Type	Metering			Image	Field	Center focusing aid	Notes
Type	A(vg)	P(art)	S(pot)	Image	Field	Center focusing aid	Notes
A	Yes	Yes	No		Laser matte Fresnel	Microprism spot, 3.5 mm dia.	"Standard Microprism": Suitable for general photography. Microprism angle 8°; base size 0.12 mm square.
B	Yes	Yes	Yes		Laser matte Fresnel	Split-image rangefinder spot (horizontal), 4 mm dia.	"New Split": Suitable for general photography. Split angles 5°40′ and 10°50′ on 0.012 mm pitch.
C	Yes	Yes	Yes		Laser matte Fresnel	[none]	"Overall Laser Matte": Suitable for general photography; ideal for macro and telephoto lenses.
D	Yes	Yes	No		Laser matte Fresnel	[none]	"Laser Matte with Grid": Includes etched grid of vertical and horizontal lines each 0.03 mm wide, spaced at 7 mm, otherwise similar to Type C.
E	Yes	Yes	Yes		Laser matte Fresnel	Split-image rangefinder spot (horizontal) with microprism collar, 5 mm dia.	"New Split/Microprism": Suitable for general photography. Combines Types A and B.
F	Yes	Yes	No		Laser matte Fresnel	Microprism spot, 3.5 mm dia.	"Microprism/Fast Lenses": Suitable for general photography with fast lenses (maximum aperture ≤ f/2.8), otherwise similar to Type A. Microprism angle 14°; base size 0.12 mm square.
G	Yes	Yes	No		Laser matte Fresnel	Microprism spot, 3.5 mm dia.	"Microprism/Slow Lenses": Suitable for general photography with slow lenses (maximum aperture ≥ f/3.5), otherwise similar to Type A. Microprism angle 4°; base size 0.12 mm square.
H	Yes	Yes	No		Laser matte Fresnel	Fine-ground matte spot	"Laser Matte with Scale": Includes horizontal (32 mm) and vertical (20 mm) scales ruled at 1 mm for scientific or close-up work, but can be used for general photography. Lines are 0.02 mm wide; includes grading along edges.
I	Yes	Yes	Yes		Laser matte Fresnel	Double cross-hair reticle, 5 mm dia.	"Laser Matte with Double Cross-Hair Reticle": Intended for high-magnification work; uses parallax focusing. Cross-hairs are 3 mm × 3 mm, spaced 0.04 mm apart; line width is 0.02 mm.
J	Yes	Yes	Yes		Bright laser matte	[none]	"Bright Laser Matte/Short Lenses": Intended for lenses with focal lengths of 50 to 200 mm.
K	Yes	Yes	Yes		Bright laser matte	[none]	"Bright Laser Matte/Long Lenses": Intended for lenses with focal lengths ≥ 300 mm.
L	Yes	Yes	No		Laser matte Fresnel	Double split-image rangefinder, 4 mm dia.	"Cross Split": Divides subject both horizontally and vertically. Split angle 8°.
M	Yes	Yes	No		Laser matte Fresnel	[none]	"A/B Size Laser Matte": Includes cross marks to indicate corners of A/B ISO paper sizes with 1.41:1 aspect ratio, spaced to cover an area 30.55 mm × 21.6 mm.

Replacing a screen is a simple operation. The finder is removed from the camera, and the screen is then pried up using a fingernail along the silver rear edge of the screen. The new screen is pressed into place, and the finder put back on.

=== Automatic film advance ===
There are two different motorized film advance units in the New F-1 system: the AE Power Winder FN, and the AE Motor Drive FN. The AE Power Winder FN allows up to 2 frames per second (frame/s) in continuous mode, and the AE Motor Drive allows up to 5 frame/s in high-speed mode and 3.5 frame/s in low-speed mode. Both units also have single-exposure mode, where only a single frame is exposed when the shutter release is held down. Both units also have a second shutter release for vertical format shooting, and a subtractive frame counter. Only the AE Motor Drive FN has a motorized film rewind (therefore when using the AE Power Winder FN it is not necessary to remove the Rewind Coupler cover from the bottom of the camera).

The AE Power Winder FN is powered by 4 AA batteries, and is a single self-contained, unexpandable unit. The AE Motor Drive FN is a more complete system, as it has 3 different battery packs to choose from: the Battery Pack FN, the Ni-Cd Pack FN, and the High Power Ni-Cd Pack FN. The Battery and High Power Ni-Cd packs will power the motor drive for up to 50 rolls of film, while the Ni-Cd pack provides power for up to 30 rolls. The Battery Pack FN takes 12 AA batteries. The two Ni-Cd packs have to be plugged into a charger to recharge them. The High Power Ni-Cd pack will also power the camera body itself by replacing the camera's battery with Battery Cord C-FN.

Both units add the possibility of shutter-priority auto exposure mode by setting the lens's aperture ring to 'A'. The aperture needle disappears from the meter display, and the meter needle indicates what aperture the AE system has selected. Also, using either of the motor drive systems also enables use of electronic interval timers and remote shutter releases, both wired and wireless.

=== Interchangeable backs ===
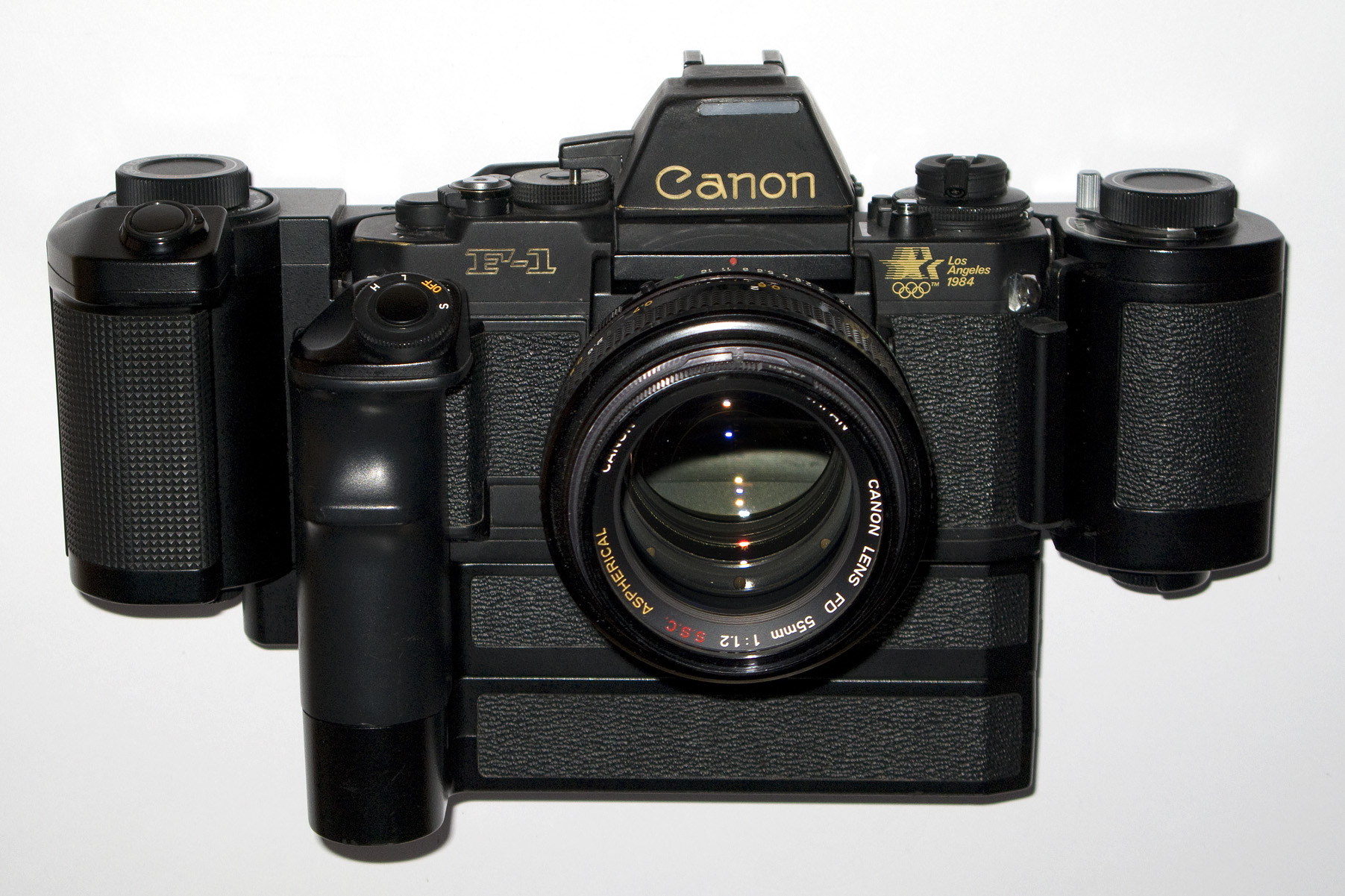
New F-1 with AE Motor Drive FN and Film Chamber FN-100

The standard camera back is also interchangeable with a couple other units. One is the Data Back FN, which has 3 dials with letters, numbers, and Roman numerals. The left-hand dial is labeled "Year", and has a blank, 0-9, 82-93, I-X, and a-g; the middle dial is labeled "Month", and has a blank, 0-31, and A-G; the right-hand dial is labeled "Day", and has a blank, and 0-31. The back imprints the dial settings onto the film for classification or dating purposes, either at the time of shutter release, or when the manual record button is pressed.

The Film Chamber FN-100 is a bulk film back which allows up to 100 exposures without reloading. It requires use of the AE Motor Drive FN.

== Special Editions ==
In addition to the standard version of the New F-1, Canon produced a few special editions of the camera.

=== Canon 50 years commemorative model ===
1983 Canon launched a commemorative model for its 50th anniversary. The model is a standard model with a golden Canon logo.

=== Swiss Post model ===
Canon delivered a few models for the Swiss Post with a fixed ALOS 35mm f/3.5 lens.

=== Los Angeles Olympics Edition ===
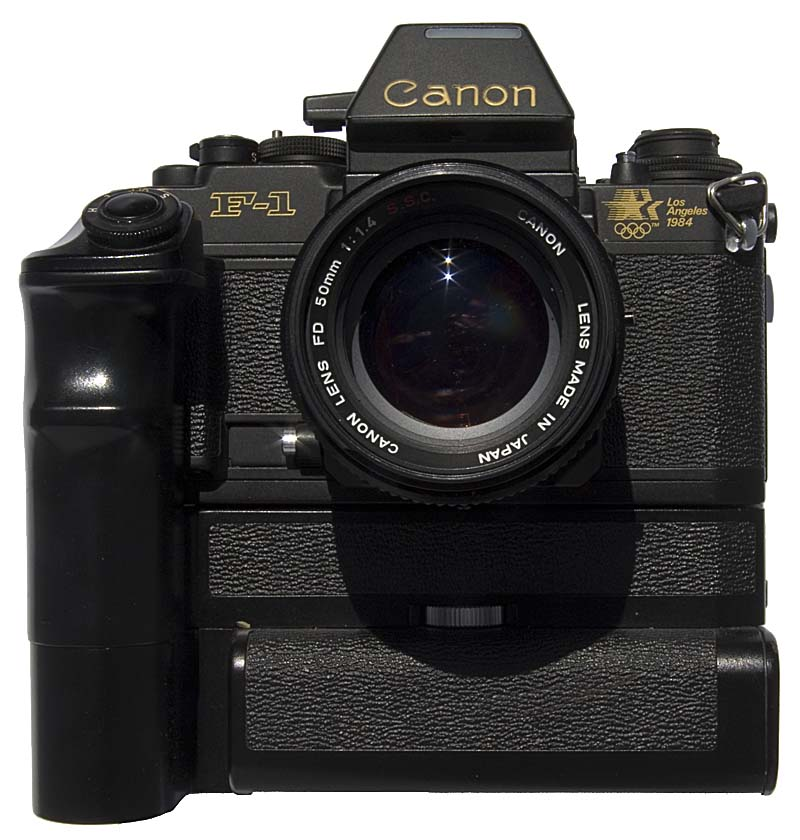
New F-1 Los Angeles Olympics Edition, with added Motor Drive/Power Pack FN and 50 mm f/1.4 lens.

Canon was the official camera sponsor of the 1984 Summer Olympics and produced a commemorative edition of the New F-1 for the occasion. This edition has gold instead of white for the 'Canon' and 'F-1' lettering on the camera, and a gold 1984 Summer Olympics emblem on the rewind side of the front. Both the AE Finder FN and Eye Level Finder FN were available. The Eye-level Finder FN Olympic editions are much more difficult to find now, presumably due to lower production compared to the AE Finder version.

=== New F-1 High Speed Motor Drive ===
Also constructed for the 1984 Summer Olympics was a high-speed camera for the sports photographers covering the event. This followed on from Canon's previous attempt at a high-speed sports photography camera, the F-1 High Speed Motor Drive camera, produced for the 1972 Winter Olympics held in Sapporo, Japan. This new camera attained a record 14 frames per second performance, achieved through the use of a fixed pellicle mirror instead of the normal moving mirror, a high-speed metal blade shutter, and a large and powerful motor unit and battery pack. It is estimated that under a hundred of these specialised cameras were constructed.

=== U.S. Navy model ===
Canon supplied a number of New F-1 cameras to the U.S. Navy. These were largely identical to the civilian models except for Navy markings.

== In popular culture ==
- In the 2002 film Spider-Man, Peter Parker is seen using the camera the moment he gets bitten by the radioactive spider. The camera also makes an appearance in the following two films in the franchise.

Also used by the reporter, Sue Charlton, in the film "Crocodile Dundee" (1986)

	1971	1972	1973	1974	1975	1976	1977	1978	1979	1980	1981	1982	1983	1984	1985	1986	1987	1988	1989	1990	1991	1992	1993
Professional																T90							
Professional		F-1 High Speed Motor Drive Camera												New F-1 High Speed Motor Drive Camera									
Professional	F-1						F-1N / F-1 (Later Model)					New F-1											
Amateur				EF					A-1														
Amateur															T70								
Amateur	FTb			FTb-N			AE-1					AE-1 Program											
Amateur					TLb					AV-1			AL-1			T80							
Amateur					TX		AT-1							T50							T60		
