= Canon EOS-1Ds Mark III =

2007 full-frame digital single-lens reflex camera

Canon EOS 1Ds Mark III
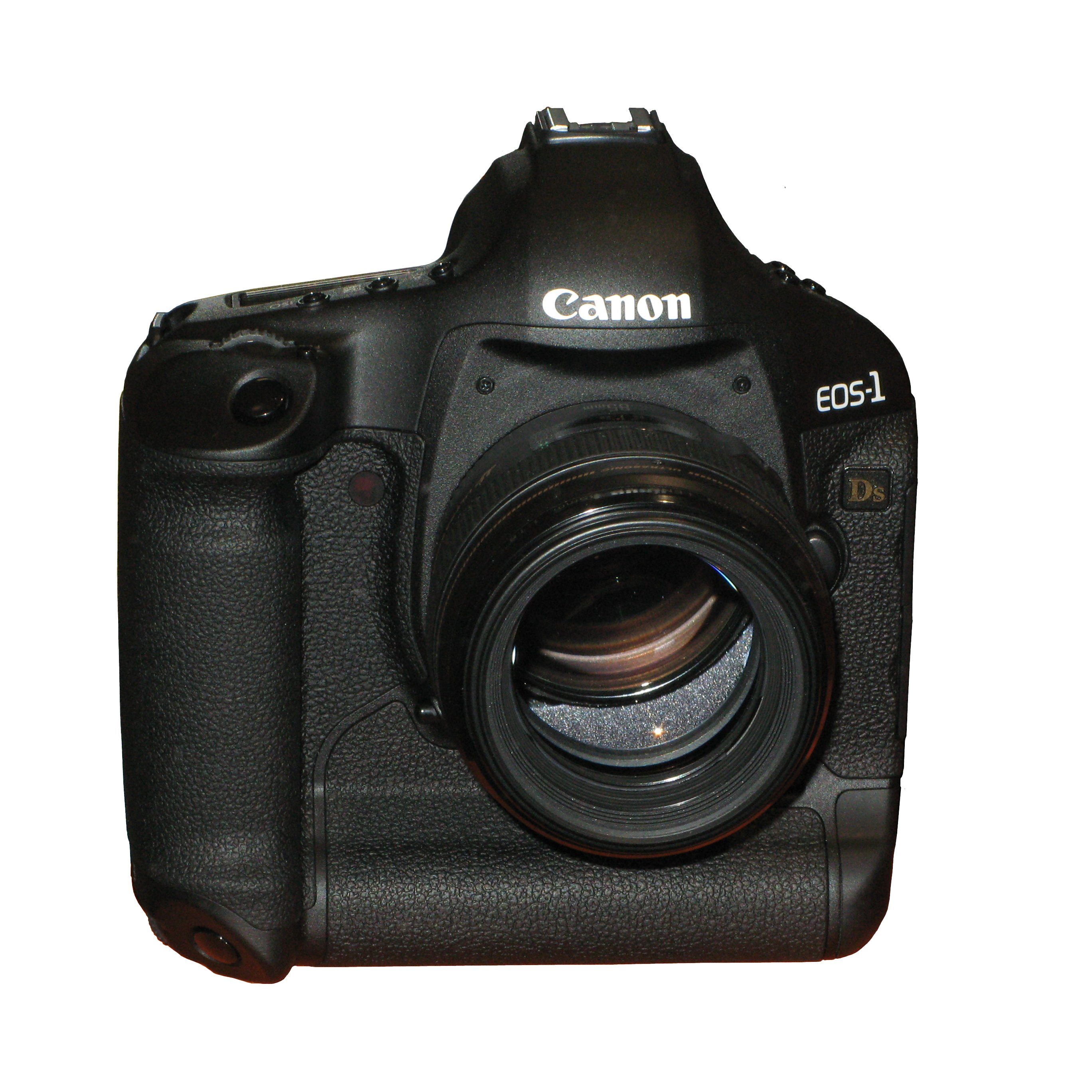

Overview
- Maker: Canon Inc.
- Type: Single-lens reflex
- Released: November 2007
- Intro price: $6999.00

Lens
- Lens mount: Canon EF
- Lens: Interchangeable

Sensor/medium
- Sensor: 36 mm × 24 mm CMOS
- Maximum resolution: 5,616 × 3,744 (21.1 effective megapixels)
- Film speed: 100–1600 in 1/3 stops, plus 50, 3200 as option
- Storage media: CompactFlash (Type I or Type II) and/or Secure Digital

Focusing
- Focus modes: One-shot, AI Servo, Manual
- Focus areas: 45-point (19 high-precision cross-type AF points plus 26 Assist AF points)

Exposure/metering
- Exposure metering: 63 zone metering linked to AF points
- Metering modes: 63 area eval, partial, spot (center, AF point, multi-spot), center-weighted average

Shutter
- Shutter: Electronically controlled focal-plane
- Shutter speed range: 1/8000 to 30 sec. (1/3-stop increments), bulb, X-sync at 1/250 sec.
- Continuous shooting: Approx. 5.0 frame/s

Viewfinder
- Viewfinder: Optical pentaprism
- Image processor: DIGIC 3

General
- LCD screen: 3.0 inch, 230,000 pixels
- Battery: lithium-ion battery pack
- Weight: 1,205 g (42.5 oz) (body only)
- Made in: Japan

Chronology
- Replaced: Canon EOS-1Ds Mark II
- Successor: Canon EOS-1D X

The EOS-1Ds Mark III is a digital SLR camera body by Canon designed for professional photographers. The Canon EOS 1Ds Mark III is successor to the EOS-1Ds Mark II and was announced in August 2007. The camera features a full-frame 21.1 megapixel CMOS sensor with 14-bit analog/digital converters for a total colour depth of 16,384 tones per subpixel. It features a three-inch (76 mm) LCD screen, capable of "Live View," and dual DIGIC III processors allowing it to shoot at up to five frames per second.

The EOS-1Ds features many technologies first seen in the Canon EOS-1D Mark III, such as the 63-zone exposure metering, 19 cross-type auto focus system, a 3.0" LCD with Live View mode and EOS Integrated Cleaning System.

It was discontinued in mid-2012 with the introduction of the Canon EOS-1D X, which replaced both the EOS-1Ds Mk III and the EOS-1D Mk IV.

== Features ==
=== Image quality ===
The EOS-1Ds Mark III features a 21-megapixel sensor. It has a higher pixel count than the 16.7 megapixel sensor seen in the Canon EOS-1Ds Mark II. The CMOS sensor incorporates a new pixel design with on-chip noise reduction circuitry. It can shoot in 3200 ISO when necessary. The 1Ds Mark III also features Highlight Tone Priority mode, which boosts the dynamic range for highlights.

=== Resolution ===
JPEG

- 5616 × 3744 (21.0 MP; 6.4 MB)
- 4992 × 3328 (16.6 MP; 5.2 MB)
- 4080 × 2720 (11.0 MP; 3.9 MB)
- 2784 × 1856 (5.2 MP; 2.2 MB)

RAW

- 5616 × 3744 (21.0 MP; 25.0 MB)
- 2784 × 1856 (5.2 MP; 14.5 MB)

=== Auto focus ===
The auto focus system includes 19 cross-type sensors at f/2.8, spread across the AF area. There are 26 more assist points. The camera features an AF-ON button.

=== LCD and live view ===
The back of the camera has a 3.0-inch (76 mm), 230K pixel LCD monitor, larger than the 2.0" display of the Mark II. Live View is a mode which uses this LCD as an electronic viewfinder, with optional grid overlay and histogram. When the camera is tethered to a computer this mode can be used to compose, adjust and capture images using software supplied with the camera.

=== Connectivity ===
The EOS-1Ds Mark III connectivity ports:

- USB 2.0
- Video Out
- N3 type wired remote
- PC sync flash terminal
- 802.11 wireless file transmitter (optional)

=== Compatibility ===
The camera is compatible with Canon's EF lenses and EX Speedlite flashes and WFT-E2 wireless file transmitter.

=== Software ===
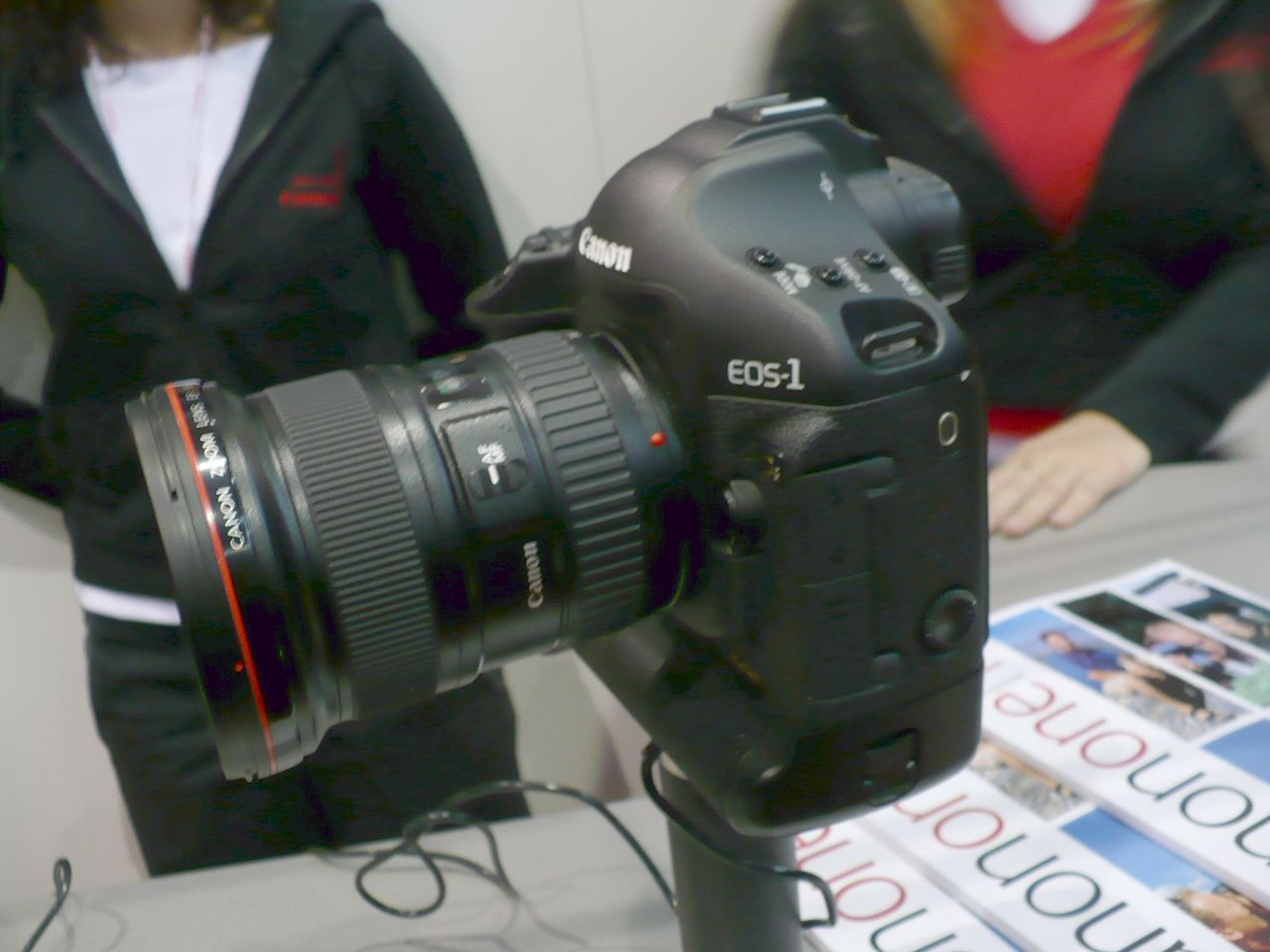
Canon EOS 1Ds Mark III with 16-35mm II lens

The collection of software packaged with the EOS-1Ds Mark III includes:

- Digital Photo Professional
- EOS Utility
- Images Browser/Zoom Browser
- Photostitch

==== Firmware update ====
Canon occasionally releases firmware updates that fix bugs in the camera's firmware. The updates are available from the Canon website. As of August 2017, the latest update is version 1.2.3. from 2013.

== Reliability ==
Canon has rated the shutter durability of the Canon EOS-1Ds Mark III and Canon EOS-1D Mark III at 300,000 cycles, significantly more than other EOS cameras. The 1Ds Mark III also has a new EOS Integrated Cleaning System that removes dust automatically. The camera is weather sealed against moisture. The camera beeps if the door is opened while images are being written.

As of 20 February 2008 there are reports of some cameras having misalignment between the image sensor and the viewfinder/prism assembly. Canon is reported to have acknowledged the problems and is correcting affected cameras.

Type	Sensor	Class	00	01	02	03	04	05	06	07	08	09	10	11	12	13	14	15	16	17	18	19	20	21	22	23	24	25
DSLR	Full-frame	Flagship				1Ds		1Ds Mk II			1Ds Mk III					1D C												
DSLR	Full-frame	Flagship				1Ds		1Ds Mk II			1Ds Mk III				1D X					1D X Mk II ^{T}			1D X Mk III ^{T}					
DSLR	APS-H	Flagship			1D			1D Mk II	1D Mk II N		1D Mk III		1D Mk IV															
DSLR	Full-frame	Professional																	5DS / 5DS R									
DSLR	Full-frame	Professional							5D			_{x} 5D Mk II			_{x} 5D Mk III					5D Mk IV ^{T}								
DSLR	Full-frame	Advanced														_{x} 6D					_{x} 6D Mk II ^{AT}							
DSLR	APS-C	Advanced											_{x} 7D					_{x} 7D Mk II										
DSLR	APS-C	Mid-range						20Da								_{x} 60Da ^{A}												
DSLR	APS-C	Mid-range		D30	D60	10D		20D	30D		40D	_{x} 50D		_{x} 60D ^{A}		_{x} 70D ^{AT}		80D ^{AT}					90D ^{AT}					
DSLR	APS-C	Mid-range																	760D ^{AT}		77D ^{AT}							
DSLR	APS-C	Entry-level					300D	350D		400D	450D	_{x} 500D	_{x} 550D	_{x} 600D ^{A}		_{x} 650D ^{AT}	_{x} 700D ^{AT}		_{x} 750D ^{AT}		800D ^{AT}			850D ^{AT}				
DSLR	APS-C	Entry-level															_{x} 100D ^{T}		_{x} 200D ^{AT}				250D ^{AT}					
DSLR	APS-C	Entry-level										1000D		_{x} 1100D			_{x} 1200D			1300D		2000D						
DSLR	APS-C	Value																				4000D						
Early models			Canon EOS DCS 5 (1995); Canon EOS DCS 3 (1995); Canon EOS DCS 1 (1995); Canon EOS D2000 (1998); Canon EOS D6000 (1998)																									
Type	Sensor	Spec																										
Type	Sensor	Spec	00	01	02	03	04	05	06	07	08	09	10	11	12	13	14	15	16	17	18	19	20	21	22	23	24	25
