= Canon EOS-1D Mark III =

2007 APS-H digital single-lens reflex camera

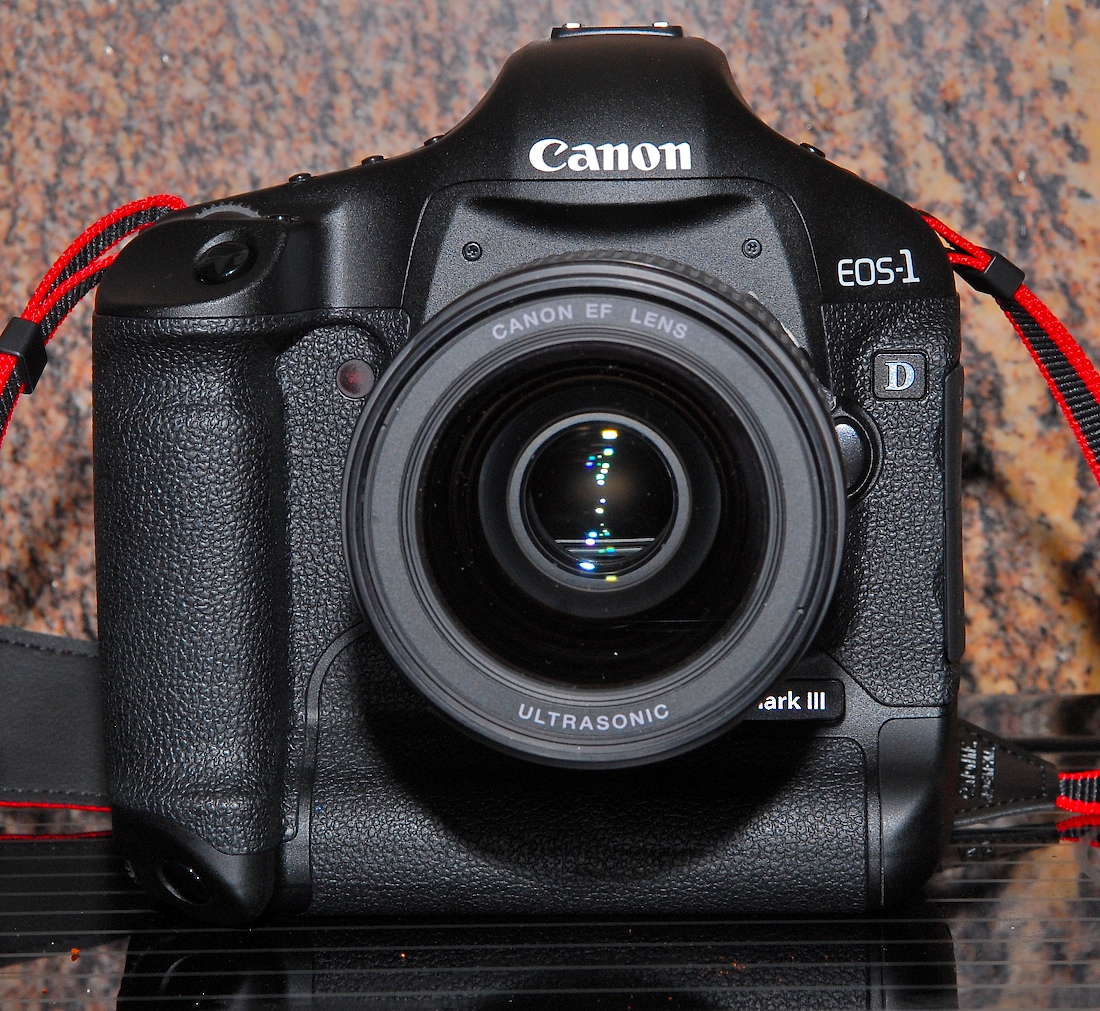

Overview
- Maker: Canon Inc.
- Type: Digital single-lens reflex
- Released: May 2007

Lens
- Lens mount: Canon EF
- Lens: Interchangeable

Sensor/medium
- Sensor: 28.1mm × 18.7mm (1.3x conversion factor); CMOS, APS-H Format (10.1 effective megapixels)
- Maximum resolution: 3,888 × 2,592 (10 million)
- Storage media: CompactFlash (Type I or Type II), Secure Digital, External Hard Drive or other USB Storage Devices.

Focusing
- Focus modes: Autofocus (One-Shot AF, Predictive AI Servo AF), Manual Focus (MF)
- Focus areas: 45 AF points (19 cross-type and 26 Assist AF points)

Exposure/metering
- Exposure metering: 63-zone TTL full aperture metering
- Metering modes: Evaluative metering (linked to all AF points), Partial metering (approx. 13.5% of screen, at center), Spot metering (approx. 3.8% of screen), Centerweighted average metering

Shutter
- Shutter: Vertical-travel, mechanical, focal-plane shutter with all speeds electronically controlled
- Shutter speed range: 1/8000 to 30 sec. (1/3-stop increments)
- Continuous shooting: 10frame/s up to 22/30/110 frames (raw+JPEG Large Fine/raw/JPEG Large Fine)

Viewfinder
- Viewfinder: Optical
- Image processor: DIGIC 3

General
- LCD screen: 3.0 in, 230,000 pixels (690,000 dots) TFT color, liquid-crystal monitor
- Made in: Japan

Chronology
- Replaced: Canon EOS-1D Mark II N
- Successor: Canon EOS-1D Mark IV

The EOS 1D Mark III is a professional 10.1 megapixel digital single lens reflex camera (DSLR) camera body produced by Canon. The EOS 1D Mark III was announced on February 21, 2007 and is the successor of the Canon EOS-1D Mark II N and was first released in May 2007. In late 2009, the camera was succeeded by the Canon EOS-1D Mark IV. One of the main benefits of the new Mark III, over the previous models, was the added functionality of Live view, allowing users to take pictures while looking at an LCD screen. While it had the same outdated software as the older 1D series cameras, it had a much improved button layout, which is still used today. It also had improved wireless capabilities (with the optional WFT-E2 wireless adapter) over the Mark II. The new WFT-E2 was much smaller than the previous WFT-E1 for the Mark II. The new transmitter could now also connect via a USB port. This allowed the optional addition of a GPS unit and wired PC connectivity.

== Features ==
- 28.1 × 18.7 mm APS-H CMOS sensor
- 10.1 megapixel effective
- Dual DIGIC III image processors
- Canon EF lens mount (excludes EF-S)
- 1.3x crop factor
- 45-point TTL-AREA-SIR autofocus with a dedicated CMOS sensor
- TTL full aperture metering with 63 zone SPC
- 100–3200 ISO speed equivalent (ISO can be expanded to L: 50 or H: 6400 with custom function)
- 30–1/8000 sec. shutter speed and bulb
- Auto white balance
- Eye-level pentaprism viewfinder with approx. 100% coverage
- 230,000 pixel (690,000 dot), 3.0" color TFT liquid-crystal monitor with approx. 100% coverage (for JPEG images)
- Live preview on the camera's rear LCD, also via an external system using Canons EOS Utility (disables AF)
- E-TTL II flash mode with optional in-camera controls for the Speedlite 580EX II flash
- 10 frames per second continuous shooting (JPEG: max. 110 frames, raw: max. 30 frames)
- Dimensions (WxHxD): 156 × 157 × 80 mm (6.1 × 6.2 × 3.1 in)
- Weight (body only): Approx. 1155 g
- Microphone for recording voice annotations

The camera's image sensor is a CMOS-based integrated circuit with Bayer filters for RGB color detection (Canon calls it single-plate, in contrast with three-CCD sensors). It has approximately 10.1 million effective pixels. A non-removable optical anti-aliasing filter is located in front of the image sensor, which also vibrates as part of an anti-dust mechanism (similar to the one used in the entry-level Canon EOS 400D).

The shutter is an electronically controlled focal-plane shutter. Its maximum speed is 1/8,000 of one second. The shutter is operated by an electromagnet.

The Mark III is Canon's first professional Digital SLR to include a Live View feature, usually reserved for point-and-shoot cameras. The image is displayed on an electronic screen instead of in the viewfinder alone.

== Awards ==
The European Imaging and Sound Association (EISA) named the Canon EOS 1D Mark III the "European Professional Camera of the Year 2007-2008".

== Problems ==
Issues about Mark III cameras were reported throughout the online photographer communities after the camera's retail launch. These relate to SERVO AF mode, to stripes within the picture, cursor navigation failure, Err 99 messages and sub par low light focus acquisition performance compared to previous models. Canon investigated a few of these issues, and some are believed to be resolved in firmware release 1.1.1, which was released in September 2007.

Most significant of the issues is the autofocus (AF) issue; under certain conditions, (notably warm, bright, sunny days, conditions under which AF usually operates the best) photographer Rob Galbraith has reported poor AF performance. As of October 17, 2007, Canon technical representatives began stating the widely reported auto focus issue is suspected to be caused by an internal submirror assembly that requires replacement on most Cameras with serial numbers between 501001 and 546561 This correction has been made in production models dating to sometime shortly before the announcement of the fix.

As of August 2008, some reviewers have continued to note some level of remaining problems with AF both in the EOS-1D Mark III and EOS-1Ds Mark III even after the hardware and firmware fixes noted by Canon.

On March 3, 2009, Canon announced new firmware and a free AF recalibration for the 1D Mark III. Initial reports from owners who have received their camera back from the AF recalibration seem to be largely positive, although there are still some mixed results.

== Firmware ==
This latest firmware available for the EOS-1D Mark III is version 1.3.2. The latest upgrades to the firmware for the Canon EOS-1D Mark III can be found on Canon's firmware download page.

== Photographs of camera ==
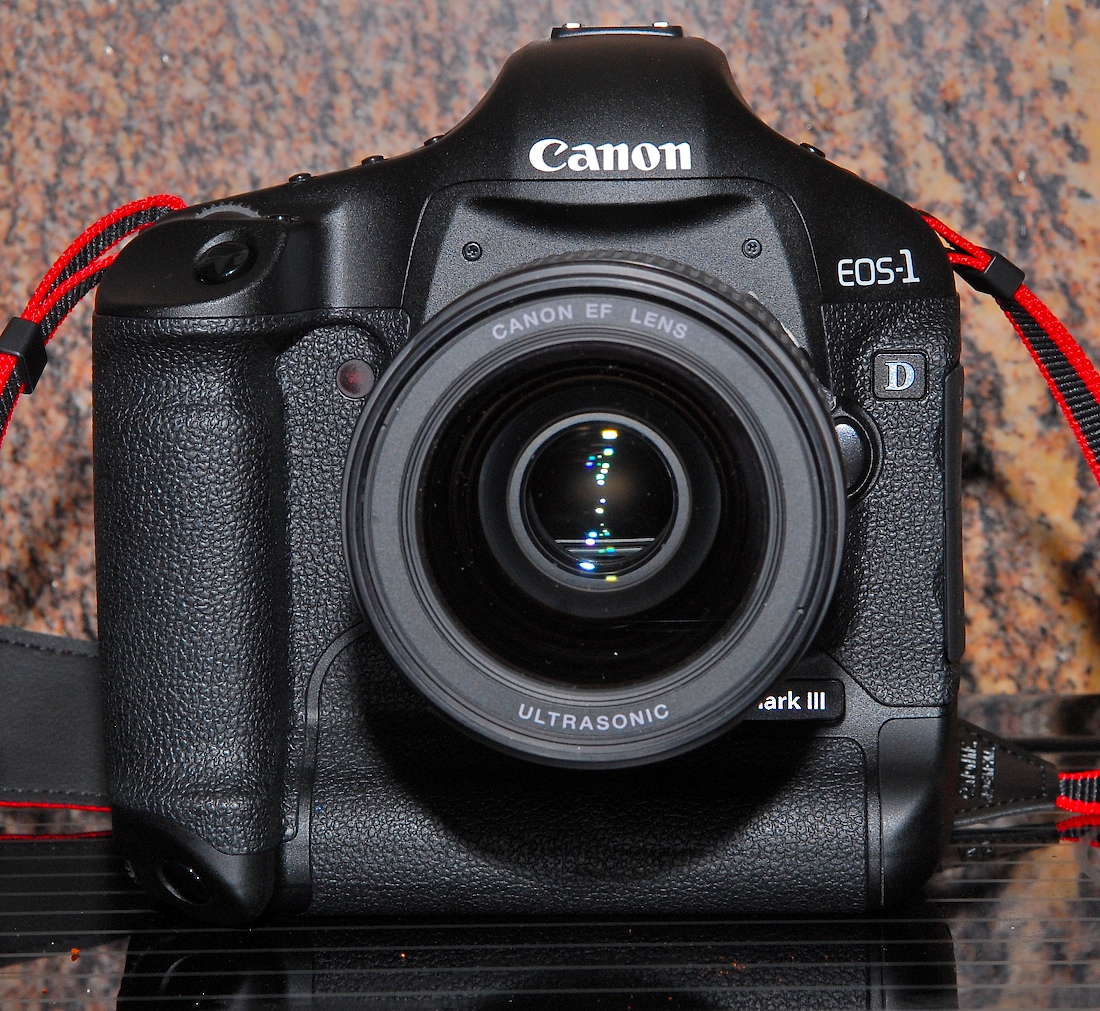

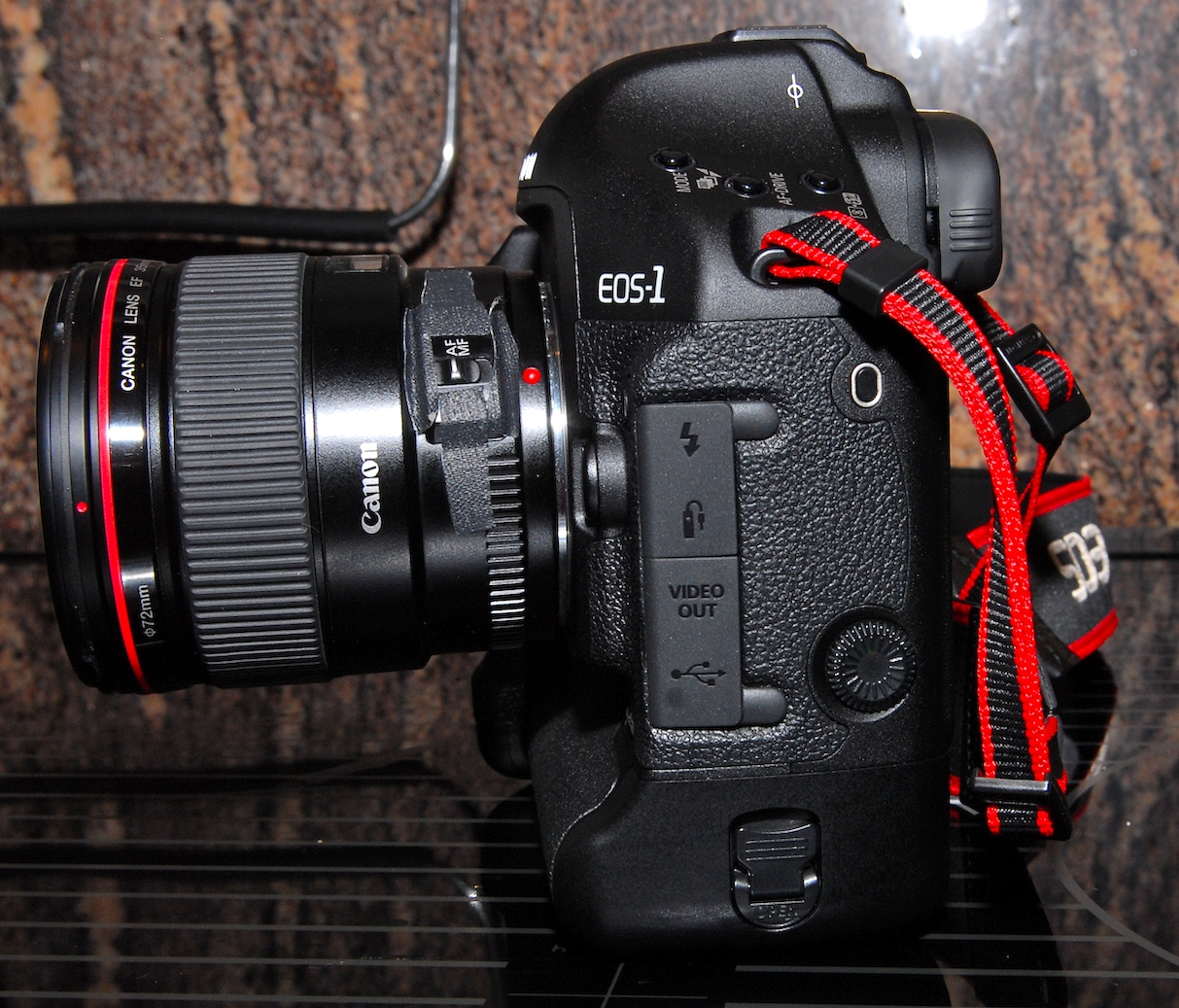

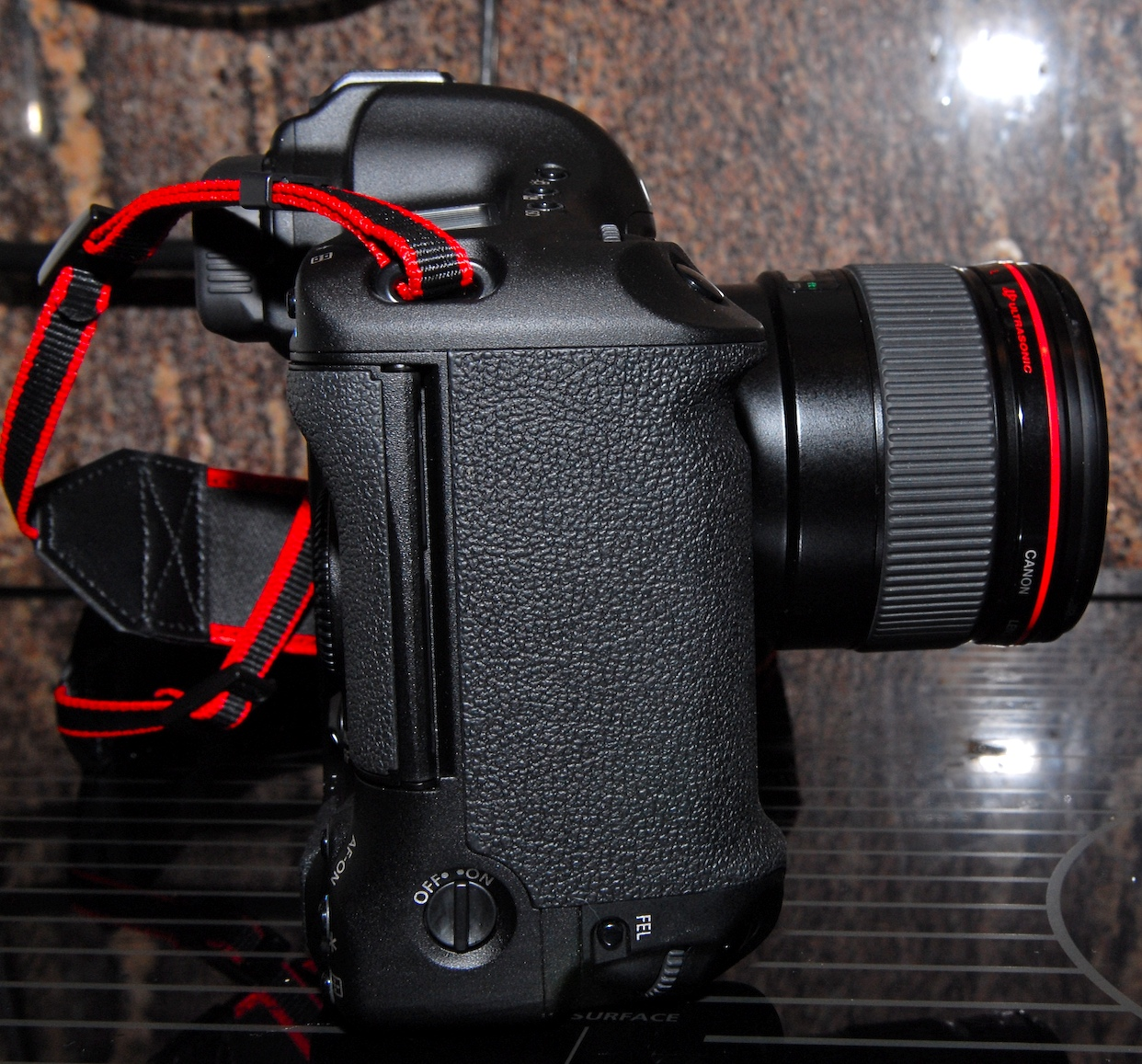

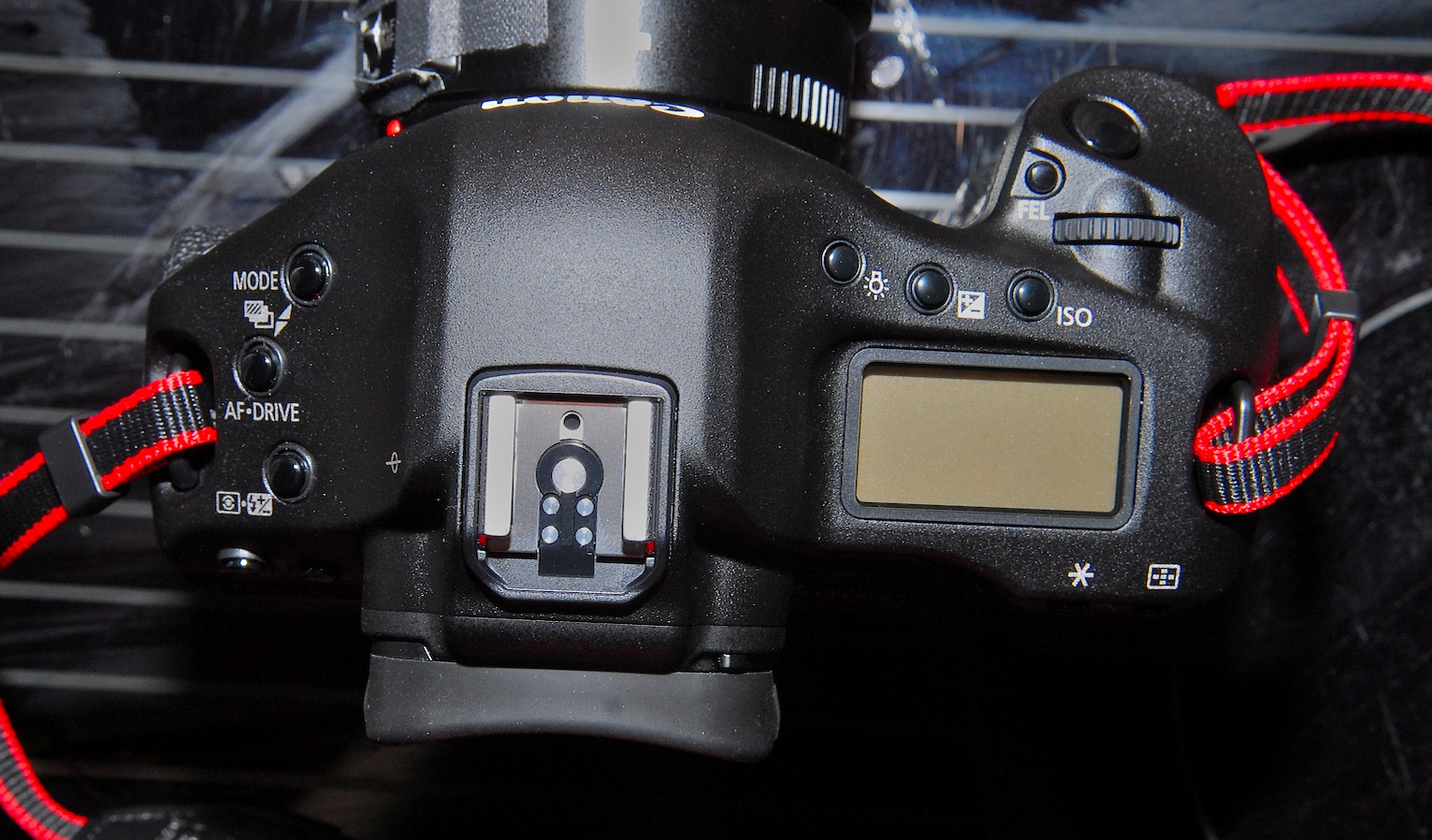

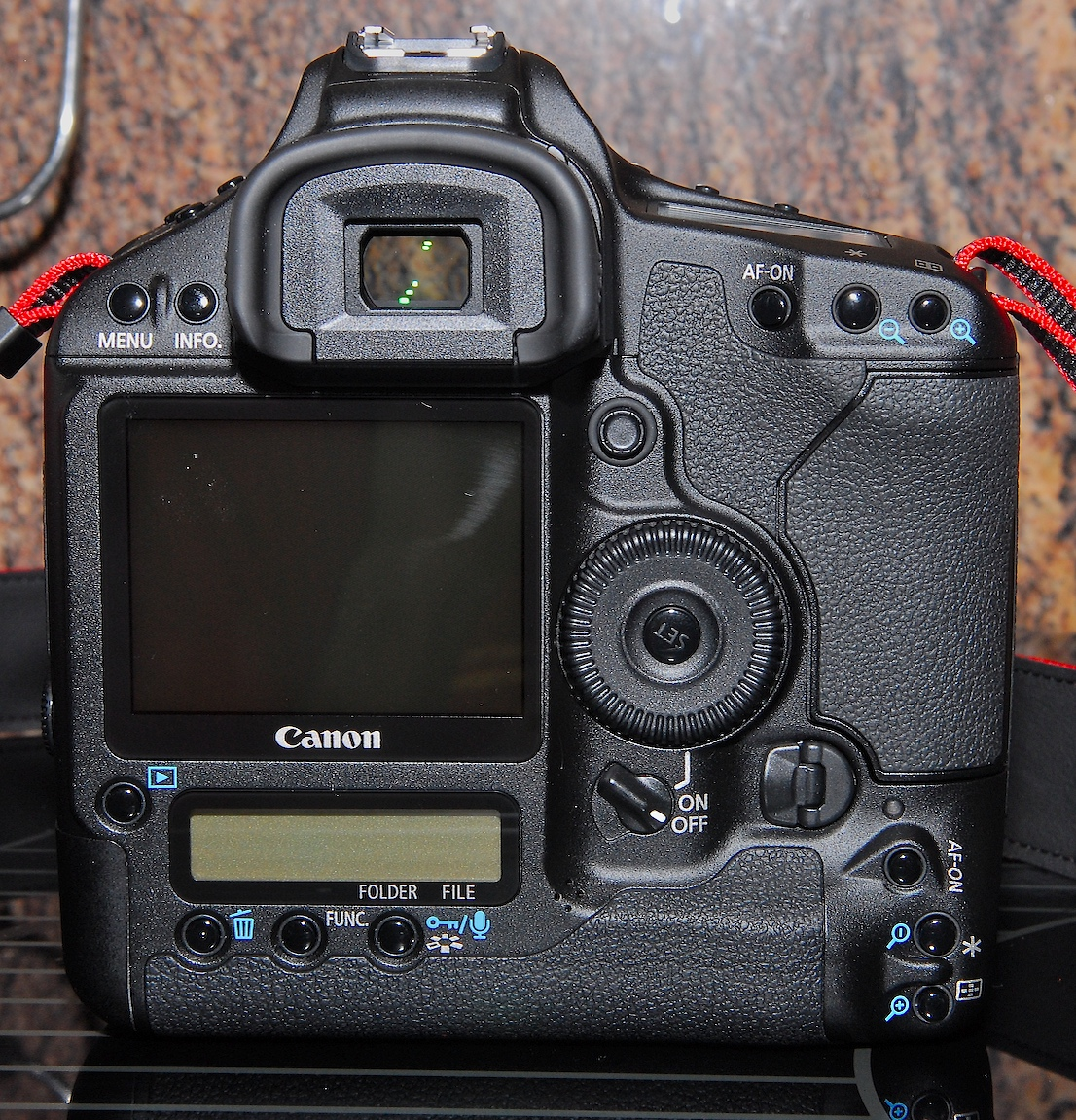

== See also ==
- Canon EF lens mount

Type	Sensor	Class	00	01	02	03	04	05	06	07	08	09	10	11	12	13	14	15	16	17	18	19	20	21	22	23	24	25	26
DSLR	Full-frame	Flagship				1Ds		1Ds Mk II			1Ds Mk III					1D C													
DSLR	Full-frame	Flagship				1Ds		1Ds Mk II			1Ds Mk III				1D X					1D X Mk II ^{T}			1D X Mk III ^{T}						
DSLR	APS-H	Flagship			1D			1D Mk II	1D Mk II N		1D Mk III		1D Mk IV																
DSLR	Full-frame	Professional																	5DS / 5DS R										
DSLR	Full-frame	Professional							5D			_{x} 5D Mk II			_{x} 5D Mk III					5D Mk IV ^{T}									
DSLR	Full-frame	Advanced														_{x} 6D					_{x} 6D Mk II ^{AT}								
DSLR	APS-C	Advanced											_{x} 7D					_{x} 7D Mk II											
DSLR	APS-C	Mid-range						20Da								_{x} 60Da ^{A}													
DSLR	APS-C	Mid-range		D30	D60	10D		20D	30D		40D	_{x} 50D		_{x} 60D ^{A}			_{x} 70D ^{AT}		80D ^{AT}				90D ^{AT}						
DSLR	APS-C	Mid-range																	760D ^{AT}		77D ^{AT}								
DSLR	APS-C	Entry-level					300D	350D		400D	450D	_{x} 500D	_{x} 550D	_{x} 600D ^{A}		_{x} 650D ^{AT}	_{x} 700D ^{AT}		_{x} 750D ^{AT}		800D ^{AT}			850D ^{AT}					
DSLR	APS-C	Entry-level															_{x} 100D ^{T}		_{x} 200D ^{AT}				250D ^{AT}						
DSLR	APS-C	Entry-level										1000D		_{x} 1100D			_{x} 1200D			1300D		2000D							
DSLR	APS-C	Value																				4000D							
Early models			Canon EOS DCS 5 (1995); Canon EOS DCS 3 (1995); Canon EOS DCS 1 (1995); Canon EOS D2000 (1998); Canon EOS D6000 (1998)																										
Type	Sensor	Spec																											
Type	Sensor	Spec	00	01	02	03	04	05	06	07	08	09	10	11	12	13	14	15	16	17	18	19	20	21	22	23	24	25	26
