= Canon EOS-1D C =

2012 full-frame digital single-lens reflex camera

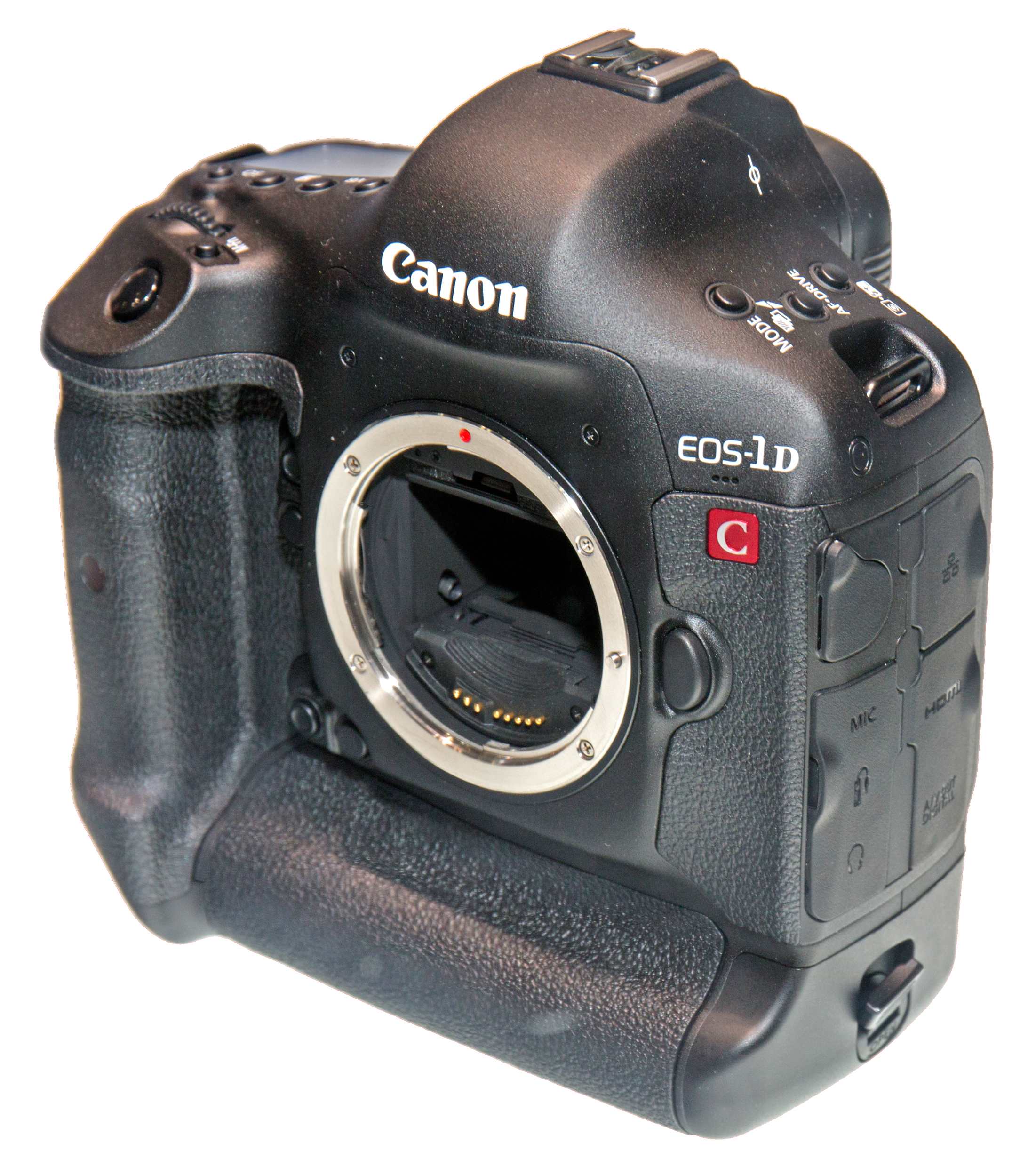

Overview
- Maker: Canon Inc.
- Type: Digital single-lens reflex
- Released: December 2012
- Intro price: $15,000.00

Lens
- Lens mount: Canon EF
- Lens: Interchangeable

Sensor/medium
- Sensor type: CMOS
- Sensor size: Full-frame (36×24 mm)
- Maximum resolution: 5184×3456 pixels (18.1 megapixels)
- Film speed: 100–51,200 in 1/3 stops. Expandable to ISO 50, 102,400 and 204,800.
- Storage media: Dual CompactFlash (Type I or Type II)

Focusing
- Focus modes: One-shot, AI Servo, Manual
- Focus areas: 61 autofocus points

Exposure/metering
- Exposure metering: 100,000 pixel RGB sensor, 0–20 EV, 252-zones

Shutter
- Shutter: Electromechanical carbon fiber focal-plane shutter. Selectable electronic 1st curtain shutter.
- Shutter speed range: 1/8000 to 30 sec. (1/3-stop increments), bulb, X-sync at 1/250 sec.
- Continuous shooting: 14 fps JPEG with mirror locked up. 12 fps RAW, JPEG, RAW+JPEG

Viewfinder
- Viewfinder: Fixed eye-level pentaprism
- Viewfinder magnification: 0.76×
- Frame coverage: 100%

General
- LCD screen: 3.2 inch 1,040,000-dot LCD
- Battery: LP-E4N lithium-ion battery pack
- Dimensions: 158×164×83 mm (6.2×6.5×3.3 in)
- Weight: 1,545 g (54.5 oz) (with battery)
- Made in: Japan

Chronology
- Predecessor: Canon EOS-1D X
- Successor: Canon EOS-1D X Mark II

The Canon EOS-1D C is an 18.1-megapixel CMOS digital single-lens reflex camera (digital SLR) made by Canon in the Cinema EOS range. It shares many features with the Canon EOS 1D X. It was publicly announced on April 12, 2012, and was released in March 2013 with suggested retail price of US$15,000 (body only). The Canon EOS-1D C is stated to be the world's first 4K resolution DSLR camera.

The 1D C has a full frame sensor but uses an APS-H-sized portion to record 4K resolution (4096 x 2160 pixels) video at 24p and 25p without downscaling in Y'CbCr 4:2:2 format. The pixel size of the sensor is 6.95 μm and records 4K in 8-bit 4:2:2 using Motion JPEG. The other modes in 8-bit 4:2:0, using MPEG-4 AVC/H.264 IBP or ALL-I format. Uncompressed video over HDMI up to 1080p is also possible.

In November 2013, Canon announced that the 1D C was the first DSLR to meet the European Broadcasting Union HD Tier 1 requirements for use in HD broadcast production.

In an interview in February 2016, Canon Product Manager Roger Machin announced that the 1D C would be succeeded by the 1D X Mark II; however, the 1D X Mk II lacks the unlimited recording, and log gamma found on the 1D C.

== Features ==
The Canon EOS-1D C can use more than sixty interchangeable Canon lenses, and features the Canon Log Gamma, by which an estimated preview of footage after grading helps the videographer with focusing and determining exposure whilst retaining maximum latitude in captured image data. An ISO setting range from 50 to 204,800 can be selected automatically or adjusted manually. The camera also allows the user to view the LCD screen while the HDMI port is in use on an external device and includes a headphone jack. The 1D C shares the same battery that is used in the EOS-1D X, the LP-E4N. Like all Canon DSLR full frame cameras, the 1D does not feature a built-in flash. EOS Utility and Picture Style Editor software is included in the purchase of the product which enables the user to adjust several settings from a computer. Like the Canon EOS 5D Mark III and Canon EOS-1D X, the camera features 61 autofocus points, which are assisted by a 100,000-pixel metering sensor. The camera's viewfinder has an estimated magnification of .76x and 100% field of view. Remote control from computer is possible using the built-in USB or Ethernet connector.

The camera can be operated remotely with a Canon WFT-E6A Wireless File Transmitter, allowing an external web enabled device to control the camera. The WFT-E6A Wireless File Transmitter unit also enables Bluetooth v2.1 +EDR, to embed GPS location data into files.

== Accessories ==
According to Canon's website, the EOS 1D C model comes equipped with:

- EOS-1D C Body
- Eyecup Eg
- LP-E4N Battery Pack
- LC-E4N Battery Charger
- Cable Protector and Clamp
- Stereo AV Cable (AVC-DC400ST)
- USB Interface Cable (model IFC-200U)
- Wide Camera Strap L7

== Known defects ==
Canon issued a product advisory indicating that in some units, due to insufficient lubrication within the camera's driving mechanism, "the autofocus searches but does not lock in on the subject" and "the image shown in the viewfinder is "blurry" or "not steady". Any bodies sold with the issue have been recalled by Canon.

== Other ==
On February 1, 2015, Canon reduced the price of the EOS-1D C model by $4,000 from the then current price of $11,999 to $7,999. On December 13, 2016, Canon reduced the price once again by another $3,000 from the then current price of $7,999 to $4,999.

== See also ==
- Canon EOS-1D X
- Canon EOS 5D Mark III
- Uncompressed video

	2012	2013	2014	2015	2016	2017	2018	2019	2020	2021	2022	2023	2024	2025
Standard							C700 FF							
Standard						C700								
Standard		C500							C500 MK II					
Standard													C400	
Standard	C300				C300 Mk II						C300 Mk III			
Standard							C200							
Standard													C80	
Standard		C100		C100 Mk II						C70				
MILC											R5C			
DSLR		1D C												

Type	Sensor	Class	00	01	02	03	04	05	06	07	08	09	10	11	12	13	14	15	16	17	18	19	20	21	22	23	24	25	26
DSLR	Full-frame	Flagship				1Ds		1Ds Mk II			1Ds Mk III					1D C													
DSLR	Full-frame	Flagship				1Ds		1Ds Mk II			1Ds Mk III				1D X					1D X Mk II ^{T}			1D X Mk III ^{T}						
DSLR	APS-H	Flagship			1D			1D Mk II	1D Mk II N		1D Mk III		1D Mk IV																
DSLR	Full-frame	Professional																	5DS / 5DS R										
DSLR	Full-frame	Professional							5D			_{x} 5D Mk II			_{x} 5D Mk III					5D Mk IV ^{T}									
DSLR	Full-frame	Advanced														_{x} 6D					_{x} 6D Mk II ^{AT}								
DSLR	APS-C	Advanced											_{x} 7D					_{x} 7D Mk II											
DSLR	APS-C	Mid-range						20Da								_{x} 60Da ^{A}													
DSLR	APS-C	Mid-range		D30	D60	10D		20D	30D		40D	_{x} 50D		_{x} 60D ^{A}			_{x} 70D ^{AT}		80D ^{AT}				90D ^{AT}						
DSLR	APS-C	Mid-range																	760D ^{AT}		77D ^{AT}								
DSLR	APS-C	Entry-level					300D	350D		400D	450D	_{x} 500D	_{x} 550D	_{x} 600D ^{A}		_{x} 650D ^{AT}	_{x} 700D ^{AT}		_{x} 750D ^{AT}		800D ^{AT}			850D ^{AT}					
DSLR	APS-C	Entry-level															_{x} 100D ^{T}		_{x} 200D ^{AT}				250D ^{AT}						
DSLR	APS-C	Entry-level										1000D		_{x} 1100D			_{x} 1200D			1300D		2000D							
DSLR	APS-C	Value																				4000D							
Early models			Canon EOS DCS 5 (1995); Canon EOS DCS 3 (1995); Canon EOS DCS 1 (1995); Canon EOS D2000 (1998); Canon EOS D6000 (1998)																										
Type	Sensor	Spec																											
Type	Sensor	Spec	00	01	02	03	04	05	06	07	08	09	10	11	12	13	14	15	16	17	18	19	20	21	22	23	24	25	26
