= Canon EOS-1D Mark IV =

2009 APS-H digital single-lens reflex camera

Canon EOS 1D Mark IV
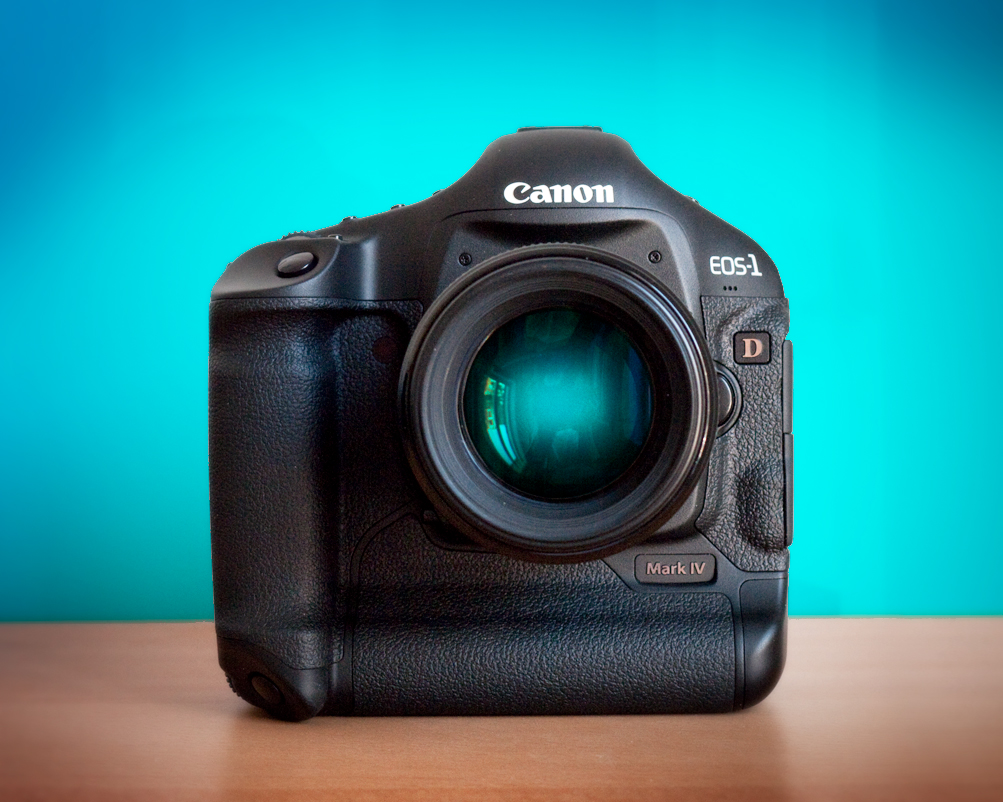

Overview
- Maker: Canon Inc.
- Type: Digital single-lens reflex
- Released: December 2009
- Intro price: US$4999.00

Lens
- Lens mount: Canon EF
- Lens: Interchangeable

Sensor/medium
- Sensor: 27.9mm × 18.6mm (1.3x conversion factor); CMOS, APS-H Format (16.1 effective megapixels)
- Maximum resolution: 4896 × 3264 (16.0 recorded megapixels)
- Storage media: CompactFlash (Type I or Type II), Secure Digital 32 GB Max

Focusing
- Focus modes: Autofocus (One-Shot AF, Predictive AI Servo AF), Manual Focus (MF)
- Focus areas: 45 AF points with 39 cross-type AF points

Exposure/metering
- Exposure metering: 63-zone TTL full aperture metering
- Metering modes: Evaluative metering, Partial metering, Spot metering, Centerweighted average metering

Shutter
- Shutter: Vertical-travel, mechanical, focal-plane shutter with all speeds electronically controlled
- Shutter speed range: 1/8000 to 30 sec. (1/3-stop increments) and bulb
- Continuous shooting: 10fps up to 28/121 frames (raw/JPEG Large Fine)

Viewfinder
- Viewfinder: 100% coverage optical pentaprism

General
- LCD screen: 3.0 in, 920,000 dots TFT color, liquid-crystal monitor
- Weight: 1,180 g (42 oz)
- Made in: Japan

Chronology
- Replaced: Canon EOS-1D Mark III
- Successor: Canon EOS-1D X

The EOS-1D Mark IV is a professional 16.1 effective megapixels digital single lens reflex camera (DSLR) camera body produced by Canon. The EOS-1D Mark IV is the successor of the Canon EOS-1D Mark III and was announced on 20 October 2009, just four days after Nikon announced the D3s. It used to be the only Canon APS-H format DSLR to feature HD video recording at 1080p resolution.

It was discontinued in mid-2012 with the introduction of the Canon EOS-1D X, which replaced both the EOS-1D Mk IV and the EOS-1Ds Mk III.

It received a Gold Award from Digital Photography Review.

== Features ==
- 27.9mm × 18.6mm; 16.1 effective megapixels APS-H CMOS sensor
- Dual DIGIC 4 image processors
- Canon EF lens mount (excludes EF-S)
- New autofocus module (45 AF points with 39 cross-type AF points)
- Integrated sensor cleaning system
- 1.3× crop factor
- 100–12800 ISO speed equivalent (expandable to L: 50, H1: 25600, H2: 51200 or H3: 102400)
- 30–1/8000 sec. shutter speed and bulb
- Shutter unit tested to 300,000 cycles
- Auto Lighting Optimizer
- Magnesium Alloy weather sealed body
- Eye-level pentaprism viewfinder with approx. 100% coverage at 0.76× magnification
- Live preview mode
- 3.0 in, 920,000 dots Clear View II TFT color, liquid-crystal monitor with 160° viewing angle
- 10 frames per second continuous shooting (Large JPEG: max. 121 frames, raw: max. 28 frames)
- Dimensions (W×H×D): 156 × 156.6 × 89.9 mm

== See also ==
- Canon EF lens mount

Type	Sensor	Class	00	01	02	03	04	05	06	07	08	09	10	11	12	13	14	15	16	17	18	19	20	21	22	23	24	25
DSLR	Full-frame	Flagship				1Ds		1Ds Mk II			1Ds Mk III					1D C												
DSLR	Full-frame	Flagship				1Ds		1Ds Mk II			1Ds Mk III				1D X					1D X Mk II ^{T}			1D X Mk III ^{T}					
DSLR	APS-H	Flagship			1D			1D Mk II	1D Mk II N		1D Mk III		1D Mk IV															
DSLR	Full-frame	Professional																	5DS / 5DS R									
DSLR	Full-frame	Professional							5D			_{x} 5D Mk II			_{x} 5D Mk III					5D Mk IV ^{T}								
DSLR	Full-frame	Advanced														_{x} 6D					_{x} 6D Mk II ^{AT}							
DSLR	APS-C	Advanced											_{x} 7D					_{x} 7D Mk II										
DSLR	APS-C	Mid-range						20Da								_{x} 60Da ^{A}												
DSLR	APS-C	Mid-range		D30	D60	10D		20D	30D		40D	_{x} 50D		_{x} 60D ^{A}		_{x} 70D ^{AT}		80D ^{AT}					90D ^{AT}					
DSLR	APS-C	Mid-range																	760D ^{AT}		77D ^{AT}							
DSLR	APS-C	Entry-level					300D	350D		400D	450D	_{x} 500D	_{x} 550D	_{x} 600D ^{A}		_{x} 650D ^{AT}	_{x} 700D ^{AT}		_{x} 750D ^{AT}		800D ^{AT}			850D ^{AT}				
DSLR	APS-C	Entry-level															_{x} 100D ^{T}		_{x} 200D ^{AT}				250D ^{AT}					
DSLR	APS-C	Entry-level										1000D		_{x} 1100D			_{x} 1200D			1300D		2000D						
DSLR	APS-C	Value																				4000D						
Early models			Canon EOS DCS 5 (1995); Canon EOS DCS 3 (1995); Canon EOS DCS 1 (1995); Canon EOS D2000 (1998); Canon EOS D6000 (1998)																									
Type	Sensor	Spec																										
Type	Sensor	Spec	00	01	02	03	04	05	06	07	08	09	10	11	12	13	14	15	16	17	18	19	20	21	22	23	24	25
