= Canon EOS-1D Mark II =

2004 APS-H digital single-lens reflex camera

Canon EOS 1D Mark II Canon EOS 1D Mark II N
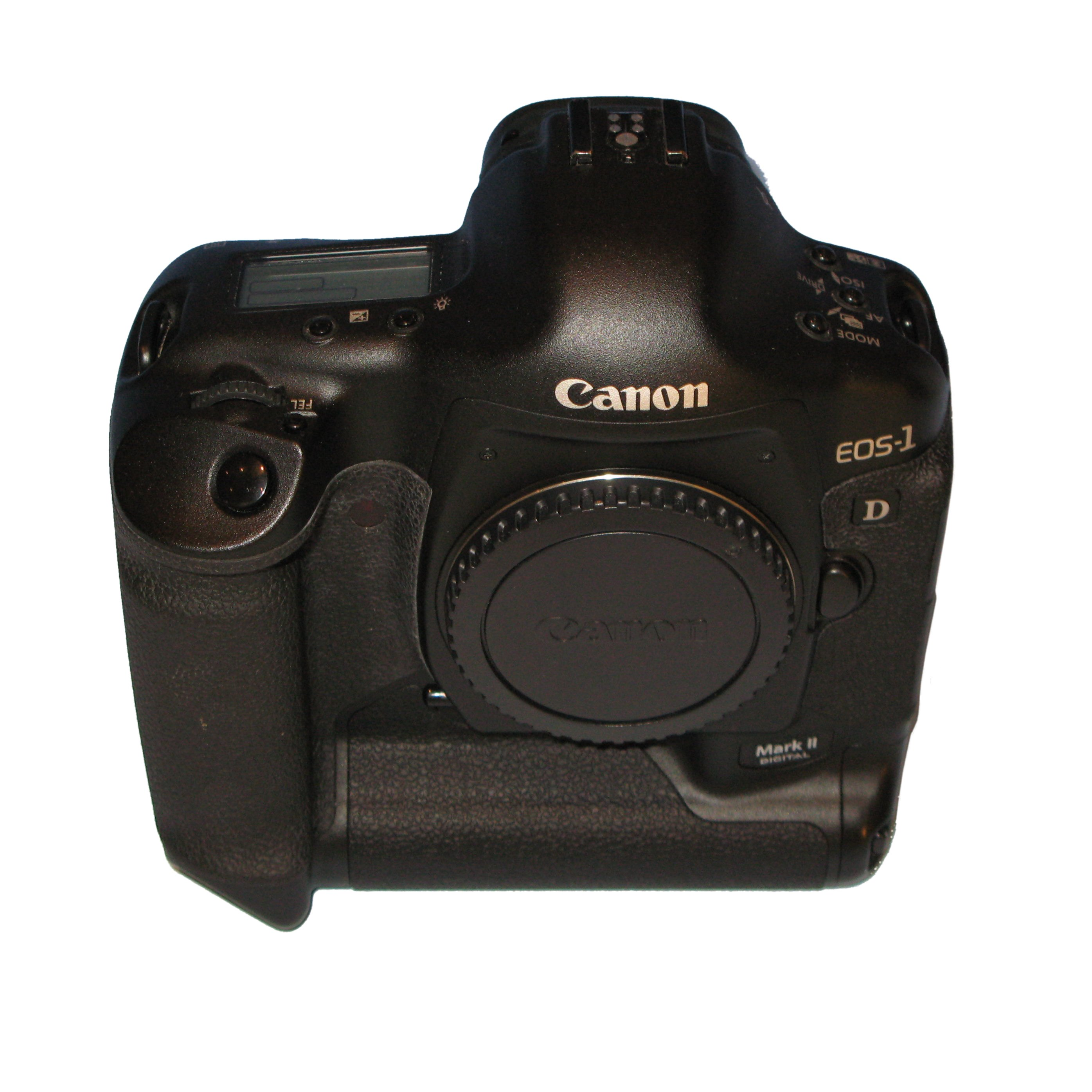

Overview
- Maker: Canon Inc.
- Type: Single-lens reflex
- Released: April 2004

Lens
- Lens mount: Canon EF
- Lens: Interchangeable

Sensor/medium
- Sensor: CMOS
- Maximum resolution: 3,504 × 2,336 (8 million)
- Storage media: CompactFlash (Type I or Type II) or Secure Digital / max CF:8GB SD:2GB (This can be fixed with Firmware Version 1.2.6.)

Viewfinder
- Viewfinder: Optical

General
- Made in: Japan

Chronology
- Replaced: Canon EOS-1D
- Successor: Canon EOS-1D Mark III

The EOS 1D Mark II is a professional 8.2 megapixel digital single lens reflex camera (DSLR) camera body produced by Canon. The EOS 1D Mark II was the successor of the EOS 1D and was itself replaced by the Canon EOS-1D Mark III in 2007. It was Canon's first dual-card slot EOS camera with one CF slot and one SD slot that was meant easily to use two dominant card types and have an assurance that once a small sized primary and faster CF slot is full, camera can be used to take photographs when recording was continued on secondary and slower card in critical moment. It also now had wireless capabilities. When paired with the new Canon WFT-E1, you could transfer images to a PC using an FTP server.

== Features ==
The EOS 1D Mark II features:

- 28.7 × 19.1mm (APS-H) CMOS sensor
- 8.2 megapixel effective (8.5 megapixel total)
- DIGIC II image processor
- Canon EF lens mount (excludes EF-S)
- 1.3x crop factor
- 45-point TTL-AREA-SIR autofocus with a dedicated CMOS sensor
- TTL full aperture metering with 21 zone SPC
- 100–1600 ISO speed equivalent (ISO can be expanded to L: 50 or H: 3200 with custom function)
- 30–1/8000 sec. shutter speed and bulb
- Auto white balance
- Eye-level pentaprism viewfinder with approx. 100% coverage
- 230,000 pixel, 2.0" color TFT liquid-crystal monitor with approx. 100% coverage (for JPEG images)
- E-TTL II flash mode
- 8.5 frames per second continuous shooting (JPEG: max. 40 frames, raw: max. 20 frames)
- Dimensions (WxHxD): 156 × 158 × 80 mm (6.1 × 6.2 × 3.1 in)
- Weight (body only): Approx. 1220 g
- Battery: Canon NP-E3 NiMH: 12v 1650mAh 300 g
- Microphone for recording voice annotations
- Shutter lag 40ms

The camera's image sensor is a CMOS-based integrated circuit. It has approximately 8.5 million total pixel sensors in a Bayer filter pattern. A non-removable anti-aliasing filter (optical low-pass filter) is located in front of the image sensor.

The shutter is an electronically controlled focal-plane shutter. Its maximum speed is 1/8000 second. Soft-touch shutter release occurs via an electromagnetic signal.

== EOS-1D Mark II N ==
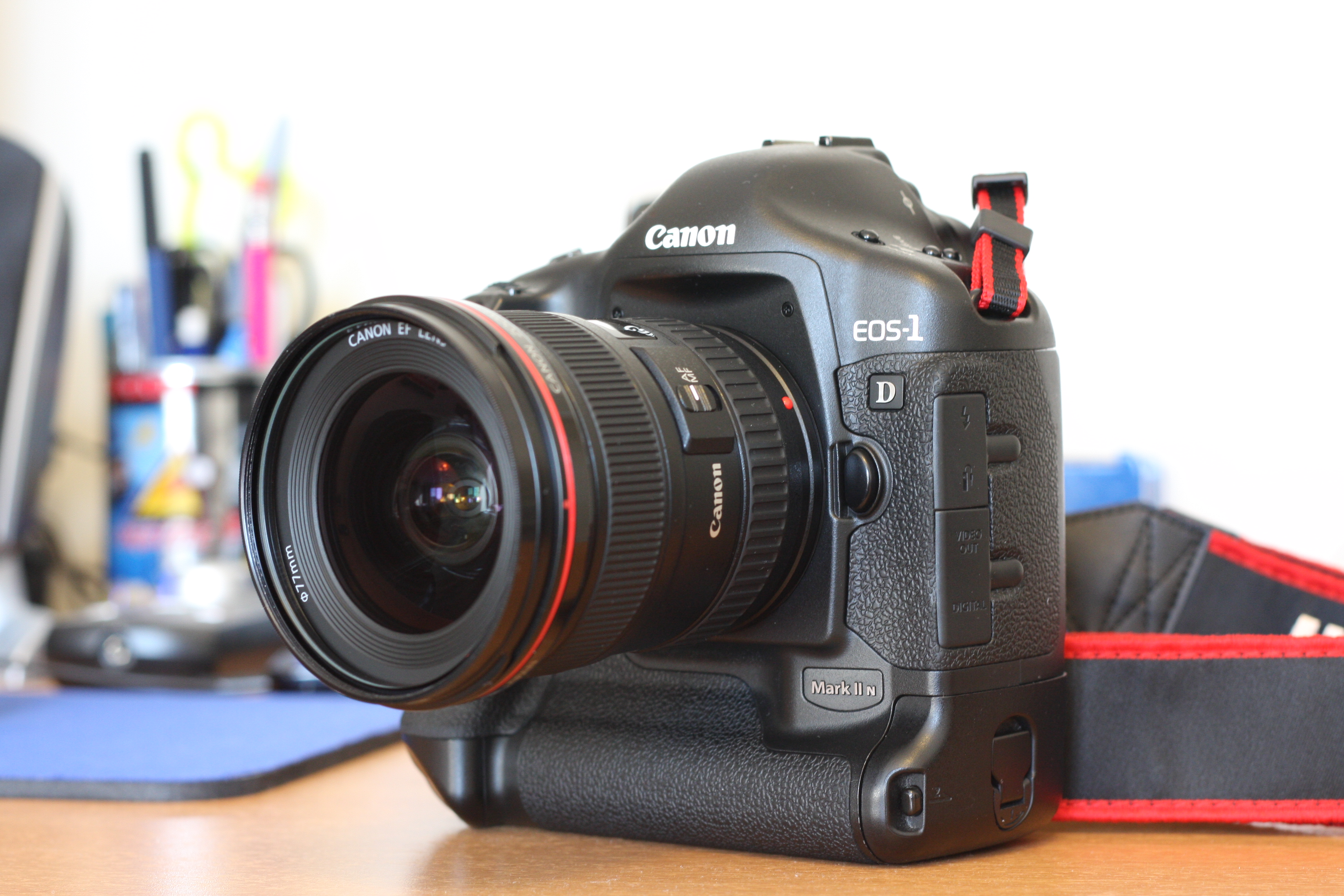
1D Mark II N

On August 22, 2005, Canon announced the successor to the EOS 1D Mark II. The new Canon EOS-1D Mark II N features the same 8.2 megapixel CMOS sensor, DIGIC II image processor and 8.5 frame per second shooting speed of its predecessor. The primary changes are a new 2.5" wide viewing angle LCD monitor, Evaluative Metering, an improved buffer, and new 'Picture Style' image parameters.

== Users ==
- Director Tim Burton on the stop-motion animation film Corpse Bride (2005)
- James Nachtwey
- Phil Martin

== Gallery ==
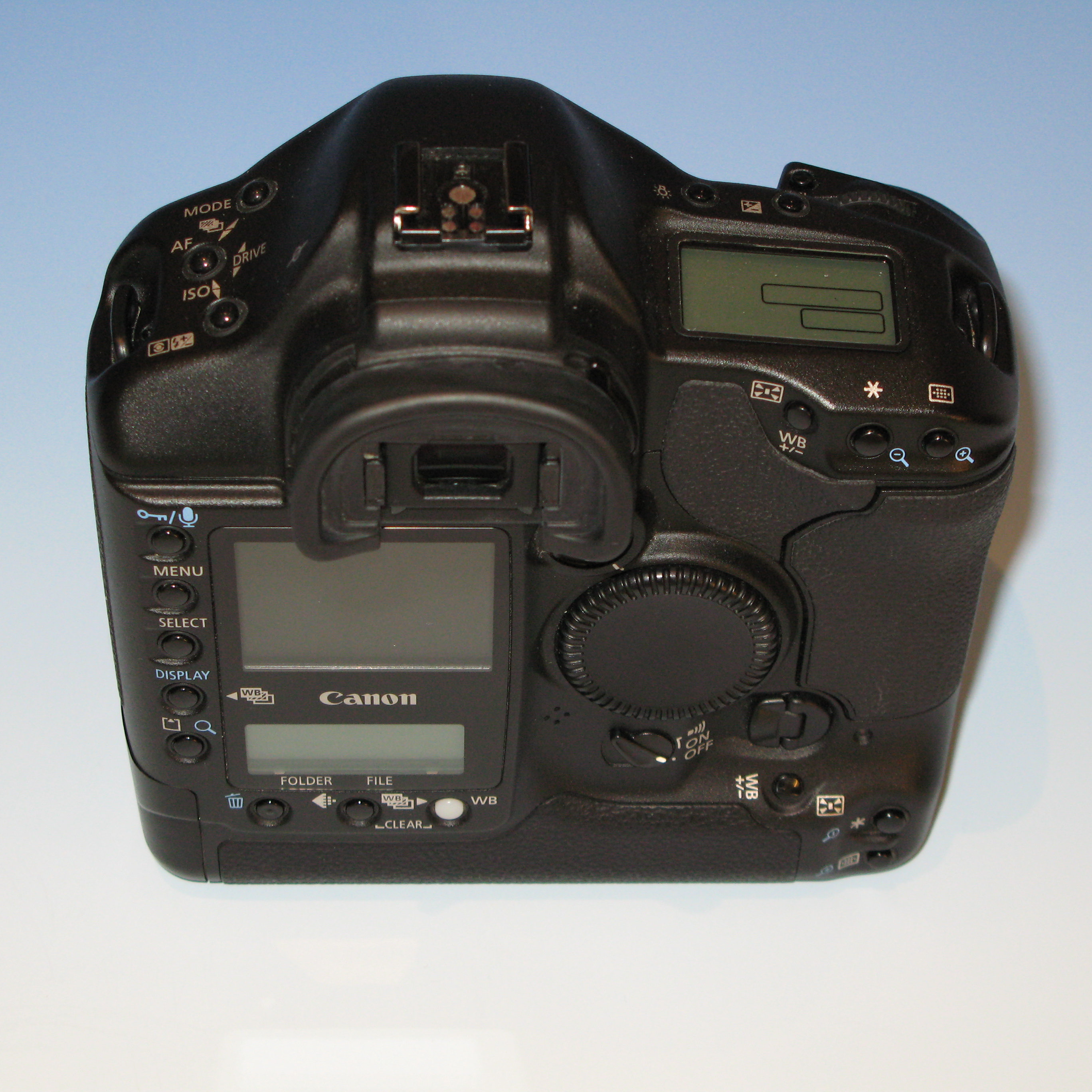
back of the camera

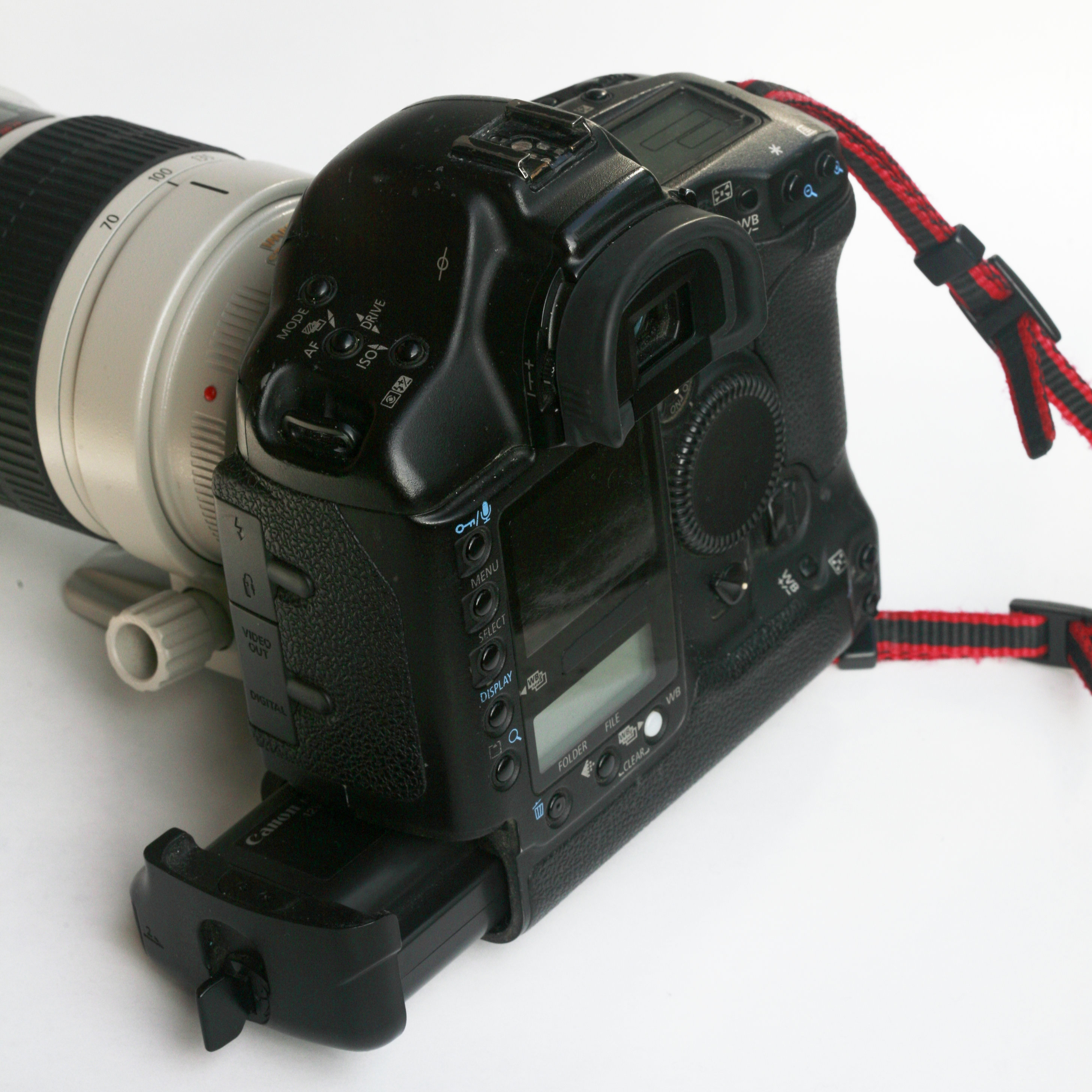
battery pack

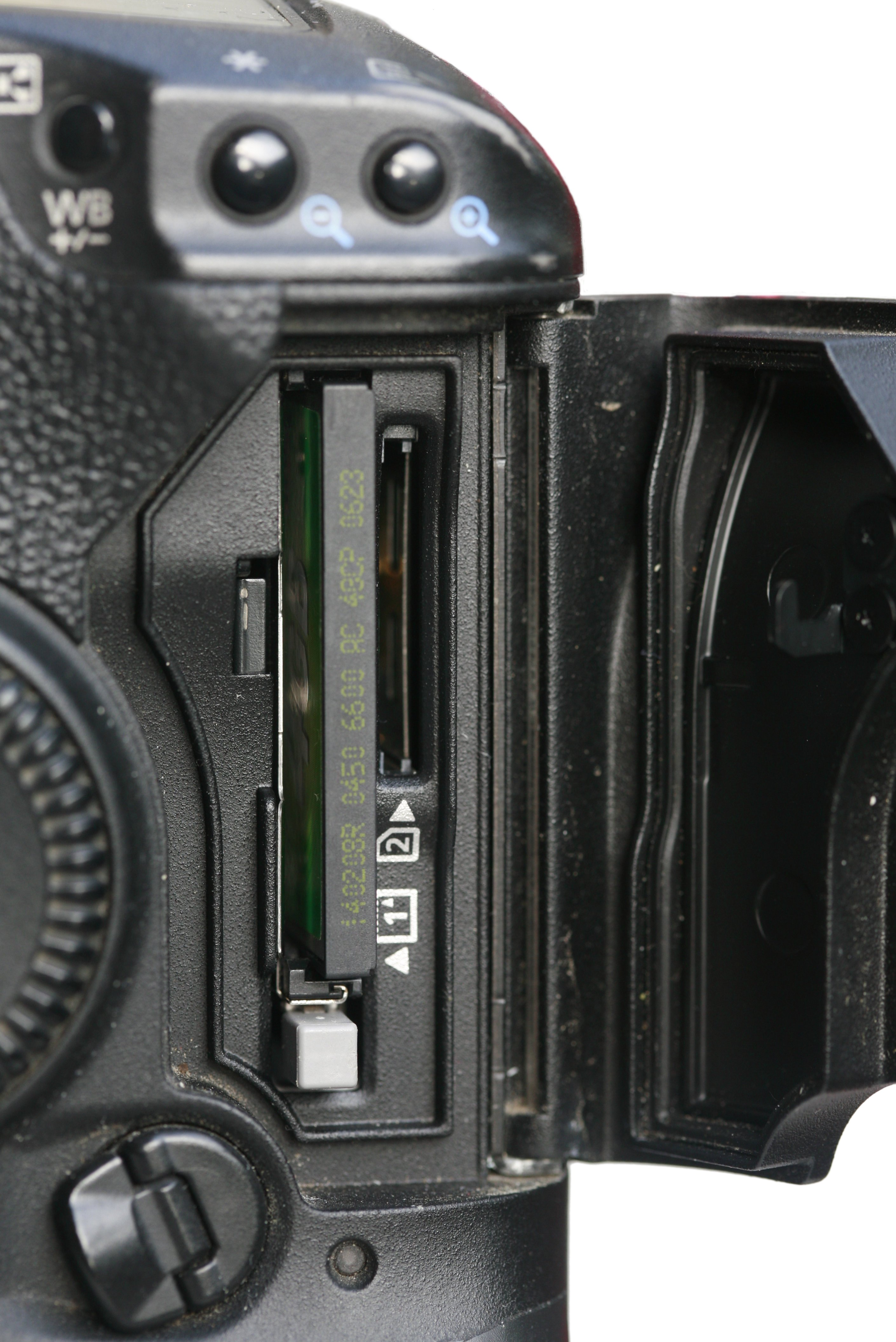
Memory card slots for Compact Flash and Secure Digital

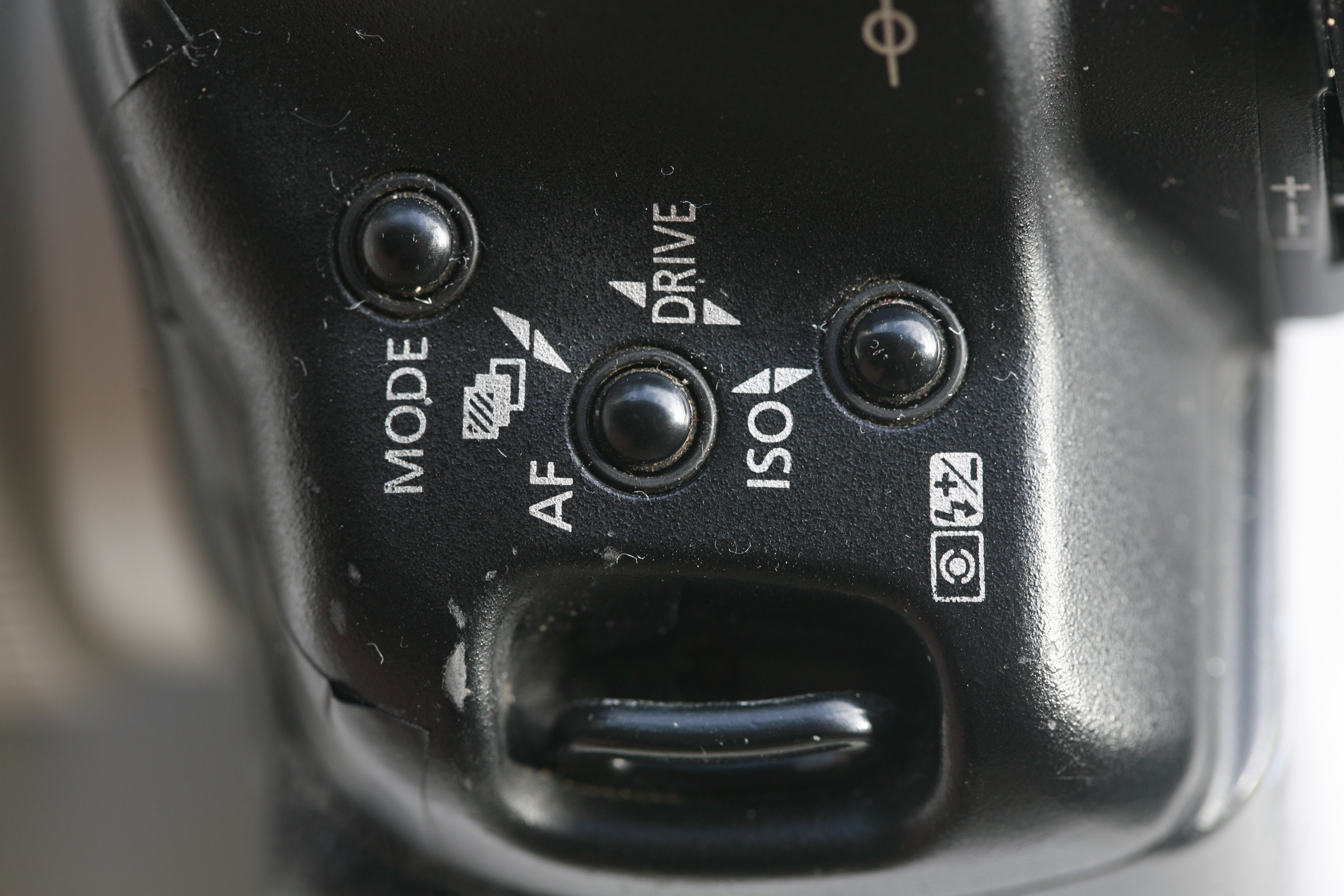
Mode selectors

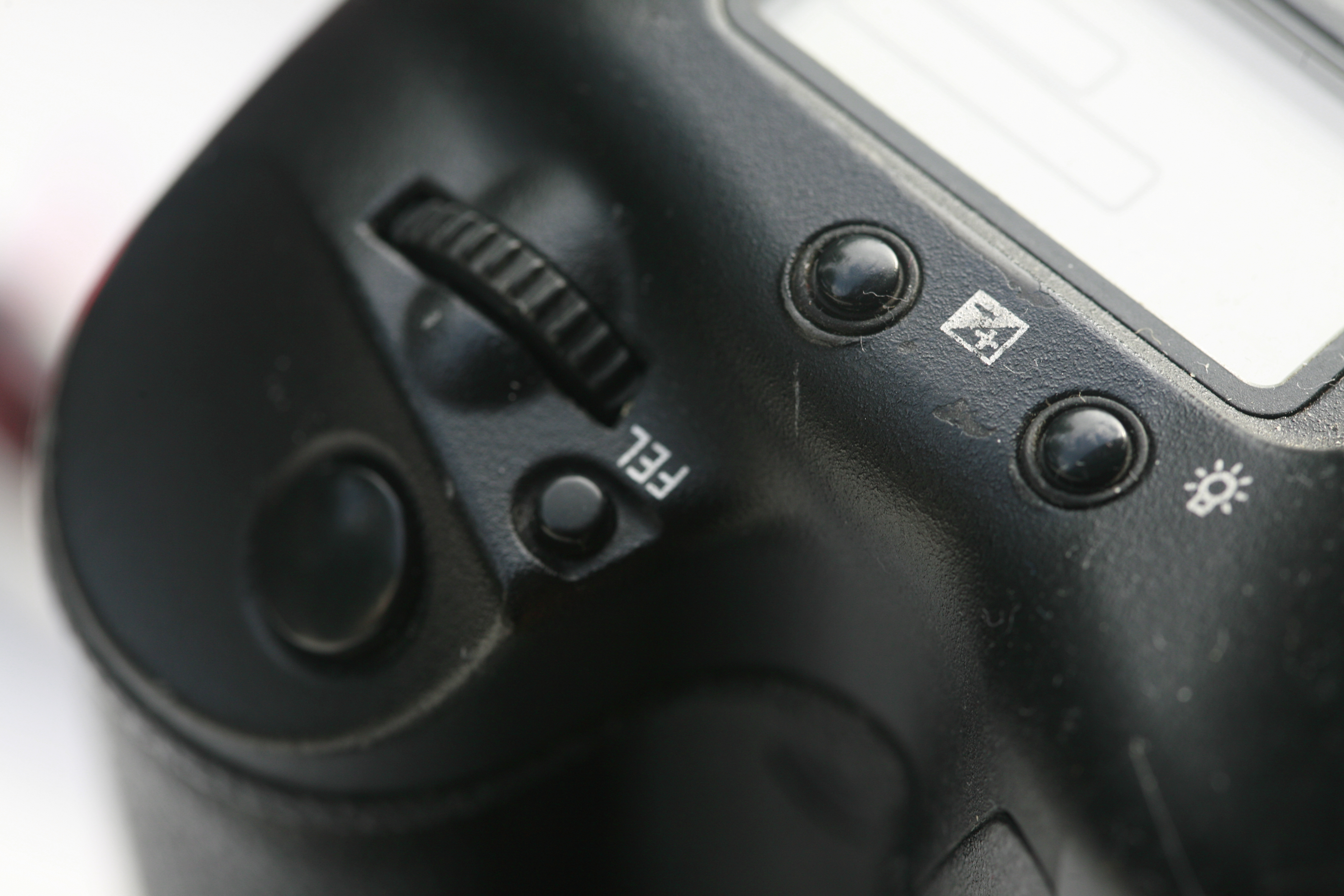
Shutter release button

== See also ==
- Canon EOS
- Canon EF lens mount

Type	Sensor	Class	00	01	02	03	04	05	06	07	08	09	10	11	12	13	14	15	16	17	18	19	20	21	22	23	24	25
DSLR	Full-frame	Flagship				1Ds		1Ds Mk II			1Ds Mk III					1D C												
DSLR	Full-frame	Flagship				1Ds		1Ds Mk II			1Ds Mk III				1D X					1D X Mk II ^{T}			1D X Mk III ^{T}					
DSLR	APS-H	Flagship			1D			1D Mk II	1D Mk II N		1D Mk III		1D Mk IV															
DSLR	Full-frame	Professional																	5DS / 5DS R									
DSLR	Full-frame	Professional							5D			_{x} 5D Mk II			_{x} 5D Mk III					5D Mk IV ^{T}								
DSLR	Full-frame	Advanced														_{x} 6D					_{x} 6D Mk II ^{AT}							
DSLR	APS-C	Advanced											_{x} 7D					_{x} 7D Mk II										
DSLR	APS-C	Mid-range						20Da								_{x} 60Da ^{A}												
DSLR	APS-C	Mid-range		D30	D60	10D		20D	30D		40D	_{x} 50D		_{x} 60D ^{A}		_{x} 70D ^{AT}		80D ^{AT}					90D ^{AT}					
DSLR	APS-C	Mid-range																	760D ^{AT}		77D ^{AT}							
DSLR	APS-C	Entry-level					300D	350D		400D	450D	_{x} 500D	_{x} 550D	_{x} 600D ^{A}		_{x} 650D ^{AT}	_{x} 700D ^{AT}		_{x} 750D ^{AT}		800D ^{AT}			850D ^{AT}				
DSLR	APS-C	Entry-level															_{x} 100D ^{T}		_{x} 200D ^{AT}				250D ^{AT}					
DSLR	APS-C	Entry-level										1000D		_{x} 1100D			_{x} 1200D			1300D		2000D						
DSLR	APS-C	Value																				4000D						
Early models			Canon EOS DCS 5 (1995); Canon EOS DCS 3 (1995); Canon EOS DCS 1 (1995); Canon EOS D2000 (1998); Canon EOS D6000 (1998)																									
Type	Sensor	Spec																										
Type	Sensor	Spec	00	01	02	03	04	05	06	07	08	09	10	11	12	13	14	15	16	17	18	19	20	21	22	23	24	25
