= Canon EOS-1D X Mark II =

2016 full-frame digital single-lens reflex camera

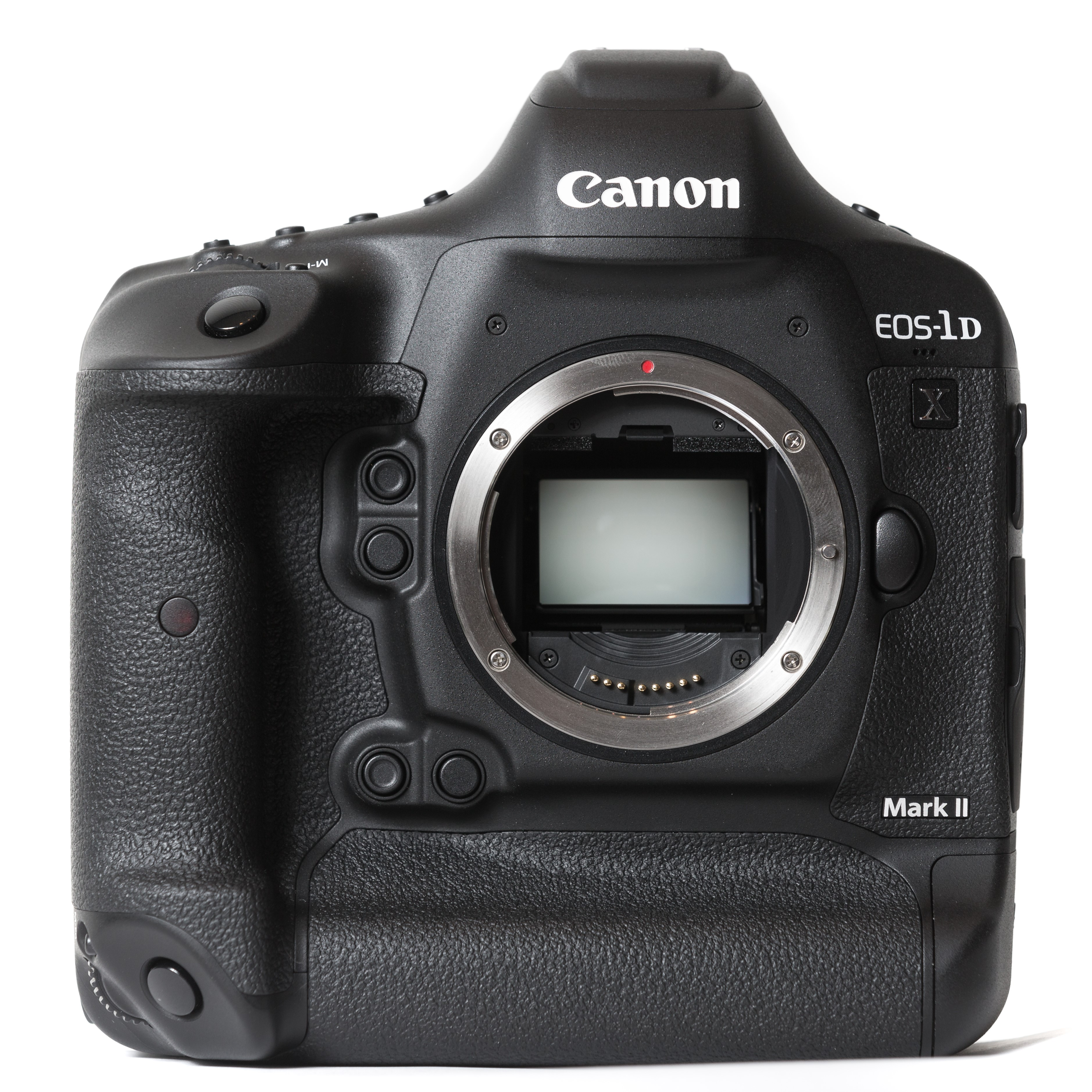

Overview
- Type: Digital single-lens reflex
- Released: April 2016
- Intro price: US$ 5,999.00

Lens
- Lens mount: Canon EF
- Lens: Interchangeable

Sensor/medium
- Sensor type: CMOS
- Sensor size: Full-frame (36×24 mm)
- Maximum resolution: 5472 × 3648 pixels (20.2 effective megapixels)
- Film speed: 100 – 51200 (expandable from L: 50 to H1: 102400; H2: 204800; H3: 409600)
- Storage media: Dual slots: CFast 2.0 and CompactFlash (CF) Type I (UDMA-7 supported)

Focusing
- Focus modes: One-Shot, AI Servo, Manual
- Focus areas: 61 AF points (41 cross-type AF points) with High-Density Reticular AF II

Exposure/metering
- Exposure modes: Program AE, Shutter priority AE, Aperture priority AE, Manual exposure, Bulb exposure, Custom, Movie
- Exposure metering: approx. 360,000 pixel RGB+IR sensor, EOS iTR AF

Flash
- Flash: External

Shutter
- Shutter: Electromechanical carbon fiber focal-plane
- Shutter speed range: 1/8000 s – 30 s, Bulb; X-sync at 1/250 s
- Continuous shooting: 14 fps with full AF/AE tracking; 16 fps in Live View mode

Viewfinder
- Viewfinder: Fixed eye-level pentaprism
- Viewfinder magnification: 0.76x
- Frame coverage: 100%

Image processing
- Image processor: DIGIC 6 and dual DIGIC 6+
- White balance: Available
- WB bracketing: Available

General
- Video recording: 4096 × 2160 (DCI 4K), 59.94 fps, approx. 800 Mbps
- LCD screen: 3.2" (8.1 cm) Clear View II colour TFT LCD touchscreen with 1,620,000 dots, live preview
- Battery: LP-E19
- Body features: Dust and weather sealed magnesium alloy
- Dimensions: 167.6×158×82.6 mm (6.60×6.22×3.25 in)
- Weight: 1,340 g (2.95 lb) including battery, body only
- Made in: Japan

Chronology
- Replaced: Canon EOS-1D X
- Replaced by: Canon EOS-1D X Mark III

The Canon EOS-1D X Mark II is a 20-megapixel full-frame DSLR flagship camera, announced on February 1, 2016, by Canon with an MSRP of US$5,999.00. It was the successor to the Canon EOS-1D X, which was released in 2012.

On January 6, 2020, Canon introduced the Canon EOS-1D X Mark III as the successor to the EOS-1D X Mark II.

== Features ==
New features over the Canon EOS-1D X are:

- DCI 4K (4096×2160) with up to 60 fps (59.94 fps) up to 29'59" (4K can only be recorded internally in MJPEG, the HDMI output is limited to 1080p)
- Continuous shooting rate of up to 14 frames per second with full autofocus; 16 fps in live view with locked focus and exposure. These rates are available when using the new LP-E19 battery. The EOS-1D X Mk II accepts the LP-E4N batteries of the Mk I and LP-E4 batteries of the 1D Mark IV, but burst mode reverts to the Mk I maximum of 12/14 fps.
- Full HD video (1920×1080) up to 120 fps (119.9 fps)
- All AF points support to a maximum aperture of f/8
- Digital lens optimizer for JPEG shooting.
- AI Servo AF III
- Continuous red illumination of all AF points
- Support for CFast (a variant of CompactFlash) memory cards
- Built-in GPS used for geotag information and syncing to UTC time
- One additional stop of ISO range with it being expandable to 409600
- Anti-flicker feature (introduced with the EOS 7D Mark II) – camera can be set to adjust the moment of exposure to compensate for flickering electric lighting
- A touchscreen LCD, which allows videographers to select the camera's AF point before and during video recording.
- Wi-Fi for wireless file transfer (with wireless transmitter)

== Comparison with the EOS-1D X ==
Model	EOS-1D X	EOS-1D X Mark II
Sensor size	Full-frame (36x24mm)	
Sensor resolution	approximately 18.1 megapixels (5184×3456)	approximately 20.2 megapixels (5472×3648)
Metering sensor	approximately 100,000 pixel RGB sensor (with dedicated DIGIC 4 processor)	approximately 360,000 pixel RGB+IR metering sensor (with dedicated DIGIC 6 processor)
Autofocus points	61 points (41 cross-type), 1-5 point (cross-type) at f/2.8 10-20 point (cross-type) at f/4.0 15-21 point (cross-type) at f/5.6 1 point (cross-type) at f/8.0	61 points (41 cross-type), 61 points (21 cross-type) at f/8
Processor	Dual DIGIC 5+	Dual DIGIC 6+
ISO sensitivity	100 – 51200 (Lo: 50, up to H2: 204800)	100 – 51200 (Lo: 50, up to H3: 409600)
Max. continuous shooting	approximately 14 fps with mirror locked up (JPEG), approximately 12 fps with full AF/AE tracking (JPEG/RAW/RAW+JPEG)	approximately 16 fps in live view mode (JPEG/RAW/RAW+JPEG), approximately 14 fps with full AF/AE tracking (JPEG/RAW/RAW+JPEG)
Shutter speeds	1/8000 s to 30 s, bulb, x-sync at 1/250 s	
Video record	Full HD (1920×1080): 60 fps/50 fps/30 fps/25 fps/24 fps (MPEG-4 AVC／H.264), ALL-I and IPB supported	DCI 4K (4096×2160): 60 fps/50 fps/30 fps/25 fps/24 fps (Motion JPEG), Full HD (1920×1080): 120 fps/100 fps/60 fps/50 fps/30 fps/25 fps/24 fps (MPEG-4 AVC／H.264), ALL-I, IPB (standard) and IPB (light) supported
Viewfinder magnification	approximately 0.76×	
LCD	approximately 1040K pixels, 3.2" monitor	approximately 1620K pixels, 3.2" touchscreen monitor
Lens mount	EF mount	
Card formats compatibility	2 CompactFlash (Type I&II, UDMA 7 supported) slots	1 CFast (CFast2.0 supported) and 1 CompactFlash (Type I, UDMA 7 supported) slots
Battery compatibility	Canon LP-E19, Canon LP-E4N, Canon LP-E4	
LAN (wired)	IEEE802.3u (supported Ethernet 1000BASE-T / 100BASE-TX / 10BASE-T)	
Wi-Fi	External accessory; supported IEEE802.11n (150 Mbit/s)/ IEEE802.11a (54 Mbit/s)/ IEEE802.11g (54 Mbit/s)/ IEEE802.11b (11 Mbit/s) via Canon WFT-E6	External accessory; supported IEEE802.11ac (433 Mbit/s)/ IEEE802.11n (150 Mbit/s)/ IEEE802.11a (54 Mbit/s)/ IEEE802.11g (54 Mbit/s)/ IEEE802.11b (11 Mbit/s) via Canon WFT-E8
GPS	External accessory	Built-in (supported GPS satellites, GLONASS and QZSS (Michibiki))
Announced	October 18, 2011 (released on June 20, 2012)	February 2, 2016 (released in April 2016)
Dimensions	approximately 158 by 163.6 by 82.7 millimetres (6.22 in × 6.44 in × 3.26 in)	approximately 158 by 167.6 by 82.6 millimetres (6.22 in × 6.60 in × 3.25 in)
Mass	approximately 1,340 grams (47 oz) (body only)	

== See also ==
- Canon EOS-1D C

Type	Sensor	Class	00	01	02	03	04	05	06	07	08	09	10	11	12	13	14	15	16	17	18	19	20	21	22	23	24	25
DSLR	Full-frame	Flagship				1Ds		1Ds Mk II			1Ds Mk III					1D C												
DSLR	Full-frame	Flagship				1Ds		1Ds Mk II			1Ds Mk III				1D X					1D X Mk II ^{T}			1D X Mk III ^{T}					
DSLR	APS-H	Flagship			1D			1D Mk II	1D Mk II N		1D Mk III		1D Mk IV															
DSLR	Full-frame	Professional																	5DS / 5DS R									
DSLR	Full-frame	Professional							5D			_{x} 5D Mk II			_{x} 5D Mk III					5D Mk IV ^{T}								
DSLR	Full-frame	Advanced														_{x} 6D					_{x} 6D Mk II ^{AT}							
DSLR	APS-C	Advanced											_{x} 7D					_{x} 7D Mk II										
DSLR	APS-C	Mid-range						20Da								_{x} 60Da ^{A}												
DSLR	APS-C	Mid-range		D30	D60	10D		20D	30D		40D	_{x} 50D		_{x} 60D ^{A}		_{x} 70D ^{AT}		80D ^{AT}					90D ^{AT}					
DSLR	APS-C	Mid-range																	760D ^{AT}		77D ^{AT}							
DSLR	APS-C	Entry-level					300D	350D		400D	450D	_{x} 500D	_{x} 550D	_{x} 600D ^{A}		_{x} 650D ^{AT}	_{x} 700D ^{AT}		_{x} 750D ^{AT}		800D ^{AT}			850D ^{AT}				
DSLR	APS-C	Entry-level															_{x} 100D ^{T}		_{x} 200D ^{AT}				250D ^{AT}					
DSLR	APS-C	Entry-level										1000D		_{x} 1100D			_{x} 1200D			1300D		2000D						
DSLR	APS-C	Value																				4000D						
Early models			Canon EOS DCS 5 (1995); Canon EOS DCS 3 (1995); Canon EOS DCS 1 (1995); Canon EOS D2000 (1998); Canon EOS D6000 (1998)																									
Type	Sensor	Spec																										
Type	Sensor	Spec	00	01	02	03	04	05	06	07	08	09	10	11	12	13	14	15	16	17	18	19	20	21	22	23	24	25
