= Canon EOS-1Ds Mark II =

2004 full-frame digital single-lens reflex camera

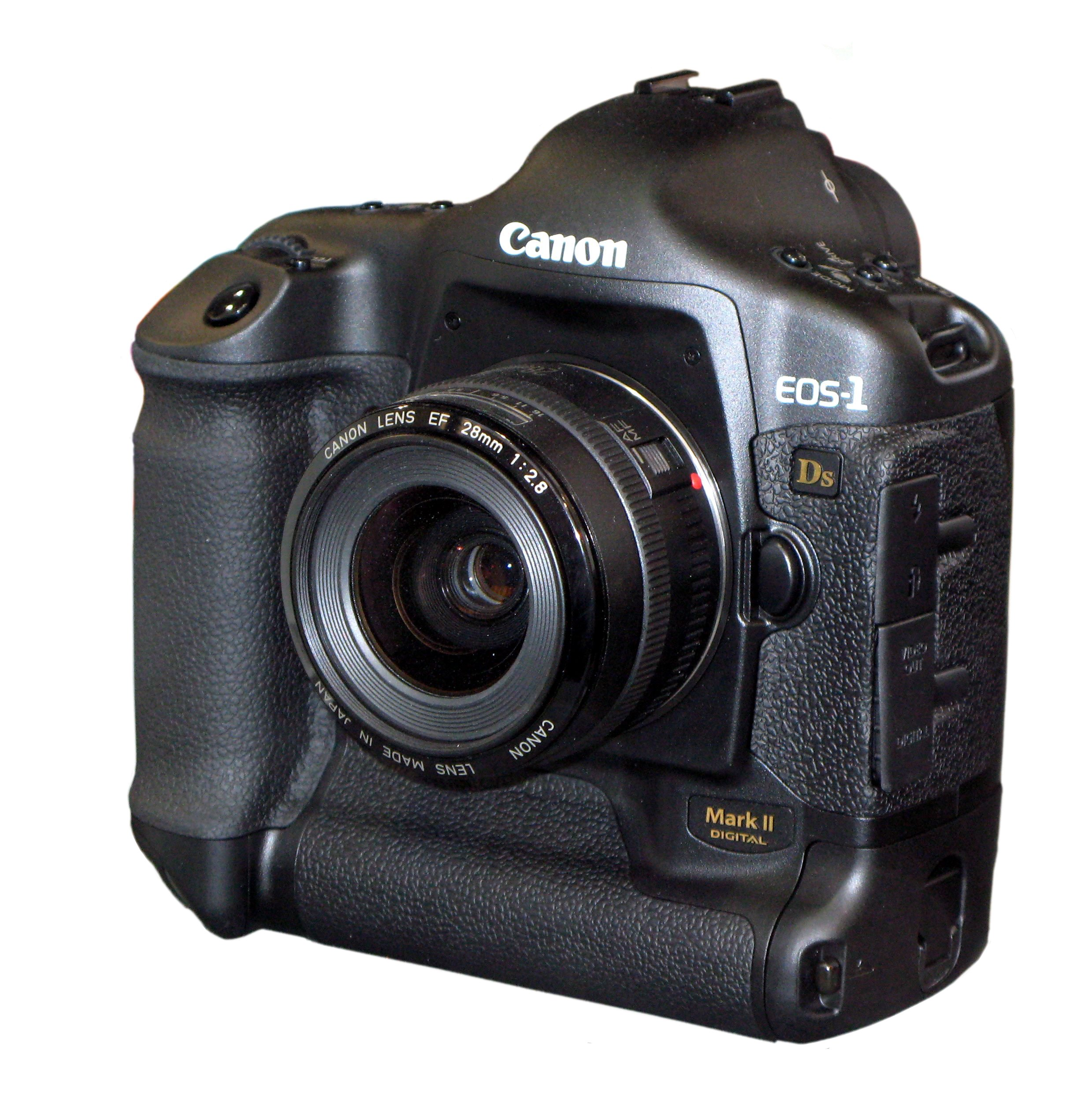

Overview
- Maker: Canon Inc.
- Type: Digital single-lens reflex
- Released: November 2004

Lens
- Lens: Interchangeable (EF)

Sensor/medium
- Sensor: 36 mm × 24 mm CMOS
- Maximum resolution: 4,992 × 3,328 (16.6 million)
- Film speed: 100–1600 in 1/3 stops, plus 50, 3200 as option
- Storage media: CompactFlash (Type I or Type II) and/or Secure Digital (SDHC)

Focusing
- Focus modes: One-shot, AI Servo, Manual
- Focus areas: 45 AF points

Exposure/metering
- Exposure metering: 21-zone TTL full aperture metering
- Metering modes: 21 area eval, partial, spot (center, AF point, multi-spot), center-weighted average

Shutter
- Shutter: Electronically controlled focal-plane
- Shutter speed range: 1/8000 to 30 s (1/3-stop increments), bulb, X-sync at 1/250 s
- Continuous shooting: Approx. 4.5 frame/s

Viewfinder
- Viewfinder: Optical

General
- LCD screen: 2.0 inch, 230,000 pixels
- Battery: Ni-MH battery pack
- Weight: 1,215 g (42.9 oz) (body only)
- Made in: Japan

Chronology
- Replaced: Canon EOS-1Ds
- Successor: Canon EOS-1Ds Mark III

The EOS-1Ds Mark II is a digital single-lens reflex camera body introduced by Canon Inc. in 2004. It was the top model in the Canon EOS line of digital cameras until April 2007, with a full-frame 16.7 megapixel CMOS sensor. The EOS-1Ds Mark II had the highest pixel count available in a 35mm format digital SLR at the time of its introduction until its successor was announced in August 2007. It uses the EF lens mount. The EOS-1Ds Mark II is a professional grade camera body and is large, ruggedly built, and dust/weather-resistant.

Being an autofocus camera, it has multiple autofocus modes and uses a 45-point autofocus system, and an option for manual focusing. Its viewfinder is a "fixed pentaprism". It also has a 2", TFT color LCD. Its dimensions are 156 mm in width, 157.6 mm in height, and 79.9 mm in depth (6.14 in × 6.20 in × 3.15 in). Its mass (without a battery) is 1,215 grams (42.9 oz).

The camera's image sensor is a single-plate CMOS-based integrated circuit, 24 mm × 36 mm in size; the same as 35mm film. It has approximately 17.2 million total photosites (16.7 million effective pixels in the final output). It uses a RGB primary color filter.

The shutter is an electronically controlled focal-plane shutter. Its maximum speed is 1/8000 of one second and it is rated for 200,000 actuations. Soft-touch shutter release occurs via electromagnetic signaling.

On 20 August 2007, Canon announced the successor to the Mark II: the Canon EOS-1Ds Mark III.

Type	Sensor	Class	00	01	02	03	04	05	06	07	08	09	10	11	12	13	14	15	16	17	18	19	20	21	22	23	24	25	26
DSLR	Full-frame	Flagship				1Ds		1Ds Mk II			1Ds Mk III					1D C													
DSLR	Full-frame	Flagship				1Ds		1Ds Mk II			1Ds Mk III				1D X					1D X Mk II ^{T}			1D X Mk III ^{T}						
DSLR	APS-H	Flagship			1D			1D Mk II	1D Mk II N		1D Mk III		1D Mk IV																
DSLR	Full-frame	Professional																	5DS / 5DS R										
DSLR	Full-frame	Professional							5D			_{x} 5D Mk II			_{x} 5D Mk III					5D Mk IV ^{T}									
DSLR	Full-frame	Advanced														_{x} 6D					_{x} 6D Mk II ^{AT}								
DSLR	APS-C	Advanced											_{x} 7D					_{x} 7D Mk II											
DSLR	APS-C	Mid-range						20Da								_{x} 60Da ^{A}													
DSLR	APS-C	Mid-range		D30	D60	10D		20D	30D		40D	_{x} 50D		_{x} 60D ^{A}			_{x} 70D ^{AT}		80D ^{AT}				90D ^{AT}						
DSLR	APS-C	Mid-range																	760D ^{AT}		77D ^{AT}								
DSLR	APS-C	Entry-level					300D	350D		400D	450D	_{x} 500D	_{x} 550D	_{x} 600D ^{A}		_{x} 650D ^{AT}	_{x} 700D ^{AT}		_{x} 750D ^{AT}		800D ^{AT}			850D ^{AT}					
DSLR	APS-C	Entry-level															_{x} 100D ^{T}		_{x} 200D ^{AT}				250D ^{AT}						
DSLR	APS-C	Entry-level										1000D		_{x} 1100D			_{x} 1200D			1300D		2000D							
DSLR	APS-C	Value																				4000D							
Early models			Canon EOS DCS 5 (1995); Canon EOS DCS 3 (1995); Canon EOS DCS 1 (1995); Canon EOS D2000 (1998); Canon EOS D6000 (1998)																										
Type	Sensor	Spec																											
Type	Sensor	Spec	00	01	02	03	04	05	06	07	08	09	10	11	12	13	14	15	16	17	18	19	20	21	22	23	24	25	26
