= Canon EOS-1D X =

2012 full-frame digital single-lens reflex camera

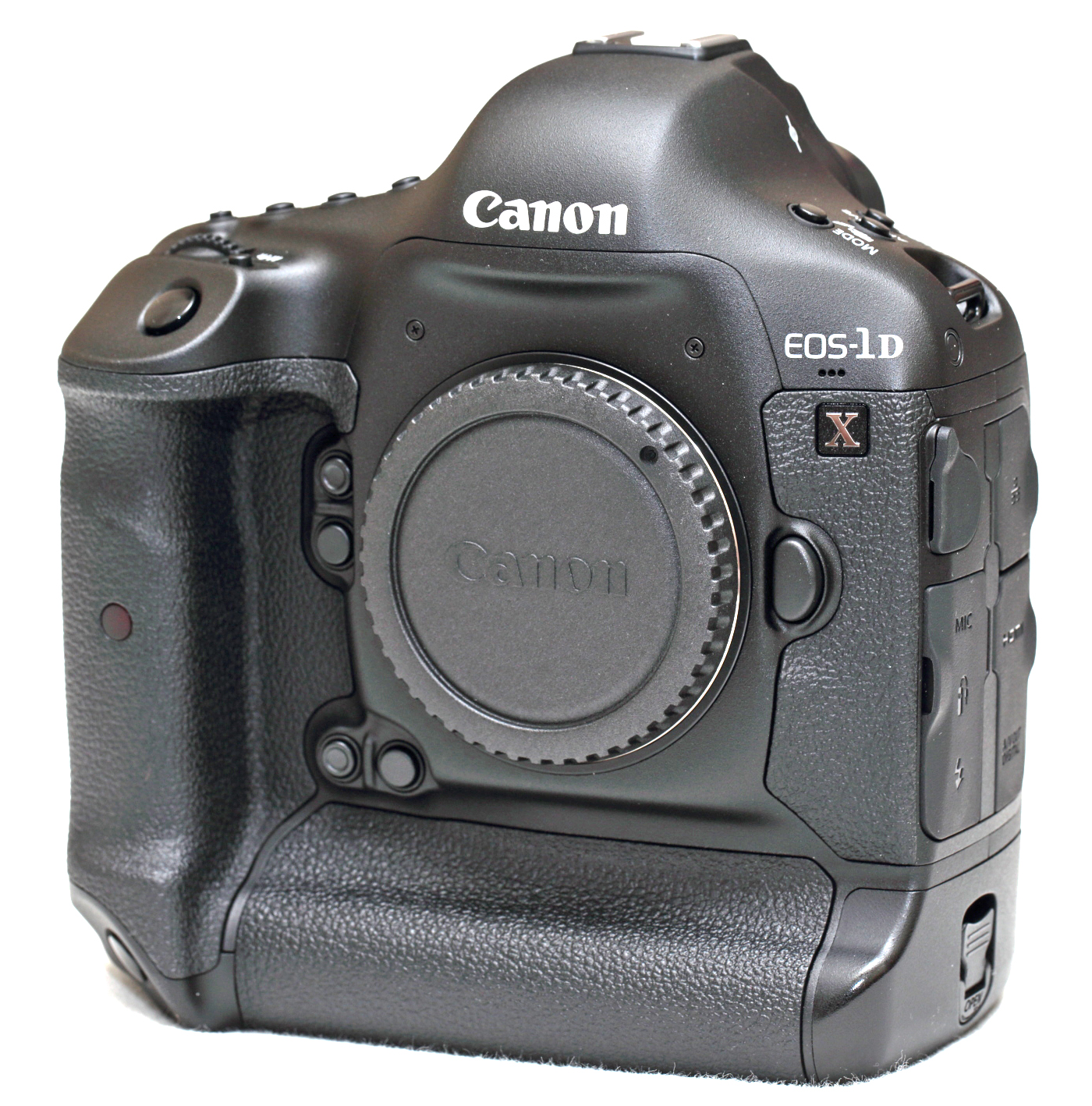

Overview
- Maker: Canon Inc.
- Type: Digital single-lens reflex camera
- Released: March 2012
- Intro price: USD 6,799.00

Lens
- Lens mount: Canon EF
- Lens: Interchangeable

Sensor/medium
- Sensor type: CMOS
- Sensor size: 36 x 24 mm (Full-frame)
- Maximum resolution: 5184 x 3456 (18.1 effective megapixels)
- Film speed: 100 – 51200 in 1/3 stops (expandable from L: 50 to H1: 102400; H2: 204800)
- Storage media: Dual CompactFlash (Type I or Type II)

Focusing
- Focus modes: One-Shot, AI Servo, Manual
- Focus areas: 61 AF points (41 cross-type AF points), High-Density Reticular AF with EOS Intelligent Tracking and Recognition (iTR)

Exposure/metering
- Exposure modes: Program AE, Shutter priority AE, Aperture priority AE, Manual exposure, Bulb exposure, Custom, Movie
- Exposure metering: 100,000 pixel RGB sensor, 0–20 EV, 252 zones, with EOS Intelligent Subject Analysis (iSA)
- Metering modes: Evaluative, Partial, Spot, Centre-weighted Average

Shutter
- Shutter: Electromechanical carbon fiber focal-plane shutter. Selectable electronic 1st curtain shutter.
- Shutter speed range: 1/8000 - 30 sec. (1/3-stop increments), Bulb; X-sync at 1/250 sec.
- Continuous shooting: 14 fps JPEG in Live View mode. 12 fps RAW, JPEG, RAW+JPEG.

Viewfinder
- Viewfinder: Eye-level pentaprism with 100% coverage and 0.76x magnification / LCD (Live View)

Image processing
- Image processor: DIGIC 4 and dual DIGIC 5+

General
- LCD screen: 3.2" (8.1 cm) Clear View II colour TFT LCD screen with 1,040,000 dots
- Battery: LP-E4N lithium-ion battery pack
- Dimensions: 6.2 × 6.4 × 3.3 inches (158 × 163.6 × 82.7 mm)
- Weight: 1,340 g (2.95 lb)
- Made in: Japan

Chronology
- Replaced: Canon EOS-1D Mark IV, Canon EOS-1Ds Mark III
- Successor: Canon EOS-1D X Mark II, Canon EOS-1D C

The Canon EOS-1D X is a professional digital SLR camera body by Canon Inc. It succeeded the company's previous flagship Canon EOS-1Ds Mark III and the Canon EOS-1D Mark IV. It was announced on 18 October 2011.

It was released in March 2012 with a suggested retail price of US$6,799.00 (body only) and a suggested retail price of £5,299 in the United Kingdom.

The camera is supplemented by the Canon EOS-1D C, a movie-oriented camera that shares most of its still photographic features with the 1D X. The 1D C was announced in April 2012 and released in March 2013.

In CES (January) 2014, Canon released firmware version 2.0.3 with significant improvements:

- Initial AF point selection and 61-point auto selection AF synchronization
- AF point switching according to camera orientation
- Improved low-light performance
- Expanded minimum shutter speed in auto ISO

On 1 February 2016, Canon introduced the Canon EOS-1D X Mark II as the successor to the EOS-1D X.

== Features ==
The Canon EOS-1D X is an 18.1 effective megapixels full-frame DSLR. The camera is capable of acquiring video at Full HD resolution (1,920 × 1,080 pixels) at frame rates of 24, 25 and 30 fps or 720p (1,280 × 720) at 50 or 60 fps, and SDTV (640 × 480) at 25 or 30 fps. The h.264 video can be switched between all inter frame and IPB with bidirectional prediction to reduce file size. The EOS-1D X has two DIGIC 5+ image processors for sensor reading and compression, and a separate DIGIC 4 dedicated to automatic exposure. It was officially released on 20 June 2012. Like the Canon EOS 5D Mark III and Canon EOS-1D C, the camera features 61 autofocus points, which are assisted by a 100,000-pixel metering sensor.

The camera features an ISO setting range from 50 to 204,800 which can be selected automatically or adjusted manually. Like all Canon DSLR full frame cameras, the 1D X does not feature a built in flash. The camera can shoot 14 frames per second continuous shooting JPEG (with mirror locked up, no autofocus) and 12 frames per second continuous shooting in RAW, JPEG, RAW+JPEG with full auto focus and lens aberration correction. According to Canon, the maximum shooting rate is reduced to 10 fps at ISO settings of 32,000 and higher. The camera's viewfinder has an estimated magnification of .76x and 100% field of view.

The camera can be operated remotely with a Canon WFT-E6A Wireless File Transmitter, allowing an external web enabled device to control the camera. The WFT-E6A Wireless File Transmitter unit also enables Bluetooth v2.1 +EDR, to embed GPS location data into files. The EOS-1D X also features dust and weather resistance. The Canon EOS-1D X and EOS-1D C have four customizable function buttons at the front of the camera, two that can be used for shooting vertically and two for horizontal shooting.

== Accessories ==
According to Canon's website, the EOS-1D X model comes equipped with:

- EOS-1D X Digital SLR Body
- Eyecup Eg
- Battery Pack LP-E4N
- Battery Charger LC-E4N
- Wide Neck Strap L7
- Cable Protector
- Stereo AV Cable AVC-DC400ST
- USB Interface Cable IFC-200U

== Known defects ==
Canon issued a product advisory indicating that insufficient lubrication within the camera's driving mechanism may lead to excessive wear, potentially causing autofocus to fail and the viewfinder image becoming "blurry" or "not steady". Any bodies sold with the issue are eligible for inspection and repair free of charge. Canon has not issued a recall for selected EOS-1D X and EOS-1D C models that have this issue. Only certain models are affected.

== See also ==
- Canon
- Canon EOS-1D C

Type	Sensor	Class	00	01	02	03	04	05	06	07	08	09	10	11	12	13	14	15	16	17	18	19	20	21	22	23	24	25
DSLR	Full-frame	Flagship				1Ds		1Ds Mk II			1Ds Mk III					1D C												
DSLR	Full-frame	Flagship				1Ds		1Ds Mk II			1Ds Mk III				1D X					1D X Mk II ^{T}			1D X Mk III ^{T}					
DSLR	APS-H	Flagship			1D			1D Mk II	1D Mk II N		1D Mk III		1D Mk IV															
DSLR	Full-frame	Professional																	5DS / 5DS R									
DSLR	Full-frame	Professional							5D			_{x} 5D Mk II			_{x} 5D Mk III					5D Mk IV ^{T}								
DSLR	Full-frame	Advanced														_{x} 6D					_{x} 6D Mk II ^{AT}							
DSLR	APS-C	Advanced											_{x} 7D					_{x} 7D Mk II										
DSLR	APS-C	Mid-range						20Da								_{x} 60Da ^{A}												
DSLR	APS-C	Mid-range		D30	D60	10D		20D	30D		40D	_{x} 50D		_{x} 60D ^{A}		_{x} 70D ^{AT}		80D ^{AT}					90D ^{AT}					
DSLR	APS-C	Mid-range																	760D ^{AT}		77D ^{AT}							
DSLR	APS-C	Entry-level					300D	350D		400D	450D	_{x} 500D	_{x} 550D	_{x} 600D ^{A}		_{x} 650D ^{AT}	_{x} 700D ^{AT}		_{x} 750D ^{AT}		800D ^{AT}			850D ^{AT}				
DSLR	APS-C	Entry-level															_{x} 100D ^{T}		_{x} 200D ^{AT}				250D ^{AT}					
DSLR	APS-C	Entry-level										1000D		_{x} 1100D			_{x} 1200D			1300D		2000D						
DSLR	APS-C	Value																				4000D						
Early models			Canon EOS DCS 5 (1995); Canon EOS DCS 3 (1995); Canon EOS DCS 1 (1995); Canon EOS D2000 (1998); Canon EOS D6000 (1998)																									
Type	Sensor	Spec																										
Type	Sensor	Spec	00	01	02	03	04	05	06	07	08	09	10	11	12	13	14	15	16	17	18	19	20	21	22	23	24	25
