= Canon EOS-1D X Mark III =

2020 full-frame digital single-lens reflex camera

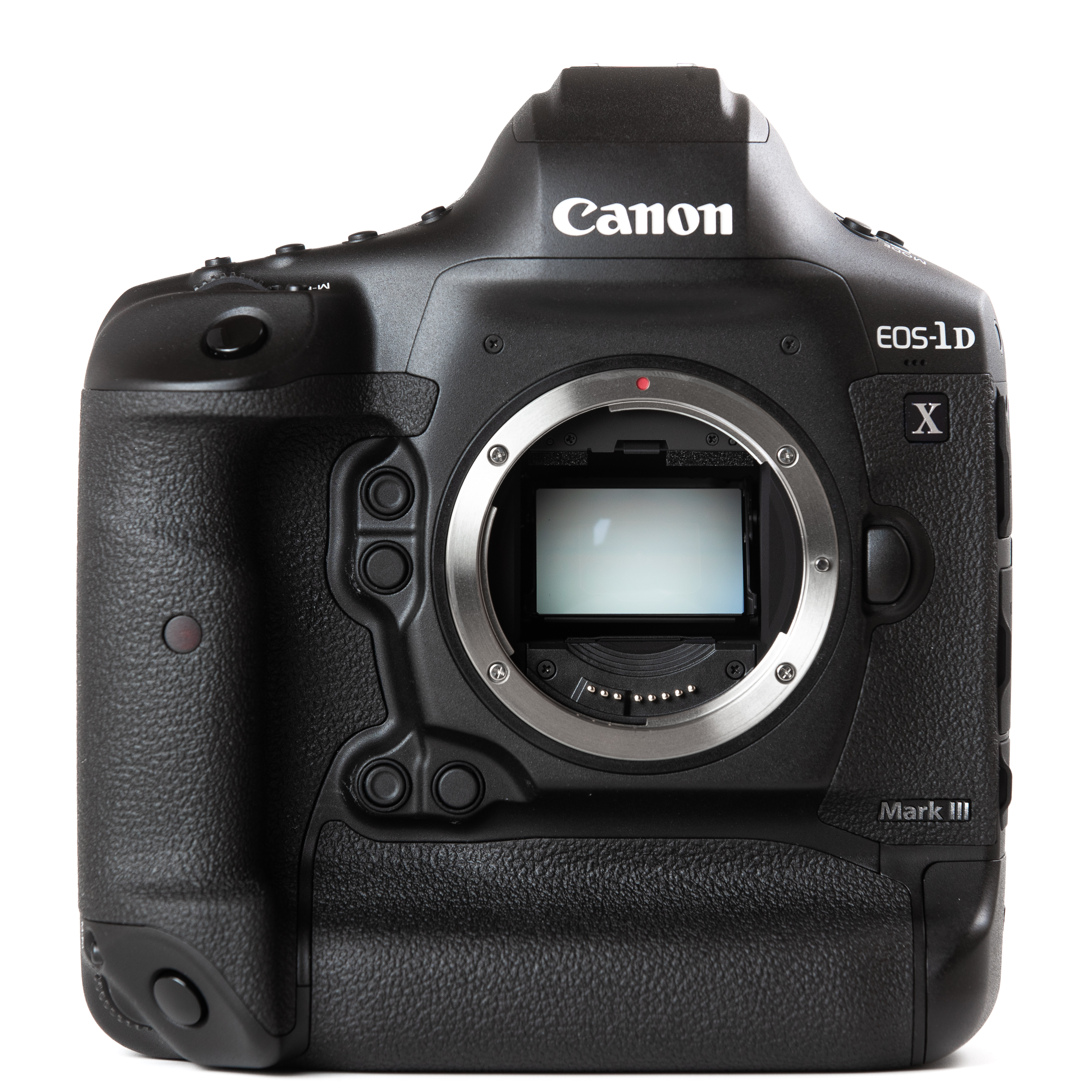

Overview
- Type: Digital single-lens reflex camera
- Production: January 2020 – September 2025
- Intro price: $6499 (body only)

Lens
- Lens mount: Canon EF
- Lens: Interchangeable

Sensor/medium
- Sensor type: CMOS
- Sensor size: 36.0 × 24.0 mm (Full-frame)
- Maximum resolution: 5472 × 3648 (20.0 effective megapixels)
- Film speed: 100 – 102400 (expandable from L: 50 to H1: 204800; H2: 409600; H3: 819200)
- Storage media: Dual slots: CFexpress card

Focusing
- Focus modes: One-Shot, AI Servo, Manual
- Focus areas: 191 AF points (155 cross-type AF points)

Exposure/metering
- Exposure modes: Program AE, Shutter priority AE, Aperture priority AE, Manual exposure, Bulb exposure, Custom
- Exposure metering: approx. 400,000 pixel RGB+IR sensor

Flash
- Flash: Not built in

Shutter
- Shutter: Electromechanical carbon fiber focal-plane
- Shutter speed range: 1/8000 s – 30 s, Bulb; X-sync at 1/250 s
- Continuous shooting: 16 fps with full AF/AE tracking; 20 fps in Live View mode

Viewfinder
- Viewfinder: Eye-level pentaprism with 100% coverage and 0.76x magnification / LCD (Live View)

Image processing
- Image processor: DIGIC X
- White balance: Available
- WB bracketing: Available

General
- Video recording: 5.5K RAW (5472 x 2886), 59.94 fps
- LCD screen: 80.1 mm (3.15 in) TFT LCD touchscreen with 2,100,000 dots
- Battery: LP-E19
- Body features: Dust and weather sealed magnesium alloy
- Dimensions: 167.6 mm × 158 mm × 82.6 mm (6.60 in × 6.22 in × 3.25 in)
- Weight: 1,440 g (3.17 lb) including battery and CFexpress card, body only
- Latest firmware: 1.9.0 / 15 March 2024; 2 years ago
- Made in: Japan

Chronology
- Predecessor: Canon EOS-1D X Mark II
- Successor: Canon EOS R1 (mirrorless)

The Canon EOS-1D X Mark III is the company's 20-megapixel full-frame DSLR flagship camera, announced on January 6, 2020, by Canon. It is the successor to the Canon EOS-1D X Mark II, which was released on February 1, 2016.

The EOS-1D X Mark III is Canon's final full-frame DSLR camera, with the company shifting entirely to mirrorless cameras.

== Features ==
New features over the Canon EOS-1D X Mark II are:

- 5.5k (5472 × 2886) video up to 60 fps (59.94 fps)
- Continuous shooting rate of up to 16 frames per second with full autofocus; 20 fps in live view.
- 191 AF points support
- Dual CFexpress card slots (as opposed to one Compact Flash and one CFast slot in EOS-1D X Mark II)
- ISO range up to 102400 (Extended H3 up to 819200)
- Support for HDR PQ still photo shooting in High Efficiency Image File Format (HEIF) compliant with Rec. 2100 color space (PQ transfer function, Rec. 2020 color primaries, 10 bit depth, 4:2:2 YCbCr subsampling)

Type	Sensor	Class	00	01	02	03	04	05	06	07	08	09	10	11	12	13	14	15	16	17	18	19	20	21	22	23	24	25	26
DSLR	Full-frame	Flagship				1Ds		1Ds Mk II			1Ds Mk III					1D C													
DSLR	Full-frame	Flagship				1Ds		1Ds Mk II			1Ds Mk III				1D X					1D X Mk II ^{T}			1D X Mk III ^{T}						
DSLR	APS-H	Flagship			1D			1D Mk II	1D Mk II N		1D Mk III		1D Mk IV																
DSLR	Full-frame	Professional																	5DS / 5DS R										
DSLR	Full-frame	Professional							5D			_{x} 5D Mk II			_{x} 5D Mk III					5D Mk IV ^{T}									
DSLR	Full-frame	Advanced														_{x} 6D					_{x} 6D Mk II ^{AT}								
DSLR	APS-C	Advanced											_{x} 7D					_{x} 7D Mk II											
DSLR	APS-C	Mid-range						20Da								_{x} 60Da ^{A}													
DSLR	APS-C	Mid-range		D30	D60	10D		20D	30D		40D	_{x} 50D		_{x} 60D ^{A}			_{x} 70D ^{AT}		80D ^{AT}				90D ^{AT}						
DSLR	APS-C	Mid-range																	760D ^{AT}		77D ^{AT}								
DSLR	APS-C	Entry-level					300D	350D		400D	450D	_{x} 500D	_{x} 550D	_{x} 600D ^{A}		_{x} 650D ^{AT}	_{x} 700D ^{AT}		_{x} 750D ^{AT}		800D ^{AT}			850D ^{AT}					
DSLR	APS-C	Entry-level															_{x} 100D ^{T}		_{x} 200D ^{AT}				250D ^{AT}						
DSLR	APS-C	Entry-level										1000D		_{x} 1100D			_{x} 1200D			1300D		2000D							
DSLR	APS-C	Value																				4000D							
Early models			Canon EOS DCS 5 (1995); Canon EOS DCS 3 (1995); Canon EOS DCS 1 (1995); Canon EOS D2000 (1998); Canon EOS D6000 (1998)																										
Type	Sensor	Spec																											
Type	Sensor	Spec	00	01	02	03	04	05	06	07	08	09	10	11	12	13	14	15	16	17	18	19	20	21	22	23	24	25	26
