= Canon Speedlite =

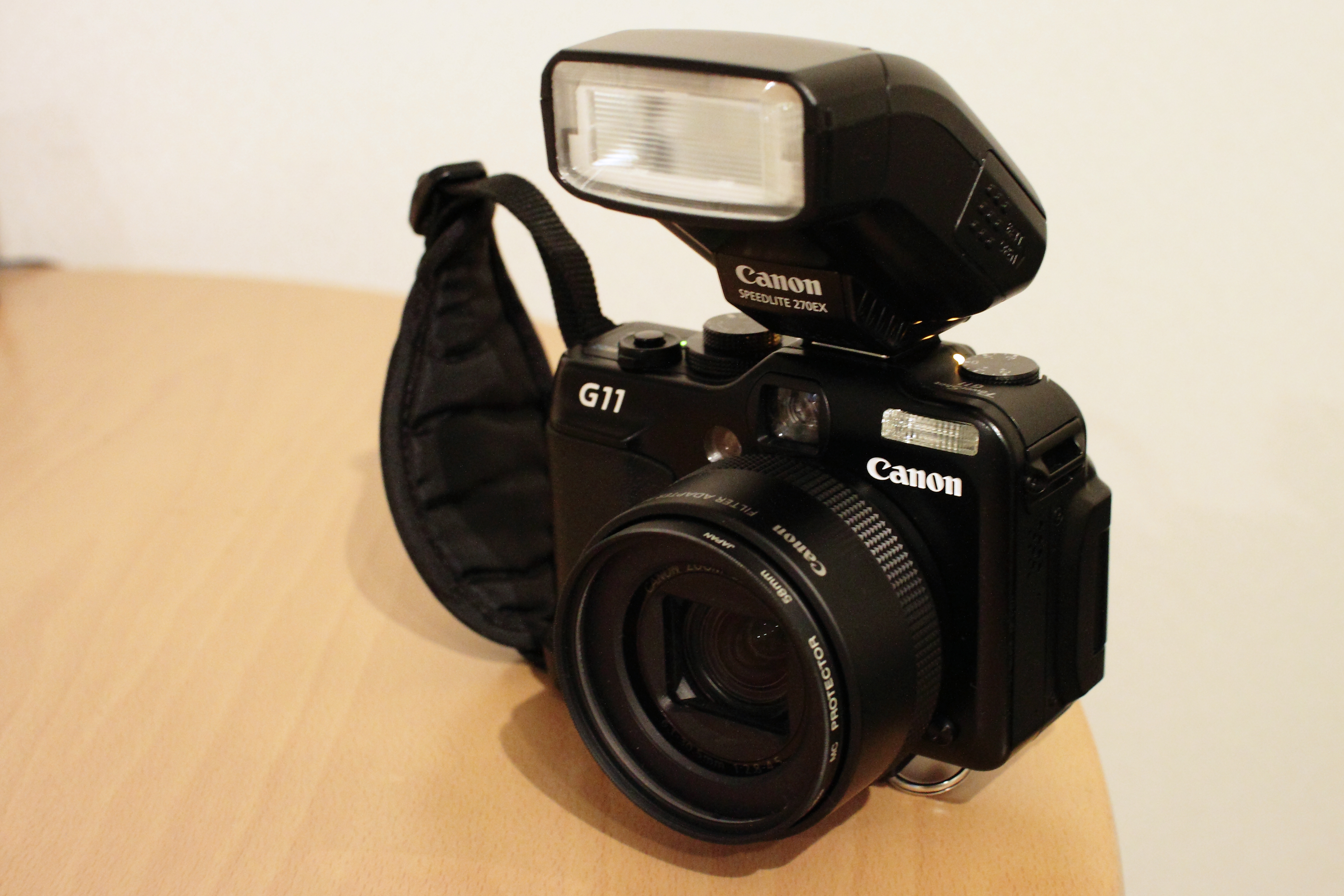
A Canon PowerShot G11 compact digital camera with a Speedlite 270EX flash mounted

Speedlite is a brand of Canon electronic flashes designed for use with the manual-focus FD system, the autofocus EOS system, and various other cameras such as the Canonet 35mm rangefinders and the PowerShot G series advanced digital compact cameras.
