= List of image resolutions used in digital cameras =

The following is a list of image resolutions implemented in the image sensors used in various digital cameras.

Width (px)	Height (px)	Aspect ratio	Actual pixel count	Megapixels	Camera examples
32	32	1:1	1024	0.001	Cromemco Cyclops (1975)
100	100	1:1	10,000	0.01	Kodak Prototype by Steven Sasson (1975)
320	240	4:3 aspect ratio	76,800	0.07	Casio QV-10 (1995)
640	480	4:3 aspect ratio	307,200	0.3	Apple QuickTake 100 (1994)
832	608	4:3 aspect ratio	505,856	0.5	Canon Powershot 600 (1996)
1,024	768	4:3 aspect ratio	786,432	0.8	Olympus D-300L (1996)
1024	1024	1:1	1,048,576	1.0	Nikon NASA F4 (1991)
1,280	960	4:3 aspect ratio	1,228,800	1.3	Fujifilm DS-300 (1997)
1,280	1,024	5:4	1,310,720	1.3	Fujifilm MX-700, Fujifilm MX-1700 (1999), Leica Digilux (1998), Leica Digilux Zoom (2000)
1,600	1,200	4:3 aspect ratio	1,920,000	2	Nikon Coolpix 950, Samsung GT-S3500
1,600	1,280	5:4	2,048,000	2	Pentax EI2000/Hewlett Packard 912
2,012	1,324	3:2 aspect ratio	2,663,888	2.74	Nikon D1
2,048	1,536	4:3 aspect ratio	3,145,728	3	Canon PowerShot A75, Nikon Coolpix 995
2,160	1,440	3:2 aspect ratio	3,110,400	3.11	Canon EOS D30
2,272	1,704	4:3 aspect ratio	3,871,488	4	Olympus Stylus 410, Contax i4R (although CCD is actually square 2,272×2,272)
2,464	1,648	3:2 aspect ratio	4,060,672	4.1	Canon 1D
2,560	1,920	4:3 aspect ratio	4,915,200	5	Olympus E-1, Sony Cyber-shot DSC-F707, Sony Cyber-shot DSC-F717
2,816	2,112	4:3 aspect ratio	5,947,392	5.9	Olympus Stylus 600 Digital
3,008	2,000	3:2 aspect ratio	6,016,000	6	D100, Nikon D40, D50, D70, D70s, Pentax K100D, Konica Minolta Maxxum 7D, Konica Minolta Maxxum 5D, Epson R-D1
3,072	2,048	3:2 aspect ratio	6,291,456	6.3	Canon EOS 10D, Canon EOS 300D
3,072	2,304	4:3 aspect ratio	7,077,888	7	Olympus FE-210, Canon PowerShot A620
3,456	2,304	3:2 aspect ratio	7,962,624	8	Canon EOS 350D
3,264	2,448	4:3 aspect ratio	7,990,272	8	Olympus E-500, Olympus SP-350, Canon PowerShot A720 IS, Nokia 701, HTC Desire HD, Apple iPhone 4S
3,504	2,336	3:2 aspect ratio	8,185,344	8.2	Canon EOS 30D, Canon EOS-1D Mark II, Canon EOS-1D Mark II N
3,520	2,344	3:2 aspect ratio	8,250,880	8.25	Canon EOS 20D
3,648	2,736	4:3 aspect ratio	9,980,928	10	Canon PowerShot G11, Canon PowerShot G12, Canon PowerShot S90, Canon PowerShot S95, Nikon CoolPix P7000, Nikon CoolPix P7100, Olympus E-410, Olympus E-510, Panasonic FZ50, Fujifilm FinePix HS10, Samsung EX1
3,872	2,592	3:2 aspect ratio	10,036,224	10	Nikon D40x, Nikon D60, Nikon D3000, Nikon D200, Nikon D80, Pentax K10D, Pentax K200D, Sony DSLR-A100
3,888	2,592	3:2 aspect ratio	10,077,696	10.1	Canon EOS 40D, Canon EOS 400D, Canon EOS 1000D
4,064	2,704	3:2 aspect ratio	10,989,056	11	Canon EOS-1Ds
4,000	3,000	4:3 aspect ratio	12,000,000	12	Canon Powershot G9, Fujifilm FinePix S200EXR, Nikon Coolpix L110, Kodak Easyshare Max Z990
4,256	2,832	3:2 aspect ratio	12,052,992	12.1	Nikon D3, Nikon D3S, Nikon D700, Fujifilm FinePix S5 Pro
4,272	2,848	3:2 aspect ratio	12,166,656	12.2	Canon EOS 450D
4,032	3,024	4:3 aspect ratio	12,192,768	12.2	Olympus PEN E-P1
4,288	2,848	3:2 aspect ratio	12,212,224	12.2	Nikon D2Xs/D2X, Nikon D300, Nikon D300S, Nikon D90, Nikon D5000, Pentax K-x
4,900	2,580	16:9 aspect ratio	12,642,000	12.6	RED ONE Mysterium
4,368	2,912	3:2 aspect ratio	12,719,616	12.7	Canon EOS 5D
5,120	2,700	16:9 aspect ratio	13,824,000	13.8	RED Mysterium-X
7,920 (2,640 × 3)	1,760	3:2 aspect ratio	13,939,200	13.9	Sigma SD14, Sigma DP1 (3 layers of pixels, 4.7 MP per layer, in Foveon X3 sensor)
4,672	3,104	3:2 aspect ratio	14,501,888	14.5	Pentax K20D, Pentax K-7
4,752	3,168	3:2 aspect ratio	15,054,336	15.1	Canon EOS 50D, Canon EOS 500D, Sigma SD1
4,896	3,264	3:2 aspect ratio	15,980,544	16.0	Canon EOS 1D Mark IV, Fujifilm X-Pro1, Fujifilm X-E1 (X-Trans sensor has a different pattern to a Bayer sensor)
4,928	3,264	3:2 aspect ratio	16,075,136	16.1	Nikon D7000, Nikon D5100, Pentax K-5
4,992	3,328	3:2 aspect ratio	16,613,376	16.6	Canon EOS-1Ds Mark II
4,080	4,080	1:1	16,646,400	16.6	Hasselblad 503CWD
5,184	3,456	3:2 aspect ratio	17,915,904	17.9	Canon EOS 1D X, Canon EOS 7D, Canon EOS 60D, Canon EOS 100D, Canon EOS 550D, Canon EOS 600D, Canon EOS 650D, Canon EOS 700D
4,928	3,696	4:3 aspect ratio	18,200,000	18.2	Sony DSC-HX20
5,270	3,516	3:2 aspect ratio	18,529,320	18.5	Leica M9, RED Dragon
5,472	3,648	3:2 aspect ratio	19,961,856	19.9	Canon EOS-1D X Mark II, Canon EOS 6D, Canon EOS 7D Mark II, Canon EOS 70D, Canon EOS R6
5,616	3,744	3:2 aspect ratio	21,026,304	21.0	Canon EOS-1Ds Mark III, Canon EOS-5D Mark II
5,760	3,840	3:2 aspect ratio	22,118,400	22.1	Canon EOS 5D Mark III
6,000	4,000	3:2 aspect ratio	24,000,000	24	Canon EOS 80D, Canon EOS 750D, Canon EOS 760D, Nikon D5300, Nikon D5500
6,000	4,000	3:2 aspect ratio	24,000,000	24.3	Sony α5100*, Sony α6000*, Sony α6300*, Sony α6500 *, Sony α7*, Sony α7 II*, Sony α9*, Sony Alpha 99 (* The pixel number of 6,000x4,000 ist the number of "effective pixels". The sensor usually has a few extra rows of pixels on all four sides, which explains the sensor resolution of 24.3 MPixels often stated, but no information about the exact image size available.)
6,016	4,000	3:2 aspect ratio	24,064,000	24.1	Nikon D3300 Canon M50
6,048	4,032	3:2 aspect ratio	24,385,536	24.4	Nikon D3X, Nikon D600, Nikon D610, Nikon D750, Pentax K-3, Sony Cyber-shot DSC-RX1, Sony Cyber-shot DSC-RX1R, Sony α850, Sony α900, Sony α99
6,064	4,040	3:2 aspect ratio	24,498,560	24.5	Sony α7 III
6,244	4,168	3:2 aspect ratio	26,024,992	26	Fujifilm X-T3, Fujifilm X-T30, Pentax K-3 III
5,140	5,140	1:1	26,419,600	26.4	Leica S1 (line scanner, 1997)
6,940	4,640	3:2 aspect ratio	32,201,600	32.2	Canon EOS 90D, Canon EOS M6 Mark II
7,360	4,912	3:2 aspect ratio	36,152,320	36.2	Nikon D800, Nikon D810, Pentax K-1, Sony α7R
7,500	5,000	3:2 aspect ratio	37,500,000	37.5	Leica S2
7,212	5,142	4:3 aspect ratio	39,031,344	39.0	Hasselblad H3DII-39
7,216	5,412	4:3 aspect ratio	39,052,992	39.1	Leica RCD100
7,264	5,440	4:3 aspect ratio	39,516,160	39.5	Pentax 645D
7,320	5,484	4:3 aspect ratio	40,142,880	40.1	Phase One IQ140
7,728	5,368	~ 10:7	41,483,904	41.5	Nokia 808 PureView
7,952	5,304	3:2 aspect ratio	42,177,408	42.4	Sony α7R II, Sony α7R III, Sony Cyber-shot DSC-RX1R II, Sony α99 II
8,192	5,464	3:2 aspect ratio	44,761,088	44.8	Canon EOS R5
8,256	5,504	3:2 aspect ratio	45,441,024	45.4	Nikon D850, Nikon Z7
8,176	6,132	4:3 aspect ratio	50,135,232	50.1	Hasselblad H3DII-50, Hasselblad H4D-50
8,688	5,792	3:2 aspect ratio	50,320,896	50.3	Canon EOS 5DS / 5DS R
8,256	6,192	3:2 aspect ratio	51,121,152	51.1	Pentax 645Z
8,256	6,192	4:3 aspect ratio	51,121,152	51.1	Fujifilm GFX 50S
8,256	6,192	4:3 aspect ratio	51,121,152	51.1	Fujifilm GFX 50R
11,250	5,000	9:4	56,250,000	56.3	Better Light 4000E-HS (scanned)
8,956	6,708	4:3 aspect ratio	60,076,848	60.1	Hasselblad H4D-60
9,504	6,336	3:2 aspect ratio	60,217,344	60.2	Sony α7R IV
8,984	6,732	4:3 aspect ratio	60,480,288	60.5	Phase One IQ160, Phase One P65+
10,320	7,752	4:3 aspect ratio	80,000,640	80	Leaf Aptus-II 12, Leaf Aptus-II 12R
10,328	7,760	4:3 aspect ratio	80,145,280	80.1	Phase One IQ180
9,372	9,372	1:1	87,834,384	87.8	Leica RC30 (point scanner)
11,648	8,736	4:3 aspect ratio	101,756,928	101.8	Fujifilm GFX 100
12,600	10,500	6:5	132,300,000	132.3	Phase One PowerPhase FX/FX+ (line scanner)
18,000	8,000	9:4	144,000,000	144	Better Light 6000-HS/6000E-HS (line scanner)
21,250	7,500	17:6	159,375,000	159.4	Seitz 6x17 Digital (line scanner)
16,352*	12,264*	4:3 aspect ratio	200,540,928	200.5	Hasselblad H4D-200MS (*actuated multi (6x) shot)
18,000	12,000	3:2 aspect ratio	216,000,000	216	Better Light Super 6K-HS (line scanner)
24,000	15,990	~	383,760,000	383.8	Better Light Super 8K-HS (line scanner)
30,600	13,600	9:4	416,160,000	416.2	Better Light Super 10K-HS (line scanner)
62,830	7,500	~ 25:3	471,225,000	471.2	Seitz Roundshot D3 (80 mm lens) (scanned)
62,830	13,500	~ 5:1	848,205,000	848.2	Seitz Roundshot D3 (110 mm lens) (line scanner)
38,000	38,000	1:1	1,444,000,000	1,444	Pan-STARRS PS1
157,000	18,000	~ 26:3	2,826,000,000	2,826	Better Light 300 mm lens Digital (line scanner)

== See also ==
- Image sensor format — the sizes and shapes of common image sensors
- Exmor - the exact sizes of Sony Exmor sensors, often mentioning the camera(s) using them. Sony sells some of theses sensors to other camera manufacturers.
