= Canon EOS 300 =

1999 35mm single-lens reflex camera

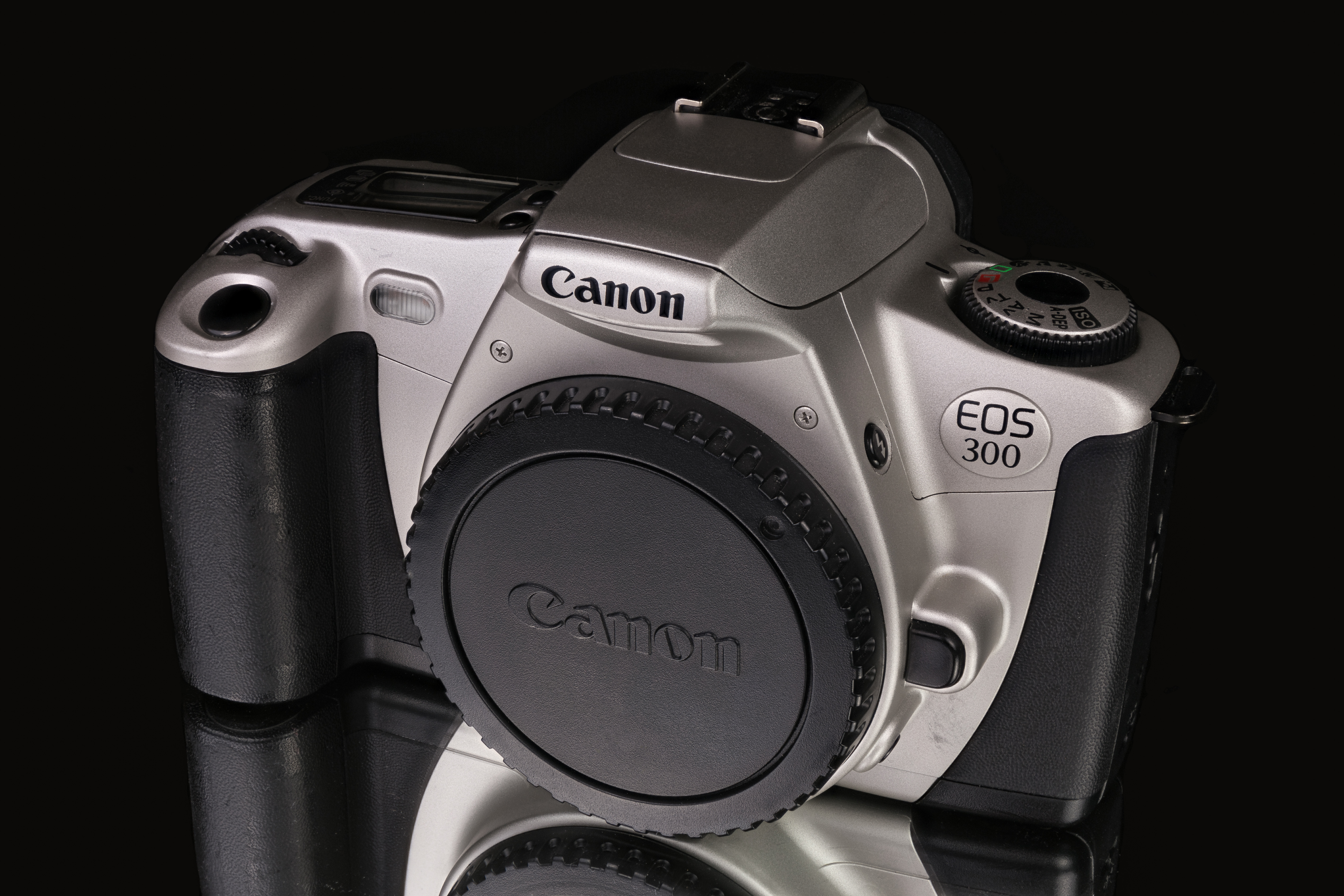

Overview
- Maker: Canon Inc.
- Type: 35mm SLR

Lens
- Lens mount: Canon EF lens mount

Focusing
- Focus: TTL Phase Detection Autofocus (7 zone)

Exposure/metering
- Exposure: PASM autoexposure 35 zone evaluative metering

Flash
- Flash: Built-in flash

Shutter
- Frame rate: 1.5 frame/s

General
- Dimensions: 140×90×58.5 mm (5.51×3.54×2.30 in), 335g

The Canon EOS 300 (EOS Kiss III in Japan, EOS Rebel 2000 in North America) is a consumer-level 35mm single-lens reflex camera, produced by Canon of Japan from April 1999 until September 2002 as part of their EOS system. Designed under the supervision of Yasuhiro Morishita, the camera was intended as a replacement for the Canon EOS 500N. The camera was a success for Canon, selling exceedingly well and dominating its market sector until it was replaced by the EOS 300V (Rebel Ti, Kiss 5). Canon EOS 300 won European Imaging and Sound Association Award 1999-2000. Like other low-priced SLRs of the time, the EOS 300 used a pentamirror viewfinder instead of a pentaprism, and had a polycarbonate body.

The autofocus capabilities of this camera were identical to Canon's much more expensive Elan 7 with six single-line CMOS sensors surrounding a central cross-type sensor.

The EOS 300 should not be confused with the later Canon EOS 300D (EOS Digital Rebel in the US and EOS Kiss Digital in Japan), a popular entry-level digital SLR from 2003.

Class	1987	1988	1989	1990	1991	1992	1993	1994	1995	1996	1997	1998	1999	2000	2001	2002	2003	2004	2005	2006	2007	…	2018
Professional				1					1N					1V									
Professional				RT					1N RS														
High-end				10			5						3										
Advanced		620		600		100				50					30				30V				
Midrange	650				1000F	1000F N		500			500N			300			300V		300X				
Entry-level		750	850	700					5000				3000			3000N		3000V					
Entry-level											IX												
Entry-level												IX 7											
