= Canon EOS 350D =

2005 APS-C digital single-lens reflex camera

Canon EOS 350D Canon EOS Digital Rebel XT Canon EOS Kiss Digital N
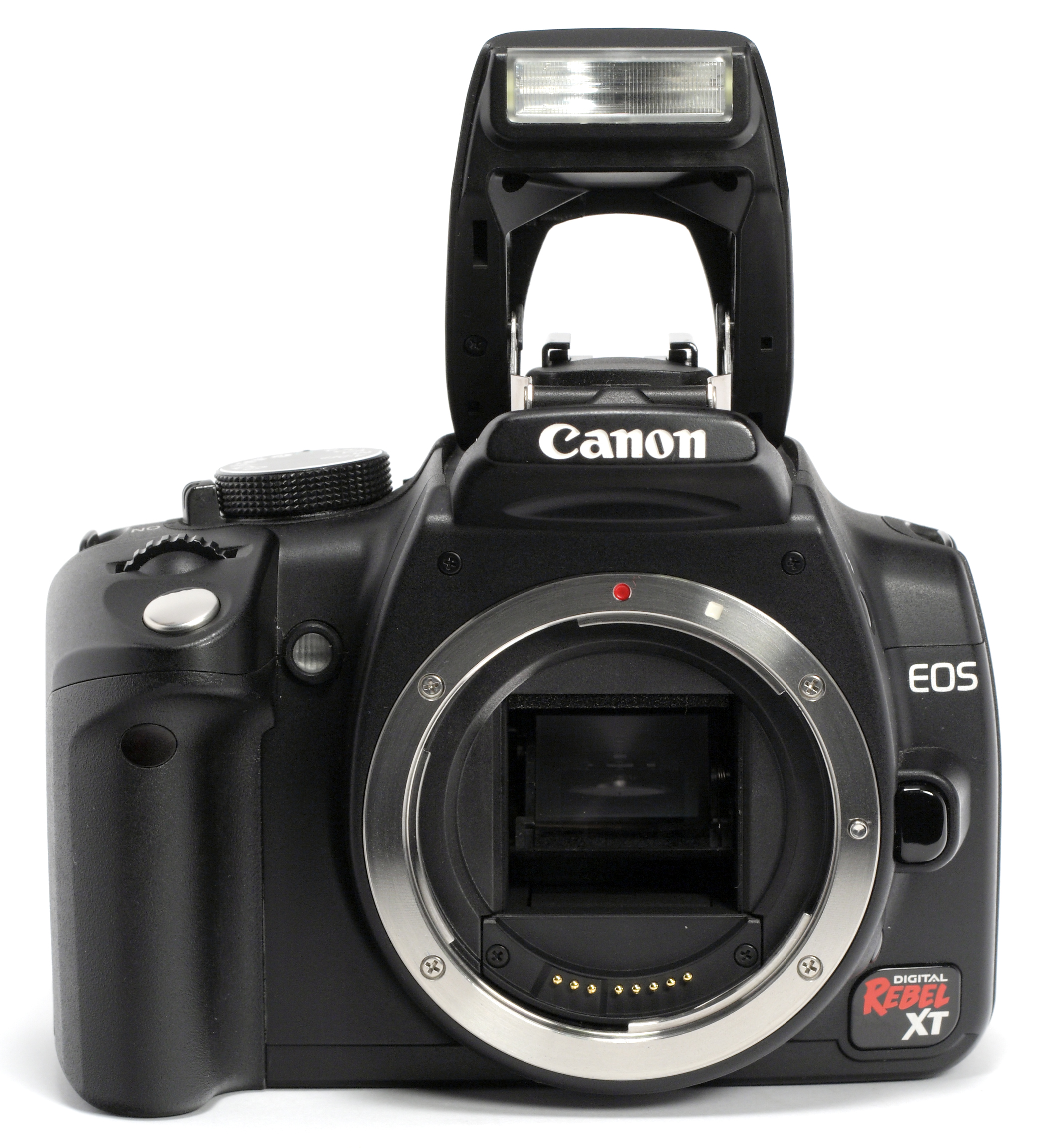

Overview
- Maker: Canon Inc.
- Type: Single-lens reflex

Lens
- Lens: Interchangeable (EF-S, EF)

Sensor/medium
- Sensor: CMOS APS-C 22.2 × 14.8 mm (1.6× conversion factor)
- Maximum resolution: 3,456 × 2,304 (8 megapixels)
- Film speed: ISO 100, 200, 400, 800, 1600
- Recording medium: CompactFlash (CF) (Type I or Type II)

Focusing
- Focus modes: Auto and Manual
- Focus areas: Multi-BASIS TTL, 7 focus points

Exposure/metering
- Exposure modes: Full Auto, Portrait, Landscape, Close-up, Sports, Night Portrait, No Flash, Program, Shutter-priority, Aperture-priority, Manual, Auto Depth-of-field
- Exposure metering: Full aperture TTL, 35-zone
- Metering modes: Evaluative 35-zone, partial 9% at center and center-weighted average

Flash
- Flash: Built-in pop-up with hotshoe (E-TTL II)

Shutter
- Shutter: focal-plane
- Shutter speed range: 1/4000 to 30 sec and Bulb, 1/200 s X-sync
- Continuous shooting: 3 frame/s, 14 JPEG or 5 raw frames

Viewfinder
- Viewfinder: Optical pentamirror 95% coverage, 0.8x magnification

Image processing
- Image processor: DIGIC 2
- White balance: 6 positions & manual preset

General
- LCD screen: 1.8", 115,000 pixels
- Battery: Canon 720mAh Li-Ion NB-2LH
- Dimensions: 126.5 x 94.2 x 64 mm (5.0 x 3.7 x 2.5 inches)
- Weight: 540 g (19 oz) (with battery and card, excluding battery grip)
- Made in: Japan

Chronology
- Predecessor: Canon EOS 300D
- Successor: Canon EOS 400D

The Canon EOS 350D, known in the Americas as the EOS Digital Rebel XT and in Japan as the EOS Kiss Digital N, is an 8.0-megapixel entry-level digital single-lens reflex camera manufactured by Canon. The model was announced in February 2005 and went on sale the following month. Part of the EOS range, it is the successor to the EOS 300D and the predecessor to the EOS 400D (or Digital Rebel XTi), which went on sale in September 2006. The 350D was highly recommended by reviewers and won awards from TIPA and EISA in 2005.

== Details ==
The 350D is the successor to the Canon EOS 300D, which was the first sub-US$1000 digital SLR, introduced in 2003. At launch, the 350D's list price was US$899 in the United States and €899 in Europe for the body alone. Several features that Canon had disabled in the 300D's firmware, and which hackers had restored through unofficial firmware, are available on the 350D, including selectable metering and autofocus modes, flash exposure compensation and mirror lock-up. Other improvements over the 300D include:

- 8.0 megapixels (up from 6.3)
- DIGIC II image processor
- Faster power-on time (0.2 seconds, down from about 3 seconds)
- Faster continuous shooting (3 frames per second, up from 2.5) with a larger buffer (14 JPEG or 5 raw frames, up from 4)
- Smaller and lighter body
- Nine custom functions (the 300D had none)
- E-TTL II flash metering
- USB 2.0 Hi-Speed interface
- Smaller and lighter battery (NB-2LH)

Unlike the 300D, the 350D came with Canon's raw conversion software, Digital Photo Professional.

== Issues ==
In May 2005, Canon and Lexar warned that in extremely rare cases, images could be lost when Lexar Professional 80x-speed CompactFlash cards were used in the 350D and several other Canon digital SLRs. Lexar replaced the affected cards with ones carrying updated firmware.

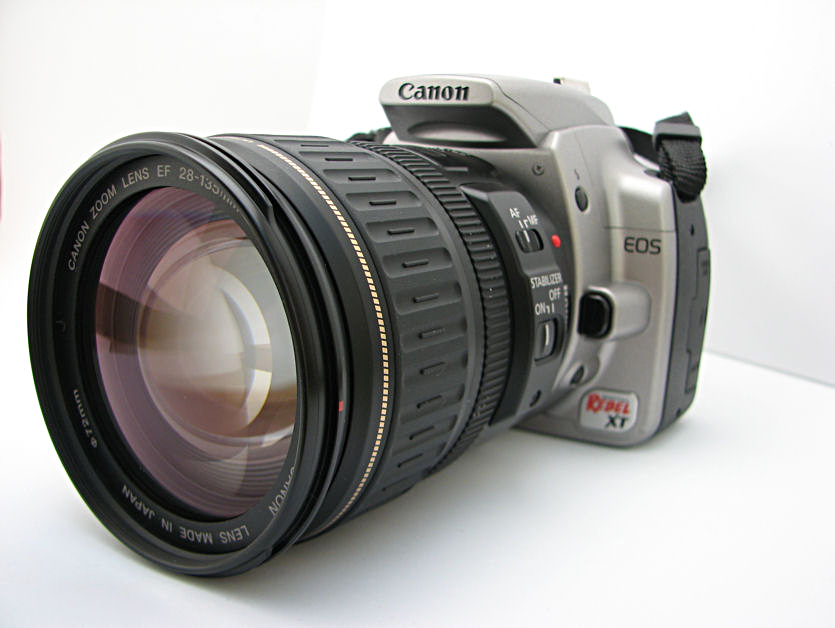
EOS 350D with lens

== Firmware updates ==
The latest firmware released by Canon for the EOS 350D is version 1.0.3 (released 27 October 2005). It fixes problems relating to remote release cables, as well as a problem while reviewing saved images.

== Reception ==
Phil Askey of Digital Photography Review rated the 350D "Highly Recommended", calling it "a great successor to the EOS 300D" with image quality as good as that of the more expensive EOS 20D. He praised its resolution, low image noise, autofocus, fast start-up and continuous shooting, but criticised the lack of spot metering, an LCD monitor that was dim at its default brightness, and the kit lens, which he found soft at small apertures. Imaging Resource also highly recommended the camera, calling it "a technological tour de force", although its reviewer found the small hand grip uncomfortable for larger hands. Both reviews noted that opening the CompactFlash card door switched the camera off, losing any images still in the buffer.

The 350D won the Technical Image Press Association (TIPA) award for best entry-level digital SLR in 2005, and was named European Camera of the Year by the European Imaging and Sound Association (EISA) the same year.

== See also ==
- Canon EF lens mount
- Canon EF-S lens mount

Type	Sensor	Class	00	01	02	03	04	05	06	07	08	09	10	11	12	13	14	15	16	17	18	19	20	21	22	23	24	25	26
DSLR	Full-frame	Flagship				1Ds		1Ds Mk II			1Ds Mk III					1D C													
DSLR	Full-frame	Flagship				1Ds		1Ds Mk II			1Ds Mk III				1D X					1D X Mk II ^{T}			1D X Mk III ^{T}						
DSLR	APS-H	Flagship			1D			1D Mk II	1D Mk II N		1D Mk III		1D Mk IV																
DSLR	Full-frame	Professional																	5DS / 5DS R										
DSLR	Full-frame	Professional							5D			_{x} 5D Mk II			_{x} 5D Mk III					5D Mk IV ^{T}									
DSLR	Full-frame	Advanced														_{x} 6D					_{x} 6D Mk II ^{AT}								
DSLR	APS-C	Advanced											_{x} 7D					_{x} 7D Mk II											
DSLR	APS-C	Mid-range						20Da								_{x} 60Da ^{A}													
DSLR	APS-C	Mid-range		D30	D60	10D		20D	30D		40D	_{x} 50D		_{x} 60D ^{A}			_{x} 70D ^{AT}		80D ^{AT}				90D ^{AT}						
DSLR	APS-C	Mid-range																	760D ^{AT}		77D ^{AT}								
DSLR	APS-C	Entry-level					300D	350D		400D	450D	_{x} 500D	_{x} 550D	_{x} 600D ^{A}		_{x} 650D ^{AT}	_{x} 700D ^{AT}		_{x} 750D ^{AT}		800D ^{AT}			850D ^{AT}					
DSLR	APS-C	Entry-level															_{x} 100D ^{T}		_{x} 200D ^{AT}				250D ^{AT}						
DSLR	APS-C	Entry-level										1000D		_{x} 1100D			_{x} 1200D			1300D		2000D							
DSLR	APS-C	Value																				4000D							
Early models			Canon EOS DCS 5 (1995); Canon EOS DCS 3 (1995); Canon EOS DCS 1 (1995); Canon EOS D2000 (1998); Canon EOS D6000 (1998)																										
Type	Sensor	Spec																											
Type	Sensor	Spec	00	01	02	03	04	05	06	07	08	09	10	11	12	13	14	15	16	17	18	19	20	21	22	23	24	25	26
