= Canon EOS 300D =

2003 APS-C digital single-lens reflex camera

Canon EOS 300D Canon EOS Digital Rebel Canon EOS Kiss Digital
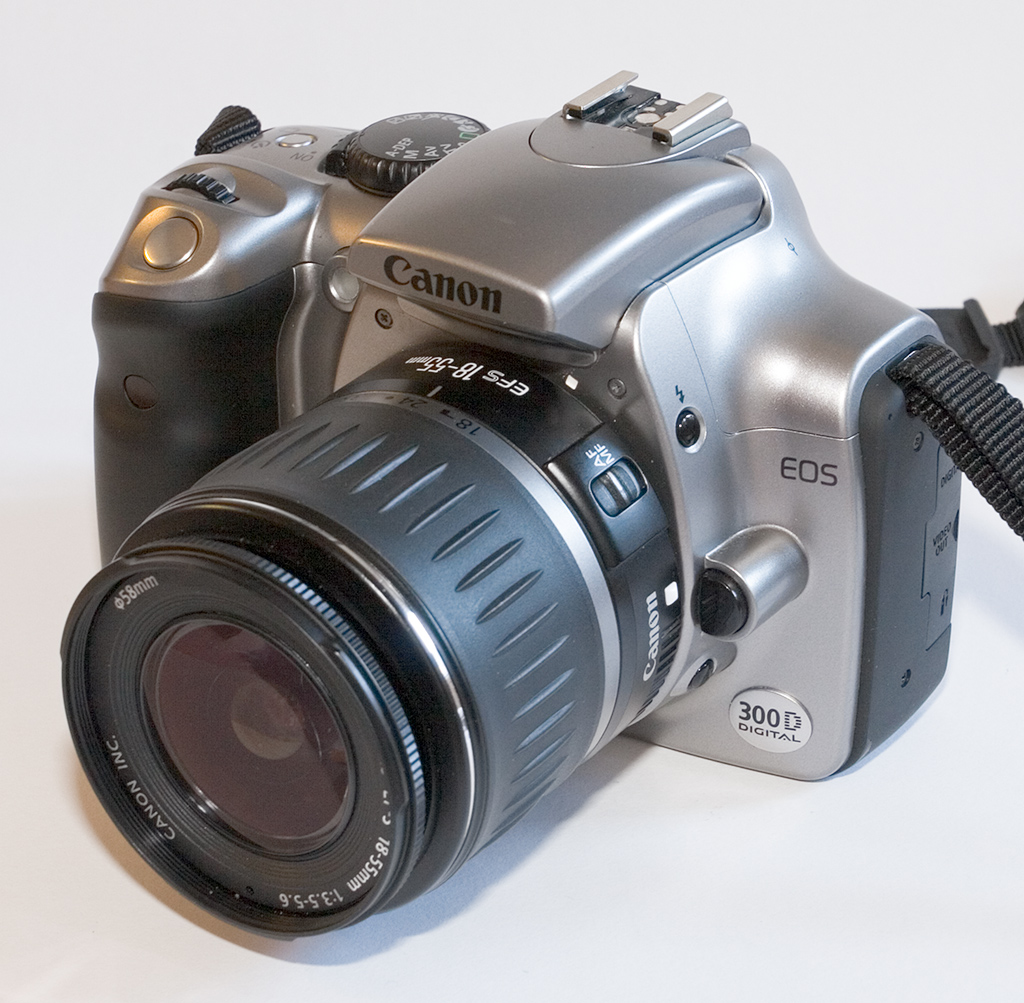

Overview
- Maker: Canon Inc.
- Type: Single-lens reflex

Lens
- Lens mount: Canon EF-S
- Lens: Interchangeable (EF-S, EF)

Sensor/medium
- Sensor: 22.7 mm (0.89 in) ; 15.1 mm (0.59 in) CMOS
- Maximum resolution: 3,072 × 2,048 (6.3 megapixels)
- Film speed: ISO 100–1600
- Storage media: CompactFlash(CF) (Type I and Type II) / max 8 GB

Focusing
- Focus modes: One-shot, AI Servo, AI Focus, Manual
- Focus areas: 7 autofocus points
- Focus bracketing: none

Exposure/metering
- Exposure modes: Full auto, programmed, shutter-priority, aperture priority, manual
- Exposure metering: TTL, evaluative 35-zone, partial, center-weighted
- Metering modes: Evaluative, Partial, C/Wgt Average

Flash
- Flash: Auto pop-up E-TTL auto flash
- Flash bracketing: none

Shutter
- Shutter: Focal-plane shutter, all speeds electronically controlled
- Shutter speed range: 1/4,000 to 30 sec., bulb
- Continuous shooting: 2.5 frame/s, up to 4 frames

Viewfinder
- Viewfinder: Optical, pentamirror, 95% frame coverage, 0.88x magn.

Image processing
- Image processor: DIGIC
- White balance: 6 presets, Auto and custom
- WB bracketing: ±3 levels

General
- LCD screen: 1.8 in (46 mm), 118,000 pixels
- Battery: Li-Ion BP-511/512 rechargeable
- Optional battery packs: BG-E1
- Dimensions: 142×99×72.4 mm (5.59×3.90×2.85 in)
- Weight: 560 g (20 oz) (body only); 649 g (include battery and CF)
- Made in: Japan

Chronology
- Successor: Canon EOS 350D

The Canon EOS 300D (marketed in North America as the EOS Digital Rebel and in Japan as the EOS Kiss Digital; also sold as the DS6041) is a 6.3-megapixel entry-level digital single-lens reflex camera manufactured by Canon. It was initially announced on 20 August 2003 at a price point of US$899 (equivalent to $1,573 in 2025) without lens, US$999 (equivalent to $1,748 in 2025) with the "kit" lens. It is part of the Canon EOS line of cameras. This was a significant milestone in digital cameras, as it was the first digital SLR offered under $1,000.

The 300D was one of the first digital SLR (single lens reflex) cameras that cost less than 1,000 euros (£830 at January 2012 exchange rates).

== Features ==
The 300D is often compared to the prosumer Canon EOS 10D, which features virtually the same CMOS image sensor and image processing chip. Several 10D features can be unlocked and used in the 300D by using non-official firmware.

The 300D polycarbonate bodies were originally available in North America in silver color only, whereas the Japanese version was also available in black. Later, black versions of the 300D were also released in the US and Europe.

The 300D was the first camera to use the Canon EF-S lens mount. It also takes the EF lens mount lenses. Canon introduced the EF-S 18–55mm as the kit lens alongside the 300D. It was available in a USM version in Japan and as a non-USM version elsewhere. Very late production black 300D cameras were available with the USM version in Europe.

Type	Sensor	Class	00	01	02	03	04	05	06	07	08	09	10	11	12	13	14	15	16	17	18	19	20	21	22	23	24	25	26
DSLR	Full-frame	Flagship				1Ds		1Ds Mk II			1Ds Mk III					1D C													
DSLR	Full-frame	Flagship				1Ds		1Ds Mk II			1Ds Mk III				1D X					1D X Mk II ^{T}			1D X Mk III ^{T}						
DSLR	APS-H	Flagship			1D			1D Mk II	1D Mk II N		1D Mk III		1D Mk IV																
DSLR	Full-frame	Professional																	5DS / 5DS R										
DSLR	Full-frame	Professional							5D			_{x} 5D Mk II			_{x} 5D Mk III					5D Mk IV ^{T}									
DSLR	Full-frame	Advanced														_{x} 6D					_{x} 6D Mk II ^{AT}								
DSLR	APS-C	Advanced											_{x} 7D					_{x} 7D Mk II											
DSLR	APS-C	Mid-range						20Da								_{x} 60Da ^{A}													
DSLR	APS-C	Mid-range		D30	D60	10D		20D	30D		40D	_{x} 50D		_{x} 60D ^{A}			_{x} 70D ^{AT}		80D ^{AT}				90D ^{AT}						
DSLR	APS-C	Mid-range																	760D ^{AT}		77D ^{AT}								
DSLR	APS-C	Entry-level					300D	350D		400D	450D	_{x} 500D	_{x} 550D	_{x} 600D ^{A}		_{x} 650D ^{AT}	_{x} 700D ^{AT}		_{x} 750D ^{AT}		800D ^{AT}			850D ^{AT}					
DSLR	APS-C	Entry-level															_{x} 100D ^{T}		_{x} 200D ^{AT}				250D ^{AT}						
DSLR	APS-C	Entry-level										1000D		_{x} 1100D			_{x} 1200D			1300D		2000D							
DSLR	APS-C	Value																				4000D							
Early models			Canon EOS DCS 5 (1995); Canon EOS DCS 3 (1995); Canon EOS DCS 1 (1995); Canon EOS D2000 (1998); Canon EOS D6000 (1998)																										
Type	Sensor	Spec																											
Type	Sensor	Spec	00	01	02	03	04	05	06	07	08	09	10	11	12	13	14	15	16	17	18	19	20	21	22	23	24	25	26
