= 500D =

500D may refer to:

- Canon EOS 500D - a camera
- MD Helicopters MD 500 - a.k.a. Hughes 500D
  - MD 500 Defender - a military version
