= Nikon Coolpix L110 =

Digital camera model

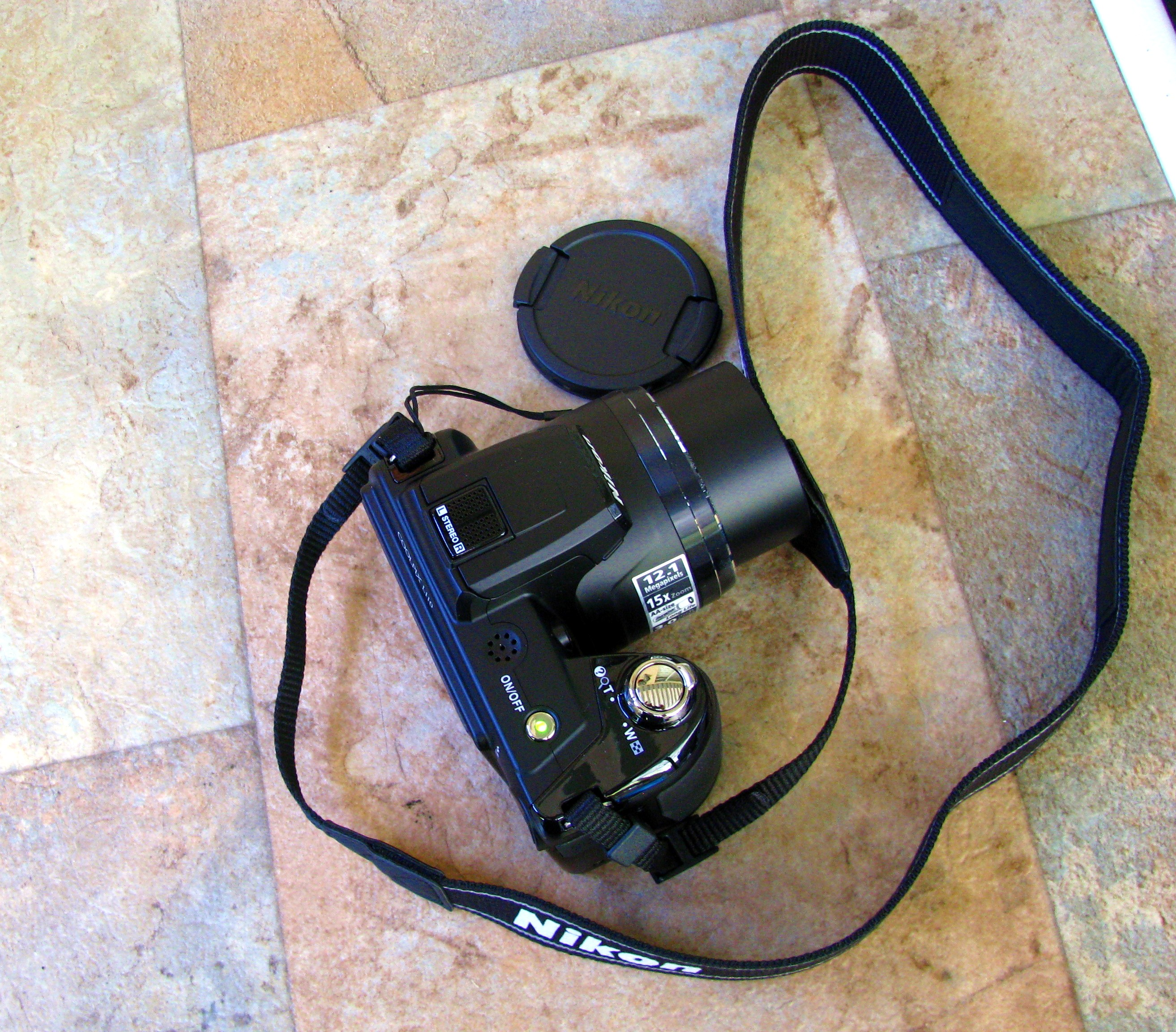

Overview
- Maker: Nikon
- Type: Point-and-shoot

Lens
- Lens: 15x Zoom-Nikkor; f=5.0–75.0mm / F3.5–5.4; Digital zoom: up to 4x;

Sensor/medium
- Sensor: CCD
- Maximum resolution: 4000 × 3000 (12.1 million)
- Film speed: Auto, Auto gain ISO 80–800, 80, 100, 200, 400, 800, 1600, (3200, 6400 with boost)
- Storage media: Internal (43 MB); SD/MMC(SDHC-compliant) card (optional)

Exposure/metering
- Exposure metering: 256-segment matrix metering Center-weighted metering Spot metering

Flash
- Flash: Built-in

Shutter
- Continuous shooting: Yes (Continuous (approx. 1 frame/s up to 4 shots); Multi-shot 16 (16 frames with a single burst)

Viewfinder
- Viewfinder: No

General
- LCD screen: 3.0", 460,000 pixel TFT
- Battery: 4 alkaline/lithium battery AA batteries
- Optional battery packs: 4 Nikon NiMH AA batteries 4 Li-ion AA batteries 4 Rechargeable Ni-MH Battery EN-MH2; AC Adaptor EH-67
- Data port: USB 2.0 (480 Mbit/sec)
- Weight: 406 g (without batteries and memory card)
- Made in: Japan

NIKON COOLPIX L110 is a compact point-and-shoot digital camera produced by Nikon. It is branded as part of the "Life" or "L-series" cameras in the Coolpix family. It has a 12.1 megapixel maximum resolution, 3.0" TFT LCD monitor, 15x Optical Zoom, D-Lighting, Vibration Reduction and Face-priority AF. It comes with 1 cm macro and 15 scene modes inbuilt functions. It also records High Definition video.

== Sample Photos ==
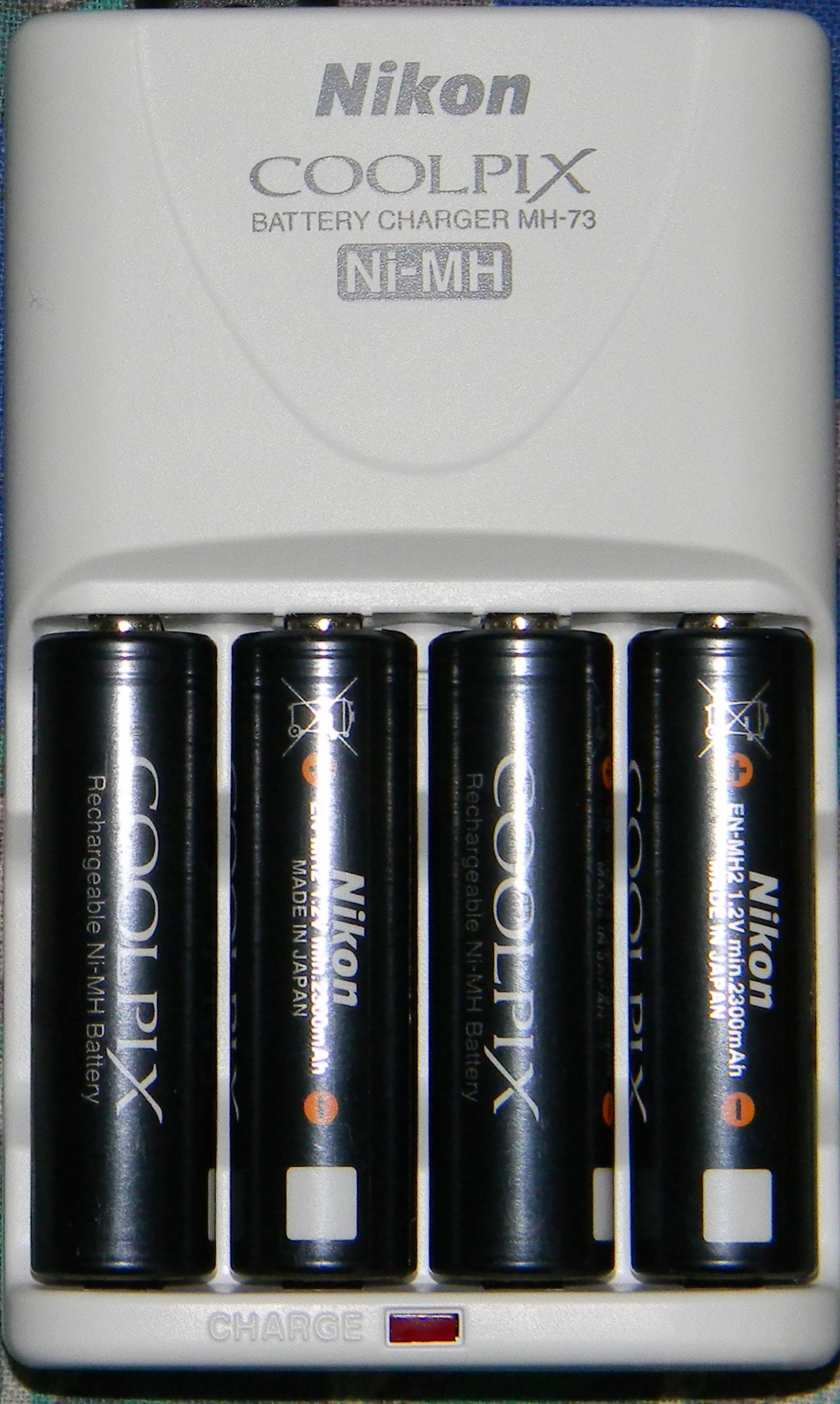
Nikon Coolpix L110 Battery Charger(MH-73) with Rechargeable Ni-MH Batteries EN-MH2-B4 Set.

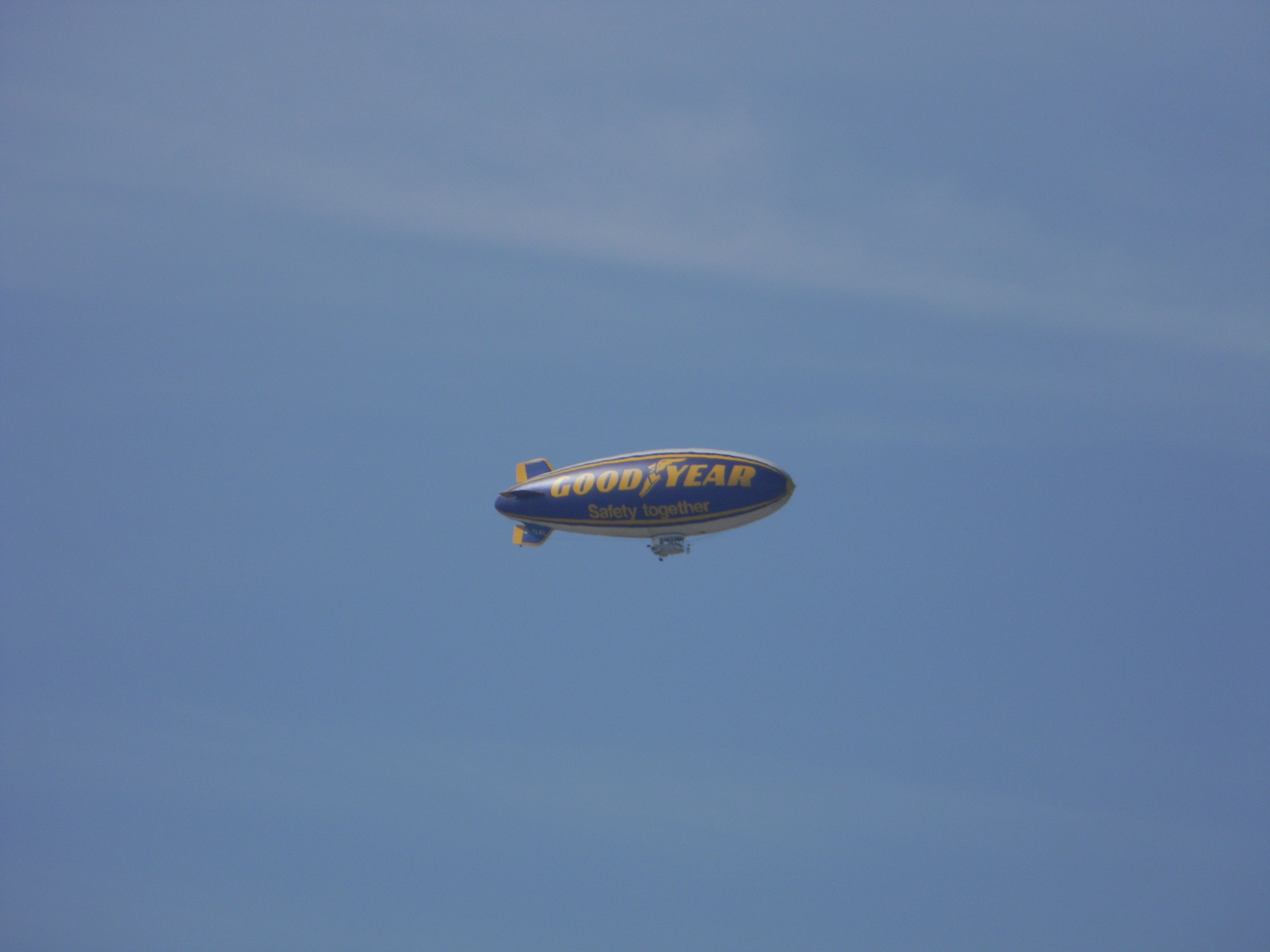
Photograph of a Goodyear Blimp taken with a Nikon Coolpix L110

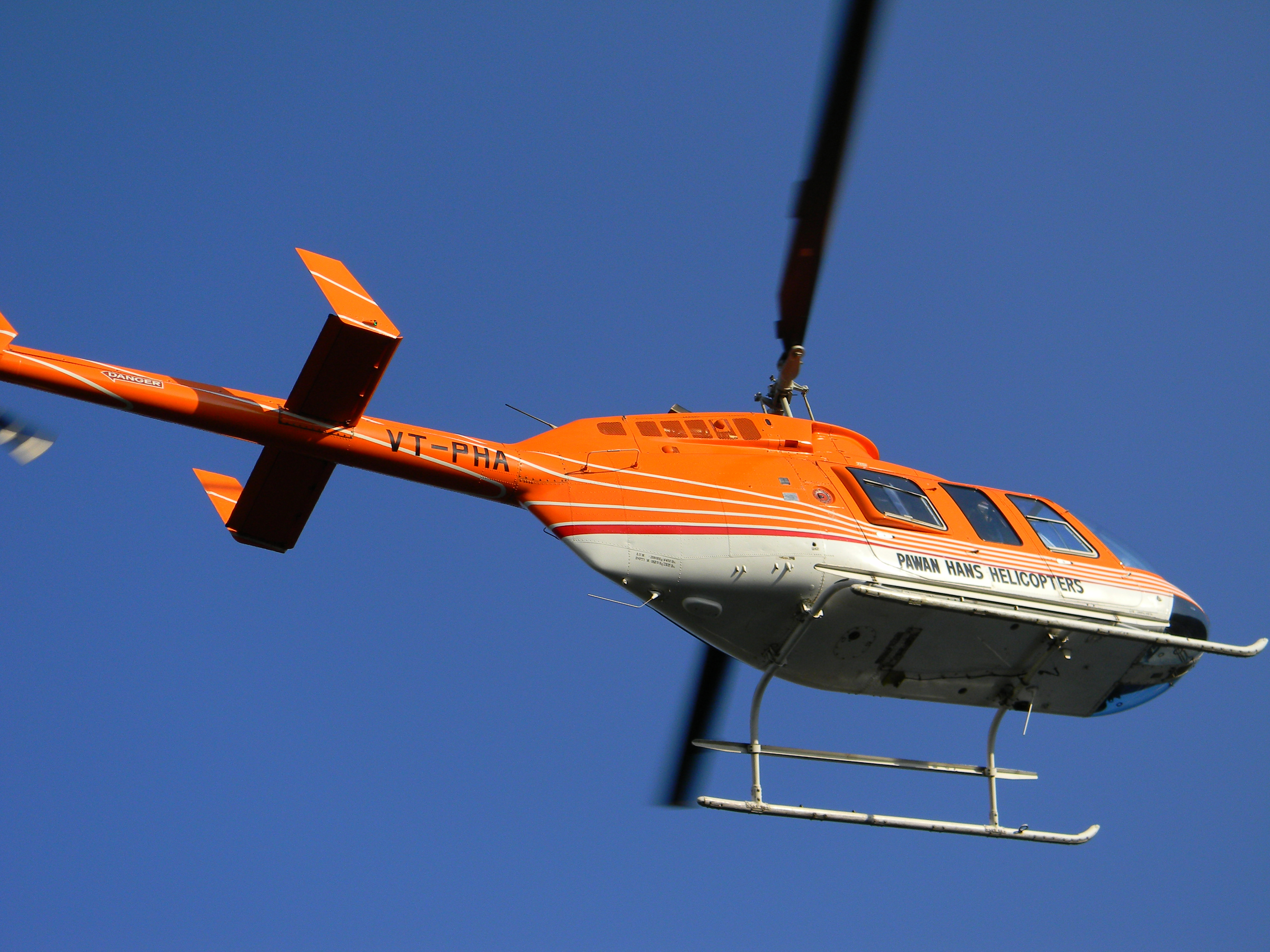

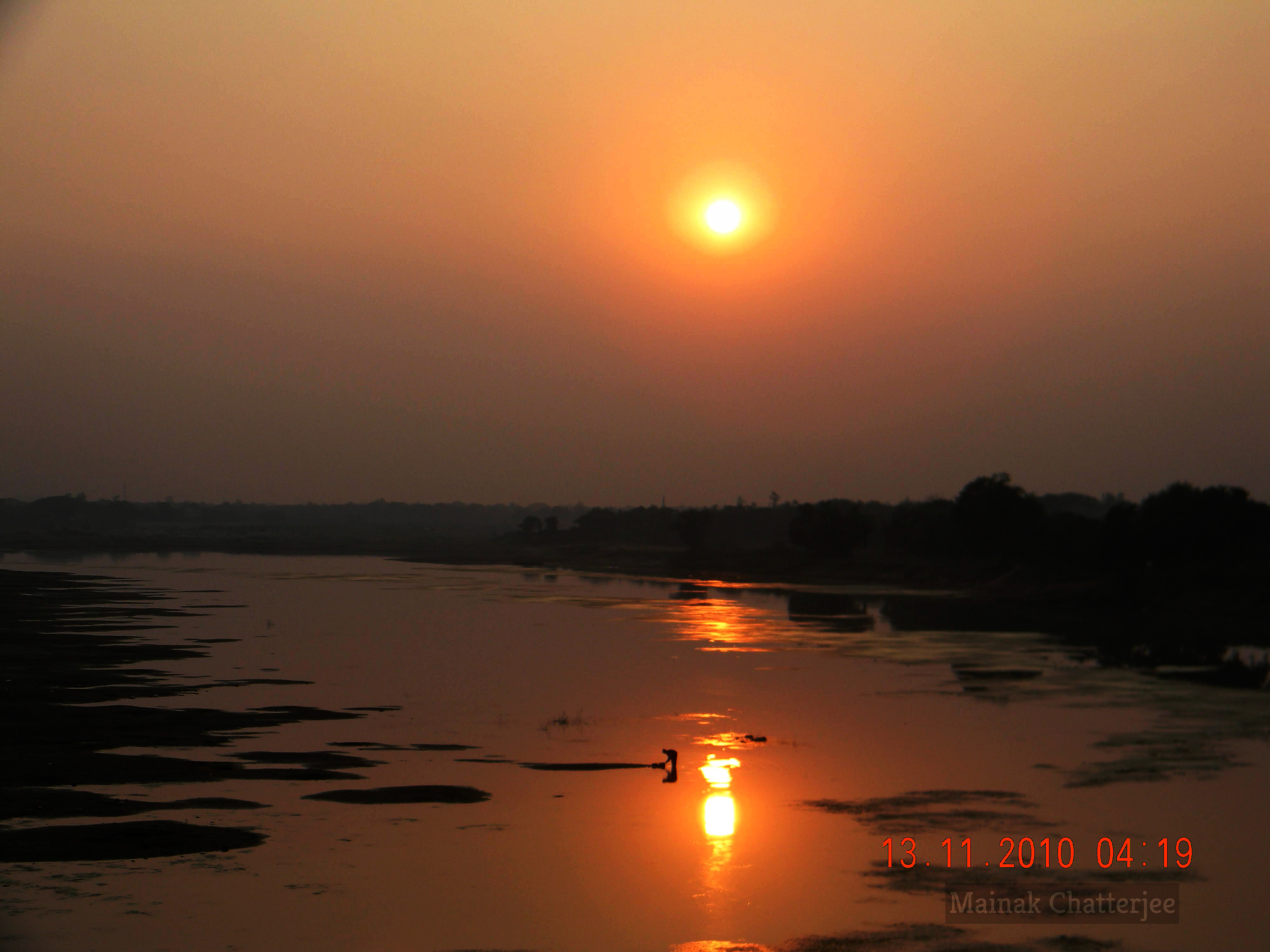
