= Canon EOS 400D =

2006 APS-C digital single-lens reflex camera

Canon EOS 400D Canon EOS Digital Rebel XTi Canon EOS Kiss Digital X
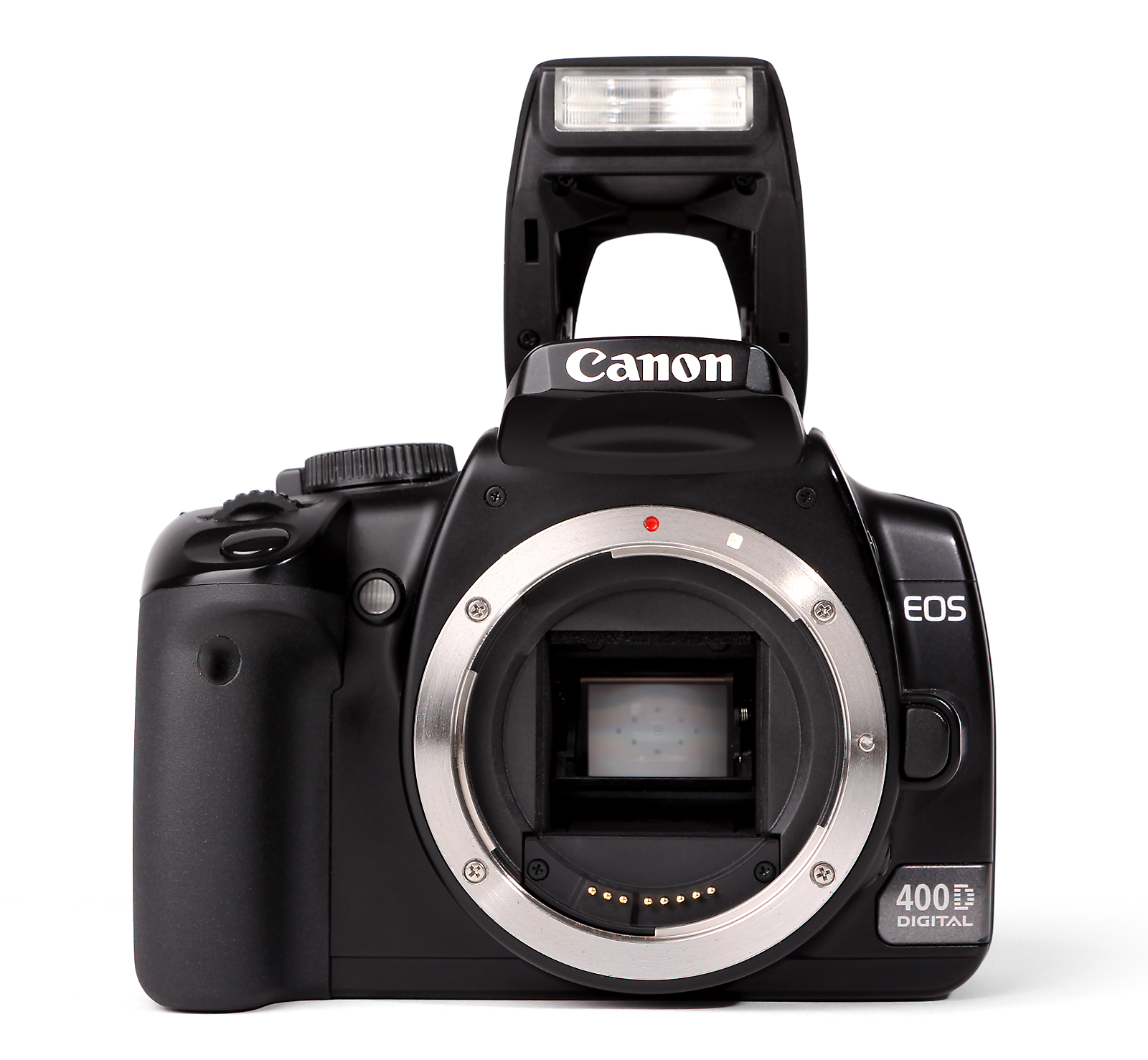

Overview
- Maker: Canon Inc.
- Type: Digital single lens reflex camera

Lens
- Lens mount: Canon EF-S
- Lens: Interchangeable

Sensor/medium
- Sensor: CMOS APS-C 22.2 mm × 14.8 mm (1.6× conversion factor)
- Maximum resolution: 10.1 effective megapixels, 3,888 × 2,592
- Film speed: ISO 100 to 1600
- Storage media: CompactFlash Card Type I & II

Focusing
- Focus modes: One-Shot, Predictive AI Servo, automatic switching autofocus; Manual Focus
- Focus areas: 9 AF points

Exposure/metering
- Exposure modes: Automatic shiftable Program, Shutter-priority, Aperture-priority, Auto Depth-of-field, Full auto, Programmed modes, Manual, E-TTL II autoflash program AE
- Exposure metering: Full aperture TTL, 35-zone SPC
- Metering modes: Evaluative, partial (approx. 9% at center of viewfinder), center-weighted average

Flash
- Flash: E-TTL II automatic built-in pop-up, 13 m ISO 100 guide number, 27 mm (equivalent in 35 format) lens focal length coverage; compatible with Canon EX Series Speedlite external hot shoe-mount flashes

Shutter
- Shutter: Focal-plane, vertical travel, mechanical
- Shutter speed range: 1/4000 s to 30 s, bulb, 1/200 s X-sync
- Continuous shooting: 3 frames/s for 27 JPEG frames or 10 raw frames

Viewfinder
- Viewfinder: Eye-level pentamirror SLR, 95% coverage, 0.8× magnification

Image processing
- Image processor: DIGIC 2
- White balance: Auto, Daylight, Shade, Cloudy, Tungsten Light, White Fluorescent Light, Flash, Manual, user-set
- WB bracketing: +/- 3 stops in 1-stop increments

General
- LCD screen: 2.5 in (6.4 cm) color TFT LCD, 160° viewing angle, 230,000 pixels
- Battery: NB-2LH Battery Pack
- Dimensions: 126.5 mm × 94.2 mm × 65 mm (4.98 in × 3.71 in × 2.56 in) (W × H × D)
- Weight: 510 g (18 oz) (body only)
- Made in: Japan

Chronology
- Predecessor: Canon EOS 350D
- Successor: Canon EOS 450D

The EOS 400D, called Digital Rebel XTi in North America and EOS Kiss Digital X in Japan, is an entry-level digital single-lens reflex camera introduced by Canon on 24 August 2006.

== Details ==
It is the successor of the Canon EOS 350D, and upgrades to a 10.1 megapixel CMOS sensor, a larger continuous shooting buffer, an integrated image sensor vibrating cleaning system (first used in a Canon EOS DSLR), a more precise nine-point autofocus system from the EOS 30D, improved grip, and a bigger 2.5-inch (64 mm) LCD with 230,000 pixels and a larger viewing angle which replaces the top status screen.

The 400D uses the DIGIC II image processor, as is used in the 350D. The 400D file numbering system holds 9,999 pictures, as opposed to 100 photos in one folder with the 350D. Support for the Media Transfer Protocol (MTP) USB protocol is available since version 1.1.0. The latest firmware available is version 1.1.1.

It was succeeded by the Canon EOS 450D (Rebel XSi in North America) which was announced at the PMA show in January 2008 with sales commencing in April 2008.

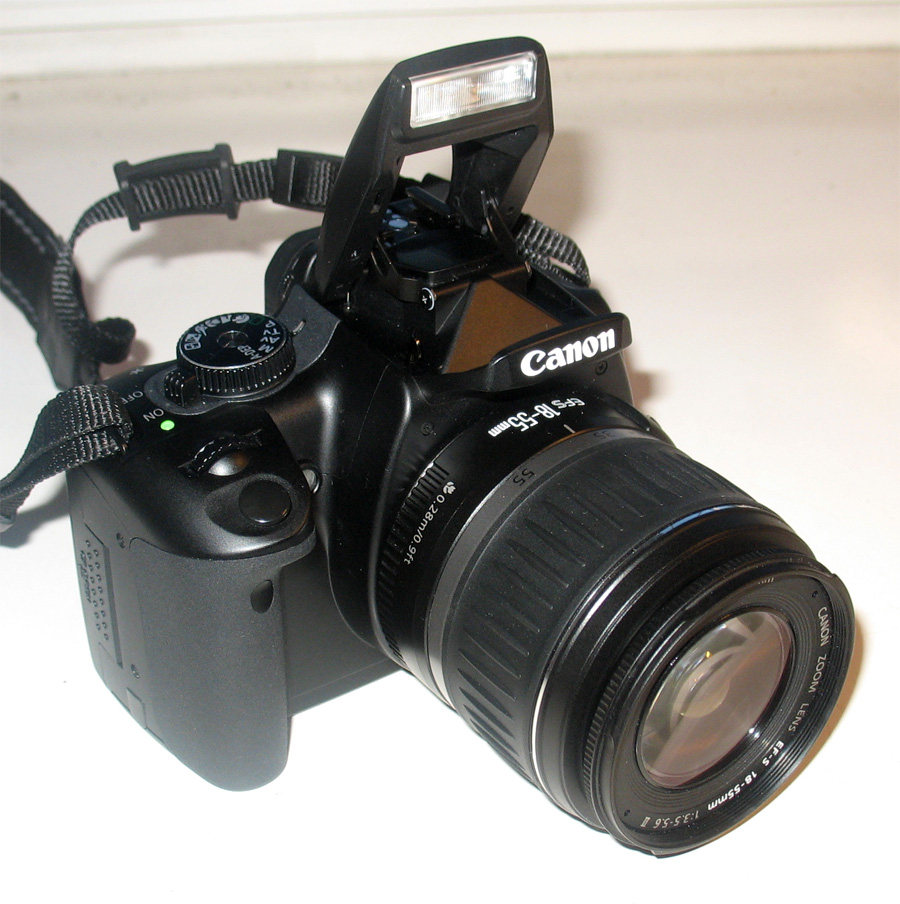
The Canon EOS 400D with kit lens EF-S 18-55mm and neck strap

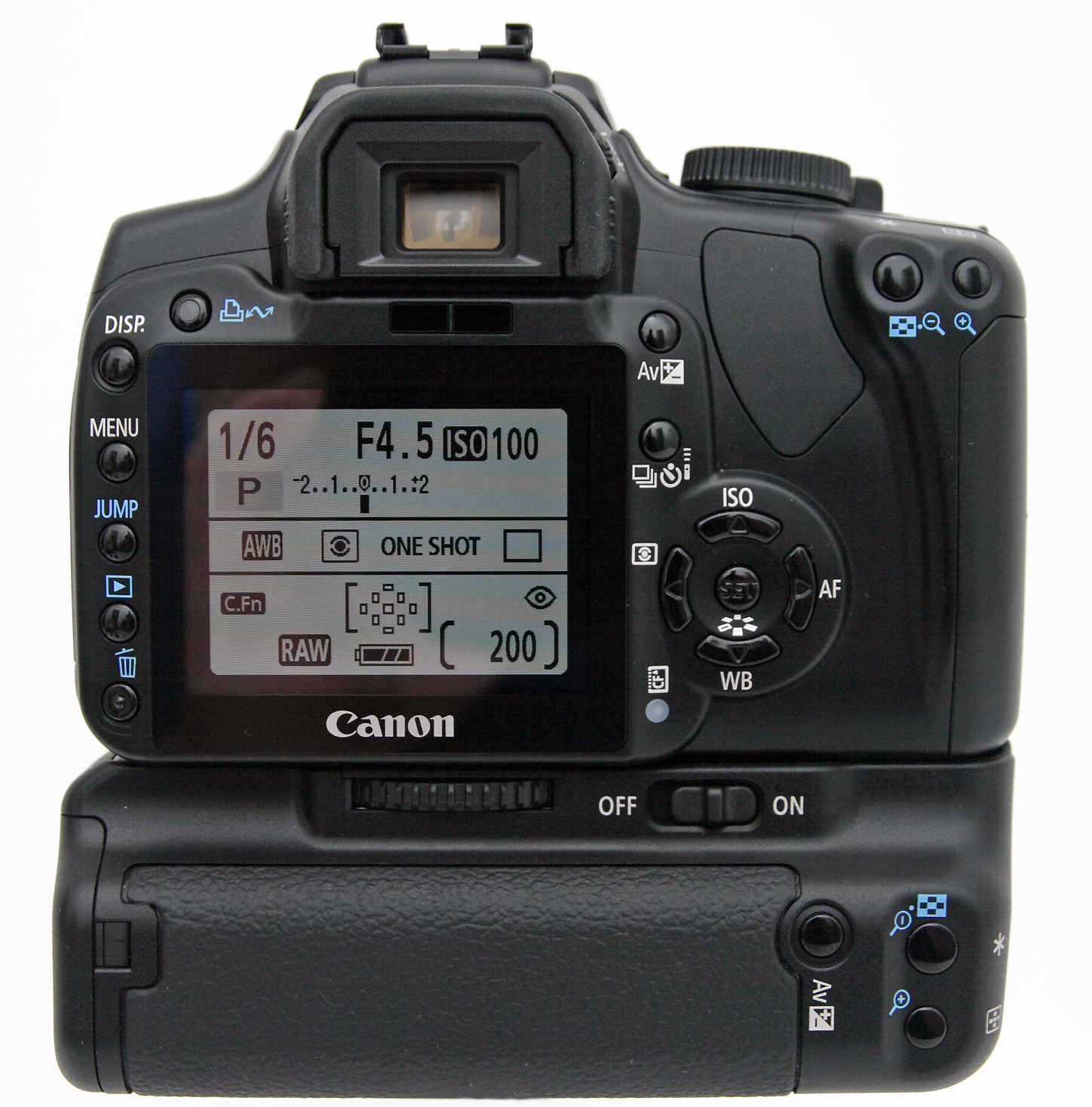
The 400D features a 2.5" TFT LCD (shown with optional battery grip)

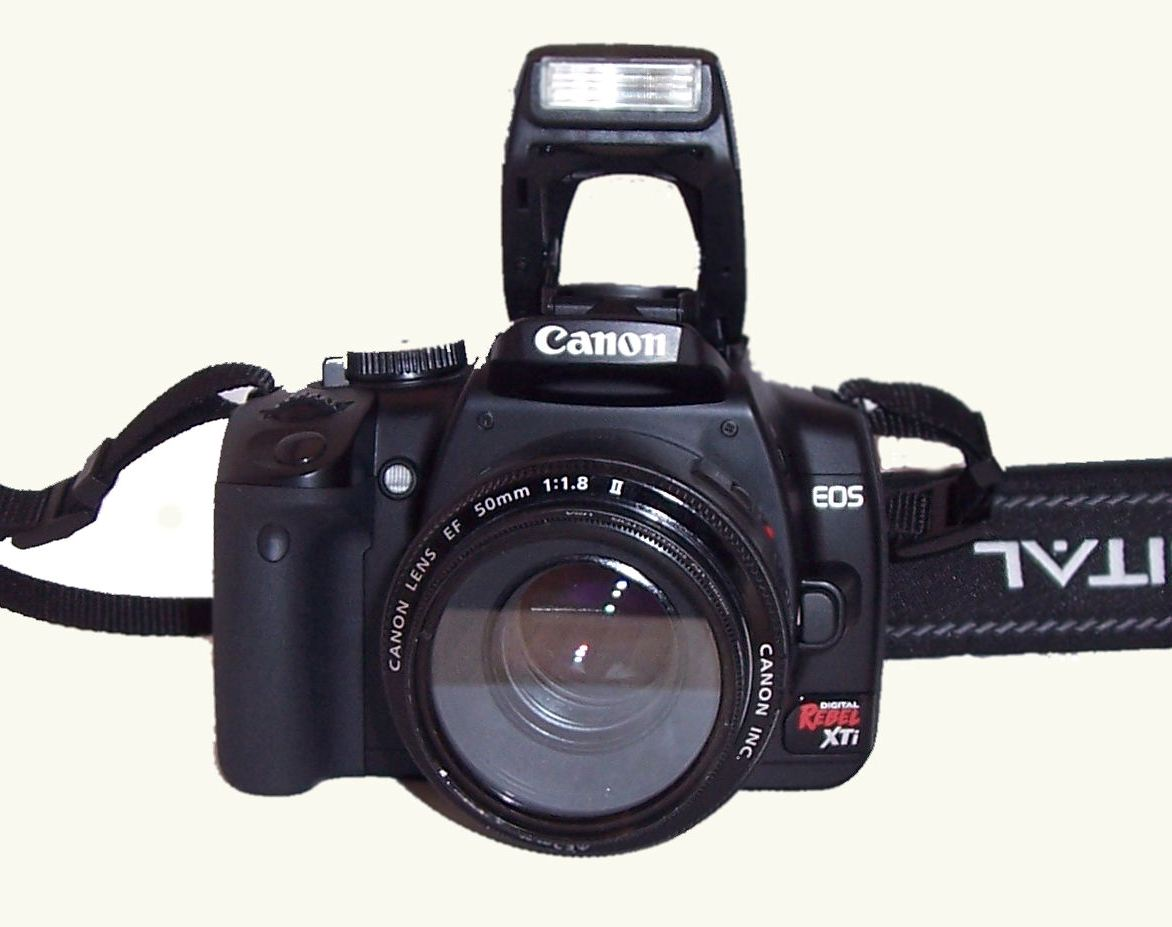
A Canon EOS 400D with the EF 50 mm f/1.8 II lens

== Custom firmware ==
400plus is a firmware add-on which offers additional functionality for Canon 400D, such as intervalometer and custom autofocus patterns.

== See also ==
- Canon EF lens mount
- Canon EF-S lens mount
- Canon EOS

| Type | Sensor | Class | 00 | 01 | 02 | 03 | 04 | 05 | 06 | 07 | 08 | 09 | 10 | 11 | 12 | 13 | 14 | 15 | 16 | 17 | 18 | 19 | 20 | 21 | 22 | 23 | 24 | 25 |
|---|---|---|---|---|---|---|---|---|---|---|---|---|---|---|---|---|---|---|---|---|---|---|---|---|---|---|---|---|
| DSLR | Full-frame | Flagship | | | | 1Ds | | 1Ds Mk II | | | 1Ds Mk III | | | | | 1D C | | | | | | | | | | | | |
| DSLR | Full-frame | Flagship | | | | 1Ds | | 1Ds Mk II | | | 1Ds Mk III | | | | 1D X | | | | | 1D X Mk II ^{T} | | | 1D X Mk III ^{T} | | | | | |
| DSLR | APS-H | Flagship | | | 1D | | | 1D Mk II | 1D Mk II N | | 1D Mk III | | 1D Mk IV | | | | | | | | | | | | | | | |
| DSLR | Full-frame | Professional | | | | | | | | | | | | | | | | | 5DS / 5DS R | | | | | | | | | |
| DSLR | Full-frame | Professional | | | | | | | 5D | | | _{x} 5D Mk II | | | _{x} 5D Mk III | | | | | 5D Mk IV ^{T} | | | | | | | | |
| DSLR | Full-frame | Advanced | | | | | | | | | | | | | | _{x} 6D | | | | | _{x} 6D Mk II ^{AT} | | | | | | | |
| DSLR | APS-C | Advanced | | | | | | | | | | | _{x} 7D | | | | | _{x} 7D Mk II | | | | | | | | | | |
| DSLR | APS-C | Mid-range | | | | | | 20Da | | | | | | | | _{x} 60Da ^{A} | | | | | | | | | | | | |
| DSLR | APS-C | Mid-range | | D30 | D60 | 10D | | 20D | 30D | | 40D | _{x} 50D | | _{x} 60D ^{A} | | _{x} 70D ^{AT} | | 80D ^{AT} | | | | | 90D ^{AT} | | | | | |
| DSLR | APS-C | Mid-range | | | | | | | | | | | | | | | | | 760D ^{AT} | | 77D ^{AT} | | | | | | | |
| DSLR | APS-C | Entry-level | | | | | 300D | 350D | | 400D | 450D | _{x} 500D | _{x} 550D | _{x} 600D ^{A} | | _{x} 650D ^{AT} | _{x} 700D ^{AT} | | _{x} 750D ^{AT} | | 800D ^{AT} | | | 850D ^{AT} | | | | |
| DSLR | APS-C | Entry-level | | | | | | | | | | | | | | | _{x} 100D ^{T} | | _{x} 200D ^{AT} | | | | 250D ^{AT} | | | | | |
| DSLR | APS-C | Entry-level | | | | | | | | | | 1000D | | _{x} 1100D | | | _{x} 1200D | | | 1300D | | 2000D | | | | | | |
| DSLR | APS-C | Value | | | | | | | | | | | | | | | | | | | | 4000D | | | | | | |
| Early models | | | Canon EOS DCS 5 (1995); Canon EOS DCS 3 (1995); Canon EOS DCS 1 (1995); Canon EOS D2000 (1998); Canon EOS D6000 (1998) | | | | | | | | | | | | | | | | | | | | | | | | | |
| Type | Sensor | Spec | | | | | | | | | | | | | | | | | | | | | | | | | | |
| Type | Sensor | Spec | 00 | 01 | 02 | 03 | 04 | 05 | 06 | 07 | 08 | 09 | 10 | 11 | 12 | 13 | 14 | 15 | 16 | 17 | 18 | 19 | 20 | 21 | 22 | 23 | 24 | 25 |
