= Canon EOS 300V =

2002 35mm single-lens reflex camera

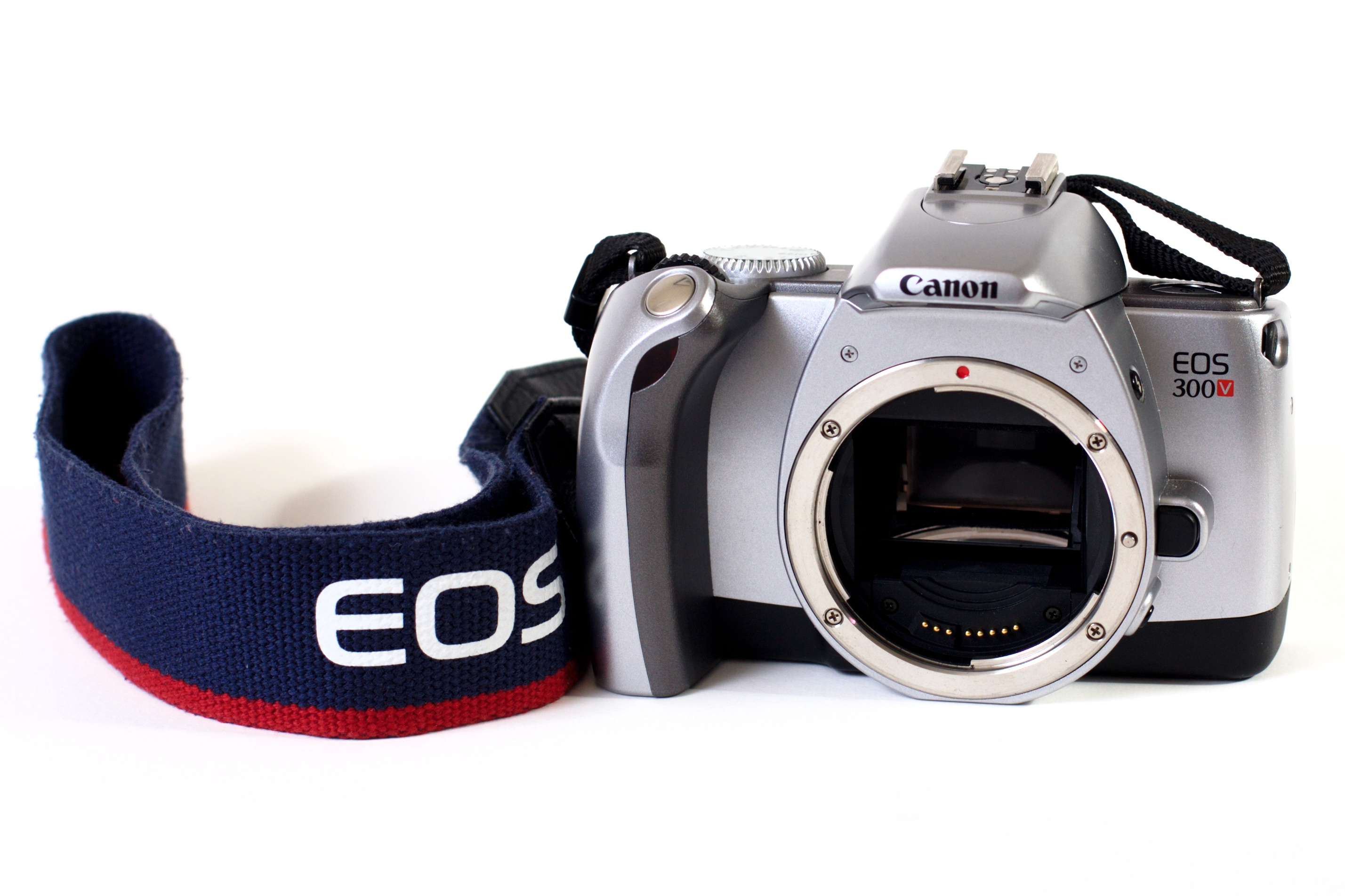

Overview
- Maker: Canon Inc.
- Type: Single-lens reflex
- Released: September 2002

Lens
- Lens mount: Canon EF
- Lens: Interchangeable

Sensor/medium
- Film format: 135 film
- Film size: 36×24 mm

Focusing
- Focus: TTL Phase Detection autofocus

Exposure/metering
- Exposure: Program, Aperture priority, Shutter priority and depth-of-field autoexposure; match-needle manual 35 zone evaluative, Centre-weighted or 9.5% partial metering

Flash
- Flash: Hot shoe and built-in
- Flash synchronization: 1/90s

Shutter
- Frame rate: 2.5 frame/s
- Shutter: Mechanical focal-plane shutter
- Shutter speed range: 30s – 1/2000s

Viewfinder
- Viewfinder: Fixed eye-level pentaprism
- Viewfinder magnification: 0.7×
- Frame coverage: 90%

General
- Dimensions: 130×88×64 mm (5.1×3.5×2.5 in)
- Weight: 365 g (12.9 oz) (body only)

Chronology
- Replaced: Canon EOS 300
- Replaced by: Canon EOS 300X

References
- "EOS Rebel Ti". Canon Camera Museum.

The Canon EOS 300V (Kiss 5/All New Kiss in Japan and Rebel Ti in North America) was a 135 film auto-focus SLR camera introduced by Canon in 2002 to upgrade Canon's EOS Rebel series of autofocus consumer SLR cameras.

Upon its release, the Rebel Ti had the fastest autofocus and most advanced autoexposure in its class. Among the more welcomed improvements was the new stainless steel lens mount, replacing the less durable plastic mount found on previous EOS Rebel cameras.

Class	1987	1988	1989	1990	1991	1992	1993	1994	1995	1996	1997	1998	1999	2000	2001	2002	2003	2004	2005	2006	2007	…	2018
Professional				1					1N					1V									
Professional				RT					1N RS														
High-end				10			5						3										
Advanced		620		600		100				50					30				30V				
Midrange	650				1000F	1000F N		500			500N			300			300V		300X				
Entry-level		750	850	700					5000				3000			3000N		3000V					
Entry-level											IX												
Entry-level												IX 7											
