= Canon EOS 450D =

2008 APS-C digital single-lens reflex camera

Canon EOS 450D Canon EOS Rebel XSi Canon EOS Kiss X2
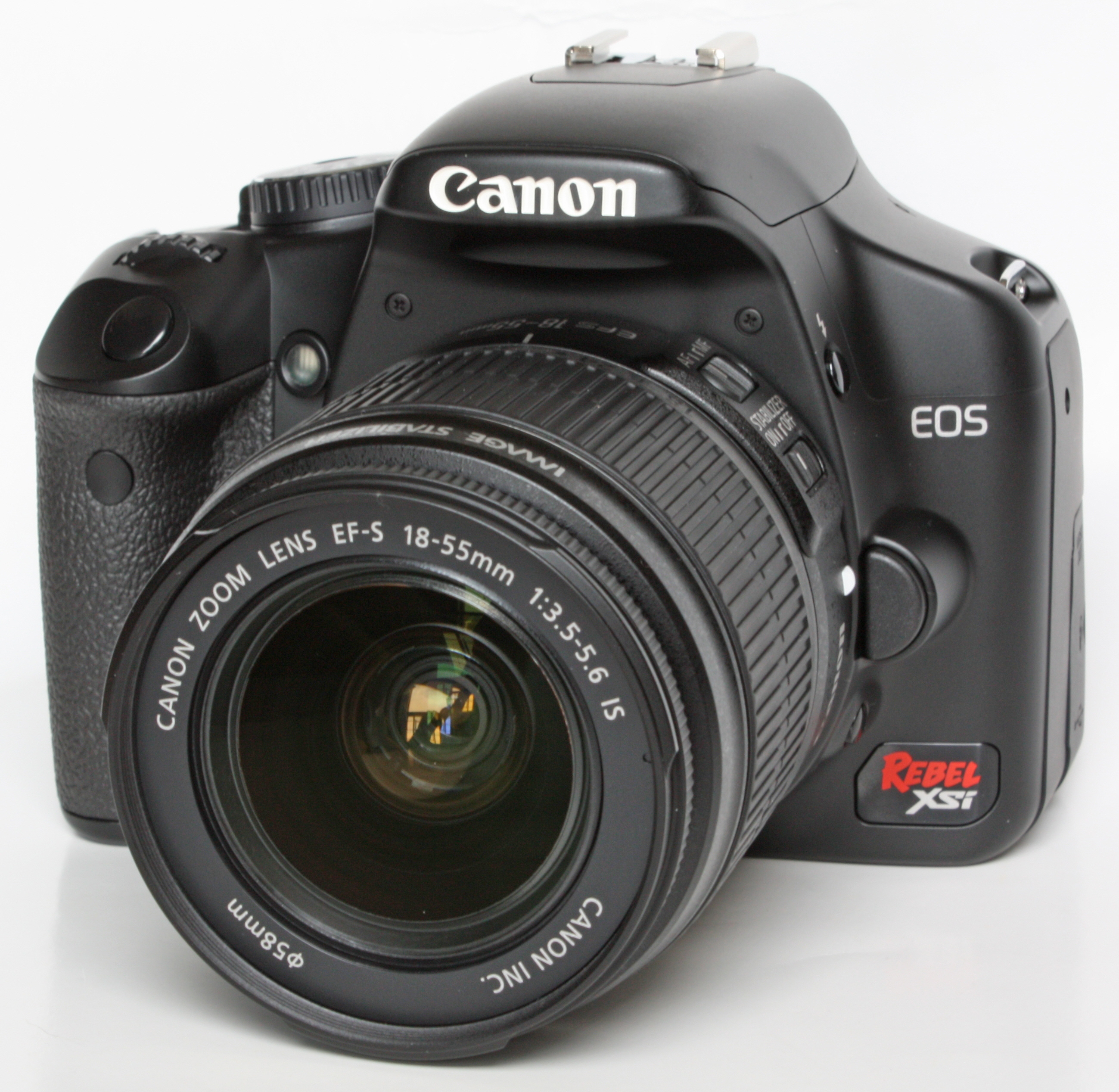

Overview
- Maker: Canon Inc.
- Type: Digital single-lens reflex camera
- Released: March 2008

Lens
- Lens mount: Canon EF-S
- Lens: Interchangeable

Sensor/medium
- Sensor: CMOS APS-C 22.2 mm × 14.8 mm (1.6× conversion factor)
- Maximum resolution: 12.2 effective megapixels, 4,272 × 2,848
- Film speed: ISO 100 to 1600
- Storage media: Secure Digital card Secure Digital High Capacity

Focusing
- Focus modes: One-shot, predictive AI servo, automatic switching autofocus; manual focus
- Focus areas: 9 AF points

Exposure/metering
- Exposure modes: Automatic shiftable programme, shutter-priority, aperture-priority, auto depth-of-field, full auto, programmed modes, manual, E-TTL II autoflash, programme AE
- Exposure metering: Full aperture TTL, 35-zone SPC
- Metering modes: Spot, evaluative, partial (approx. 9% at center of viewfinder), centre-weighted average

Flash
- Flash: E-TTL II automatic built-in pop-up, 13 m ISO 100 guide number, 27 mm (equivalent in 35 format) lens focal length coverage; compatible with Canon EX Series Speedlite external hotshoe-mount flashes

Shutter
- Shutter: focal-plane, vertical travel, mechanical
- Shutter speed range: 1/4000 s to 30 s, 1/200 s X-sync
- Continuous shooting: 3.5 frames/s for 53 JPEG frames or 6 raw frames

Viewfinder
- Viewfinder: Eye-level pentamirror SLR, 95% coverage, 0.87× magnification

Image processing
- Image processor: DIGIC III
- White balance: Auto, daylight, shade, cloudy, tungsten light, white fluorescent light, flash, manual, user-set
- WB bracketing: ±3 stops in 1-stop increments

General
- LCD screen: 3.0 in (76 mm) color TFT LCD, 230,000 pixels
- Battery: LP-E5 battery pack
- Dimensions: 128.8 mm × 97.5 mm × 61.9 mm (5.07 in × 3.84 in × 2.44 in) (W × H × D)
- Weight: 475 g (16.8 oz) (body only)
- Made in: Japan

Chronology
- Predecessor: Canon EOS 400D
- Successor: Canon EOS 500D

The EOS 450D, known in the Americas as the EOS Rebel XSi and in Japan as the EOS Kiss X2, is a 12.2-megapixel digital single-lens reflex camera that is part of the Canon EOS line of cameras. It is the successor to the EOS 400D/Digital Rebel XTi. It was announced on 23 January 2008 and released in March 2008 and April 2008 in North America. It was succeeded by the Canon EOS 500D (Rebel T1i in North America) which was announced on 25 March 2009.

Like its predecessors, it takes EF and EF-S lenses as well as a large selection of EOS system accessories. The 450D is the first Canon EOS model to exclusively use SD and SDHC card storage instead of CompactFlash.

== Features ==
- 12.2-megapixel CMOS sensor.
- DIGIC III image processor
- 14-bit analog-to-digital signal conversion
- 3.0-inch (76 mm) LCD monitor
- Live View mode
- Nine-point AF with centre cross-type sensors
- Four metering modes, using 35-zones: spot, partial, center-weighted average, and evaluative metering.
- Built-in flash
- Auto lighting optimiser
- Highlight tone priority
- EOS integrated cleaning system
- sRGB and Adobe RGB color spaces
- ISO 100–1600 (separate ISO button similar to the Canon EOS-1D professional series)
- Continuous drive up to 3.5 frames per second (53 images (JPEG), 6 images (raw))
- Canon EF/EF-S lenses
- Canon EX Speedlites
- PAL/NTSC video output
- SD and SDHC memory card file storage 32 GB max
- File Formats include: JPEG, raw (14-bit, Canon original, 2nd edition)
- Raw and large JPEG simultaneous recording
- USB 2.0 computer interface
- LP-E5 battery
- Optional BG-E5 battery grip
- Approximate weight 0.475 kg (16.8 oz)

Type	Sensor	Class	00	01	02	03	04	05	06	07	08	09	10	11	12	13	14	15	16	17	18	19	20	21	22	23	24	25
DSLR	Full-frame	Flagship				1Ds		1Ds Mk II			1Ds Mk III					1D C												
DSLR	Full-frame	Flagship				1Ds		1Ds Mk II			1Ds Mk III				1D X					1D X Mk II ^{T}			1D X Mk III ^{T}					
DSLR	APS-H	Flagship			1D			1D Mk II	1D Mk II N		1D Mk III		1D Mk IV															
DSLR	Full-frame	Professional																	5DS / 5DS R									
DSLR	Full-frame	Professional							5D			_{x} 5D Mk II			_{x} 5D Mk III					5D Mk IV ^{T}								
DSLR	Full-frame	Advanced														_{x} 6D					_{x} 6D Mk II ^{AT}							
DSLR	APS-C	Advanced											_{x} 7D					_{x} 7D Mk II										
DSLR	APS-C	Mid-range						20Da								_{x} 60Da ^{A}												
DSLR	APS-C	Mid-range		D30	D60	10D		20D	30D		40D	_{x} 50D		_{x} 60D ^{A}		_{x} 70D ^{AT}		80D ^{AT}					90D ^{AT}					
DSLR	APS-C	Mid-range																	760D ^{AT}		77D ^{AT}							
DSLR	APS-C	Entry-level					300D	350D		400D	450D	_{x} 500D	_{x} 550D	_{x} 600D ^{A}		_{x} 650D ^{AT}	_{x} 700D ^{AT}		_{x} 750D ^{AT}		800D ^{AT}			850D ^{AT}				
DSLR	APS-C	Entry-level															_{x} 100D ^{T}		_{x} 200D ^{AT}				250D ^{AT}					
DSLR	APS-C	Entry-level										1000D		_{x} 1100D			_{x} 1200D			1300D		2000D						
DSLR	APS-C	Value																				4000D						
Early models			Canon EOS DCS 5 (1995); Canon EOS DCS 3 (1995); Canon EOS DCS 1 (1995); Canon EOS D2000 (1998); Canon EOS D6000 (1998)																									
Type	Sensor	Spec																										
Type	Sensor	Spec	00	01	02	03	04	05	06	07	08	09	10	11	12	13	14	15	16	17	18	19	20	21	22	23	24	25
