= Pentaprism =

Five-sided reflecting prism

A pentaprism.

A perspective drawing showing a roof pentaprism commonly used in a single lens reflex camera (SLR). The image is flipped laterally by the prism.

A pentaprism is a five-sided reflecting prism used to deviate a beam of light by a constant 90°, even if the entry beam is not at 90° to the prism. The beam reflects inside the prism twice, allowing the transmission of an image through a right angle without inverting it (that is, without changing the image's handedness) as an ordinary right-angle prism or mirror would.

The reflections inside the prism are not caused by total internal reflection, since the beams are incident at an angle less than the critical angle (the minimum angle for total internal reflection). Instead, the two faces are coated to provide mirror surfaces. The two opposite transmitting faces are often coated with an antireflection coating to reduce spurious reflections. The fifth face of the prism is not used optically but truncates what would otherwise be an awkward angle joining the two mirrored faces.

== In cameras ==
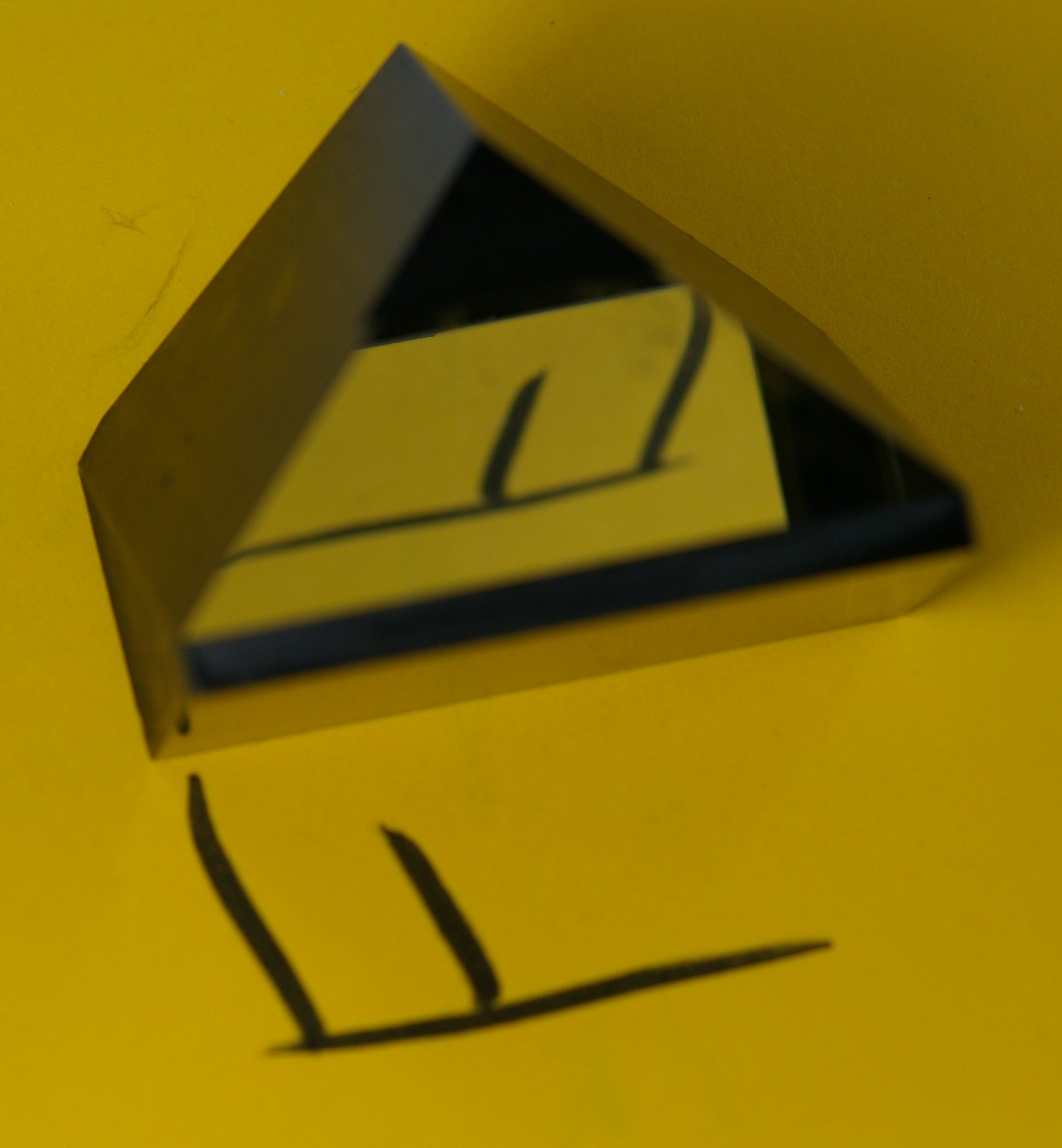
An image as seen through a roof pentaprism. This is looking in through the eyepiece plane.

A variant of this prism is the roof pentaprism which is commonly used in the viewfinder of single-lens reflex cameras. The camera lens renders an image that is both vertically and laterally reversed, and the reflex mirror re-inverts it leaving an image laterally reversed. In this case, the image needs to be reflected left-to-right as the prism transmits the image formed on the camera's focusing screen. This lateral inversion is done by replacing one of the reflective faces of a normal pentaprism with a "roof" section, with two additional surfaces angled towards each other and meeting at 90°, which laterally reverses the image back to normal. Reflex cameras with waist-level finders (viewed from above), including many medium format cameras, display a laterally reversed image directly from the focusing screen which is viewed from above.

=== Compared to the pentamirror ===
The same optical paths can be realized with three mirrors, in an arrangement called the pentamirror. While substantially lighter, the light enters and exits the mirrors' glass several times, each time losing brightness and instead scattering. The pentaprism is typically much heavier, but only has one entrance and one exit, providing notably superior optical performance. Additionally, pentamirrors can conceivably go out of alignment while a pentaprism's facets are perfectly aligned until it is destroyed.

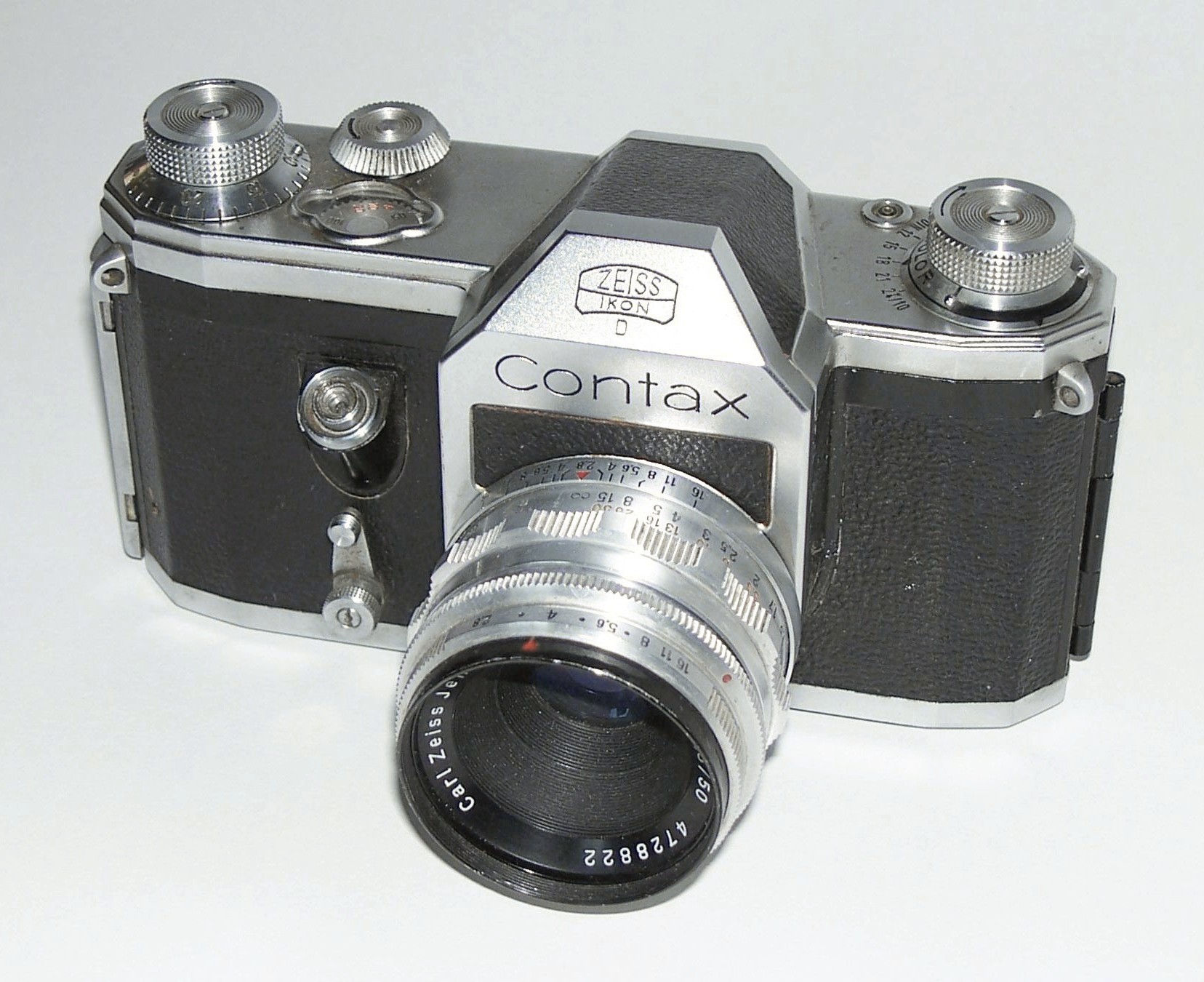
Zeiss Ikon Contax S with the world's first roof pentaprism on a single-lens reflex camera.

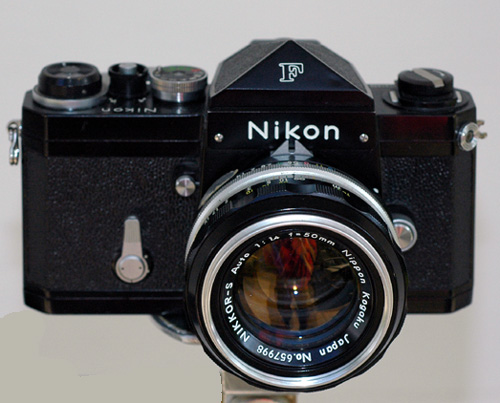
Nikon F with an interchangeable roof pentaprism — the first system camera with a roof pentaprism.

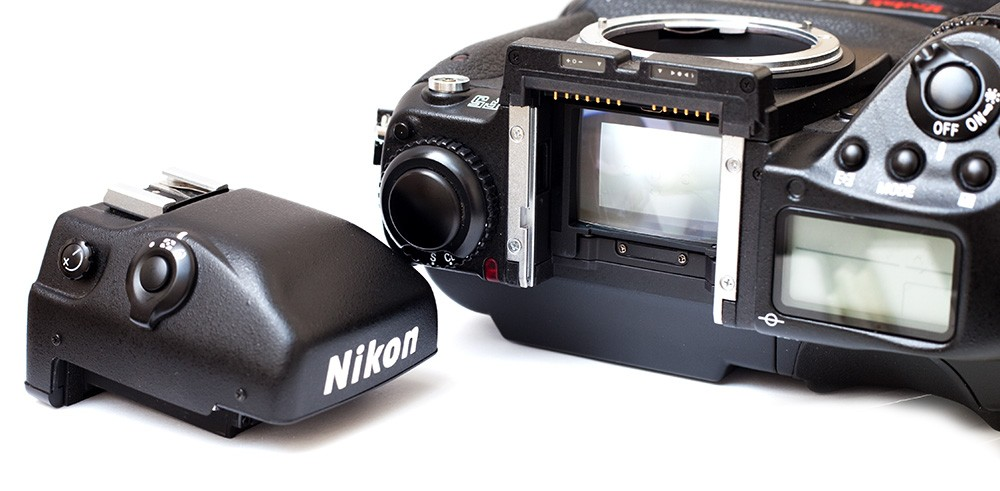
The standard DP-30 prism of a Nikon F5, removed.

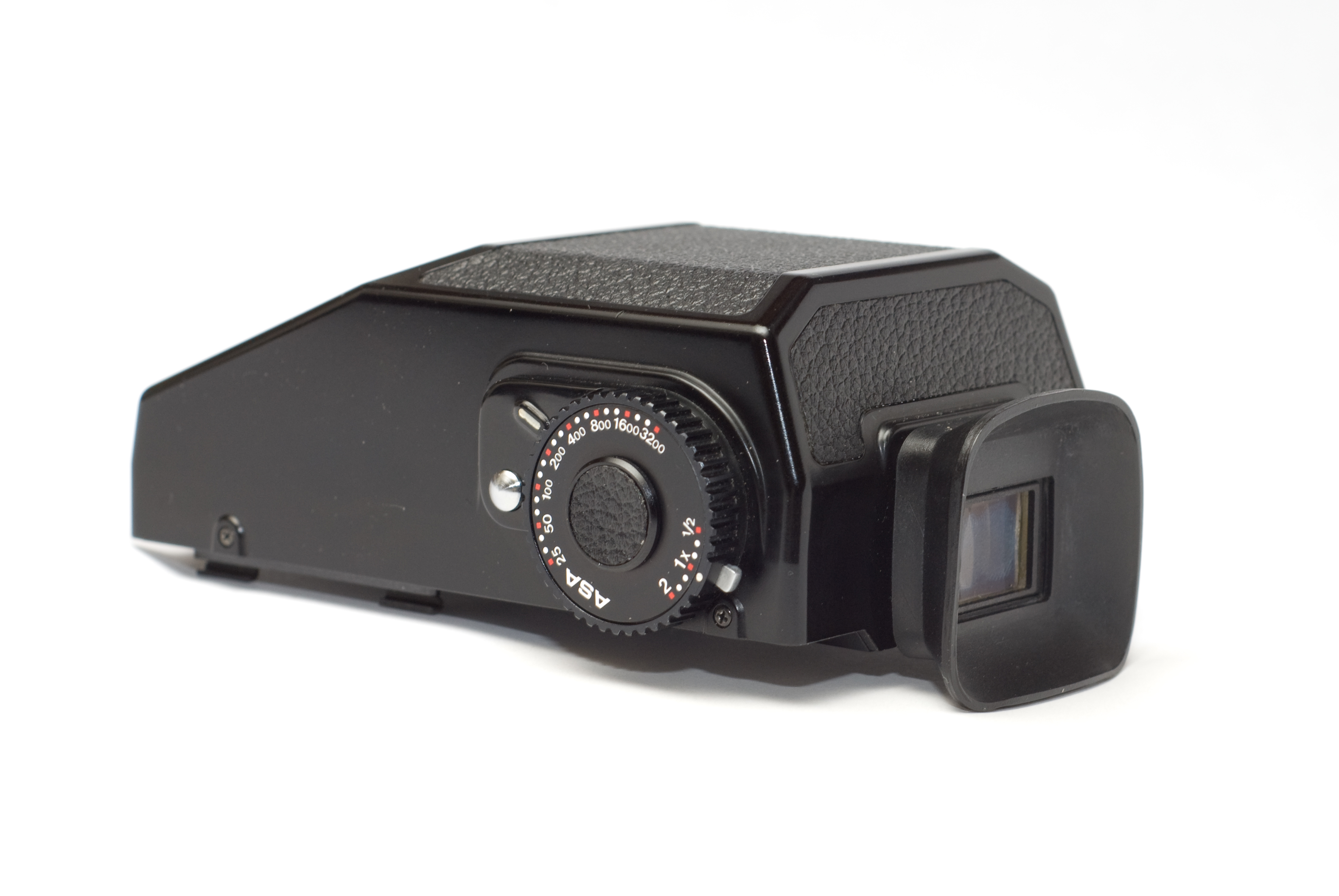
Prism housing for Bronica ETR medium format cameras.

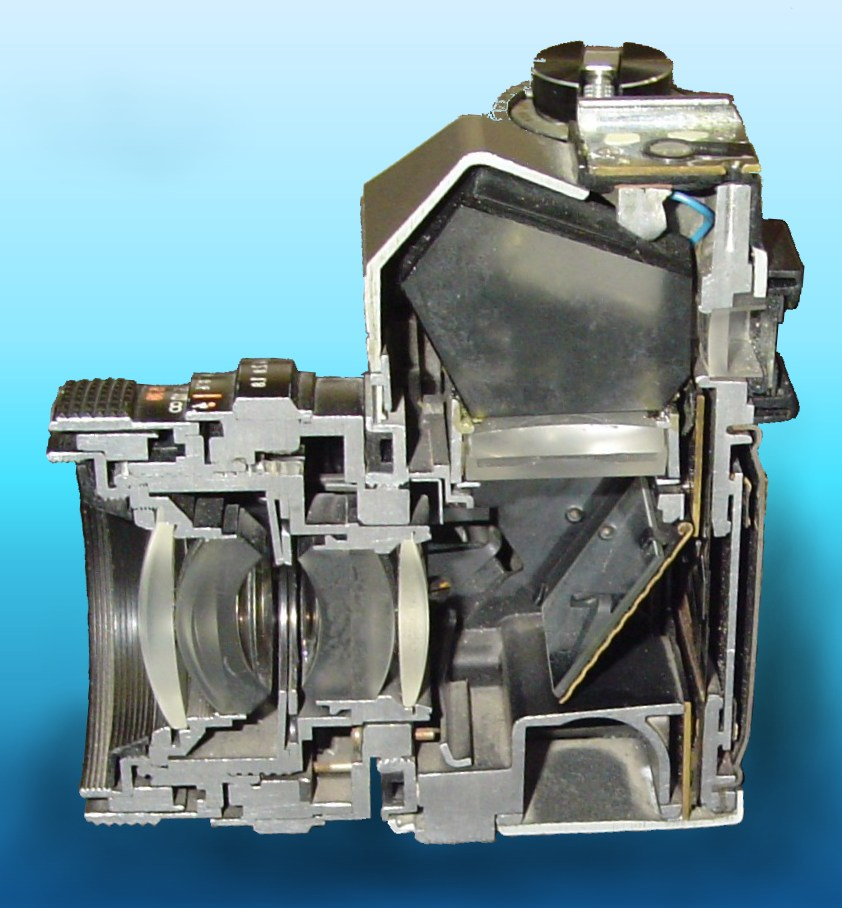
A cutaway view of a Praktica L2 showing the pentaprism.

== In surveying ==
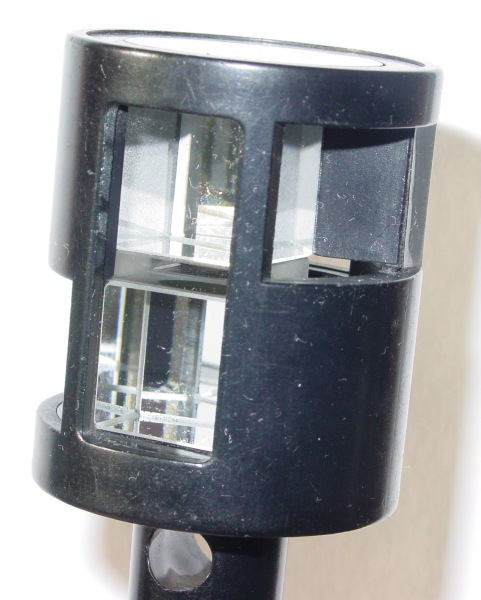
Double pentaprism as used in surveying.

In surveying a double pentaprism (two pentaprisms stacked on top of each other) and a plumb-bob are used to stake out right angles, e.g. on a construction site.

== See also ==
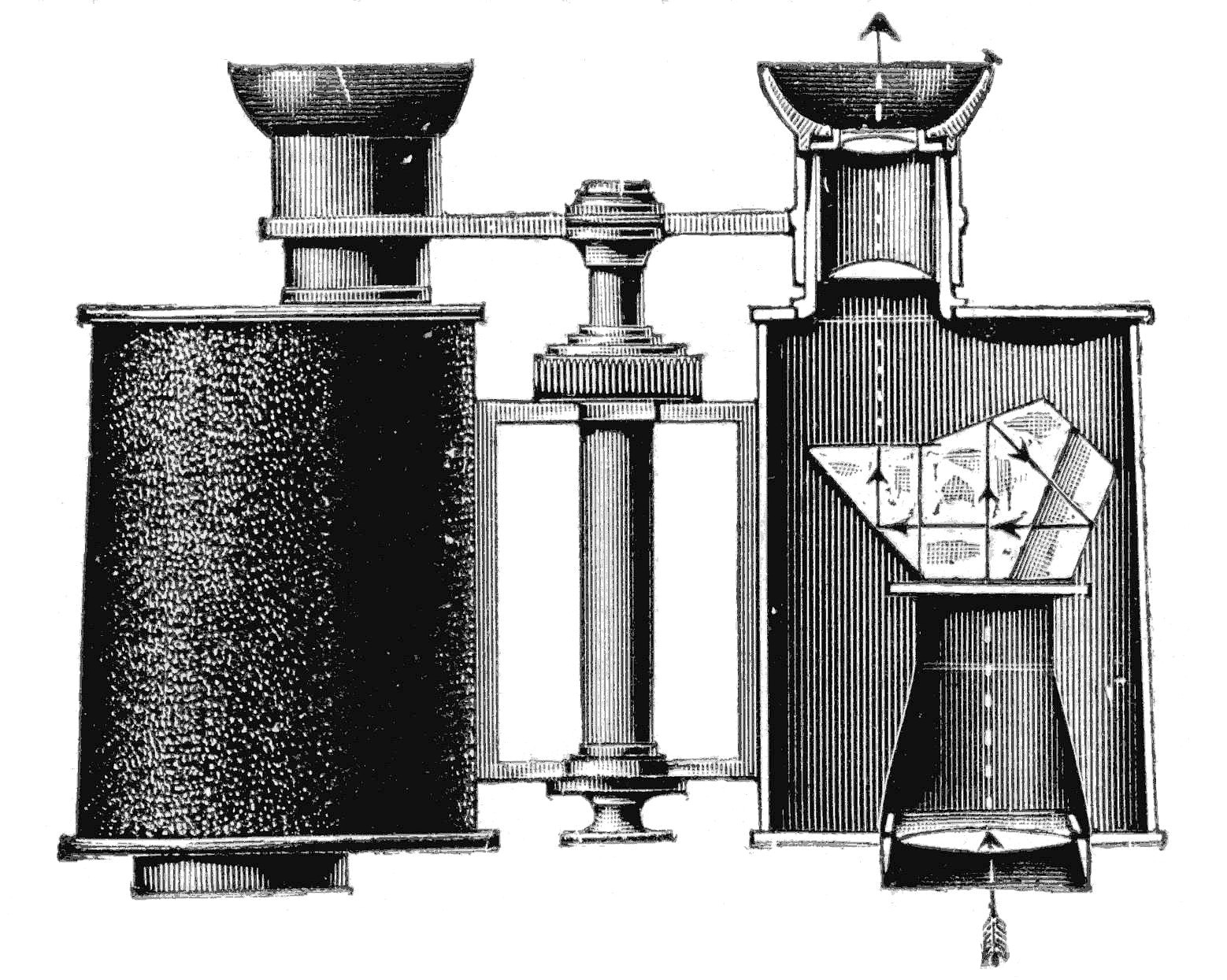
Hensoldt roof pentaprism binoculars

- Digital single-lens reflex camera
- Pentamirror
- Retroreflector
