= Better Light =

American manufacturing company

Better Light, Inc. was an American company that manufactured digital backs for large format film cameras. It was based in San Carlos, California.

The Better Light scan back was a device designed to make it possible to capture digital photographs using traditional 4x5 large format film view cameras, copy stands, and microscopes by replacing the 4x5 film holders that they used.

The Better Light utilized a high-resolution line scanner that scanned the image plane in place of where a sheet of 4x5 film traditionally went. This action was similar to how a desktop scanner works. This scan took time, so could only be used for still objects. This approach was in contrast to sensors used in contemporary digital cameras that capture the entire image at once. The primary benefit of the Better Light system was that it did not need to use a Bayer filter to record color information so avoided the need to interpolate color data. Current Pixelshift technology achieves the same result in Bayer filters, which is the most common type of sensor used in DSLRs today.

The company's president, Mike Colette, worked as an instrumentation engineer before starting the company in 1992.

Better Light ceased production in 2012. Mike Colette died on May 11, 2017, in Placerville, California.
