= Pentamirror =

Optical device used in a viewfinder

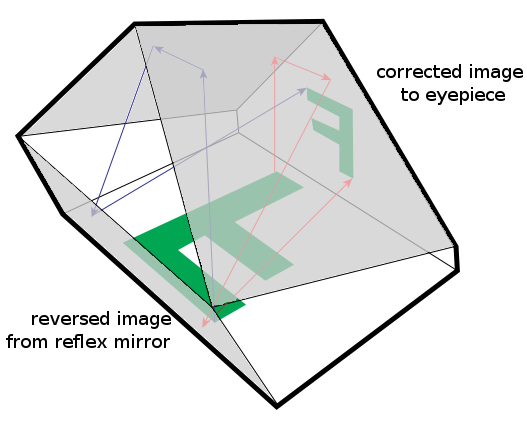
A roof pentamirror contains 3 mirrors.

A pentamirror is an optical device used in the viewfinder systems of various single-lens reflex cameras instead of a pentaprism. It is used to reverse again the laterally reversed image coming from the reflex mirror.

Instead of the solid block of glass of the prism in a pentaprism system, here 3 mirrors are used to perform the same task. This is cheaper and lighter, but generally produces a viewfinder image of lower quality and brightness.

This optical device is often (more precisely) referred to as roof pentamirror because of the roof-like ridge.
