= Canon EOS R =

2018 full-frame mirrorless camera

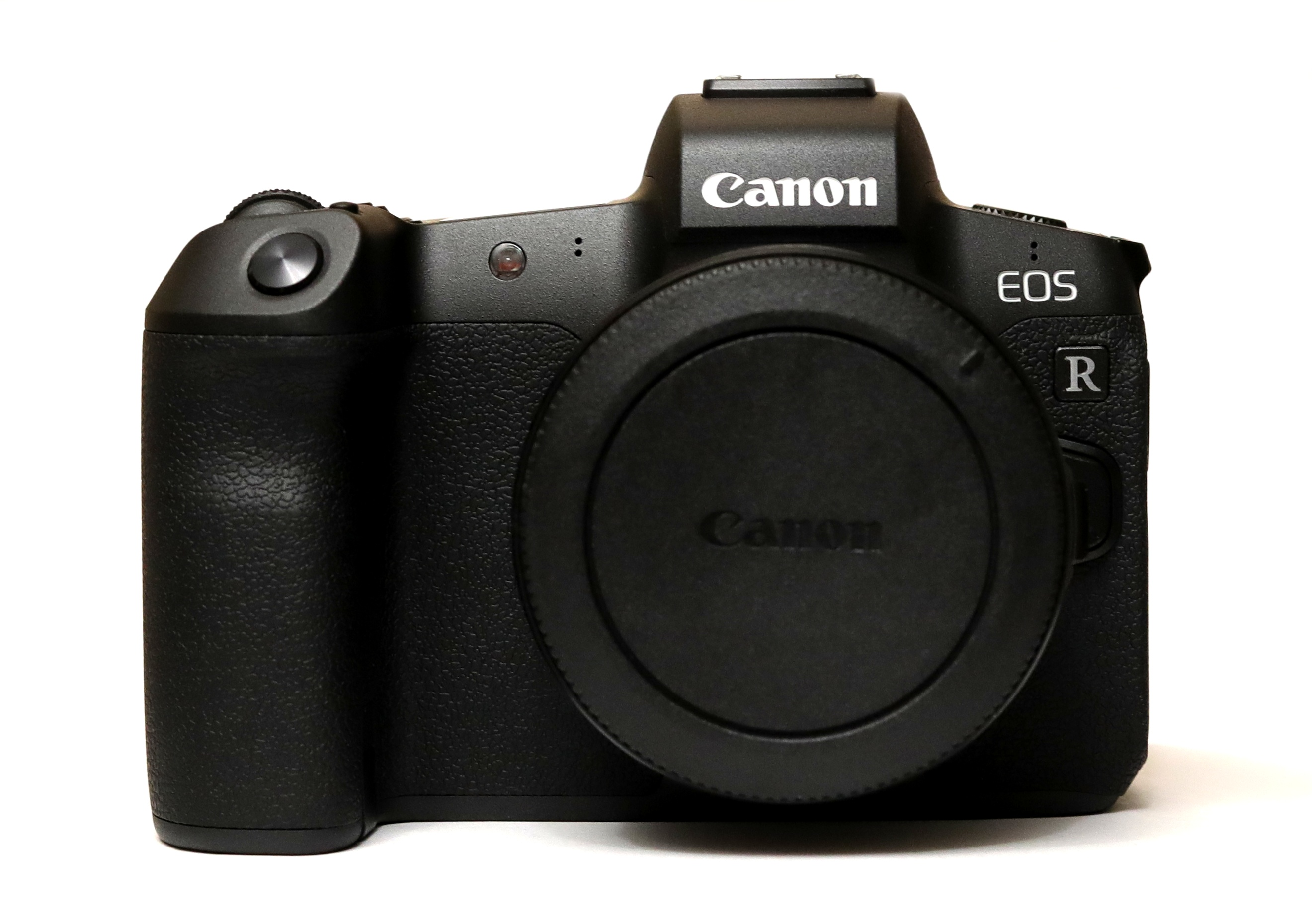
- EOS R camera body with RF body cap

Overview
- Maker: Canon Inc.
- Type: Mirrorless interchangeable lens camera
- Released: 9 October 2018
- Intro price: $2299 (body only)

Lens
- Lens mount: Canon RF

Sensor/medium
- Sensor: dual-pixel CMOS sensor
- Sensor type: Full Frame CMOS
- Sensor size: Full-frame (36 × 24 mm)
- Maximum resolution: 6,720 × 4,480 pixels (30.1 MP)
- Film speed: ISO 100 – 40,000 expandable to 102,400
- Recording medium: SDXC (UHS-II capable)

Focusing
- Focus: Dual Pixel CMOS autofocus

Flash
- Flash exposure compensation: ± 3 stops in 1/3- or 1/2-stop increments

Shutter
- Frame rate: 8 fps
- Shutter speeds: 30 s to 1/8000 s

Viewfinder
- Viewfinder: 3.69-million dot OLED EVF
- Viewfinder magnification: 0.76x
- Frame coverage: 100%

Image processing
- Image processor: DIGIC 8

General
- Video recording: 4K resolution (30 fps)
- LCD screen: 3.2 in 2.1-million-dot LCD
- Battery: LP-E6N, LP-E6, LP-E6NH
- Data port(s): Wi-Fi, Bluetooth
- Dimensions: 135.8 mm × 98.3 mm × 84.4 mm (5.35 in × 3.87 in × 3.32 in)
- Weight: 580 g (20 oz) (body only), 660 g (23 oz) (incl. battery and memory card)
- Made in: Japan
- Replaced by: Canon EOS R6; Canon EOS R6 Mark II

The Canon EOS R is the first full-frame mirrorless interchangeable-lens camera (MILC) produced by Canon. It was announced days after Nikon's first full-frame MILC, the Nikon Z7, and five years after Sony's first, and was released in October 2018. The camera is the first of Canon's new EOS R system, and the first to use the RF lens mount. The "R" stands for "Reimagine optical excellence".

The EOS R features a 30.3 megapixel CMOS sensor, an OLED viewfinder and an articulating LCD touchscreen. Autofocus uses dual-pixel technology, and "Eye Detection AF" automatically focuses on human faces within the scene. The mechanical shutter can capture still images at up to eight frames per second, and cropped-sensor 4K video capture is supported at 30 fps. The EOS R uniquely offers a "Multi-function Bar", a configurable touch-sensitive strip. The EOS R also introduced the "Flexible Priority Exposure" ("Fv") mode. Adapters are available to allow mounting of older lenses which require the EF lens mount. Canon also released an astrophotography variant named EOS Ra, which uses a modified IR cut-off filter to allow more H-alpha light to be captured, and offers stronger digital magnification, but is otherwise identical to the EOS R.

The Canon EOS R was received with mixed reviews, and compared unfavourably to the Nikon Z6 and the Sony α7 III, though there was praise for the EOS R's autofocus and image quality, and for the RF lenses launched with it. The Multi-function Bar was roundly dismissed by critics as a failure. The EOS R was later unofficially discontinued and listed as "no longer in production" on the official Canon site.

== Release ==
The Canon EOS R was announced 5 September 2018 and released 9 October 2018. It was the first of Canon's "EOS R System" of mirrorless interchangeable-lens cameras, and it was the first camera to use Canon's RF lens mount.

Canon announced the EOS R a few days after rival Nikon announced their first full-frame mirrorless interchangeable-lens camera, the Nikon Z7. Rival Sony had been in the full-frame mirrorless interchangeable-lens camera market for nearly five years by this time.

== Name ==
The "R" in EOS R comes from the first letter of "Reimagine optical excellence", Canon's development concept for both the EOS R system as a whole, and also for this EOS R camera which launched the new system.

== Features ==
The EOS R is Canon's first full-frame mirrorless camera. It introduced the new EOS R system and the RF lens mount. Using an EF-EOS R mount adapter, the EOS R can accept all Canon EF and EF-S lenses. The camera uses the DIGIC 8 processor.

=== Sensor ===
The Canon EOS R uses a full-frame (36 × 24 mm) CMOS sensor with 30.3 "effective megapixels". It can produce a still image of up to 6720 × 4480 pixels (giving 30.1 megapixels in the generated image file). ISO sensitivity can be set to values between 100 and 40,000 by default, but the EOS R can be configured to expand the permitted range down to 50 and up to 51,200 or even 102,400. The sensor is able to achieve a dynamic range of 13.5EV at ISO 50. This dynamic range is considered good, but lower than its competitors, such as the Nikon Z7, which can achieve a dynamic range of 14.6EV at ISO 32. The Nikon Z7 was announced several weeks before the EOS R.

=== Displays ===
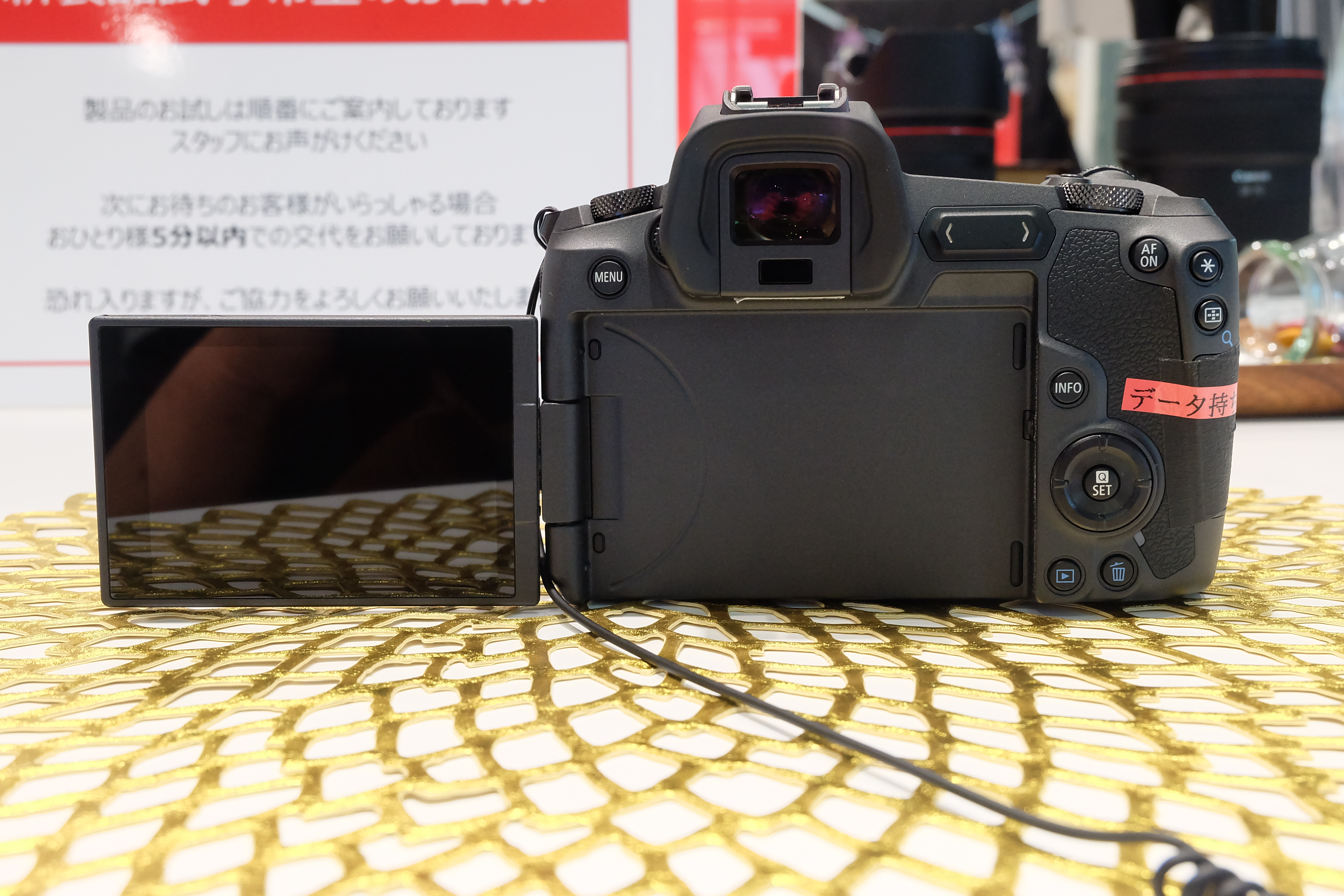
The Vari-Angle Touchscreen LCD can be rotated to help compose shots from different angles.

The EVF uses an OLED screen with 3.69 million dots, offering a 100% view of the sensor image. In addition to the EVF, a 3.15-inch "Vari-Angle" (articulating) LCD touchscreen and a dot-matrix LCD information panel are available. The Canon EOS R does not feature a joystick, but the touchscreen can be used in "Touch and Drag AF" mode to move the autofocus point.

The EOS R includes a two-axis (roll and pitch) electronic level display which can optionally be overlaid into the viewfinder or LCD displays, but is not available when using face or eye detection mode, nor during movie shooting mode.

A live histogram can be used when "exposure simulation" mode is enabled. The histogram can be displayed as an overall brightness graph, or as RGB graphs.

=== Autofocus ===
The camera supports up to 5,655 manually selectable autofocus points, within a focus area which covers approximately 100% of the height and 88% of the width of the image area when shooting still images. This area is reduced to 80% by 80% for some old EF lenses and extender combinations.

Alongside manual focus point selection, the EOS R also offers "Eye Detection AF". This is used to find human faces within a scene and select an eye as the focus point, keeping track of it as the person moves around the frame. If the subject is too far away, "Eye Detection AF" instead focuses on the face as a whole, though firmware release version 1.4 increased the effective distance by a factor of about three.

The autofocus system on the EOS R is able to focus at light levels down to -6 EV when using an f/1.2 lens and the central AF point.

=== Manual focus ===
Canon RF lenses use a focus-by-wire system, which allows the Canon EOS R to be configured to alter the direction and rate of focus change when turning the focusing ring on a Canon RF lens. It also allows a focus distance scale to be shown in the viewfinder while using an RF lens.

To assist with manual focus, the Canon EOS R offers Focus Peaking, which overlays dots on the viewfinder image to show which points of the scene are in sharp focus. The EOS R also offers "Focus Guide", which adds a box overlay to the viewfinder image with indicator lines, which help to zero-in the focus on the selected focus point, turning green when focus is achieved.

=== Video ===
The Canon EOS R is able to capture 4K video at 30 fps, but only by using a cropped portion of the full sensor, making wide-angle views harder to achieve. The competing full-frame mirrorless Nikon Z6 is able to capture 4K video at 30 fps using the full sensor.

=== Shutter ===
The mechanical shutter closes if the Canon EOS R is powered off, which reduces the risk of direct sunlight damaging the sensor when not in use and helps to protect the sensor from dust and debris. Contemporary Sony mirrorless full-frame cameras do not close the shutter when powered off, and this can lead to problems with dirt on the sensor. The EOS R shutter speed can be set to values between 1/8000 s and 30 s. Canon states that the mechanical shutter is rated to approximately 200,000 cycles.

In "High-speed continuous shooting" mode the camera can capture eight frames per second, but this drops to five frames per second when "Servo AF" mode is engaged.

A "Silent Shutter" mode is available, which does not cause the mechanical shutter to operate and thus avoids making any shutter sound. However, this uses an electronic shutter mode which works by reading the sensor one line at a time, and this means that fast movement during the read will cause a rolling shutter effect, leading to an image with skewed elements. Additionally, certain features are not available while using "Silent Shutter" mode, such as anti-flicker correction, HDR mode, and the use of flash, and with some lenses the sounds of adjusting focus and aperture may be audible anyway.

=== Flexible Priority mode ===
The Canon EOS R introduces a new exposure mode called "Flexible Priority Exposure Mode" or "Fv Mode". Fv mode allows the values for aperture, shutter speed, ISO sensitivity, and exposure compensation to each be set to "AUTO" or to a specific value, and it remembers the chosen values until they are deliberately reset by pressing the right arrow on the rear four-way controller. This flexibility makes Fv mode useful for saving into custom shooting modes, though a downside is that Fv mode will ignore any minimum shutter speed configured via the system menu even if shutter speed is set to AUTO.

=== Multi-function Bar ===
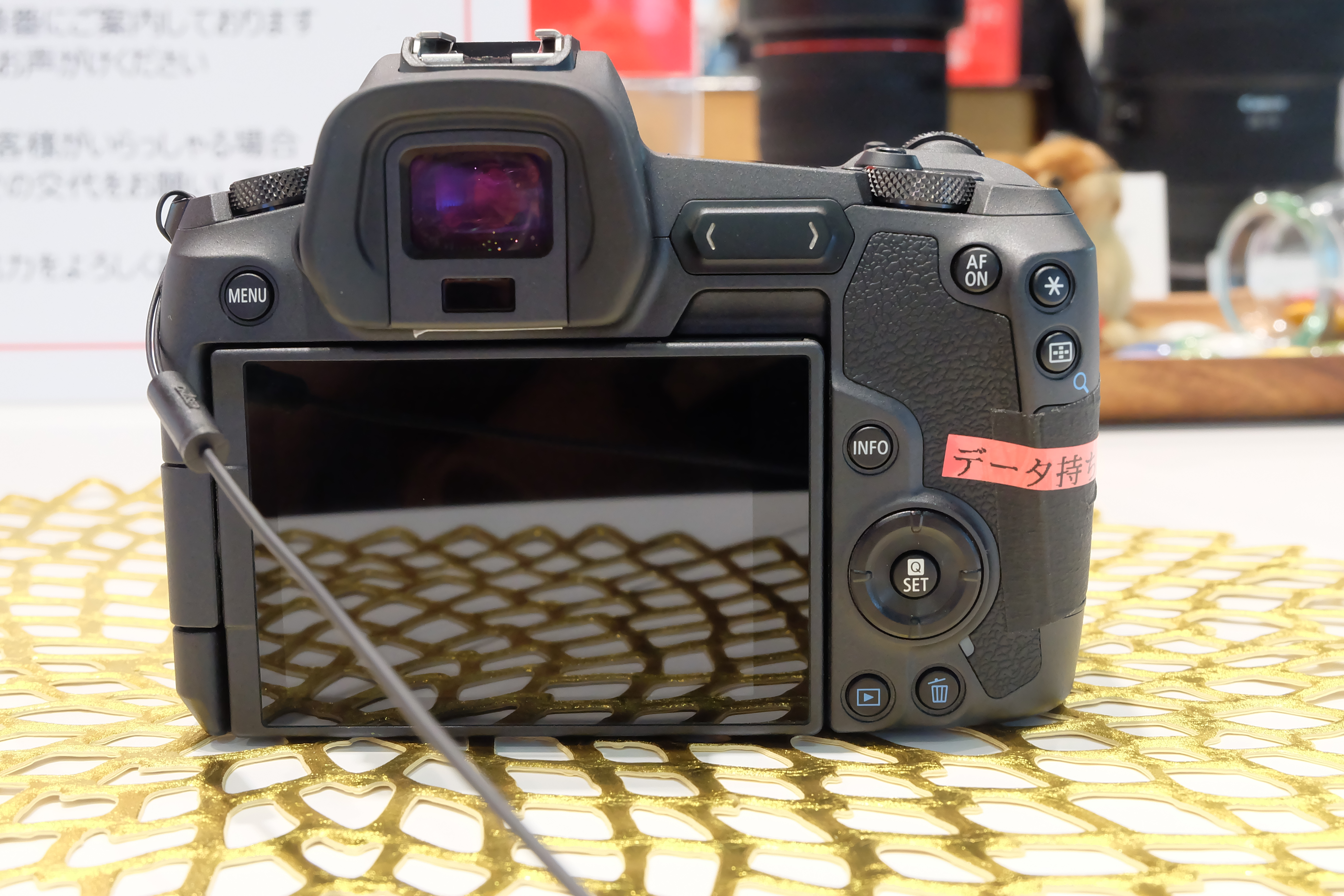
The Multi-function Bar is to the right of the viewfinder, marked with left/right chevrons.

The EOS R features a touch-sensitive strip called the "Multi-function Bar", intended to sit under the right thumb. The Multi-function Bar recognises swipe, tap-left, and tap-right actions, and each action can be configured to adjust a camera setting such as ISO sensitivity, view magnifier, autofocus method, MF peaking, white balance, and show/hide histogram or electronic level. Because the position of the Multi-function Bar makes it prone to accidental contact, a safety lock exists so that you must hold your finger on the bar for about a second to unlock it, though this lock can be disabled in the system menu.

== Variants ==
On 5 November 2019 Canon announced the EOS Ra, which is physically identical to the EOS R but has a modified IR cut-off filter which allows four times more H-alpha (Hα) light to be captured, making it a camera specialised for astrophotography. The EOS Ra also allows up to 30× digital magnification (while the EOS R stops at 10×) and the added magnification makes it easier to check that dim stars are in sharp focus. Production of the EOS Ra was reportedly discontinued in late 2021, but the model will be eligible for repair by Canon until January 2028.

== Accessories ==
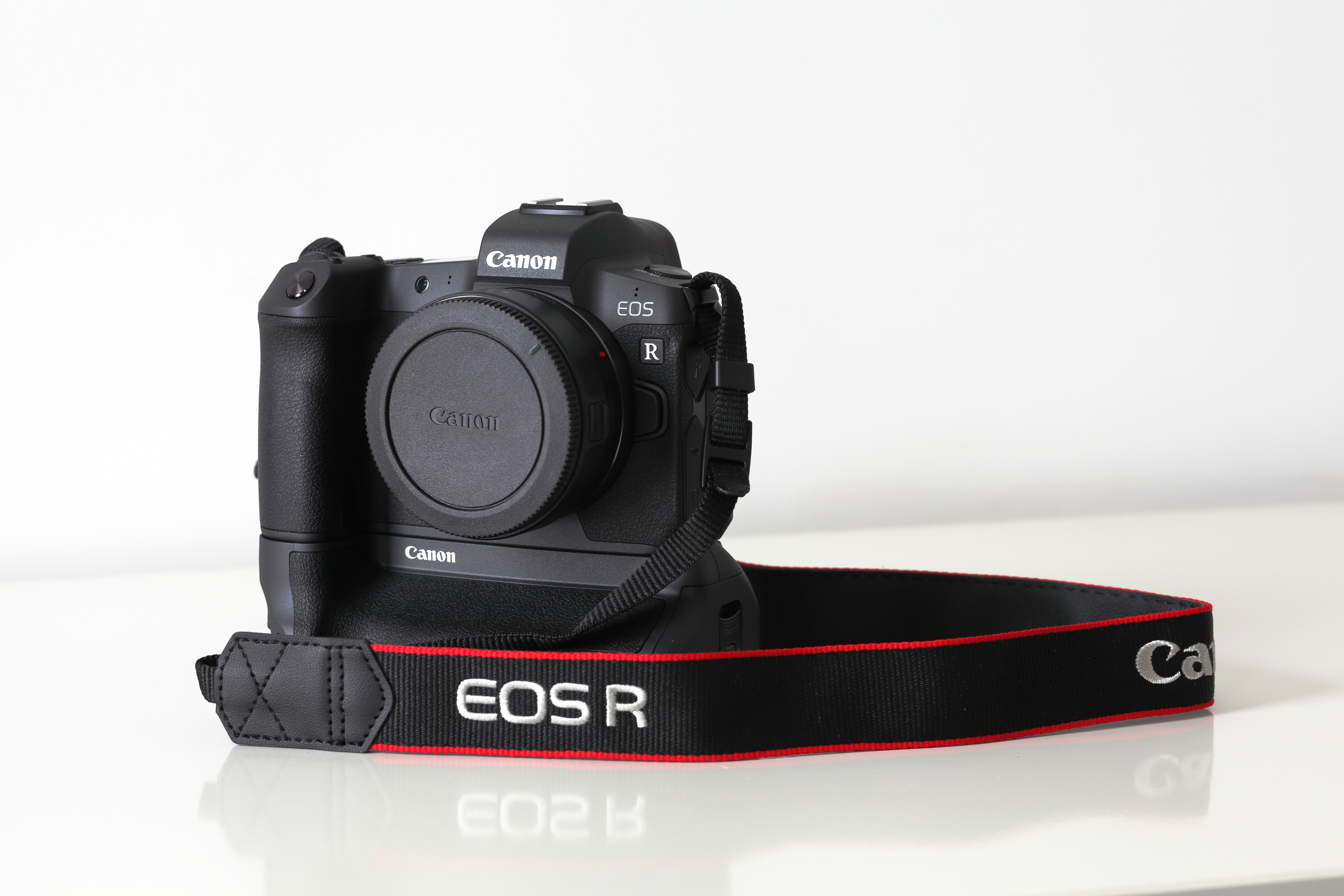
Canon EOS R with Battery Grip BG-E22 and Mount Adapter EF-EOS R

The launch of the Canon EOS R introduced the Mount Adapters which allow EF and EF-S lenses to be used on an RF lens mount. The EOS R is also compatible with Canon Speedlite flash heads, the GP-E2 GPS Receiver, and the Directional Stereo Microphone DM-E1.

For triggering the shutter without touching the camera body, the EOS R is compatible with the Remote Switch RS-60E3, and the Wireless Remote Control BR-E1. The Timer Remote Controller TC-80N3 is also supported if a Remote Controller Adapter RA-E3 is used.

The Canon EOS R comes with an LP-E6N battery, and is compatible with the LP-E6 battery, or the LP-E6NH battery. The LP-E6N battery can be charged in-camera using the optional USB Power Adapter PD-E1, but the other battery types cannot. Alternatively, the included Battery Charger LC-E6 (or LC-E6E) can be used to charge all three battery types outside of the camera body.

The optional Battery Grip BG-E22 adds a second grip and controls for vertical/portrait-aspect shooting, and doubles the battery pack capacity. The BG-E22 supports the use of the USB Power Adapter PD-E1 for charging one or two LP-E6N batteries while they are in the grip, so long as no LP-E6 battery is inside. The BG-E22 also allows the camera to be powered directly from a household power outlet in combination with the optional DC Coupler DR-E6 and AC Adapter AC-E6 or with AC Adapter Kit ACK-E6.

== Lenses ==
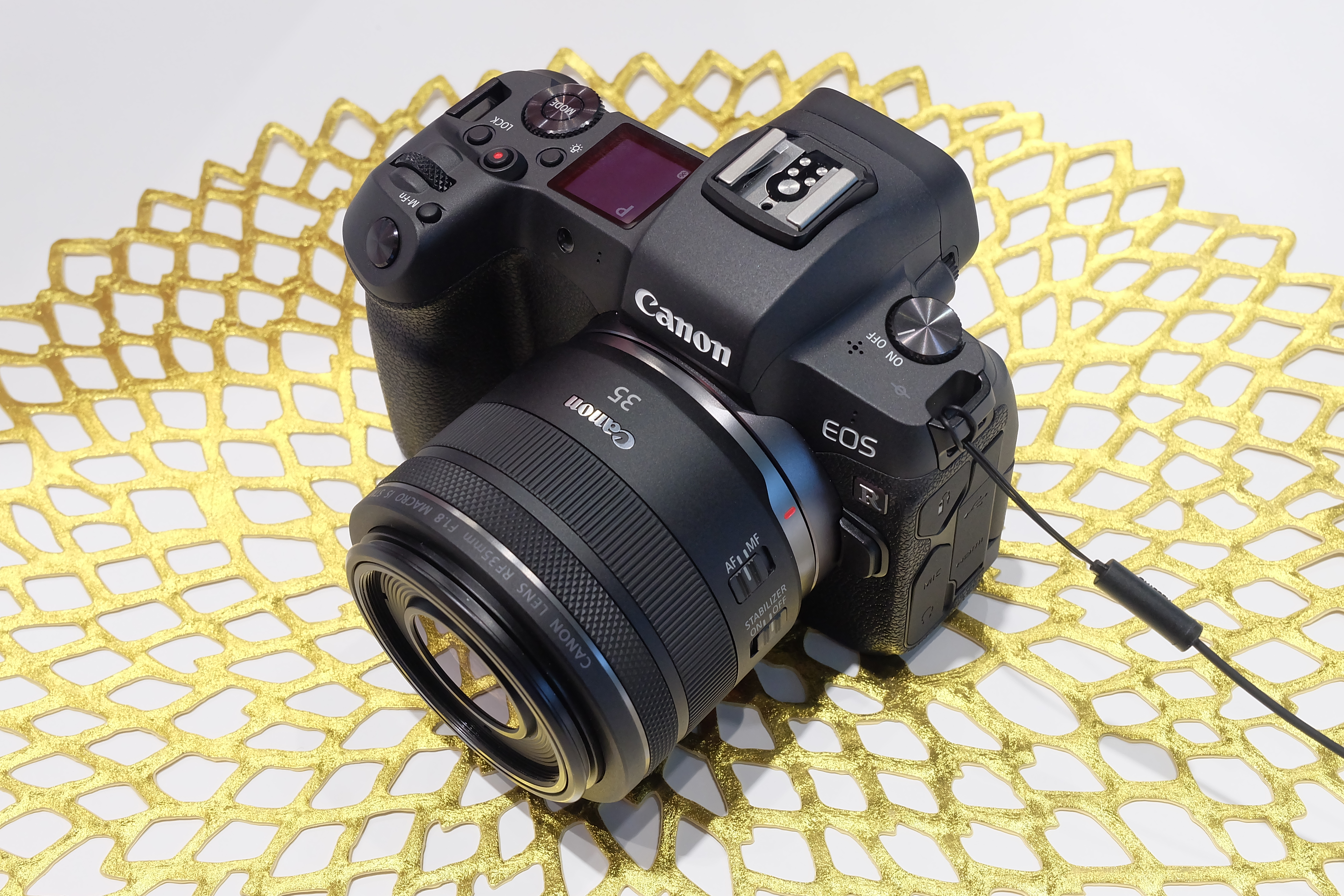
The Canon RF 35mm F1.8 Macro IS STM lens mounted on an EOS R

The Canon EOS R camera uses the Canon RF lens mount. The following lens models were available at the release date:

- Canon RF 35mm F1.8 Macro IS STM
- Canon RF 50mm F1.2 L USM
- Canon RF 24-105mm F4 L IS USM
- Canon RF 28-70mm F2 L USM

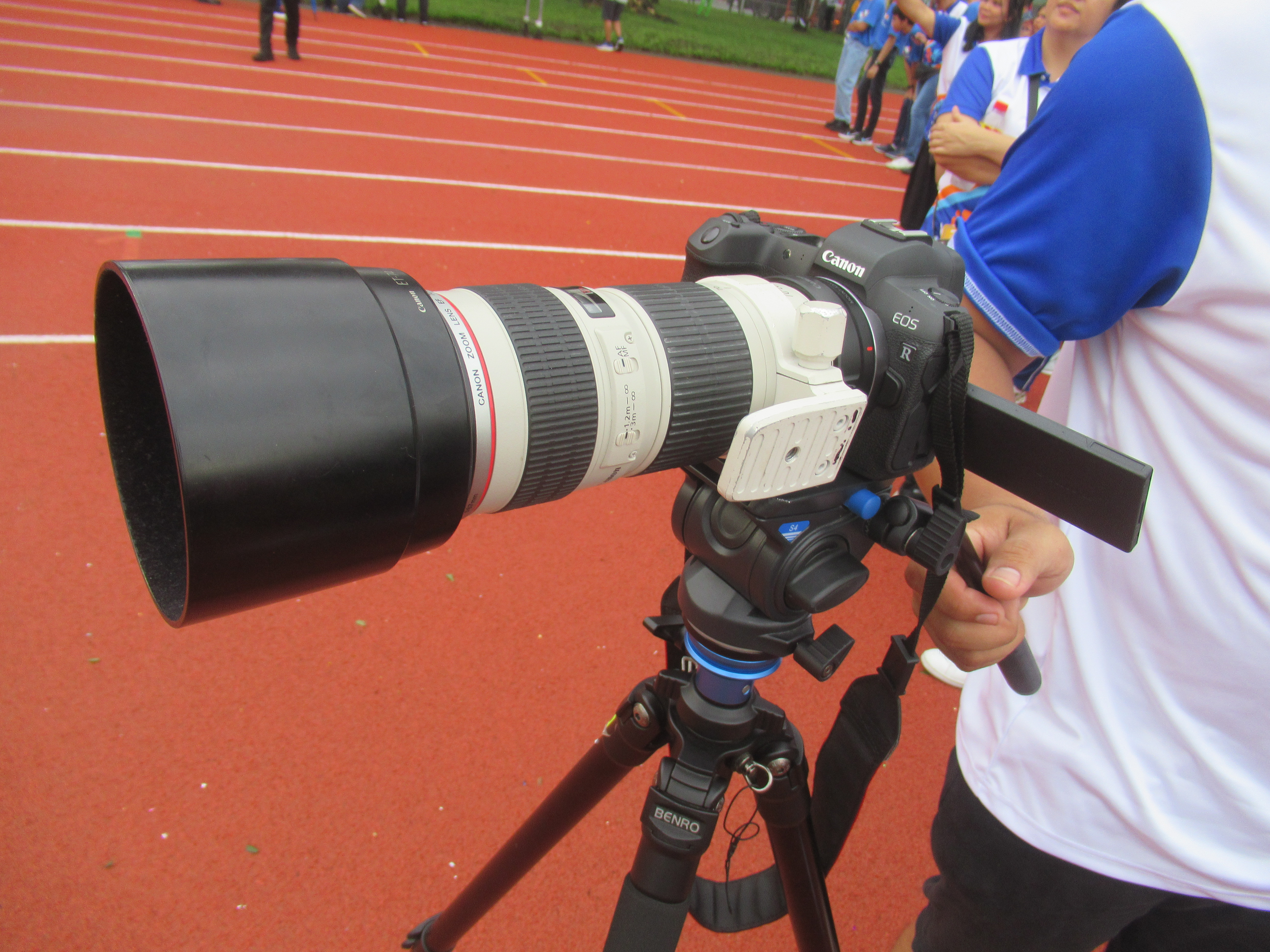
A Canon EF lens mounted to the EOS R via a Mount Adapter EF-EOS R

It is also possible to use older EF and EF-S lenses with one of the three available EF-EOS R mount adapters. Mount Adapter EF-EOS R is the simplest adapter, connecting EF and EF-S lenses to the EOS R body. The Control Ring Mount Adapter EF-EOS R adds a control ring like those found on RF lenses, providing customizable control (such as ISO, aperture, etc.) with existing EF and EF-S lenses, and the Drop-In Filter Mount Adapter EF-EOS R includes drop-in filter capability for use with circular polarizing filters or variable ND filters.

When using an RF or EF lens, the EOS R supports full frame mode and several cropping and aspect ratio modes: 1.6x (crop), 1:1 (aspect ratio), 4:3 (aspect ratio), and 16:9 (aspect ratio). When an EF-S lens is used, the camera automatically selects 1.6x crop mode, and neither full frame nor any of the other modes is available.

== Reception ==
After the announcement of the Canon EOS R, the absence of certain features led to a lot of criticism, often heated, in online forums, YouTube videos, and blogs. Particular criticism was levelled at Canon for the absence of anticipated features such as dual memory card slots, full-frame 4K video, and the lack of in-body image stabilization ("IBIS").

When it came to hands-on product tests, Digital Photography Review awarded the Canon EOS R a score of 80% and compared it unfavourably to then-contemporary mirrorless cameras like the Nikon Z6 and the Sony α7 III, both of which were awarded a score of 89%. Digital Photography Review called the new Canon RF lenses "simply spectacular" and praised the image quality and autofocus accuracy of the Canon EOS R, but felt that competing mirrorless cameras offered better video, wider dynamic range, and faster burst rates.

The Canon EOS R earned a Silver Award from Photography Life and a score of 4.1 out of 5. Photography Life felt that the Canon EOS R lagged behind most competitors, again comparing the EOS R unfavourably to the Nikon Z6 (which earned a Gold Award with 4.8 out of 5) and the Sony α7 III (which earned a Gold Award with 4.6 out of 5), but praised the EOS R's autofocus speed and image detail, and its touchscreen, grip, and durable feel.

The Canon EOS R failed to earn a "Camera Labs Recommended" award, scoring only 3.5 out of 5. Camera Labs said that the EOS R produces good-looking photos and praised its viewfinder and articulated screen, but argued that in most areas the EOS R is beaten by the Sony α7 III, which scored 4.5 out of 5 and earned the "Camera Labs Highly Recommended" award.

DxOMark evaluated the sensor in the Canon EOS R and awarded it a score of 89, noting that its score puts it just a little behind the Nikon Z6 score of 95, and the Sony α7 III score of 96, though they also noted that the Dual Pixel architecture of the Canon sensor is likely to limit its performance.

With the initial release of the EOS R, the accuracy of its face/eye tracking autofocus mode was criticised as being weak when compared to the Sony mirrorless cameras. Canon addressed this with firmware release 1.4.0, which included improvements to eye detection autofocus. With the 1.4.0 firmware, the face/eye autofocus was considered to have greatly improved, almost closing the gap with the Sony cameras.

The innovative Multi-function Bar was largely dismissed by critics, described as "superfluous", "mystifying", "impractical in use", and a "fail". Canon did not include the Multi-function Bar on its newer RF mount designs, such as the EOS RP, the EOS R5, or the EOS R6.

The Canon EOS R on display at Canon Gallery S in Tokyo

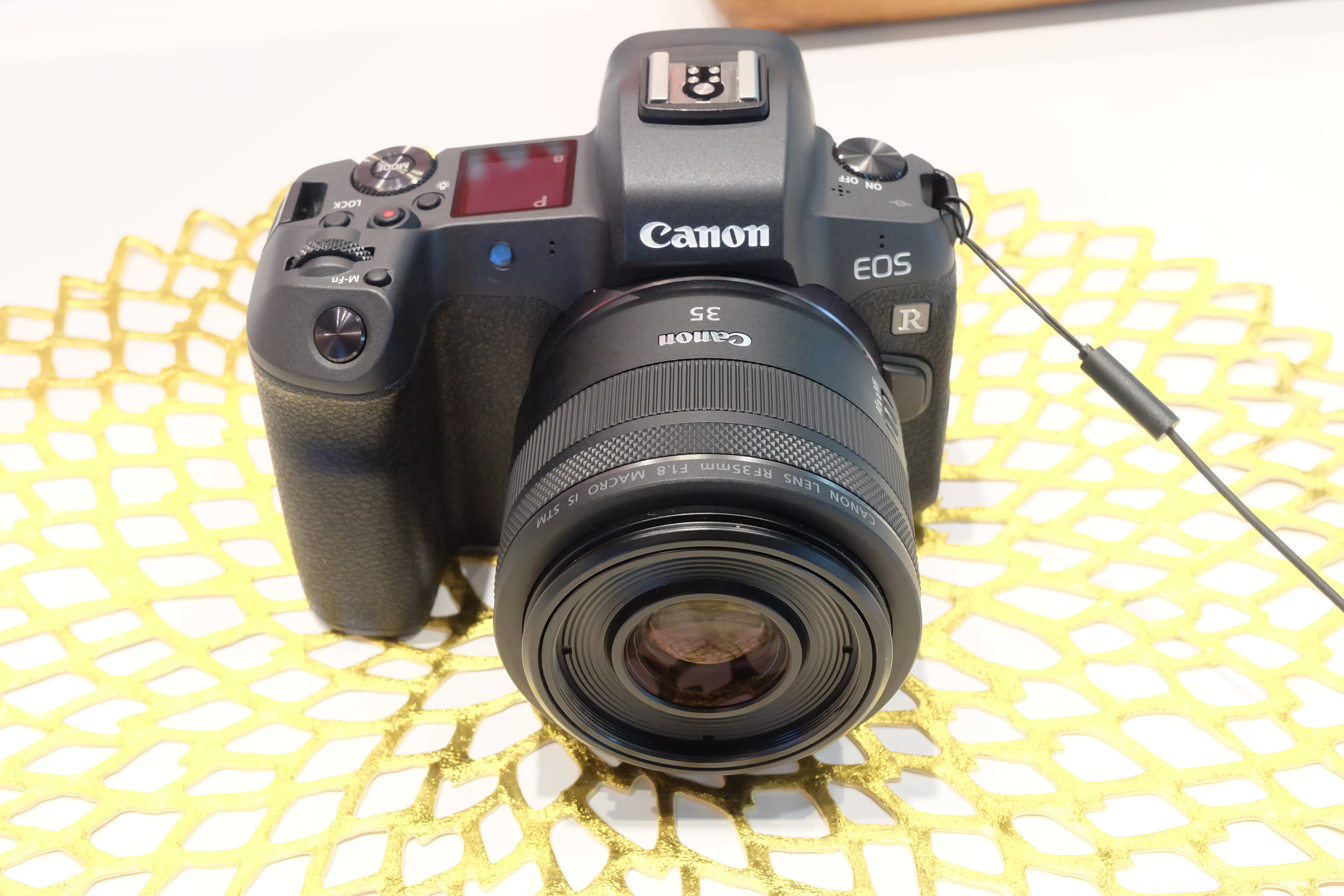

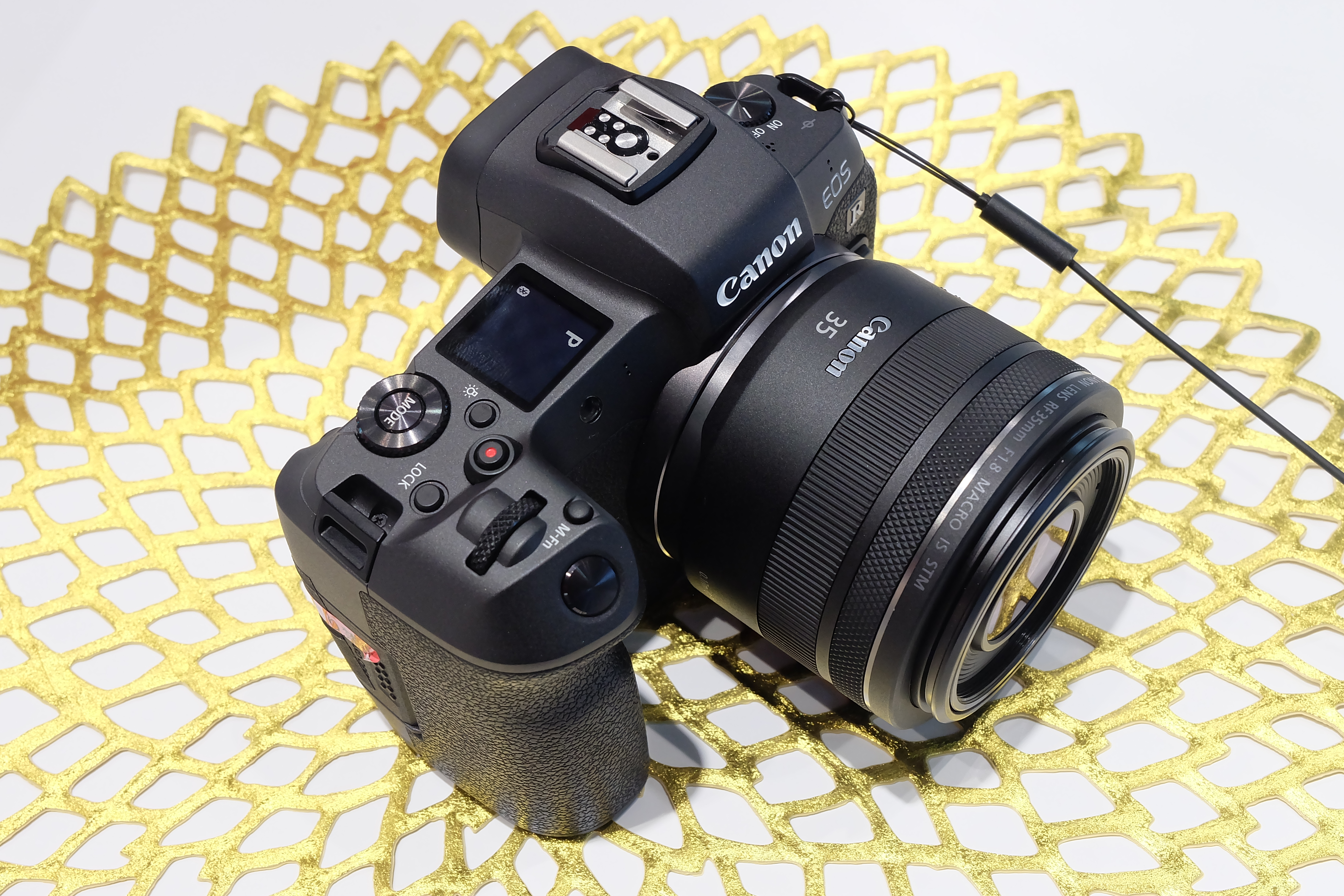

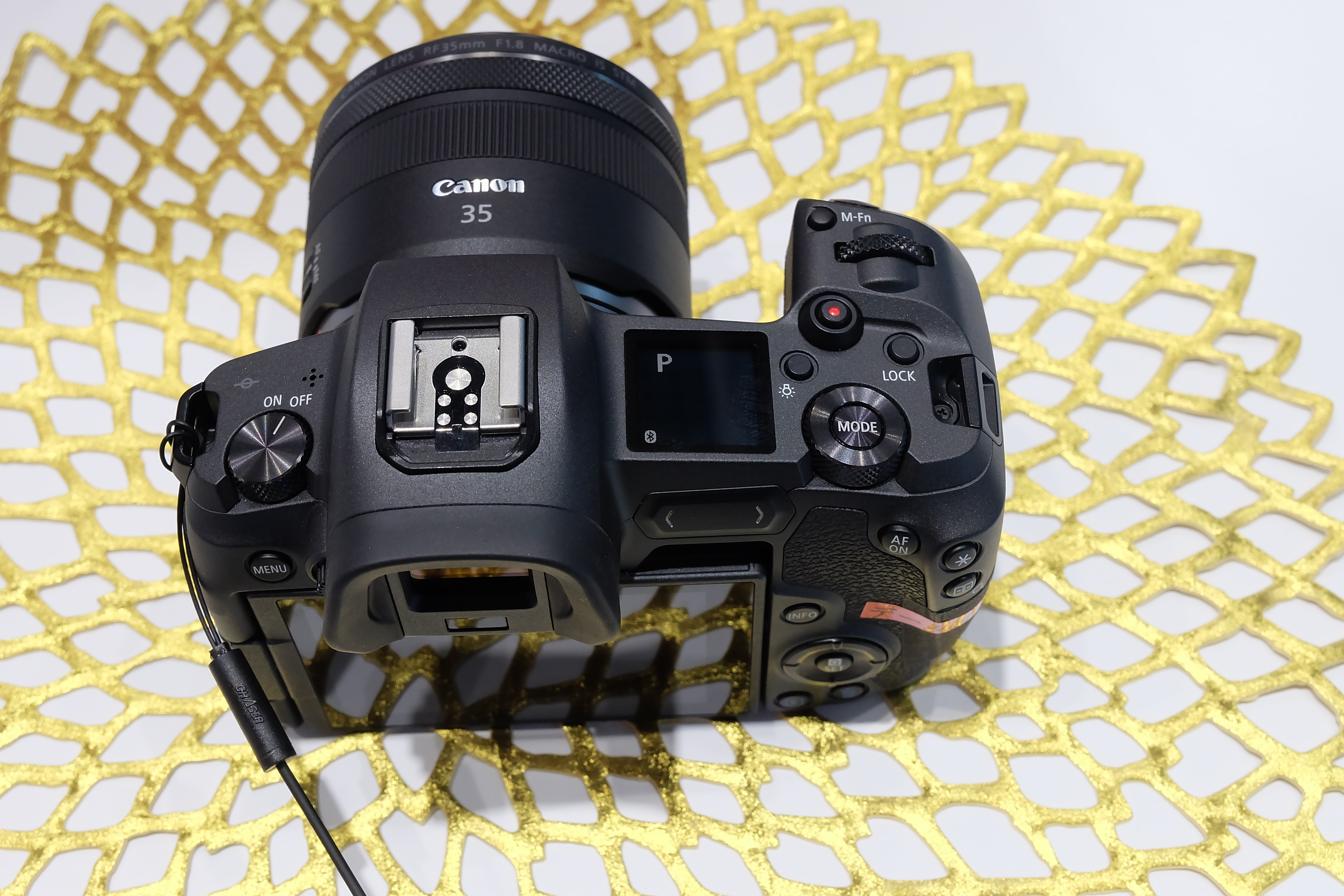

== Discontinuation ==
Production of the EOS R was reportedly discontinued in June 2023. Many of Canon's websites have moved the EOS R into the "discontinued" category. The original EOS R model is no longer listed on the "EOS R System" page of Canon's USA website, and the EOS R now appears on Canon's "EOS products that are no longer in production" page. Despite being discontinued, the EOS R will be eligible for repair by Canon until November 2029.

Some consider the EOS R8 to be the successor to the EOS R, though others claim that this is not the case (and that in fact the EOS R8 is a replacement for the EOS RP, not the EOS R).

== See also ==
- Canon EOS RP
- Canon EOS R5
- Canon EOS R6
- Canon EOS R3
- Canon EOS R8
- Canon EOS M

Sensor	Class	12	13	14	15	16	17	18	19	20	21	22	23	24	25	26
Full-frame	Flagship														_{m} R1 ^{ATS}	
Full-frame	Professional											_{m} R3 ^{ATS}				
Full-frame	Professional										R5 ^{ATSR}				_{m} R5 Mk II ^{ATSR}	
Full-frame	Professional											_{m} R5 C ^{ATCR}				
Full-frame	Advanced										R6 ^{ATS}		_{m} R6 Mk II ^{ATS}			_{m} R6 Mk III ^{ATS}
Full-frame	Advanced															R6 V ^{ATS}
Full-frame	Advanced									Ra ^{AT}						
Full-frame	Advanced								R ^{AT}							
Full-frame	Midrange													_{m} R8 ^{AT}		
Full-frame	Entry/mid								RP ^{AT}							
APS-C	Advanced												_{m} R7 ^{ATS}			
APS-C	Midrange						M5 ^{FT}						_{m} R10 ^{AT}			
APS-C	Entry/mid		_{x} M ^{T}	M2 ^{T}	M3 ^{FT}			M6 ^{FT}		M6 Mk II ^{FT}						
APS-C	Entry/mid								M50 ^{AT}		M50 Mk II ^{AT}			_{m} R50 ^{AT}		
APS-C	Entry/mid															_{m} R50 V ^{AT}
APS-C	Entry					M10 ^{FT}		M100 ^{FT}		M200 ^{FT}				R100		
Sensor	Class															
Sensor	Class	12	13	14	15	16	17	18	19	20	21	22	23	24	25	26
