= Canon EOS R5 =

2020 full-frame mirrorless camera

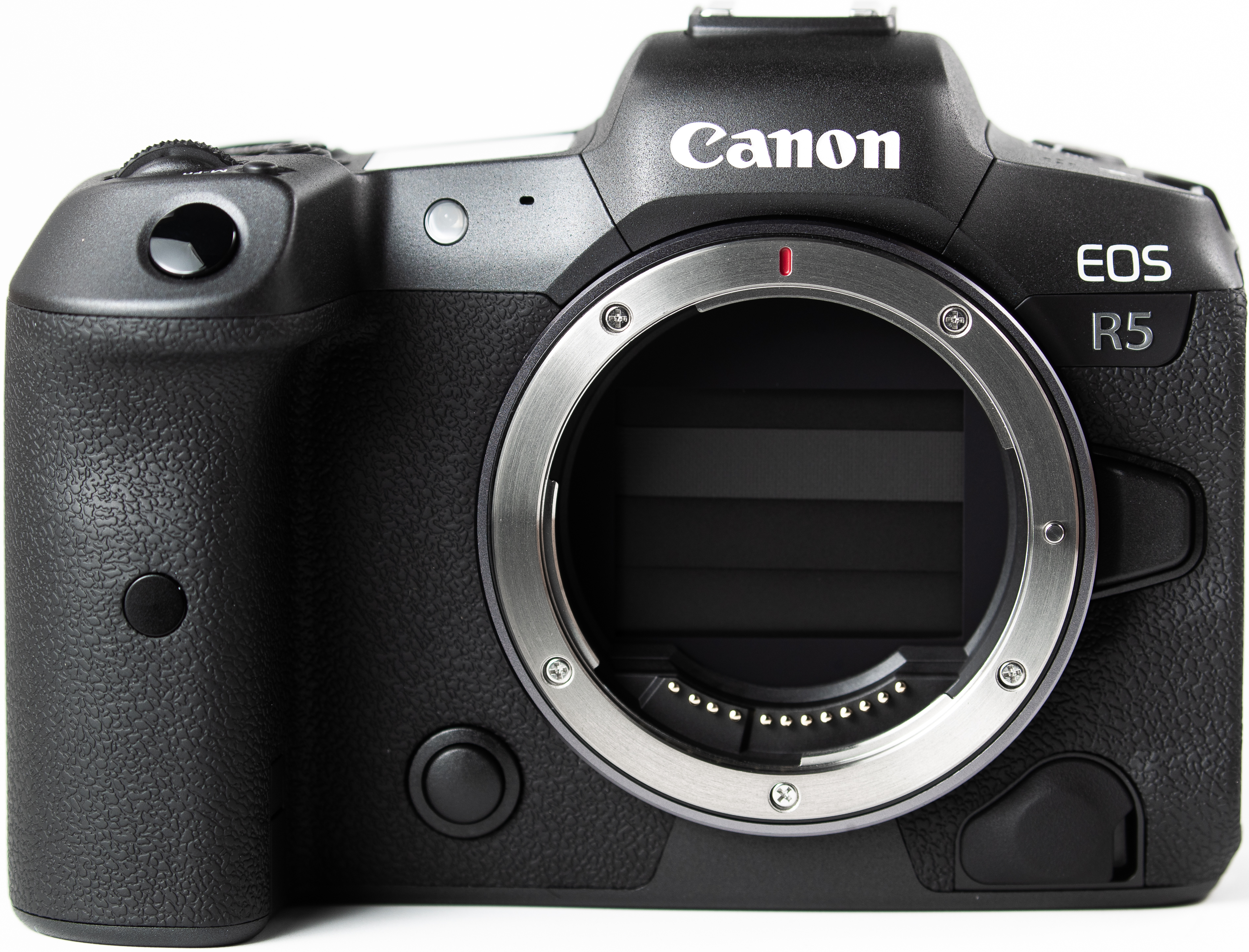
- Canon EOS R5

Overview
- Maker: Canon Inc.
- Type: Full-frame mirrorless interchangeable lens camera
- Released: Announced July 9, 2020
- Intro price: R5: $3,899 (body only) $4,999 (with RF 24-105 F/4 L IS USM) R5 C: $4,499 (body only)

Lens
- Lens mount: Canon RF
- Lens: Interchangeable

Sensor/medium
- Sensor: Dual-pixel CMOS sensor
- Sensor size: Full-frame (36 x 24 mm)
- Maximum resolution: 8192 × 5464 (44.8 MP)
- Film speed: ISO 100 – 51,200 expandable to 50 – 102,400
- Recording medium: Dual slots: CFexpress and SDXC (UHS-II)

Focusing
- Focus: Dual-pixel CMOS AF II

Shutter
- Shutter speeds: 30s - 1/8000s
- Continuous shooting: 12 fps mechanical 20 fps silent

Viewfinder
- Viewfinder: 5.76 million dot OLED EVF
- Viewfinder magnification: 0.76
- Frame coverage: 100%

Image processing
- Image processor: DIGIC X

General
- Video recording: 8K RAW 29.97 fps 8K RAW 59.94 fps (EOS R5 C); 4K 119.9 fps
- LCD screen: 3.2” 2.1m dot
- Battery: LP-E6NH, LP-E6N, LP-E6; 320 shots (EVF); 490 shots (LCD)
- Optional battery packs: R5: BG-R10 & BG-R20 grip allows the use of one LP-E6/N/H battery or two LP-E6/N/H batteries R5 C: BG-R10 grip allows the use of one LP-E6/N/H battery or two LP-E6/N/H batteries
- Dimensions: 138 mm × 97.5 mm × 88 mm (5.43 in × 3.84 in × 3.46 in)
- Weight: 650 g (23 oz) (body only), 738 g (26.0 oz) (incl. battery and memory card)
- Latest firmware: 2.2.1 released 11.20.25
- Made in: Japan

Chronology
- Predecessor: Canon EOS 5D Mark IV (DSLR)
- Successor: Canon EOS R5 Mark II

References
- https://www.usa.canon.com/support/p/eos-r5

The Canon EOS R5 is a professional full-frame mirrorless interchangeable-lens camera officially announced by Canon on July 9, 2020 alongside the lower-resolution EOS R6 and various new RF mount lenses. While it is not a direct successor to any of Canon's previous mirrorless cameras, it does have clear improvements and advantages over the EOS R, namely: a new DIGIC X processor and sensor, 8K video capture, a new autofocus system, and the ability to take videos with 10-bit colours. The camera is available as body only, or with the Canon RF 24-105mm f/4L IS USM lens.

On July 17, 2024 Canon announced a Mark II version, with a new BSI sensor and increased frame rate, among other improvements.

== Features ==
- 44.8-megapixel full-frame CMOS sensor
- 8K raw video recording at up to 29.97 fps
- 4K 10-bit video recording at up to 119.9 fps
- 100% autofocus coverage
- 5,940 user-selectable autofocus points
- Native ISO range of 100 to 51,200; expandable 50 to 102,400
- High-speed continuous shooting of up to 12 fps with mechanical shutter; up to 20 fps with the electronic (silent) shutter
- Color depth of 10-bit for HDR videos
- 5-axis in-body image stabilization which can provide up to 8 stops of shake correction
- Dual card slots (CFexpress and UHS-II SD memory cards)
- 0.5" 5.76 million dots OLED electronic viewfinder with 120 fps refresh rate and vari-angle LCD touchscreen
- Canon's Dual Pixel CMOS AF II with Zero Crop & 100% AF Coverage
- 2.4 GHz and 5 GHz built-in Wi-Fi and Bluetooth connectivity
- Optional wireless file transmitter and battery grip

== Reception ==
=== Overheating issues ===
Shortly after the EOS R5's initial announcement, concerns arose about issues of overheating while recording video, especially 8K video, after short periods of time. In response to users' complaints, Canon issued a media alert addressing these overheating issues, including how long it will take for the camera to overheat at each resolution, why a fan was not included, and how users can prevent the camera from overheating.

According to Canon's reported data, the EOS R5 will begin to overheat after recording for 20 minutes at 8K resolution though the average run time of videos published on social media is 11.7 minutes. A fan was not included to preserve its compact size. Users can delay overheating by toggling on "Overheat Control" in settings, which will adjust resolution and frame rate automatically to prevent overheating. Although Canon offered this explanation, users have continued to complain.

Other testers, however, discovered continuous shooting is possible for up to four hours in 4KHQ mode with an external recorder if no memory cards are inserted, the screen is off, and a dummy battery is used. With an actual battery, again overheating can be avoided for the life of the charge of the battery, about one hour and 45 minutes.

== Canon EOS R5 C ==
Canon addressed overheating issues with a modified follow-up model, the Canon EOS R5 C, announced in January 2022 with an intro MSRP of US$4,499 (body only). Intended as a hybrid between the R5 and the EOS C video-oriented line of cameras, the R5 C includes a cooling fan. This allows the camera to shoot video at any resolution indefinitely, at the cost of a higher weight (770 g) and a larger size (142 x 101 x 111 mm). The R5 C also omits in-body image stabilization. It can record in a larger variety of video modes than the base model, and it supports some additional video-oriented features such as false color and timecode integration.

== Images ==
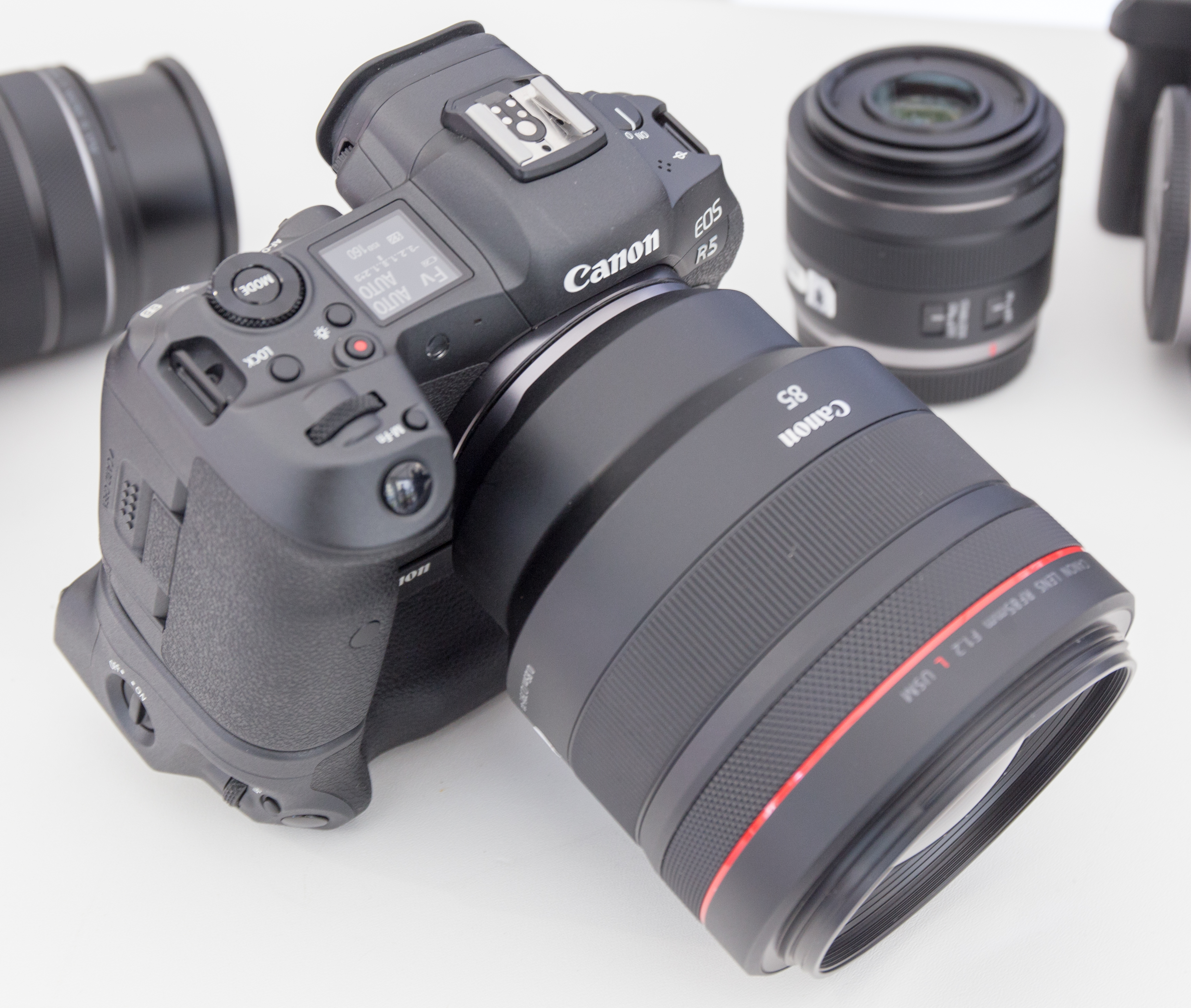
Canon EOS R5 with an RF 85mm f/1.2L USM lens, and extended battery pack base

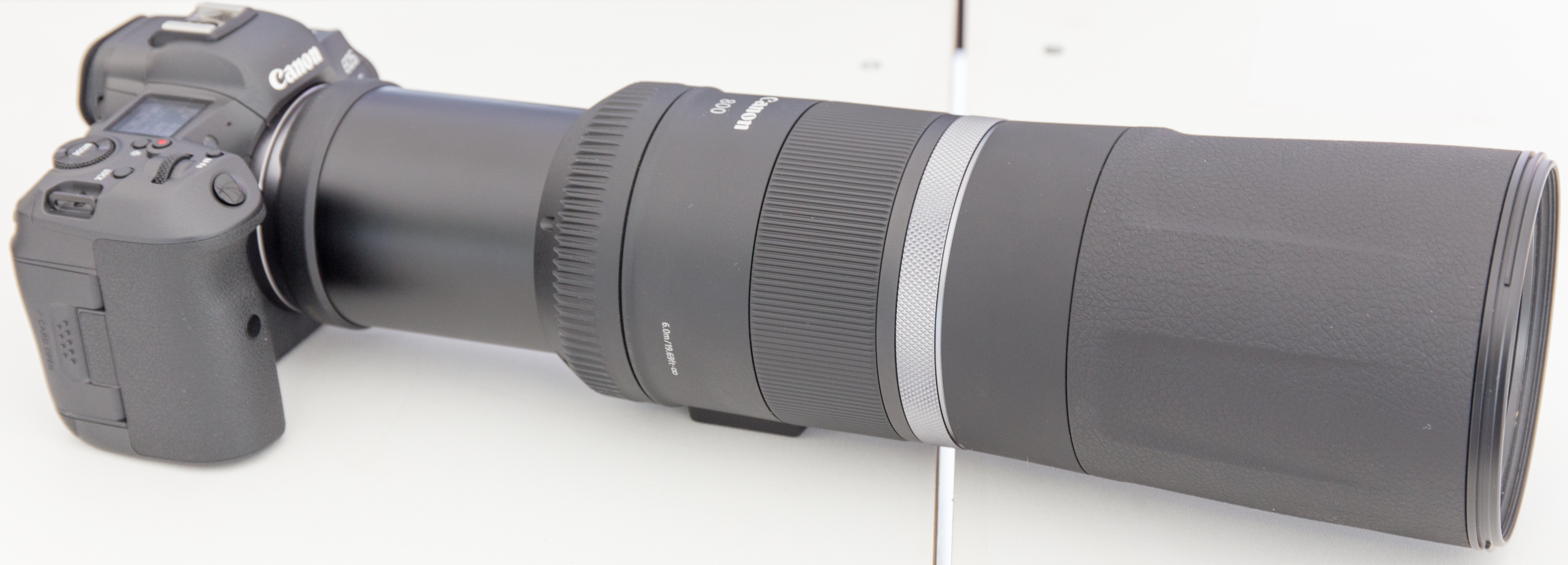
Canon EOS R5 with an RF 800mm f/11 IS STM lens

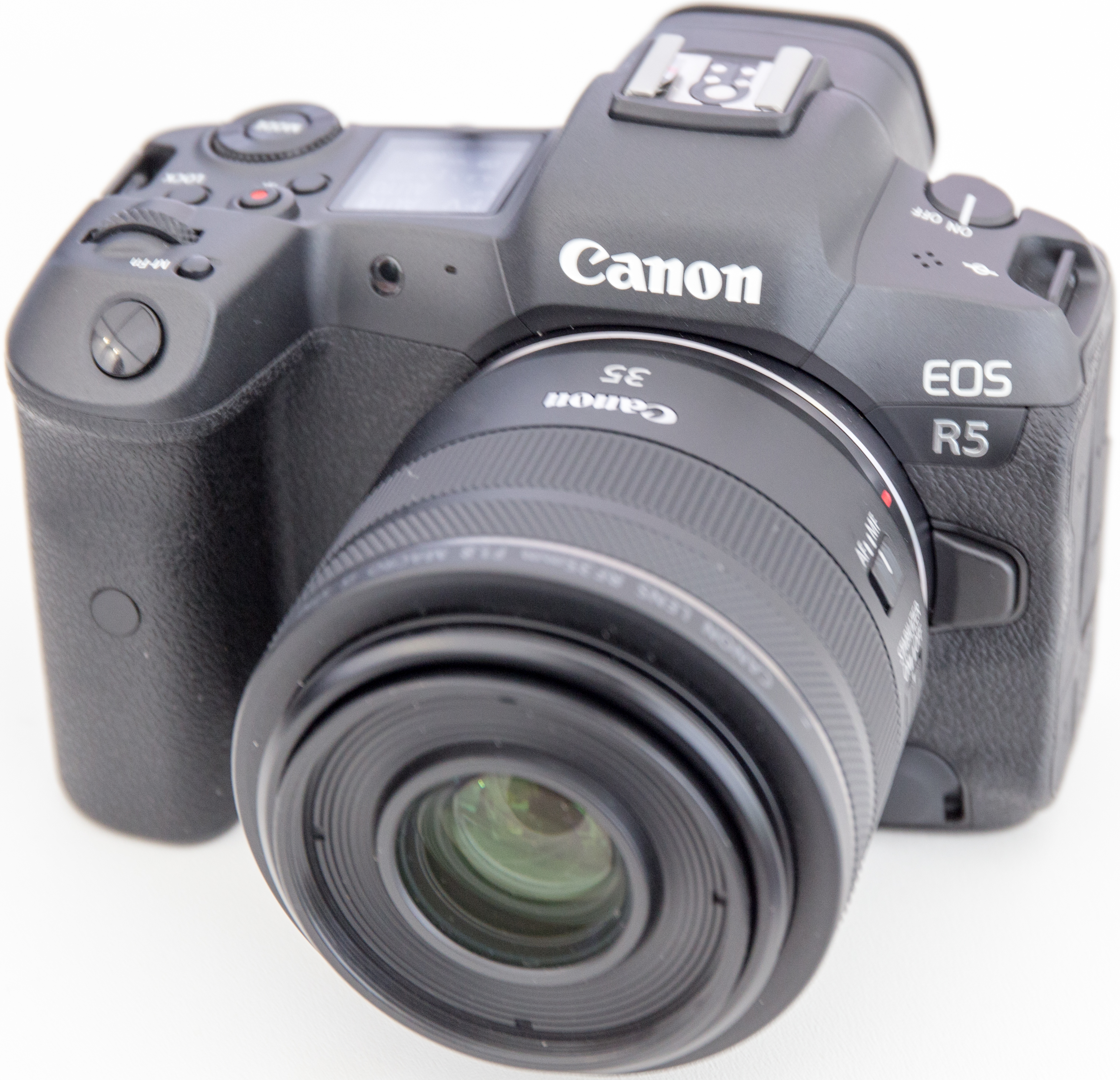
Canon EOS R5 with an RF 35mm f/1.8 Macro STM lens

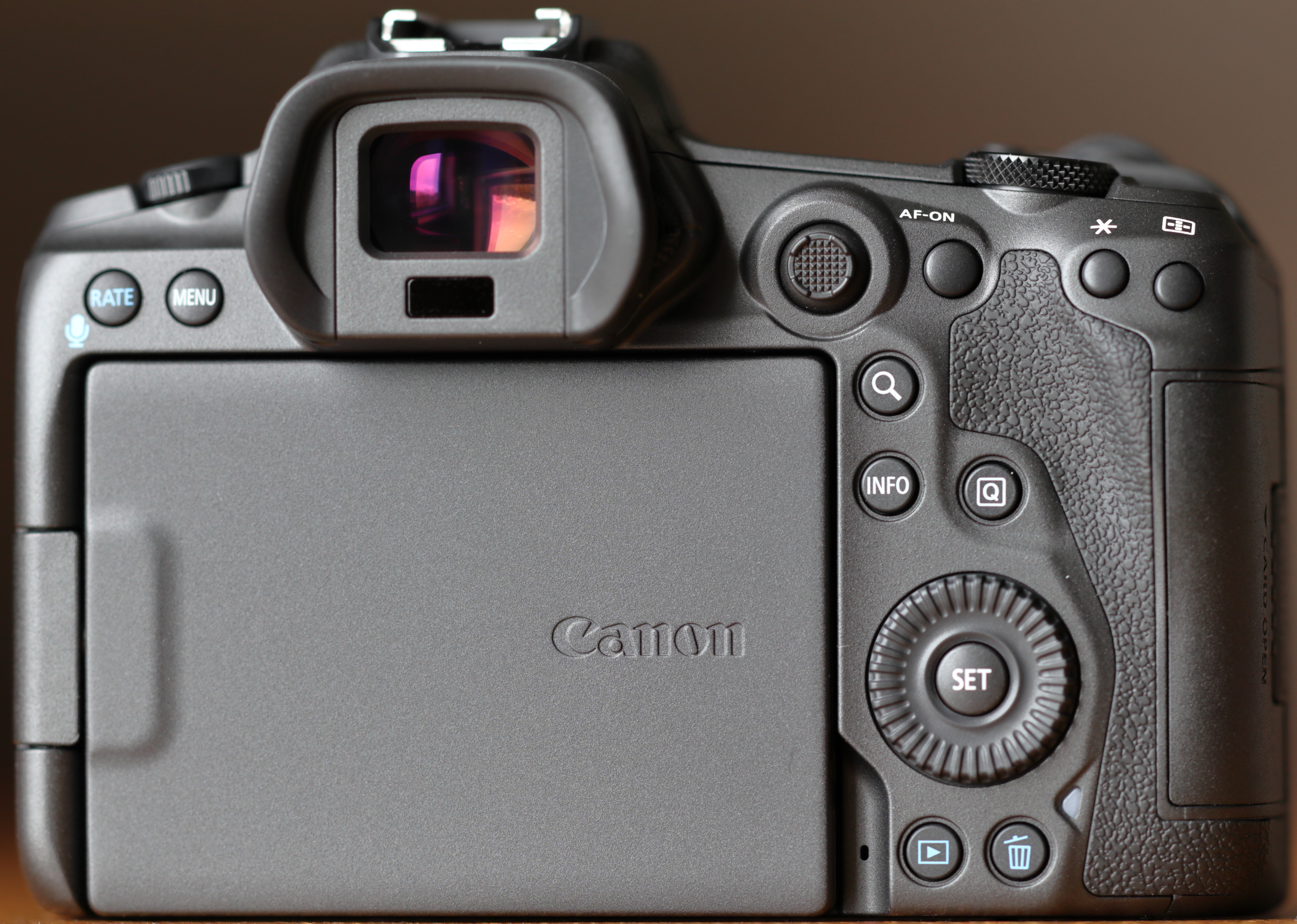
Rear view of the R5 with the articulating display facing inwards

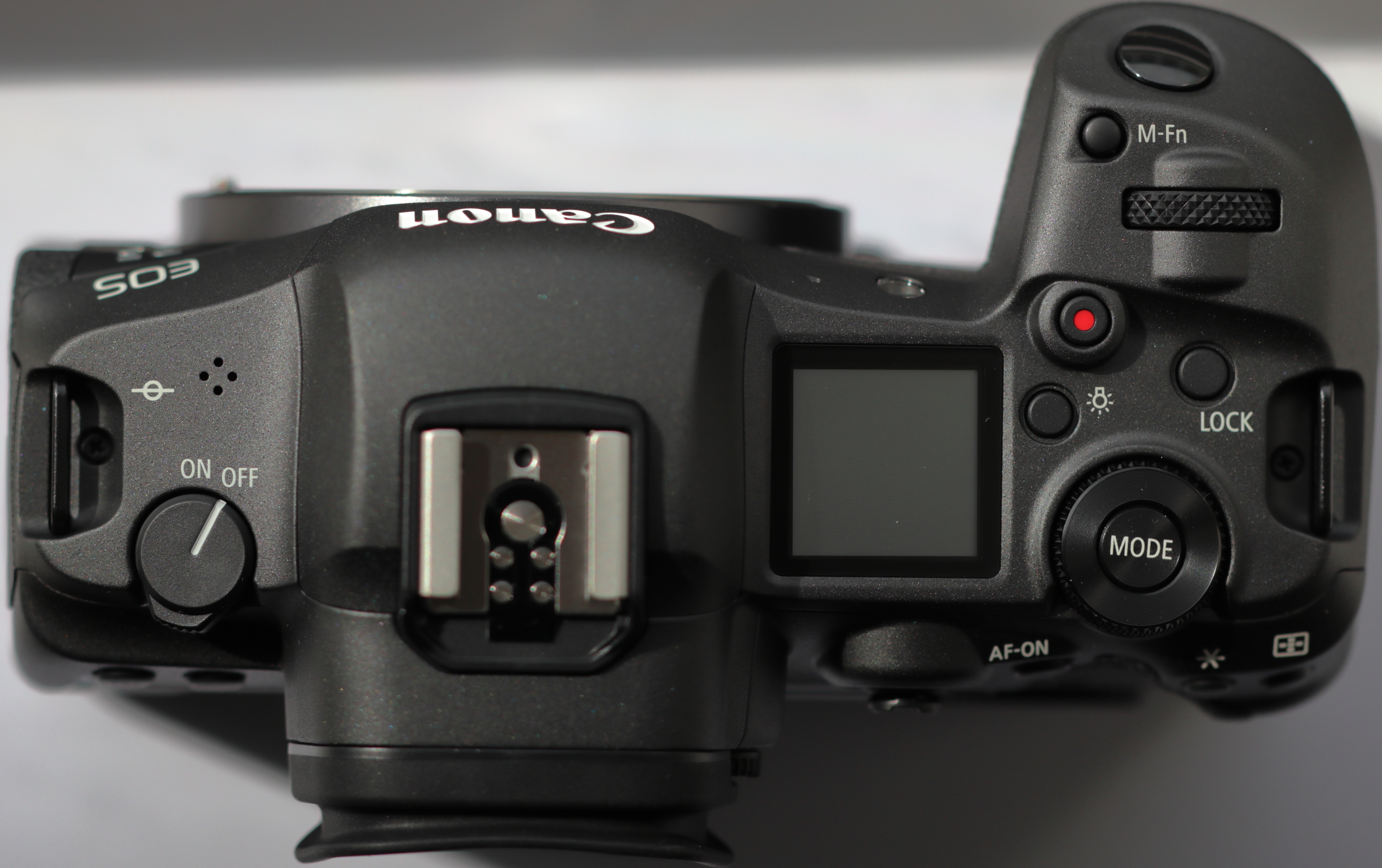
Top view of the R5 with no lens attached

== See also ==
- Canon EOS R1
- Canon EOS R3
- Canon EOS R6
- Canon EOS RP
- Canon EOS R

Sensor	Class	12	13	14	15	16	17	18	19	20	21	22	23	24	25	26
Full-frame	Flagship														_{m} R1 ^{ATS}	
Full-frame	Professional											_{m} R3 ^{ATS}				
Full-frame	Professional										R5 ^{ATSR}				_{m} R5 Mk II ^{ATSR}	
Full-frame	Professional											_{m} R5 C ^{ATCR}				
Full-frame	Advanced										R6 ^{ATS}		_{m} R6 Mk II ^{ATS}			_{m} R6 Mk III ^{ATS}
Full-frame	Advanced															R6 V ^{ATS}
Full-frame	Advanced									Ra ^{AT}						
Full-frame	Advanced								R ^{AT}							
Full-frame	Midrange													_{m} R8 ^{AT}		_{m} R8 Mk II ^{ATS}
Full-frame	Entry/mid								RP ^{AT}							
APS-C	Advanced												_{m} R7 ^{ATS}			
APS-C	Midrange						M5 ^{FT}						_{m} R10 ^{AT}			
APS-C	Entry/mid		_{x} M ^{T}	M2 ^{T}	M3 ^{FT}			M6 ^{FT}		M6 Mk II ^{FT}						
APS-C	Entry/mid								M50 ^{AT}		M50 Mk II ^{AT}			_{m} R50 ^{AT}		
APS-C	Entry/mid															_{m} R50 V ^{AT}
APS-C	Entry					M10 ^{FT}		M100 ^{FT}		M200 ^{FT}				R100		
Sensor	Class															
Sensor	Class	12	13	14	15	16	17	18	19	20	21	22	23	24	25	26
