= Canon EOS R7 =

2022 APS-C mirrorless camera

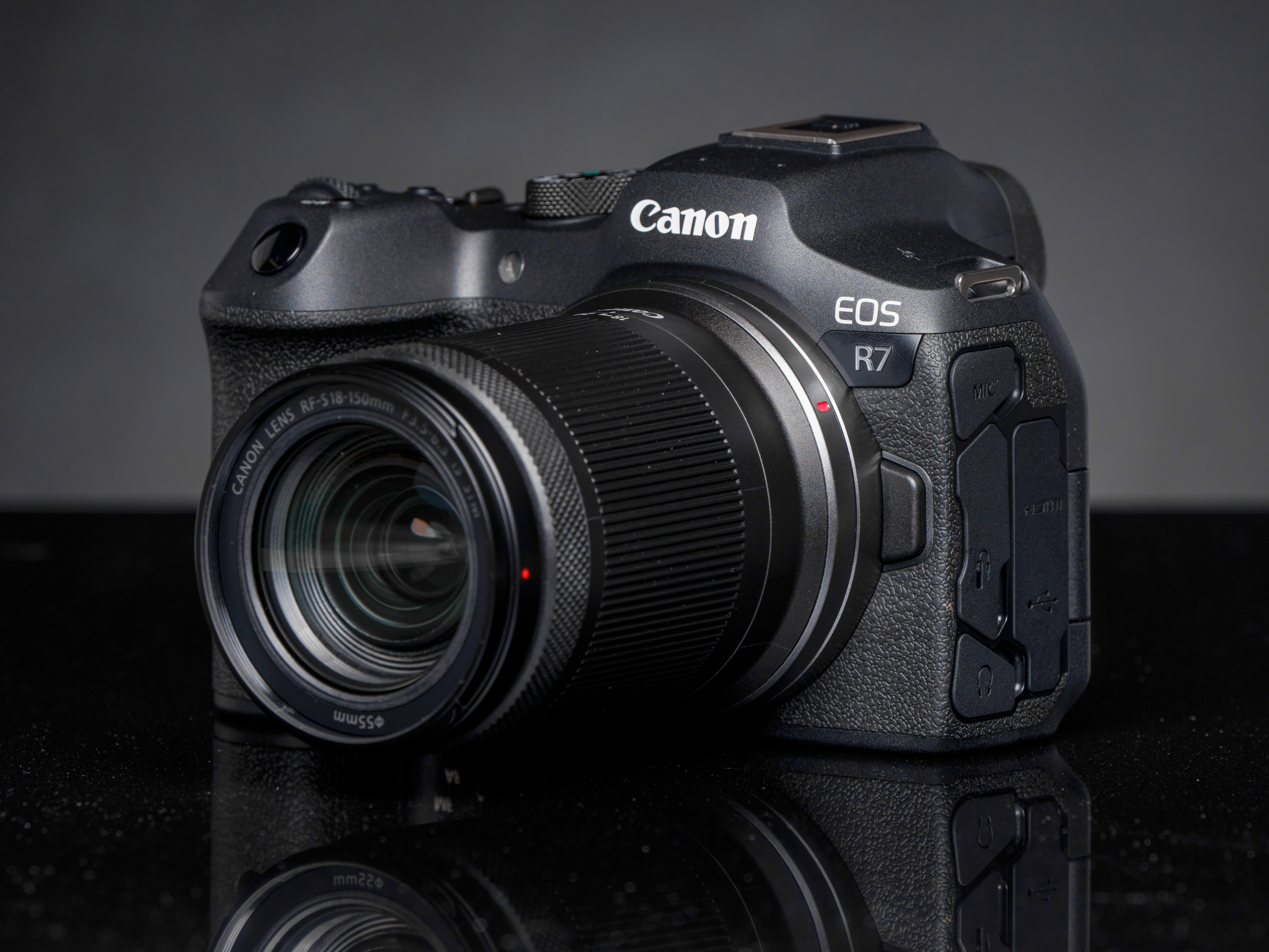
- Canon EOS R7 with RF-S 18-150mm f/3.5-6.3 IS STM kit lens

Overview
- Maker: Canon Inc.
- Type: Mirrorless interchangeable lens camera
- Released: 23 June 2022; 4 years ago
- Intro price: $1,499 (body only); $1,899 (with 18-150mm F3.5-6.3 IS STM)

Lens
- Lens mount: Canon RF
- Lens: Interchangeable

Sensor/medium
- Sensor type: Dual-Pixel FSI-CMOS sensor
- Sensor size: APS-C (22.3 x 14.9 mm)
- Sensor maker: Canon Inc.
- Maximum resolution: 6960 × 4640 pixels (32.5 effective megapixels)
- Film speed: ISO 100 – 32,000 expandable to 51,200
- Recording medium: 2× SDXC UHS-II compatible

Focusing
- Focus modes: One Shot; Servo AF; Auto Switch (only in A+ mode); Manual
- Focus areas: 651

Shutter
- Frame rate: 15 fps with mechanical shutter, 15 fps with first curtain electronic shutter, 30 fps with electronic shutter
- Shutter: Mechanical shutter first curtain electronic shutter electronic shutter
- Shutter speed range: 30s - 1/8000s (mechanical and first curtain electronic shutter) or 1/16000s (electronic shutter)

Viewfinder
- Viewfinder: 1024x768 (2.36-million dot) OLED EVF
- Viewfinder magnification: 1.15×
- Frame coverage: 100%

Image processing
- Image processor: DIGIC X

General
- Video recording: 4K video at up to 59.94 fps and 1080p video at up to 119.9 fps
- LCD screen: 3.2 in 1.62-million-dot LCD, fully articulating
- Battery: LP-E6NH
- AV port: Micro HDMI (Type D)
- Data port(s): USB 10Gbps (Type-C), Wi-Fi 4 (IEEE 802.11b/g/n), Bluetooth 4.2
- Body features: In-Body Image Stabillization
- Dimensions: 132 mm × 90 mm × 92 mm (5.2 in × 3.5 in × 3.6 in)
- Weight: 530 g (19 oz) (body only); 612 g (21.6 oz) (incl. battery and one memory card)
- Latest firmware: 1.6.0 / 30 October 2024; 2 years ago
- Made in: Japan

Chronology
- Predecessor: Canon EOS 7D Mark II (DSLR)

References
- "Canon : Product Manual : EOS R7 : Specifications". cam.start.canon. Canon U.S.A, Inc.

The Canon EOS R7 is a high-end semi-professional APS-C mirrorless interchangeable-lens camera produced by Canon. The camera was announced by Canon on May 24, 2022, alongside the Canon EOS R10 and released in Japan on June 23, 2022. The R7 and R10 were Canon's first two APS-C RF mount cameras. Two RF-S mount lenses were offered as kit lenses with the R7: the RF-S 18-150mm f/3.5-6.3 IS STM and the RF-S 18-45 f/4.5-6.3 IS STM.

== Main features ==
The R7 serves as Canon's top of the line APS-C camera, which was previously served by the 7D Mark II DSLR from 2014. The R7 adopts the 32.5-megapixel image sensor previously seen in the 90D, while continuing to deliver improvements brought about by the DIGIC X image processor and Canon's switch to a mirrorless system.

These are the main features of the R7:

- 32.5-megapixel APS-C CMOS sensor
- Dual Pixel CMOS AF II with human, animal and vehicle tracking
- High-speed continuous shooting of up to 15 fps with mechanical and first curtain electronic shutter; and up to 30fps with electronic shutter
- Sensor shift in-body image stabilization (IBIS) which can provide up to 7 stops of shake correction
- Automatic Leveling mode which uses the body's IBIS to compensate for moderate lateral tilt, keeping the sensor aligned with the horizon
- 4K/60 video recording capability with 64% sensor crop, or 100% crop video recording at 4K/30 oversampled from 7K resolution
- 1080p video recording at up to 120 fps
- HDR PQ or Canon Log 3 video recording
- 100% autofocus coverage (with Auto selection)
- 5,915 autofocus points, with 651 autofocus areas when automatically selected

Lens compatibility based on AF area: Refer to the Canon website

Number of AF area available for automatic selection

Focusing area	Horizontal: Approx. 100%, Vertical: Approx. 100%
Still photos	Max. 651 zones (31 × 21)
Movies	Max. 527 zones (31 × 17)

Selectable positions for AF point

Focusing area		Horizontal: Approx. 90%, Vertical: Approx. 100%
Numbers of positions	Still photos	Max. 5915 positions (91 × 65)
Numbers of positions	Movies	Max. 4823 positions (91 × 53)

When set to [1-point AF] and selected using the Multi-controller.

Metering sensor	384-zone (24×16) metering using image sensor output signals

- Native ISO range of 100 to 32000; expandable to 51200
- 0.39" 2.36 million dots OLED electronic viewfinder with 60/120fps selectable refresh rate, and a vari-angle LCD touchscreen
- Dual UHS-II SDXC memory card slots
- USB 10Gbps (USB Type-C) connector for charging and data transfer
- Built-in Wi-Fi 4 and Bluetooth 4.2 connectivity
- DIGIC X image processor
- Weather resistant
- Multi-Function Shoe: A hot shoe design compatible with a variety of accessories including an XLR microphone adapter
- Pre-shooting to capture a shot after it occurs.

== Third-party lenses ==
At the release of the R7 and R10 in 2022, reviewers noted that the selection of lenses for these cameras was limited and that the RF-S lenses released with them were consumer grade. On April 22, 2024, Sigma and Tamron announced that they had been licensed by Canon to make third-party lenses for its APS-C RF mount cameras like the R7 and R10. The next day, Digital Camera World reported that these would be "the first [third-party] autofocus RF lenses that Canon has allowed to remain on the market."

== Images ==
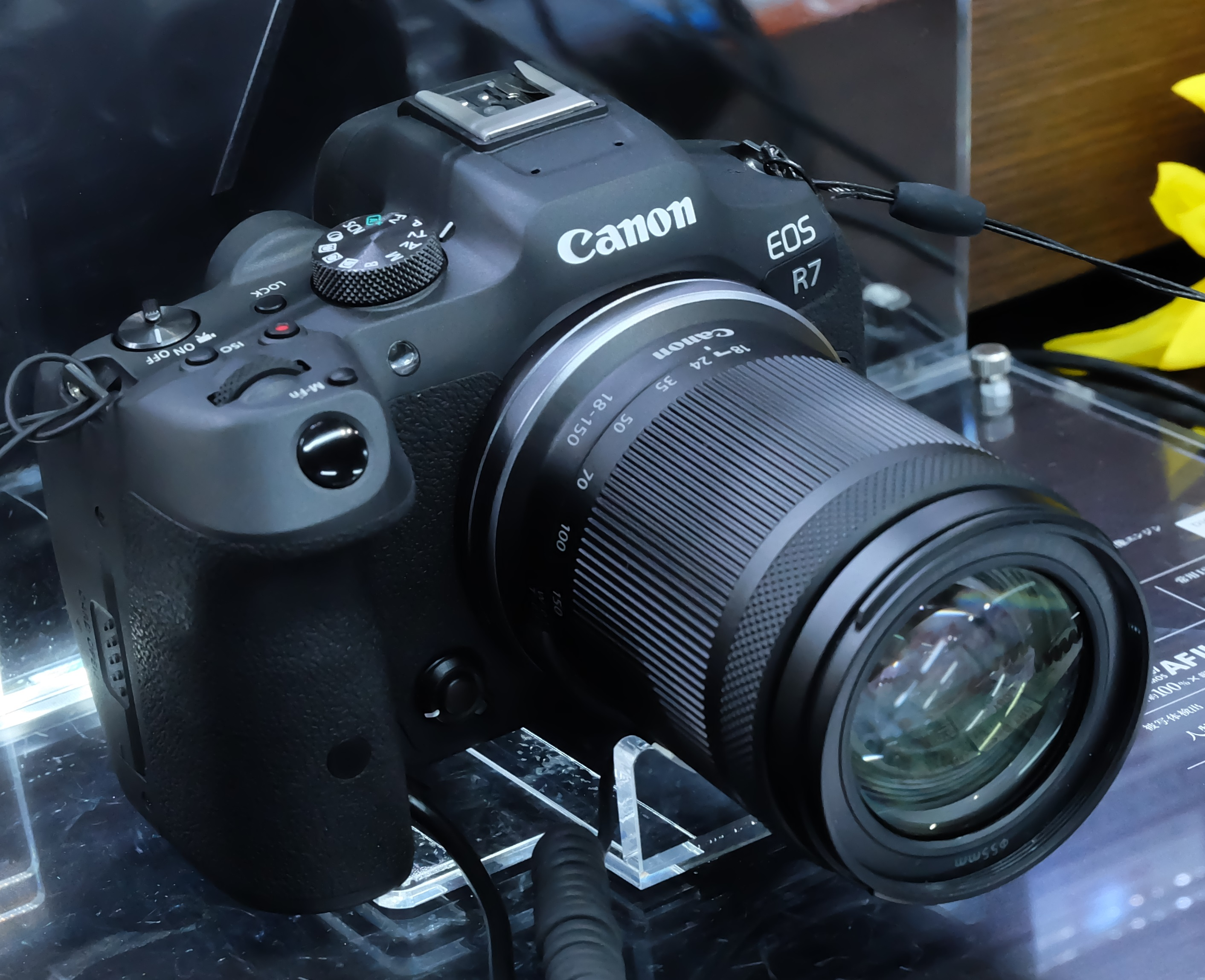

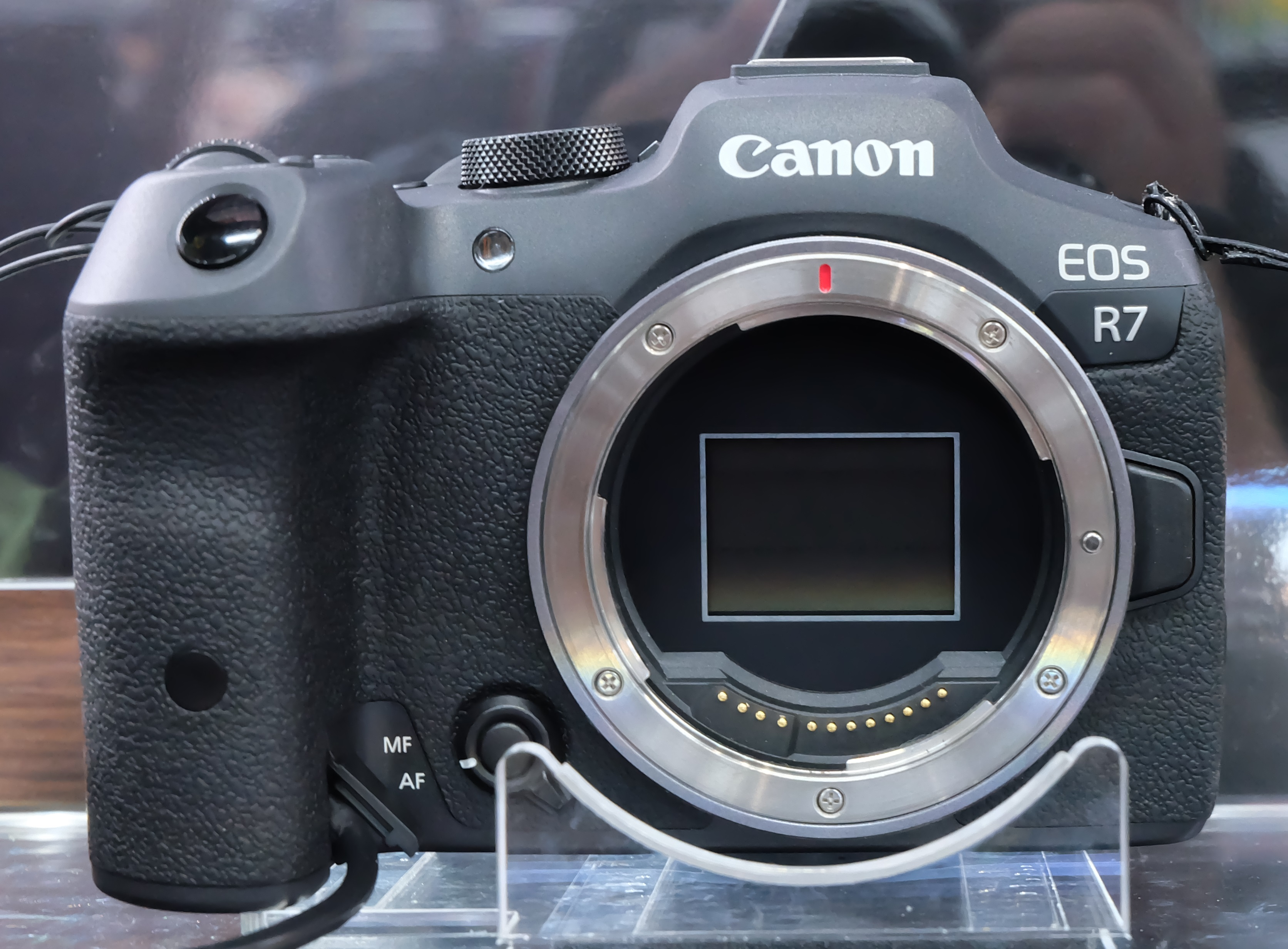

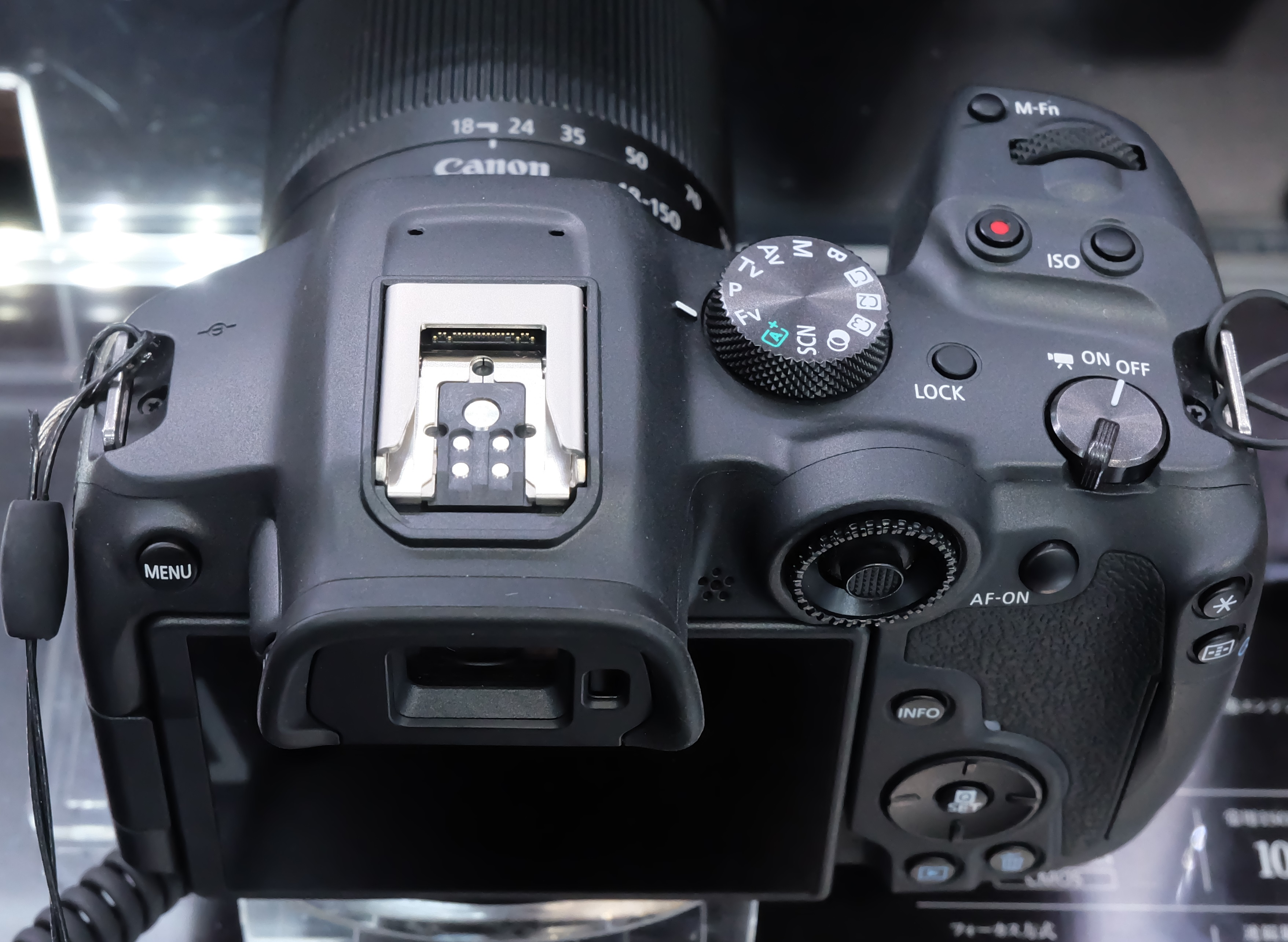

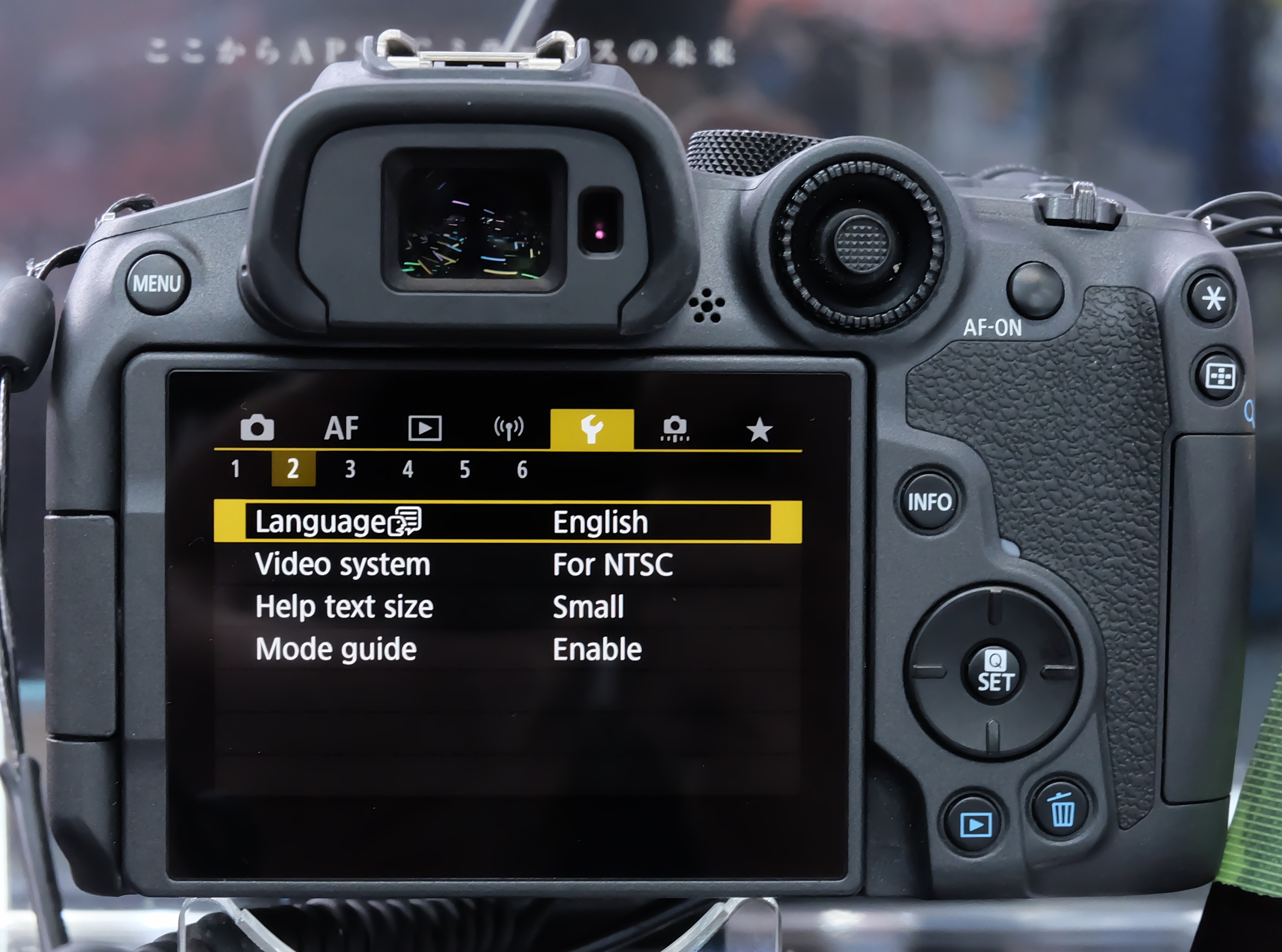

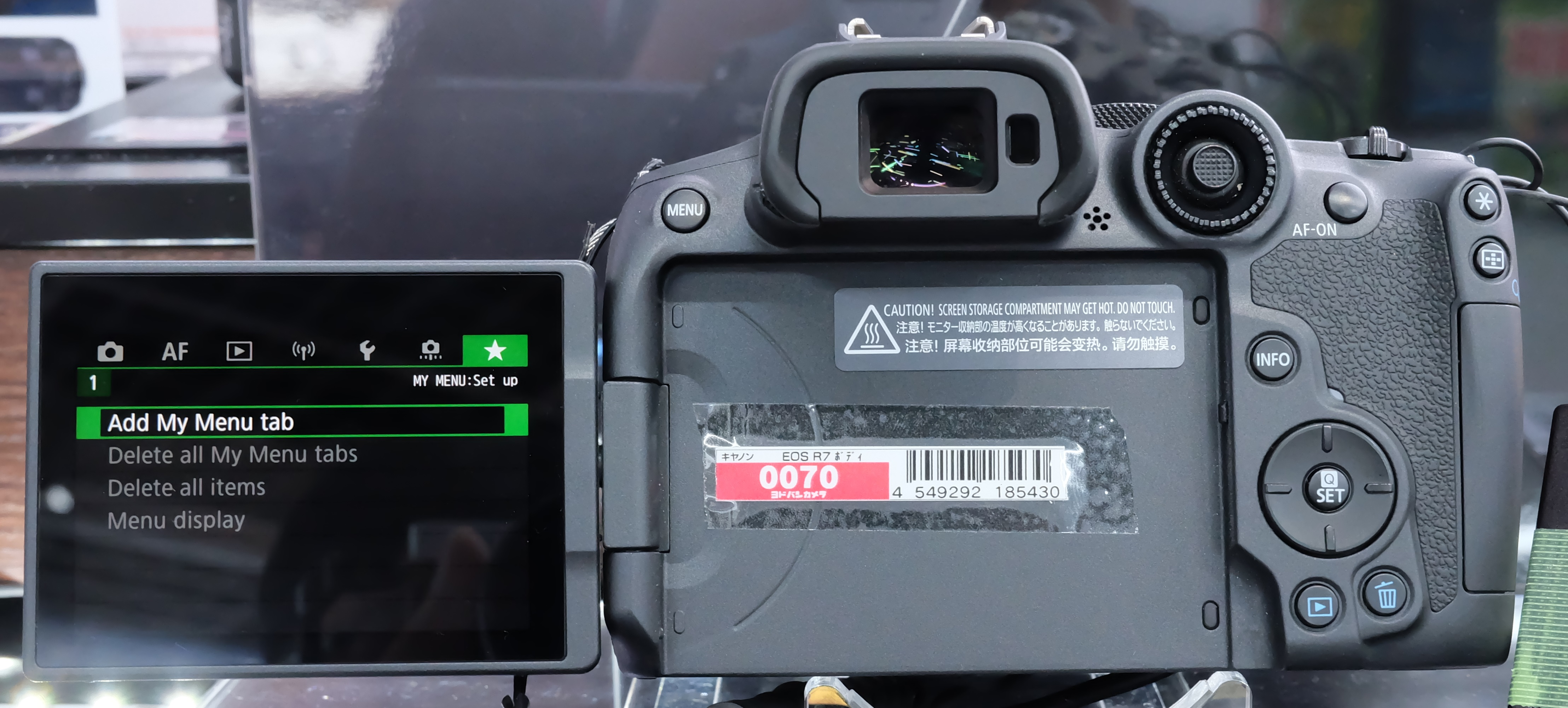

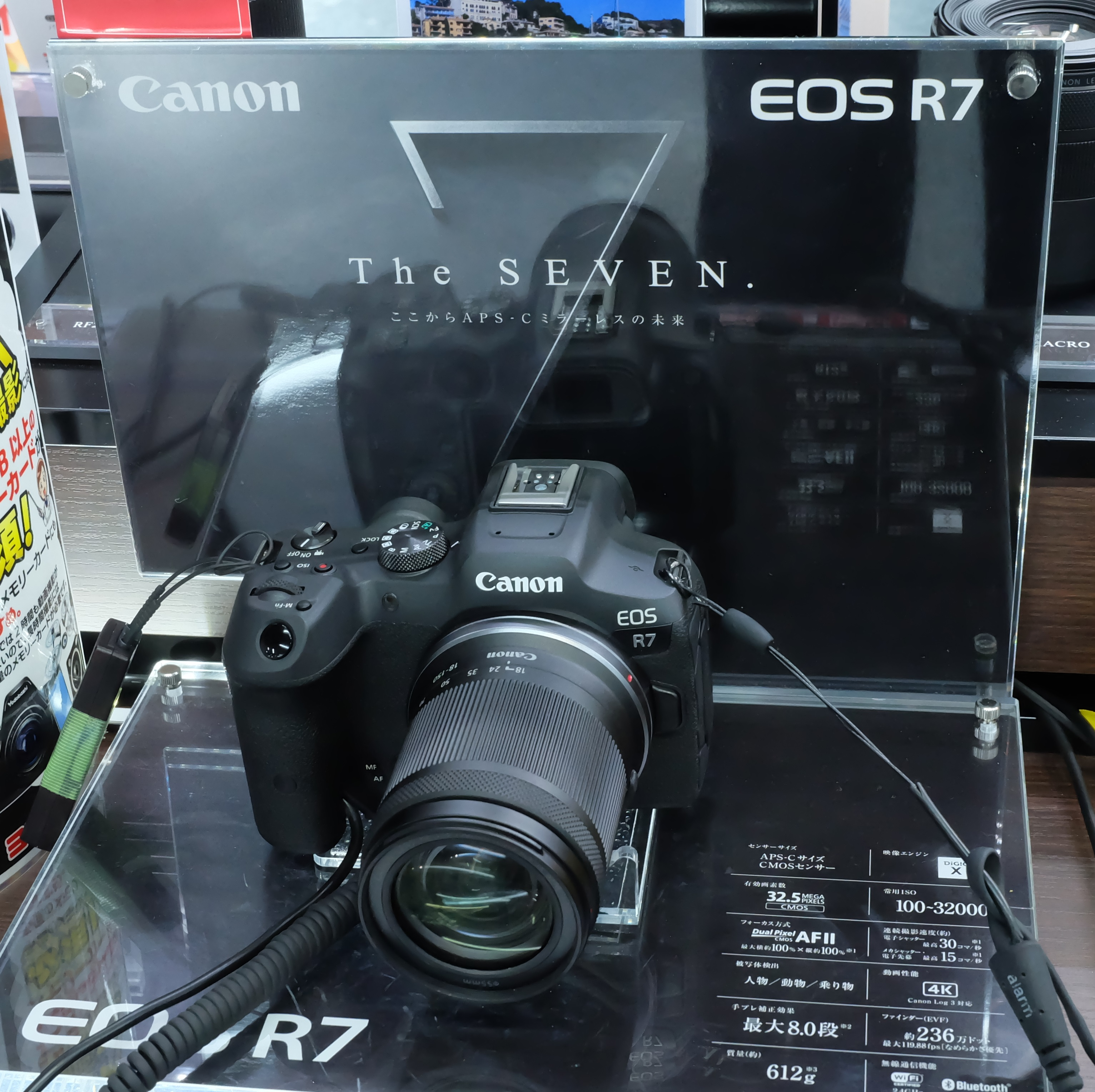

== See also ==
other Canon APS-C mirrorless cameras from the same period:

- Canon EOS R10
- Canon EOS R50
- Canon EOS R100

other weather resistant Canon mirrorless cameras from the same period:

- Canon EOS R5 Mark II
- Canon EOS R6 Mark II
- Canon EOS R8

other Canon APS-C cameras with sensors higher than 24 megapixels:

- Canon EOS 90D
- Canon EOS M6 Mark II

Sensor	Class	12	13	14	15	16	17	18	19	20	21	22	23	24	25	26
Full-frame	Flagship														_{m} R1 ^{ATS}	
Full-frame	Professional											_{m} R3 ^{ATS}				
Full-frame	Professional										R5 ^{ATSR}				_{m} R5 Mk II ^{ATSR}	
Full-frame	Professional											_{m} R5 C ^{ATCR}				
Full-frame	Advanced										R6 ^{ATS}		_{m} R6 Mk II ^{ATS}			_{m} R6 Mk III ^{ATS}
Full-frame	Advanced															R6 V ^{ATS}
Full-frame	Advanced									Ra ^{AT}						
Full-frame	Advanced								R ^{AT}							
Full-frame	Midrange													_{m} R8 ^{AT}		_{m} R8 Mk II ^{ATS}
Full-frame	Entry/mid								RP ^{AT}							
APS-C	Advanced												_{m} R7 ^{ATS}			
APS-C	Midrange						M5 ^{FT}						_{m} R10 ^{AT}			
APS-C	Entry/mid		_{x} M ^{T}	M2 ^{T}	M3 ^{FT}			M6 ^{FT}		M6 Mk II ^{FT}						
APS-C	Entry/mid								M50 ^{AT}		M50 Mk II ^{AT}			_{m} R50 ^{AT}		
APS-C	Entry/mid															_{m} R50 V ^{AT}
APS-C	Entry					M10 ^{FT}		M100 ^{FT}		M200 ^{FT}				R100		
Sensor	Class															
Sensor	Class	12	13	14	15	16	17	18	19	20	21	22	23	24	25	26
