= Canon EOS R6 =

2020 full-frame mirrorless camera

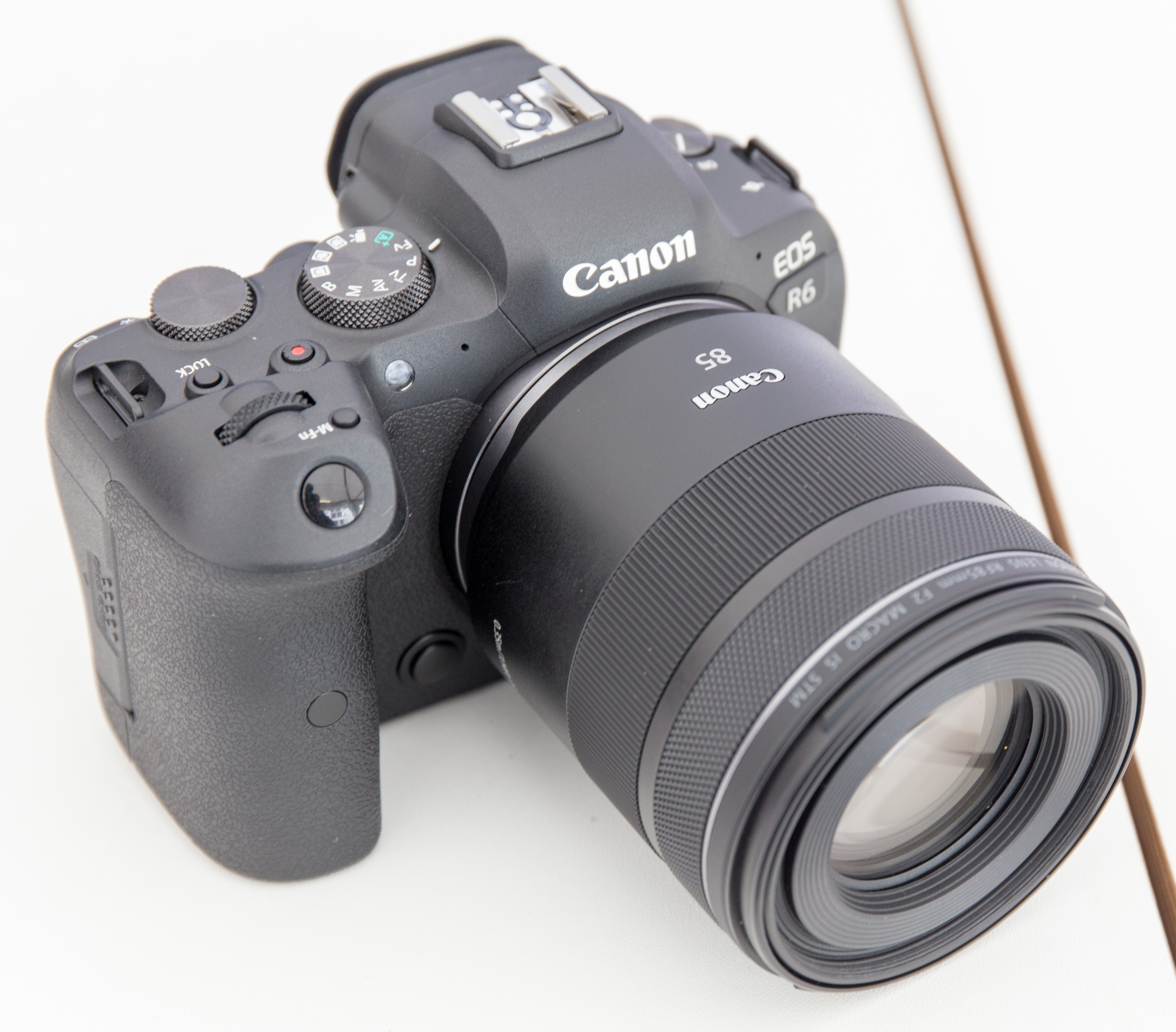
- EOS R6+RF85 mm F/2 MACRO IS STM

Overview
- Maker: Canon Inc.
- Type: Mirrorless interchangeable lens camera
- Released: July 09, 2020
- Intro price: $2,499.00 (body only) $2,899 (with RF 24-105 F4-7.1 IS STM) $3,599 (with RF 24-105 F4 L IS USM)

Lens
- Lens mount: Canon RF

Sensor/medium
- Sensor: dual-pixel CMOS sensor
- Sensor size: Full-frame (36 × 24 mm)
- Maximum resolution: 5472 × 3648 pixels (6.56 μm pixel size) (20.1 MP)
- Film speed: ISO 100 – 102,400 expandable to 204,800 and 50
- Recording medium: 2× SDXC UHS-II compatible

Focusing
- Focus: Dual Pixel CMOS AF II

Flash
- Flash exposure compensation: ± 3 stops in 1/3- or 1/2-stop increments

Shutter
- Frame rate: 20 fps with completely silent electronic shutter, 12 fps with mechanical shutter
- Shutter speeds: 30 s to 1/8000 s

Viewfinder
- Viewfinder: 3.69-million dot OLED EVF
- Viewfinder magnification: 0.76
- Frame coverage: 100%

Image processing
- Image processor: DIGIC X

General
- Video recording: 4K resolution (59.94 fps)
- LCD screen: 3.2 in 1.62-million-dot LCD
- Battery: LP-E6NH, LP-E6N, LP-E6; 360 shots (EVF); 510 shots (LCD) (CIPA rating)
- Optional battery packs: BG-R10 & BG-R20 grip allows the use of one LP-E6/N/H battery or two LP-E6/N/H batteries
- Data port(s): USB 3.1 Gen 2 USB-C, Wi-Fi, Bluetooth 4.2
- Dimensions: 138.4 mm × 97.5 mm × 88.4 mm (5.45 in × 3.84 in × 3.48 in)
- Weight: 598 g (21.1 oz) (body only), 680 g (24 oz) (incl. battery and memory card)
- Latest firmware: 1.9.0 / 20 September 2024; 15 months ago
- Made in: Japan

Chronology
- Predecessor: Canon EOS 6D Mark II (DSLR); Canon EOS R
- Successor: Canon EOS R6 Mark II

The Canon EOS R6 is an advanced full-frame mirrorless interchangeable-lens camera produced by Canon. The camera was announced by Canon on July 9, 2020, alongside the EOS R5.

== Features ==
- 20.1-megapixel full-frame CMOS sensor
- 4K 10-bit video recording at up to 60 fps
- 1080p video recording at up to 120 fps
- 100% autofocus coverage
- 1,053 autofocus points
- Native ISO range of 100 to 102,400; expandable to 204,800
- High-speed continuous shooting of up to 12 fps with mechanical shutter and electronic 1st curtain, and up to 20 fps with the electronic shutter
- 5-axis in-body image stabilization which can provide up to 8 stops of shake correction
- Dual UHS-II SD memory card slots
- 0.5" 3.69 million dots OLED electronic viewfinder with a 120 fps refresh rate, and a vari-angle LCD touchscreen
- Dual Pixel CMOS AF II
- Built-in Wi-Fi and Bluetooth connectivity
- Optional battery grip
- DIGIC X image processor
- Magnesium alloy chassis

Sensor	Class	12	13	14	15	16	17	18	19	20	21	22	23	24	25	26
Full-frame	Flagship														_{m} R1 ^{ATS}	
Full-frame	Professional											_{m} R3 ^{ATS}				
Full-frame	Professional										R5 ^{ATSR}				_{m} R5 Mk II ^{ATSR}	
Full-frame	Professional											_{m} R5 C ^{ATCR}				
Full-frame	Advanced										R6 ^{ATS}		_{m} R6 Mk II ^{ATS}			_{m} R6 Mk III ^{ATS}
Full-frame	Advanced									Ra ^{AT}						
Full-frame	Advanced								R ^{AT}							
Full-frame	Midrange													_{m} R8 ^{AT}		
Full-frame	Entry/mid								RP ^{AT}							
APS-C	Advanced												_{m} R7 ^{ATS}			
APS-C	Midrange						M5 ^{FT}						_{m} R10 ^{AT}			
APS-C	Entry/mid		_{x} M ^{T}	M2 ^{T}	M3 ^{FT}			M6 ^{FT}		M6 Mk II ^{FT}						
APS-C	Entry/mid								M50 ^{AT}		M50 Mk II ^{AT}			_{m} R50 ^{AT}		
APS-C	Entry/mid															_{m} R50 V ^{AT}
APS-C	Entry					M10 ^{FT}		M100 ^{FT}		M200 ^{FT}				R100		
Sensor	Class															
Sensor	Class	12	13	14	15	16	17	18	19	20	21	22	23	24	25	26
