= Canon EOS R8 =

2023 full-frame mirrorless camera

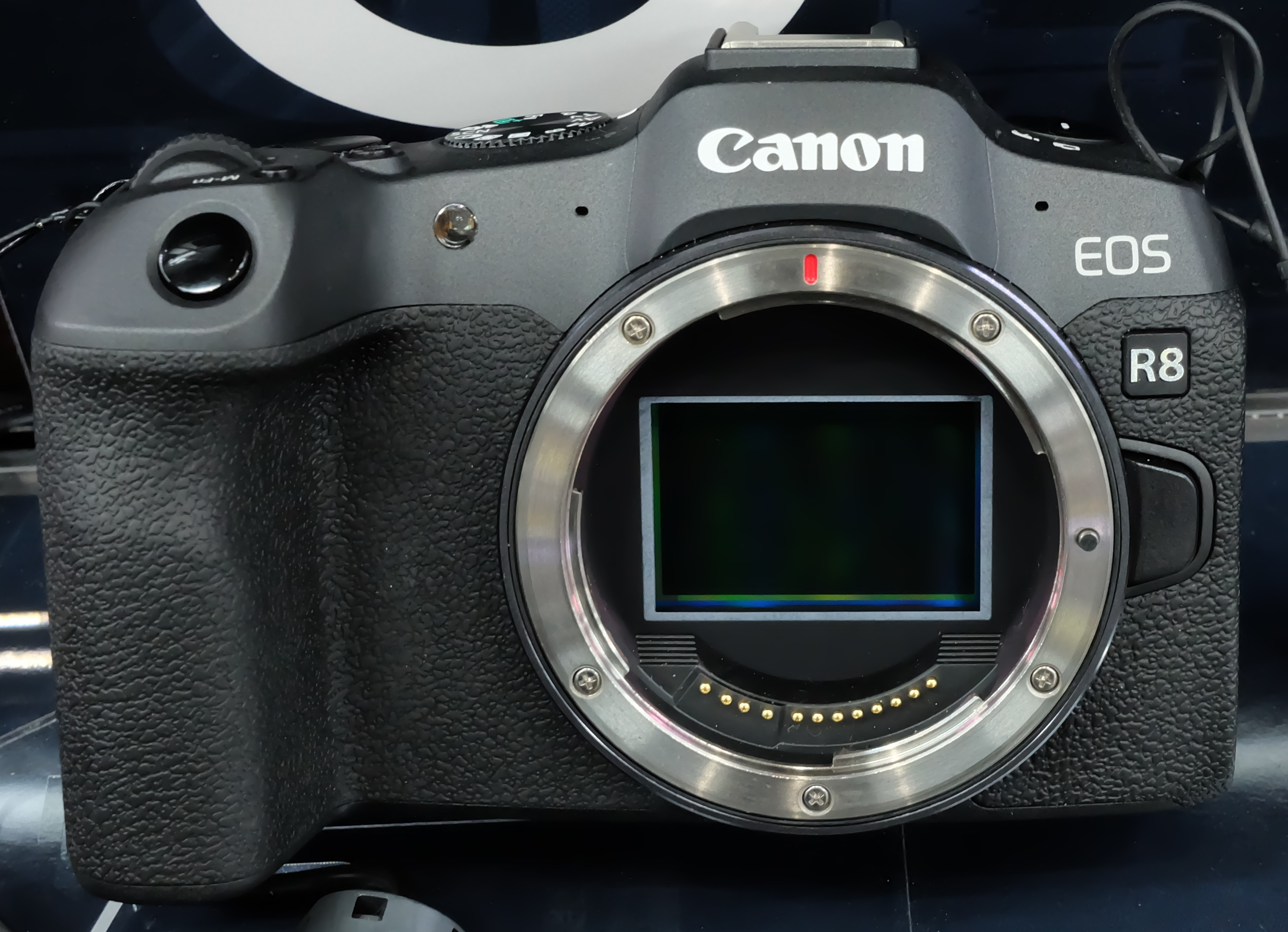

Overview
- Maker: Canon Inc.
- Type: Mirrorless interchangeable lens camera
- Released: 18 April 2023; 3 years ago
- Intro price: US$1,499 - body only US$1,699 - body-and-24-50mm f/4.5-6.3 IS STM Lens Kit

Lens
- Lens mount: Canon RF
- Lens: Interchangeable lens

Sensor/medium
- Sensor: Dual pixel CMOS sensor
- Sensor size: Full-frame (36 × 24 mm)
- Maximum resolution: 6,000 × 4,000 pixels (24.2 megapixels)
- Film speed: ISO 100–102,400 (expandable to 50–204,800)
- Recording medium: SD/SDHC/SDXC and UHS-II

Focusing
- Focus: Dual pixel CMOS AF II

Flash
- Flash exposure compensation: +/- 3EV in 1/3 or 1/2 stop increments with EL and EX series Speedlite flashes

Shutter
- Frame rate: 40 fps (6 first curtain shutter)
- Shutter speeds: 30–1/16,000

Viewfinder
- Viewfinder: 2.36 million dots OLED colour EVF
- Viewfinder magnification: 0.70×
- Frame coverage: 100%

Image processing
- Image processor: DIGIC X

General
- Video recording: 4K resolution (59.94 fps)
- LCD screen: 7.5cm (3.0") Clear View LCD II, approx. 1.62 million dots
- Battery: LP-E17
- Data port(s): Wi-Fi and Bluetooth
- Dimensions: 132.5 mm × 86.1 mm × 70.0 mm (5.22 in × 3.39 in × 2.76 in)
- Weight: 414 g (14.6 oz) (body only), 461 g (16.3 oz) (incl. battery and memory card)
- Latest firmware: 1.5.0, released July 2025
- Made in: Japan

Chronology
- Predecessor: Canon EOS RP
- Successor: Canon EOS R8 Mark II

The Canon EOS R8 is a mid-ranged full-frame mirrorless interchangeable-lens camera launched by Canon in April 2023. It inherits many key features of the Canon EOS R6 Mark II and uses a very similar chassis to the Canon EOS RP. It was succeeded by the Canon EOS R8 Mark II in October 2026

The Canon EOS R8 was announced on February 8, 2023 and launched on April 18, 2023, together with the Canon EOS R50, with a suggested retail price of US$1,499 (body only).

In September 2026, Canon unveiled the EOS R8 Mark II, which adds in-body image stabilization (IBIS) and a joystick among its improvements.

== Features ==
The Canon EOS R8 is offered as body-only or in a body-and-lens kit package with a Canon RF 24-50mm f 4.5-6.3 IS STM zoom lens at a suggested retail price of US$1,699.

=== Image features ===
The Canon EOS R8 largely shares the imaging system of the Canon EOS R6 Mark II, including a 24.2 megapixel full-frame CMOS sensor, an advanced Dual Pixel AF system with tracking and subject recognition capabilities, as well as a DIGIC X processor. However, it omits in-body image stabilization to keep the body size the same as the Canon EOS RP.

=== ISO ===
The EOS R8 has a maximum ISO sensitivity of 102,400 (expandable to 204,800) and a minimum of 100 (expandable to 50), and in video it can capture up to ISO 25,600 (expandable to 102,400).

=== Shutter ===
The camera has an electronic shutter that shoots up to 40 frames per second and an electronic first curtain shutter that eliminates rolling-shutter and shoots up to 6 frames per second.

=== Focusing ===
The EOS R8 uses Canon’s Dual Pixel CMOS AF II system to capture and record and offers 100% horizontal and 100% vertical focus coverage with Face + Tracking and Auto Selection modes and 100% horizontal and 90% vertical focus coverage with manual selection and large zone modes. It has 4897 AF points.

=== Video ===
The EOS R8 can record video with up to 4K UHD (3840 × 2160) resolution at 59.94 frames per second with 10-bit color and support for HDR and C-Log3 profiles (oversampled from 6k). It can shoot up to 180 fps in Full HD giving the option for slow-motion. It also offers 3–5 seconds pre-record capability, which adds 3–5 seconds of footage before pressing the shutter.

=== Ergonomics ===
The EOS R8 weighs 414 g (461 g with card and battery), which makes it the lightest full-frame camera on the market. Its design is based on its predecessor, the Canon EOS RP.

On the back it has a 7.5 cm (3.0’’) Clear View LCD II fully-articulating touchscreen with a resolution of approximately 1.62 million pixels. It also features a 0.39 inch OLED color EVF that has a resolution of 2.36 million dots (1024 × 768) and 0.7x magnification, identical to its predecessor.

This camera is weather resistant.

== Lenses ==
The EOS R8 uses Canon's RF lens mount. It is possible to use older EF and EF-S lenses with the use of an EF/EF-S to RF adapter. At launch it had 38 native lenses available. Due to its full-frame sensor, RF and EF lenses are uncropped when used on the EOS R8.

== See also ==
- List of lightest mirrorless cameras

other weather resistant Canon mirrorless cameras from the same period:

- Canon EOS R5 Mark II
- Canon EOS R6 Mark II
- Canon EOS R7

Sensor	Class	12	13	14	15	16	17	18	19	20	21	22	23	24	25	26
Full-frame	Flagship														_{m} R1 ^{ATS}	
Full-frame	Professional											_{m} R3 ^{ATS}				
Full-frame	Professional										R5 ^{ATSR}				_{m} R5 Mk II ^{ATSR}	
Full-frame	Professional											_{m} R5 C ^{ATCR}				
Full-frame	Advanced										R6 ^{ATS}		_{m} R6 Mk II ^{ATS}			_{m} R6 Mk III ^{ATS}
Full-frame	Advanced															R6 V ^{ATS}
Full-frame	Advanced									Ra ^{AT}						
Full-frame	Advanced								R ^{AT}							
Full-frame	Midrange													_{m} R8 ^{AT}		_{m} R8 Mk II ^{ATS}
Full-frame	Entry/mid								RP ^{AT}							
APS-C	Advanced												_{m} R7 ^{ATS}			
APS-C	Midrange						M5 ^{FT}						_{m} R10 ^{AT}			
APS-C	Entry/mid		_{x} M ^{T}	M2 ^{T}	M3 ^{FT}			M6 ^{FT}		M6 Mk II ^{FT}						
APS-C	Entry/mid								M50 ^{AT}		M50 Mk II ^{AT}			_{m} R50 ^{AT}		
APS-C	Entry/mid															_{m} R50 V ^{AT}
APS-C	Entry					M10 ^{FT}		M100 ^{FT}		M200 ^{FT}				R100		
Sensor	Class															
Sensor	Class	12	13	14	15	16	17	18	19	20	21	22	23	24	25	26
