= Canon EOS R6 Mark II =

2022 full-frame mirrorless camera

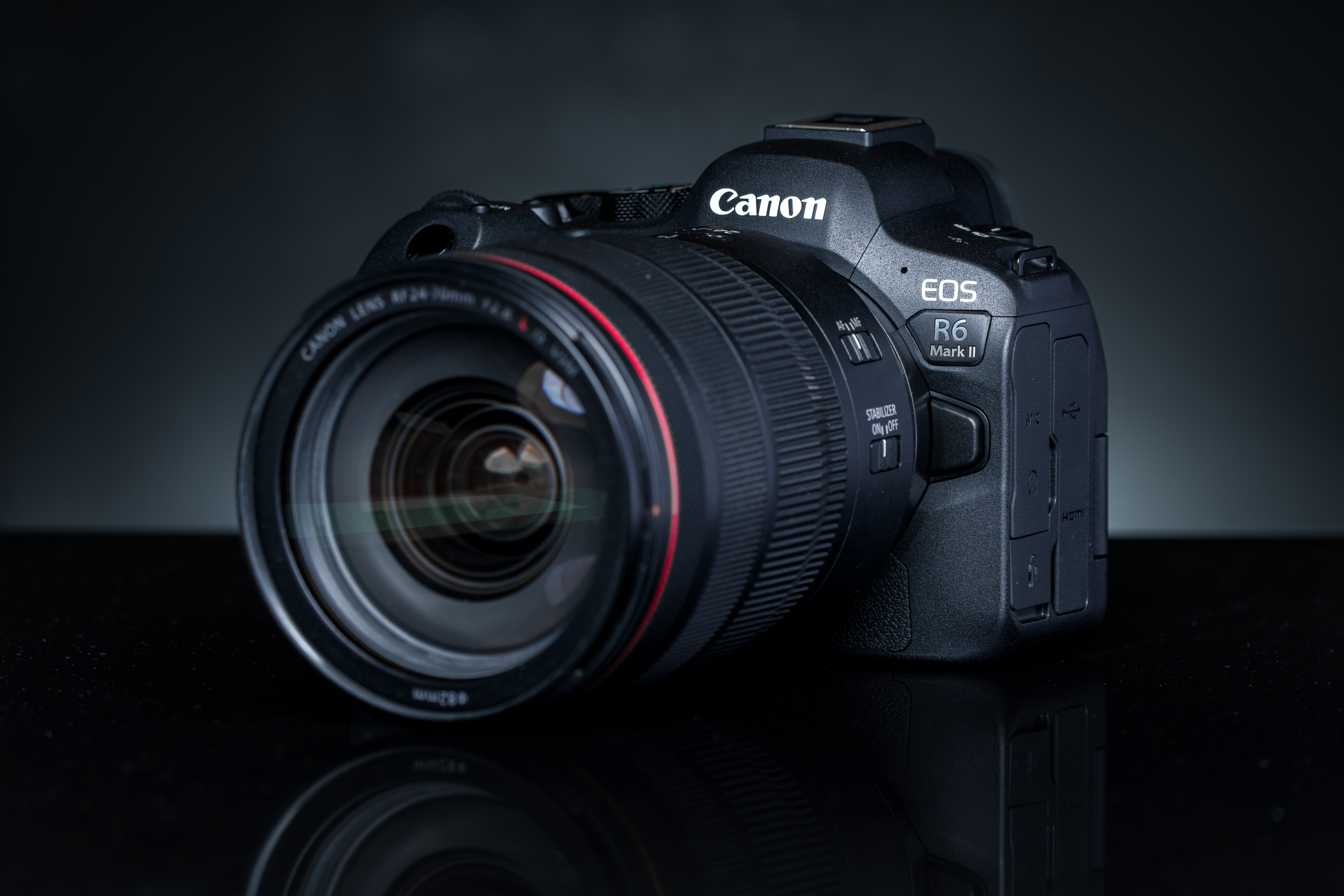
- The Canon EOS R6 Mark II, pictured with an RF 24-70 mm F2.8 L IS USM lens.

Overview
- Maker: Canon Inc.
- Type: Mirrorless interchangeable lens camera
- Released: November 2, 2022
- Intro price: $2,499.00 (body only) $2,799 (with RF 24-105 F4-7.1 IS STM) $3,599 (with RF 24-105 F4 L IS USM)

Lens
- Lens mount: Canon RF

Sensor/medium
- Sensor: Dual-pixel CMOS sensor
- Sensor type: Full-frame 35mm
- Sensor size: Full-frame (36 × 24 mm)
- Maximum resolution: 6000 × 4000 pixels (24.2 MP)
- Film speed: ISO 100– 102,400, expandable to 50 and 204,801
- Recording medium: 2× SDXC UHS-II compatible

Focusing
- Focus: Dual Pixel CMOS autofocus
- Focus modes: One Shot, Servo AF, AI Focus AF

Flash
- Flash exposure compensation: ± 3 stops in 1/3- or 1/2-stop increments

Shutter
- Frame rate: 40 fps with electronic shutter, 12 fps with mechanical shutter
- Shutter speeds: 30 s to 1/8000 s; up to 1/16000 s with electronic shutter

Viewfinder
- Viewfinder: 3.69-million dot OLED EVF
- Viewfinder magnification: 0.76x
- Frame coverage: 100%

Image processing
- Image processor: DIGIC X

General
- Video recording: 6K/60p (with external recorder); 4K/60p internal (oversampled from 6K)
- LCD screen: 3.0 in 1.62-million-dot LCD
- Battery: LP-E6NH, LP-E6N, LP-E6; 320 shots (EVF); 580 shots (LCD) (CIPA rating)
- Optional battery packs: BG-R10 & BG-R20 grip allows the use of one LP-E6/N/H battery or two LP-E6/N/H batteries
- Data port(s): USB 3.2 Gen 2, USB-C, Wi-Fi, Bluetooth 5.0, MicroHDMI
- Dimensions: 138.4 mm × 98.4 mm × 88.4 mm (5.45 in × 3.87 in × 3.48 in)
- Weight: 588 g (20.7 oz) (body only), 670 g (24 oz) (incl. battery and memory card)
- Latest firmware: 1.7.0 / Released 13 May 2026
- Made in: Japan

Chronology
- Predecessor: Canon EOS R6
- Successor: Canon EOS R6 Mark III

The Canon EOS R6 Mark II is a full-frame mirrorless interchangeable-lens camera produced by Canon. It was announced as the successor to the Canon EOS R6 on November 2, 2022. It includes various systems developed for the Canon EOS R3 in a more compact body. It was generally well-received, with reviewers praising its hybrid capabilities but criticising the lack of support for third-party lenses at the time.

== Features ==
- 24.2 megapixel full-frame CMOS sensor
- Continuous shooting at 12 fps with mechanical shutter / 40 fps with electronic shutter
- DIGIC X image processor
- 6K video recording at 60 fps, including ProRes RAW output with external storage medium
- 1080p video recording at 180 fps
- 100% autofocus coverage
- 1,053 autofocus points
- Native ISO range of 100 to 102,400; expandable to 50 and 204,800
- 8 stops of 5-axis in-body image stabilization
- Dual UHS-II SD memory card slots
- 0.5" 3.69 million dots OLED electronic viewfinder with a 120 fps refresh rate
- Vari-angle LCD touchscreen
- Dual Pixel CMOS AF II
- Weather resistance

== See also ==
Other weather-resistant Canon mirrorless cameras from the same period:

- Canon EOS R5 Mark II
- Canon EOS R7
- Canon EOS R8

Sensor	Class	12	13	14	15	16	17	18	19	20	21	22	23	24	25	26
Full-frame	Flagship														_{m} R1 ^{ATS}	
Full-frame	Professional											_{m} R3 ^{ATS}				
Full-frame	Professional										R5 ^{ATSR}				_{m} R5 Mk II ^{ATSR}	
Full-frame	Professional											_{m} R5 C ^{ATCR}				
Full-frame	Advanced										R6 ^{ATS}		_{m} R6 Mk II ^{ATS}			_{m} R6 Mk III ^{ATS}
Full-frame	Advanced															R6 V ^{ATS}
Full-frame	Advanced									Ra ^{AT}						
Full-frame	Advanced								R ^{AT}							
Full-frame	Midrange													_{m} R8 ^{AT}		_{m} R8 Mk II ^{ATS}
Full-frame	Entry/mid								RP ^{AT}							
APS-C	Advanced												_{m} R7 ^{ATS}			
APS-C	Midrange						M5 ^{FT}						_{m} R10 ^{AT}			
APS-C	Entry/mid		_{x} M ^{T}	M2 ^{T}	M3 ^{FT}			M6 ^{FT}		M6 Mk II ^{FT}						
APS-C	Entry/mid								M50 ^{AT}		M50 Mk II ^{AT}			_{m} R50 ^{AT}		
APS-C	Entry/mid															_{m} R50 V ^{AT}
APS-C	Entry					M10 ^{FT}		M100 ^{FT}		M200 ^{FT}				R100		
Sensor	Class															
Sensor	Class	12	13	14	15	16	17	18	19	20	21	22	23	24	25	26
