= Canon EOS RP =

2019 full-frame mirrorless camera

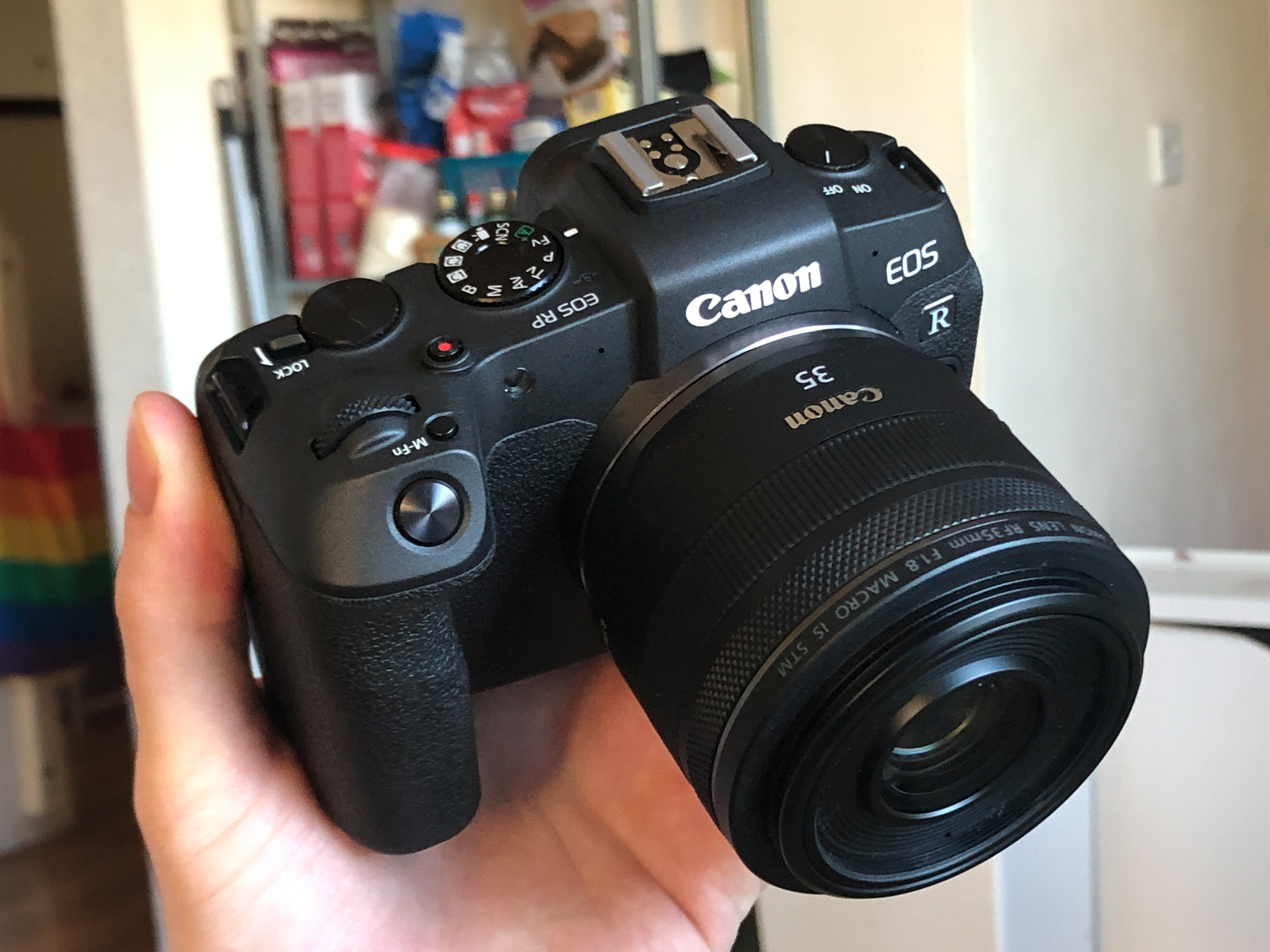
- Canon EOS RP with RF35mm f/1.8 STM

Overview
- Maker: Canon Inc.
- Type: Mirrorless interchangeable lens camera
- Released: 14 March 2019; 7 years ago
- Intro price: US$1,299 - body only US$2,399 - body-and-lens kit

Lens
- Lens mount: Canon RF
- Lens: Interchangeable lens

Sensor/medium
- Sensor: dual-pixel CMOS sensor
- Sensor size: Full-frame (36 × 24 mm)
- Maximum resolution: 6240 × 4160 pixels (26.2 megapixels)
- Film speed: ISO 100 – 40,000 expandable to ISO 50 (L); 51,200 (H1), 102,400 (H2)
- Recording medium: SDXC (UHS-II capable)

Focusing
- Focus: Dual Pixel CMOS autofocus

Flash
- Flash exposure compensation: ± 3 stops in 1/3- or 1/2-stop increments

Shutter
- Frame rate: 5 fps
- Shutter speeds: 30 s to 1/4000 s

Viewfinder
- Viewfinder: 2.360-million dot OLED EVF
- Viewfinder magnification: 0.70
- Frame coverage: 100%

Image processing
- Image processor: DIGIC 8

General
- Video recording: 4K resolution (23.98/25 fps)
- LCD screen: Variangle 3.0 in 720 × 480 pixels LCD with touchscreen
- Battery: LP-E17
- Data port(s): Wi-Fi and Bluetooth
- Dimensions: 132.5 mm × 85.0 mm × 70.0 mm (5.22 in × 3.35 in × 2.76 in)
- Weight: 440 g (16 oz) (body only), 485 g (17.1 oz) (incl. battery and memory card)
- Made in: Japan

Chronology
- Predecessor: Canon EOS 6D Mark II (DSLR)
- Successor: Canon EOS R8

The Canon EOS RP is a 26.2-megapixel full-frame mirrorless interchangeable-lens camera launched by Canon in March 2019. The camera is reported to be the least expensive digital full-frame camera to be produced. In addition to the standard black model, 5000 units of a limited edition gold model were sold in Japan to commemorate the Tokyo 2020 Olympic Games.

== Features ==
The EOS RP was announced on February 13, 2019 and launched on March 14, 2019 with a suggested retail price of US$1,299 (body only) at the time. The Canon EOS RP is offered as a body only or in a body-and-lens kit package with a Canon RF 24-105mm F4L IS USM zoom lens at a suggested retail price of US$2,399.

The "R" in EOS RP comes from the first letter of "Reimagine optical excellence", Canon's development concept for the EOS R system as a whole. The "P" stands for ‘Popular’, in the Japanese sense of meaning ‘for everybody’.

=== Image features ===
The Canon EOS RP features a 35 mm (36 mm × 24 mm) (full-frame) CMOS sensor capable of capturing approximately 26.2 effective megapixels. The camera features the DIGIC 8 image processor, first introduced in February 2018. The EOS RP does not have in-body image stabilization, however, image stabilization can be achieved using a lens with optical lens-based stabilization, either native EOS RF lenses with IS, or Canon EOS EF lenses (through the official Canon RF-EF Adapter) with IS.

=== Autofocus and metering ===
The camera's 143-point autofocus sensors uses Canon's Dual Pixel AF system to capture and record and offers 88% horizontal and 100% vertical frame coverage. The EOS RP has 4,779 manually selectable focusing points.

When recording in 4K Ultra HD resolution, focusing is restricted to contrast-detection autofocus instead of using the preferable Dual Pixel AF system, the former exhibiting undesirable focus hunting and is not as smooth as the Dual Pixel AF system that's available in HD modes.

=== ISO ===
The EOS RP's ISO is 100–40000 with expansion down to ISO 50 and up to ISO 51200 equivalent (H1) and ISO 102,400 equivalent (H2).

=== Shutter ===
The EOS RP's shutter speed range is 30 s to 1/4,000 s (bulb). The camera has an approximate maximum continuous shooting speed of 5.0 frames per second in High-Speed Continuous Shooting drive mode and a shooting speed of 4 frames per second in Shooting Speed Priority mode.

=== Ergonomics and functions ===
The EOS RP has a flip-around 7.5 cm (3 inch) TFT LCD screen with a resolution of 1,040,000 dots with touchscreen capabilities. The .99 cm (.39 inch) OLED electronic viewfinder has a resolution of 2,360,000 dots and a .70x magnification, a downgrade from the Canon EOS R which had a larger screen size by 1.25 cm (.50 inch) and resolution of 3,360,000 dots.

While the EOS RP body is similar to that of its predecessor, the Canon EOS R, it does not have the Touch Bar control or a secondary status LCD. The EOS RP body weighs 440 g (16 oz) while the camera body with battery and memory card weighs 485 g (17.1 oz). It is Canon's lightest and most compact full frame camera.

=== Video ===
The camera can record 4K (cropped) Ultra HD (3840 × 2160) at 23.98 frames per second with a noticeable APS-C sensor crop of about 1.7x. The camera additionally records Full HD (1920 × 1080) and Standard HD (1280 × 720) at 59.94, 29.97, and as of firmware update version 1.4, 1080p at 23.98 frames per second. Similar to many other DSLR cameras, the continuous recording time for the EOS RP is limited to 29 minutes and 59 seconds for all video resolutions.

== Lenses ==
The EOS RP is the second camera to use Canon's RF lens mount. It is possible to use older EF and EF-S lenses with one of the three available Canon EOS R mount adapters. With EF-S lenses the camera only functions as an APS-C camera and can only shoot 720p or 4K video without Dual Pixel AF. At launch of the RP, only four RF lenses were available, however as of January 2021 over 24 RF lenses are available.

== Reception ==
On launch, the EOS RP received mixed reviews from technology blogs due to the cropped video resolution and the limited number of RF lenses available at launch. Comparatively, photographers welcomed the camera's low price and its low weight for a full-frame mirrorless camera.

Technology blog Engadget summarized the EOS RP as a disappointment citing concerns with the camera's 4K resolution video being noticeably cropped and limited autofocus detection while recording. It also noted that two of the four RF lenses available at launch were "nearly twice as expensive as the camera itself". Digital Trends provided a mixed review by identifying "some purposefully truncated features" and corroborated on the EOS RP's video abilities by stating that "video feels like an afterthought". T3 Magazine concurred with the limited video functionality and like the EOS R, its insufficient FPS for fast sports shooting. However it claimed there was 'plenty to like about it' but 'a bit of a mixed bag' similar to the R model, also awarding it 4 stars. TechRadar awarded it 4 stars, concluding the RP has a 'capable feature set, a generally sound performance and a very reasonable asking price' mainly criticizing the lack of affordable lenses available.

Retrospective reviews have been more positive, noting the increasing number of RF lenses available and the low price of the camera. In October 2021, Digital Camera World awarded the camera 4 stars, concluding that the camera was "far from an entry level camera, but .. ideal an entry level full-frame camera." In a comparison of Canon's all then-available RF mount camera, Ken Rockwell expressed a particular affection for the RP despite its technical downsides, praising it for the "smallest size, lowest weight, direct controls and by far lowest price" of the camera line-up and concluding that the RP is "everything mirrorless was always supposed to be". In his standalone review of the camera, Ken Rockwell named it "[the] World's Best Practical Mirrorless Camera".

== See also ==
- Canon EOS
- List of lightest mirrorless cameras

| Sensor | Class | 12 | 13 | 14 | 15 | 16 | 17 | 18 | 19 | 20 | 21 | 22 | 23 | 24 | 25 | 26 |
|---|---|---|---|---|---|---|---|---|---|---|---|---|---|---|---|---|
| Full-frame | Flagship | | | | | | | | | | | | | | _{m} R1 ^{ATS} | |
| Full-frame | Professional | | | | | | | | | | | _{m} R3 ^{ATS} | | | | |
| Full-frame | Professional | | | | | | | | | | R5 ^{ATSR} | | | | _{m} R5 Mk II ^{ATSR} | |
| Full-frame | Professional | | | | | | | | | | | _{m} R5 C ^{ATCR} | | | | |
| Full-frame | Advanced | | | | | | | | | | R6 ^{ATS} | | _{m} R6 Mk II ^{ATS} | | | _{m} R6 Mk III ^{ATS} |
| Full-frame | Advanced | | | | | | | | | | | | | | | R6 V ^{ATS} |
| Full-frame | Advanced | | | | | | | | | Ra ^{AT} | | | | | | |
| Full-frame | Advanced | | | | | | | | R ^{AT} | | | | | | | |
| Full-frame | Midrange | | | | | | | | | | | | | _{m} R8 ^{AT} | | |
| Full-frame | Entry/mid | | | | | | | | RP ^{AT} | | | | | | | |
| APS-C | Advanced | | | | | | | | | | | | _{m} R7 ^{ATS} | | | |
| APS-C | Midrange | | | | | | M5 ^{FT} | | | | | | _{m} R10 ^{AT} | | | |
| APS-C | Entry/mid | | _{x} M ^{T} | M2 ^{T} | M3 ^{FT} | | | M6 ^{FT} | | M6 Mk II ^{FT} | | | | | | |
| APS-C | Entry/mid | | | | | | | | M50 ^{AT} | | M50 Mk II ^{AT} | | | _{m} R50 ^{AT} | | |
| APS-C | Entry/mid | | | | | | | | | | | | | | | _{m} R50 V ^{AT} |
| APS-C | Entry | | | | | M10 ^{FT} | | M100 ^{FT} | | M200 ^{FT} | | | | R100 | | |
| Sensor | Class | | | | | | | | | | | | | | | |
| Sensor | Class | 12 | 13 | 14 | 15 | 16 | 17 | 18 | 19 | 20 | 21 | 22 | 23 | 24 | 25 | 26 |
