= Canon EOS 100 =

1991 35mm single-lens reflex camera

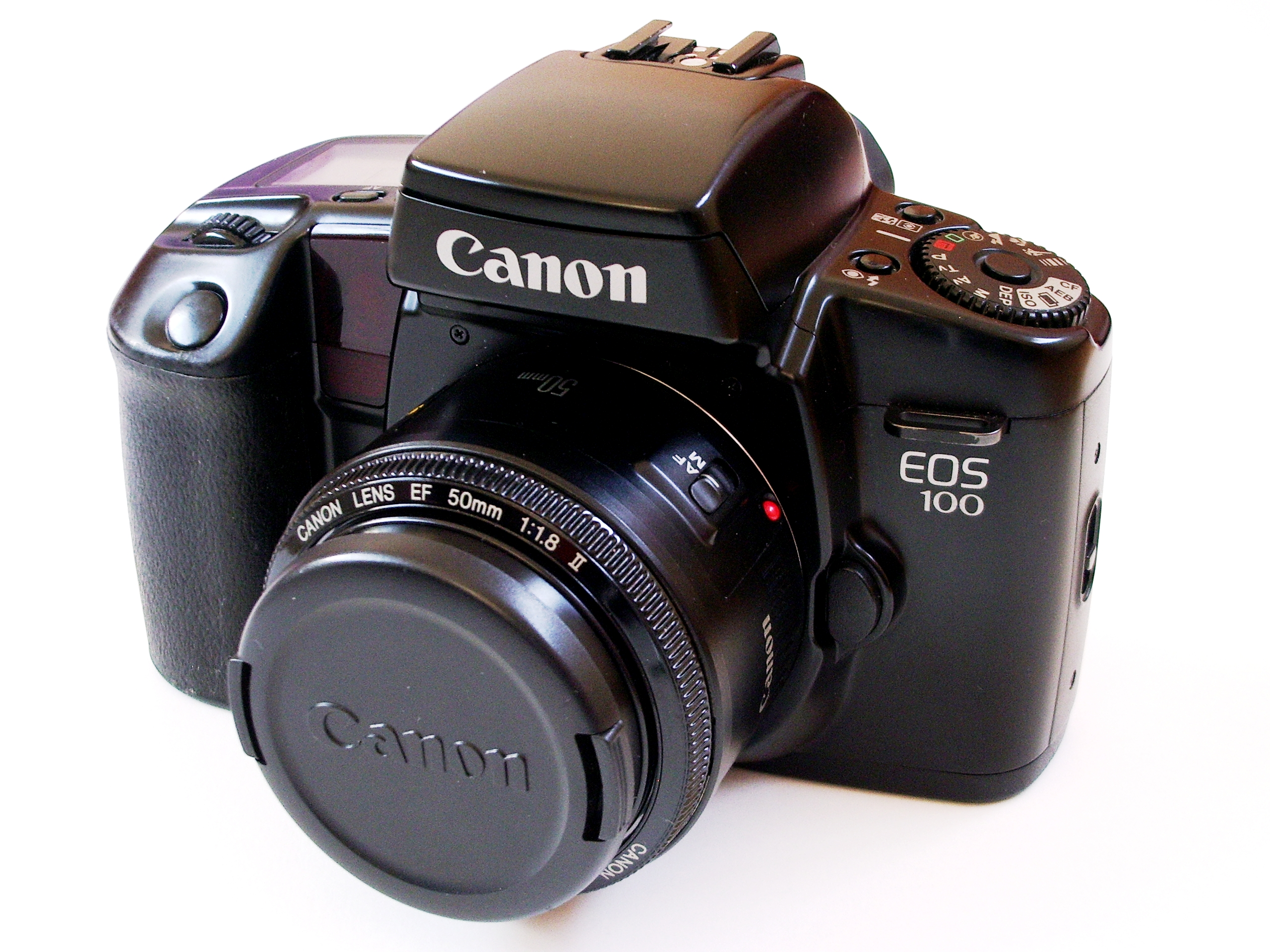

Overview
- Type: Single-lens reflex
- Released: July 1991; 34 years ago
- Intro price: ¥76,000 (body only); ¥118,000 (with EF 28-80mm f/3.5-5.6 USM)

Lens
- Lens mount: Canon EF
- Lens: Interchangeable

Sensor/medium
- Film format: 135 film
- Film size: 36 × 24 mm
- Film speed: ISO 6 – 6400

Focusing
- Focus: TTL Phase Detection Autofocus (1 zone)

Exposure/metering
- Exposure: Programmed, shutter priority, aperture priority, manual, depth-of-field AE. Metering: 6-zone evaluative, centre weighted, partial

Shutter
- Frame rate: 3 frame/s
- Shutter speed range: 30s – 1/4000s

Viewfinder
- Viewfinder: Fixed eye-level pentaprism
- Viewfinder magnification: 0.75×
- Frame coverage: 90%

General
- Battery: 2CR5
- Dimensions: 154×105×69 mm (6.1×4.1×2.7 in)
- Weight: 580 g (20 oz) (body only)

Chronology
- Replaced: Canon EOS 650
- Replaced by: Canon EOS 50

The Canon EOS 100 is a 35 mm autofocus SLR camera introduced by Canon in 1991. It was marketed as the EOS Elan in North America. It was the second camera in the EOS range to be targeted at advanced amateur photographers, replacing the EOS 650.

Its headline features were near-silent film winding, input of EOS barcode programs, integral auto-zoom flash, twin input dials, an autofocus auxiliary light for low-contrast subjects, a maximum shutter speed of 1/4000s, and five fully automatic modes.

== Design ==
EOS 100 viewfinder information

The look and feel of the EOS 100 had much in common with the T90 and EOS 650. It was based around a polycarbonate body with metal bayonet lens mount.

The top left of the body had a Command Dial for choice of either Creative or Image zones and buttons to control the integral flash. The top right of the body had a multi-function Main Dial, buttons for autofocus and film advance control, the shutter release button and an LCD panel. The back of the body had the Quick Control Dial, used for aperture control, and the AE Lock Button, used to lock exposure settings.

Once the Command Dial had been set for a particular shooting style, all controls could be accessed with the right hand, with the viewfinder feeding back information to the photographer.

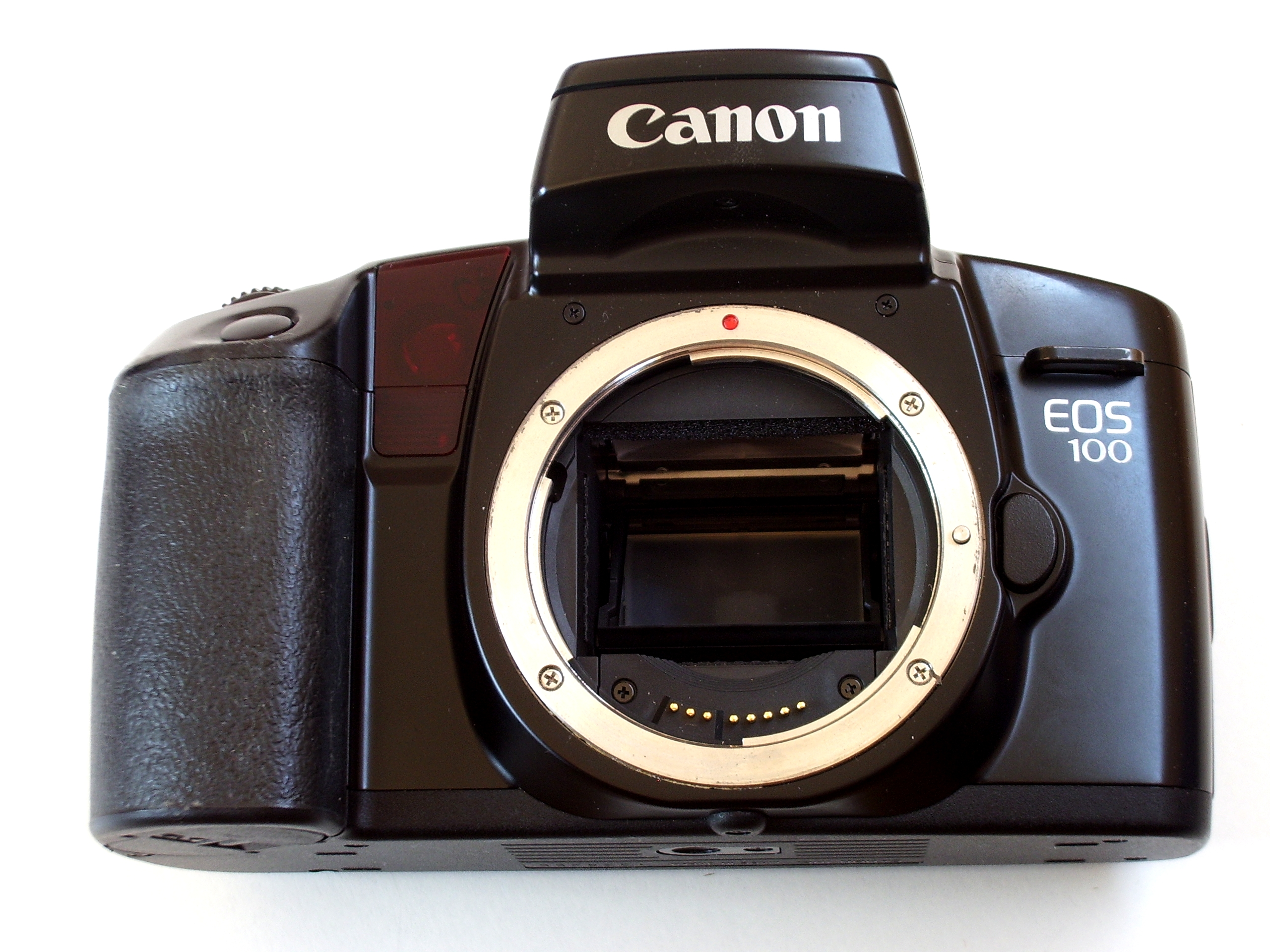
Metal bayonet lens mount

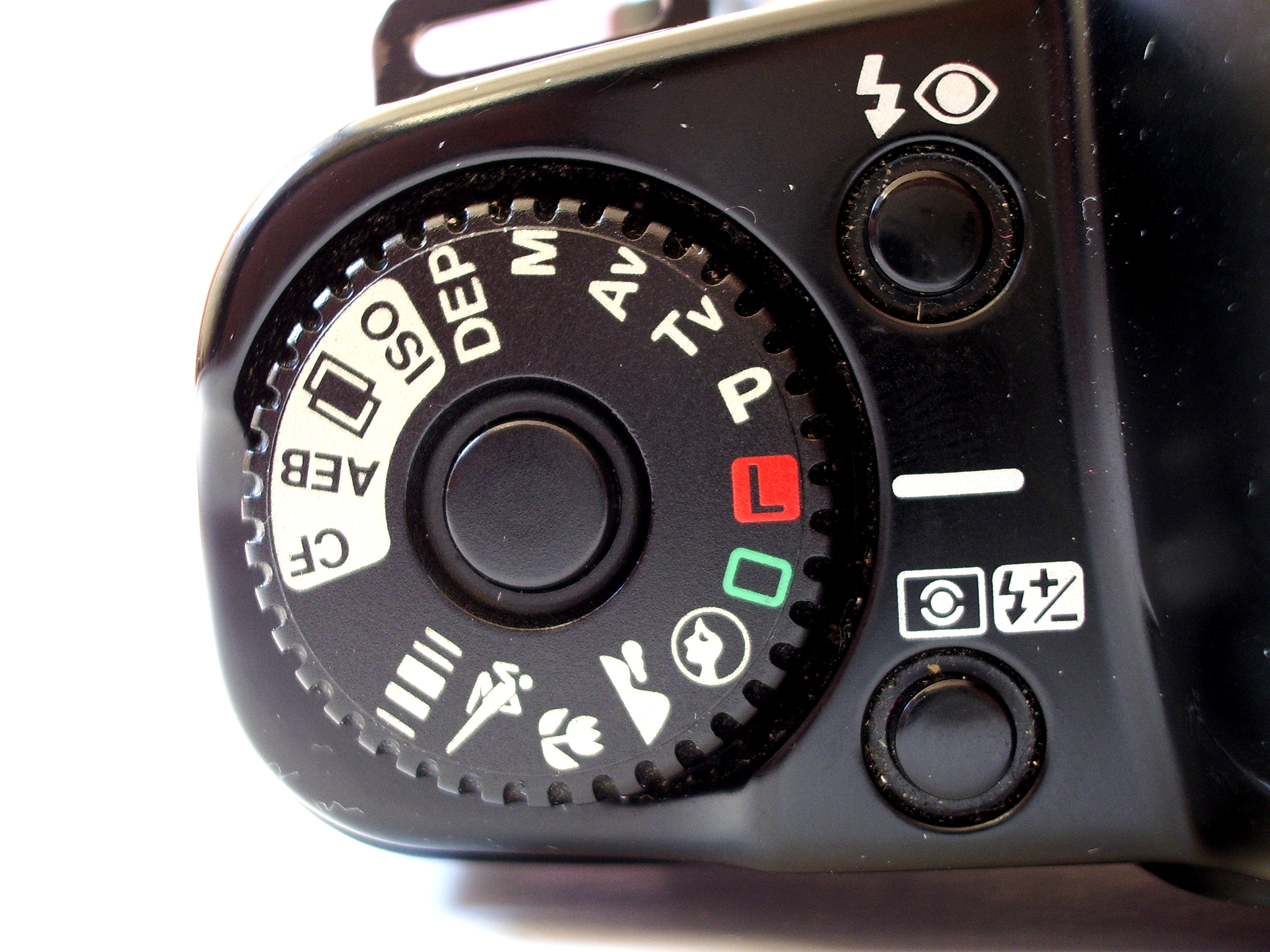
Command dial

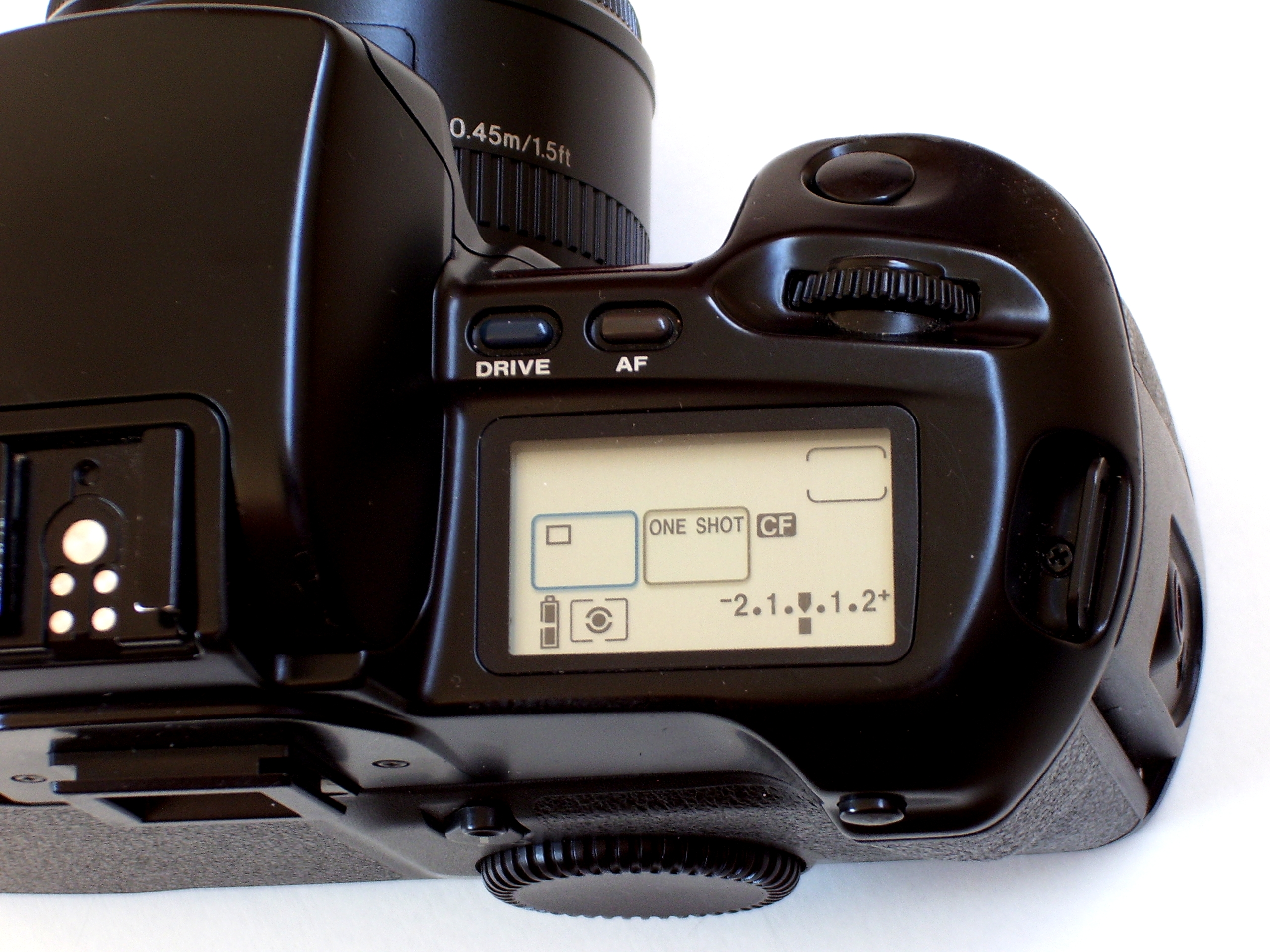
LCD

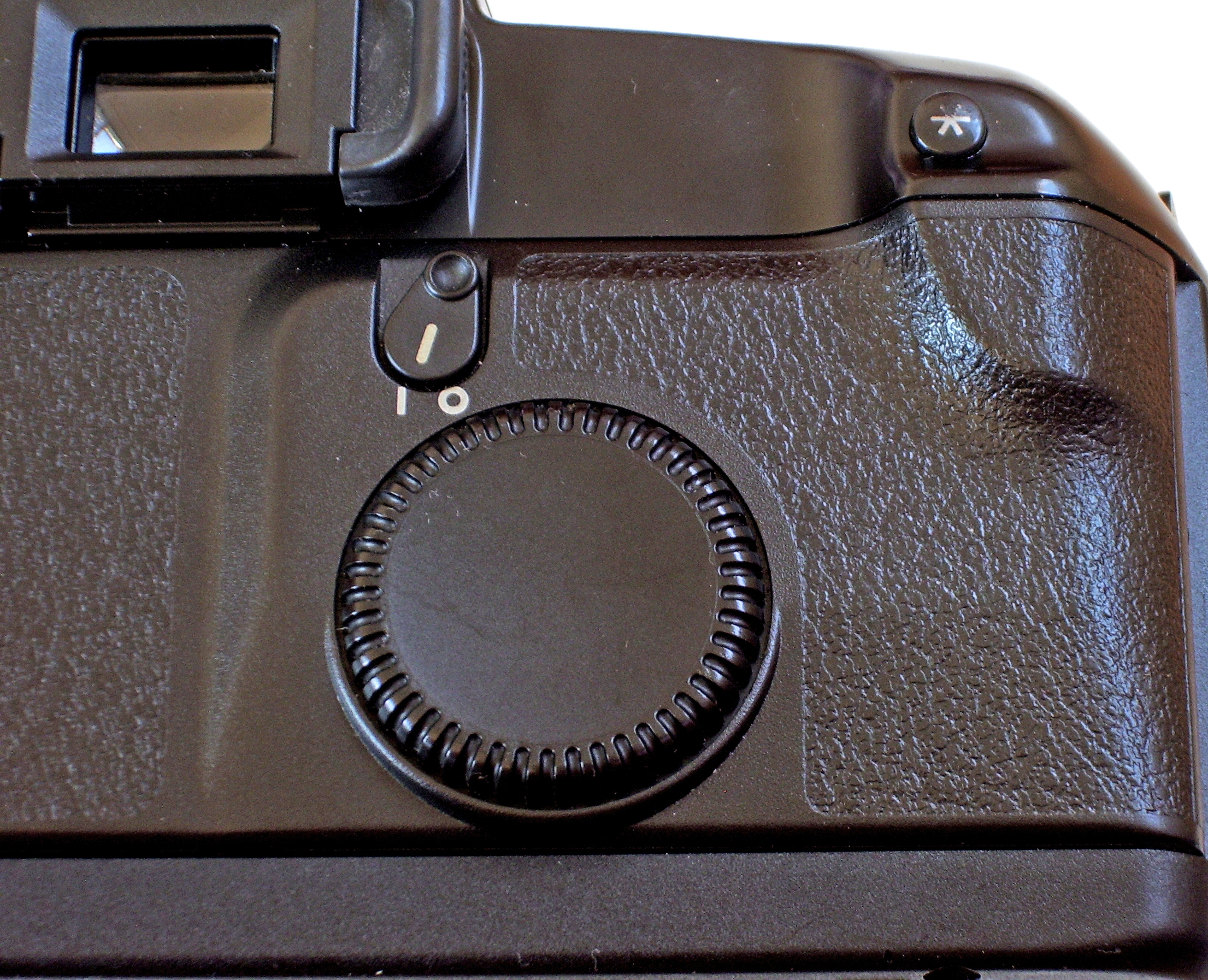
Quick Control Dial and AE Lock Button

== Power features ==
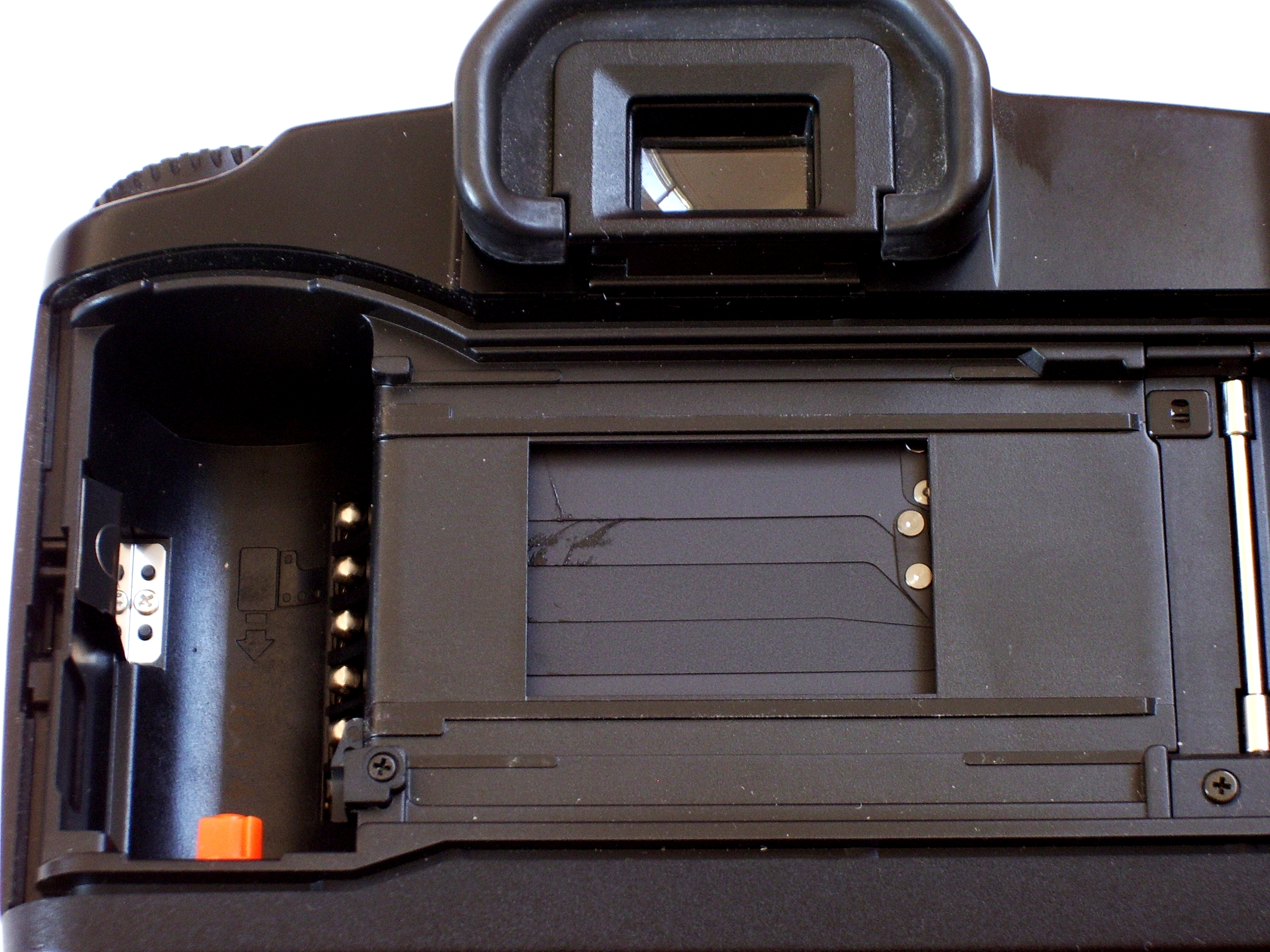
As seen in this picture, there is oil on the shutter blades due to the foam bumper disintegrating. This will affect shutter speeds and will effectively render the camera useless.

The EOS 100 came with a motorised belt drive for film winding and rewinding. Canon claimed this made it the quietest camera in the EOS range.

The drive also enabled the camera to operate at three frames per second, faster than most of its competitors.

Using the Drive Button, the photographer could choose whether to allow single or multiple photographs to be taken as the shutter release button was held.

The drive could also be disabled to allow up to nine multiple exposures to be made.

All powered functions in the EOS 100 came from a single 6 volt lithium 2CR5. There was no option to adapt this to AA size batteries.

== Focusing ==
The EOS 100 had a single BASIS (BAse Stored Image Sensor) chip, targeting the centre of the viewfinder. This was key to its two autofocussing (AF) modes: One-shot AF and AI Servo AF.

One-shot AF was used for stationary objects. Once in focus, exposure was calculated then the shutter was released. In low light or low contrast situations, the AF auxiliary light would momentarily project a series of red bands on the subject. This then enabled the AF circuits to have a subject with contrast they could focus onto.

AI Servo AF was used for moving objects. The lens would continuously refocus on the object in the centre of the viewfinder whilst the shutter release button was pressed half-way. Once the shutter release button was fully pressed, the exposure was calculated then the shutter released.

Depth of field preview could be enabled via a custom function. If enabled, the aperture would reduce to show the depth of field every time the AE Lock Button was pressed.

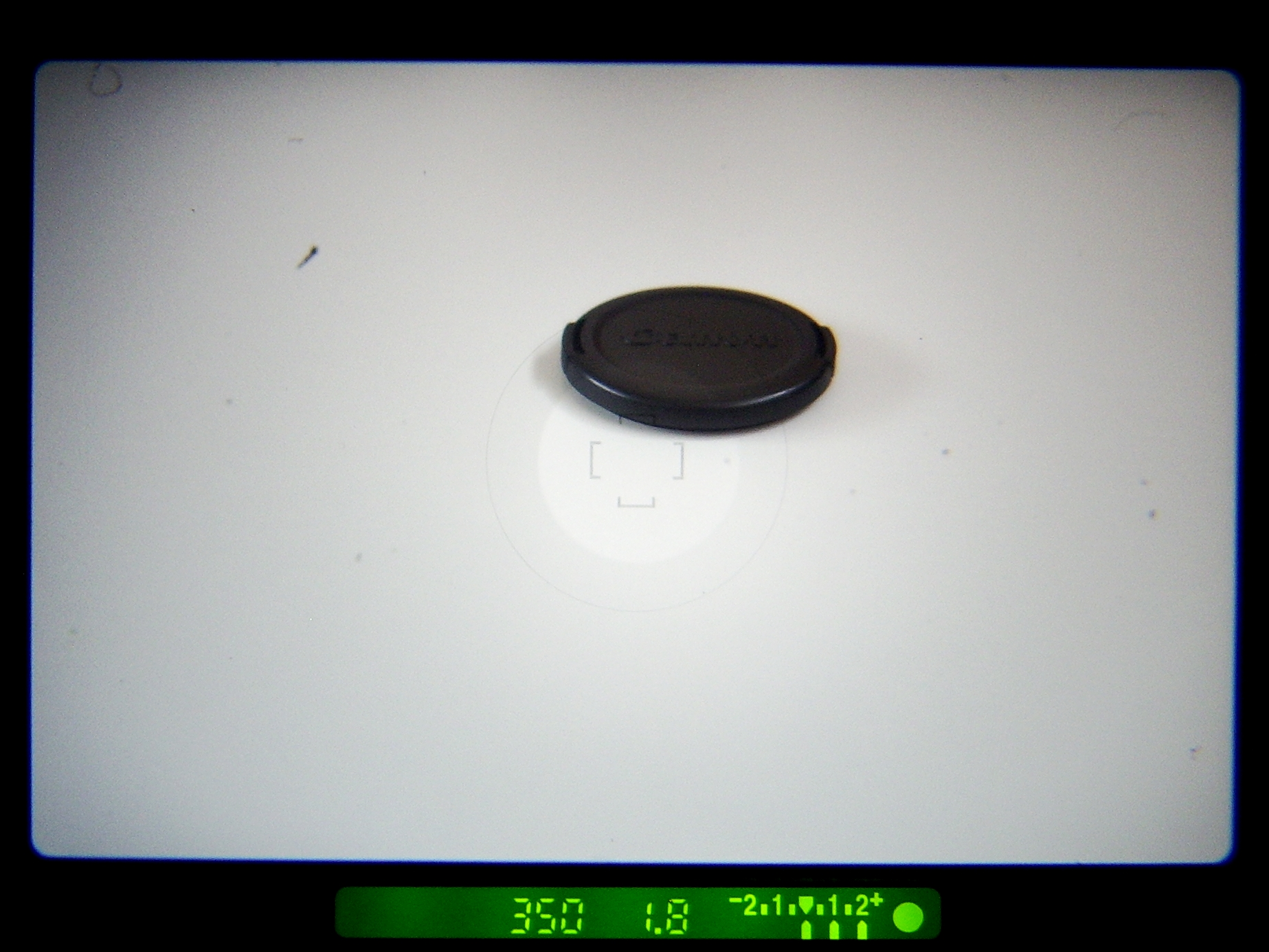
View presented to the photographer

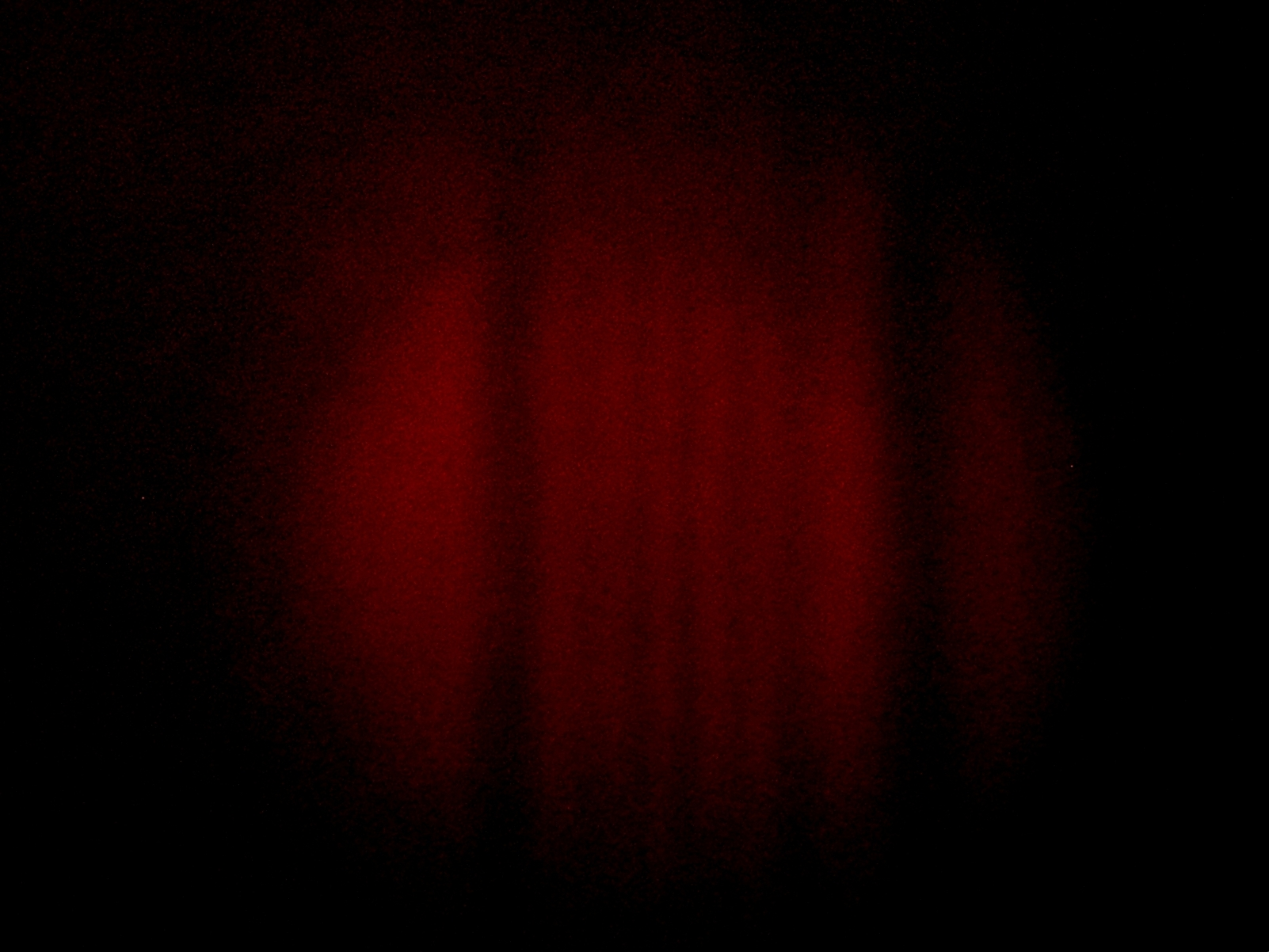
Auxiliary light – bands of red light shone onto subject to give contrast for autofocus circuits to operate

== Exposure control ==
Light metering consisted of full-aperture through-the-lens metering, using a six zone silicon photocell. Automatic exposure settings were calculated using three metering modes: partial metering (central 6.5% of the picture), centre-weighted average metering and evaluative metering. The current metering mode was displayed on the LCD panel.

The Command Dial gave the photographer the choice of several shooting modes. The operation, and even the symbology used, would eventually be incorporated into Canon's digital camera range. Canon's fully automatic Programmed Image Control modes were Full Auto, Portrait, Landscape, Close-up and Sports.

Symbol					
Description	Full Auto	Portrait	Landscape	Close-up	Sports

The manually adjustable shooting modes were Shutter-priority, Aperture-priority and Depth-of-field. In these modes, the exposure could be compensated by ±2 stops in 1/2-stop increments. Also, AEB (auto exposure bracketing) could be used to take three continuous exposures in sequence, again by ±2 stops in 1/2-stop increments.

All exposure control settings would be ignored when the Command Dial was set to manual. Then, both shutter speed and aperture could be set independently. The viewfinder would still give information on whether the camera thought the shot would be under- or over-exposed, but it wouldn't interfere.

== Flash ==
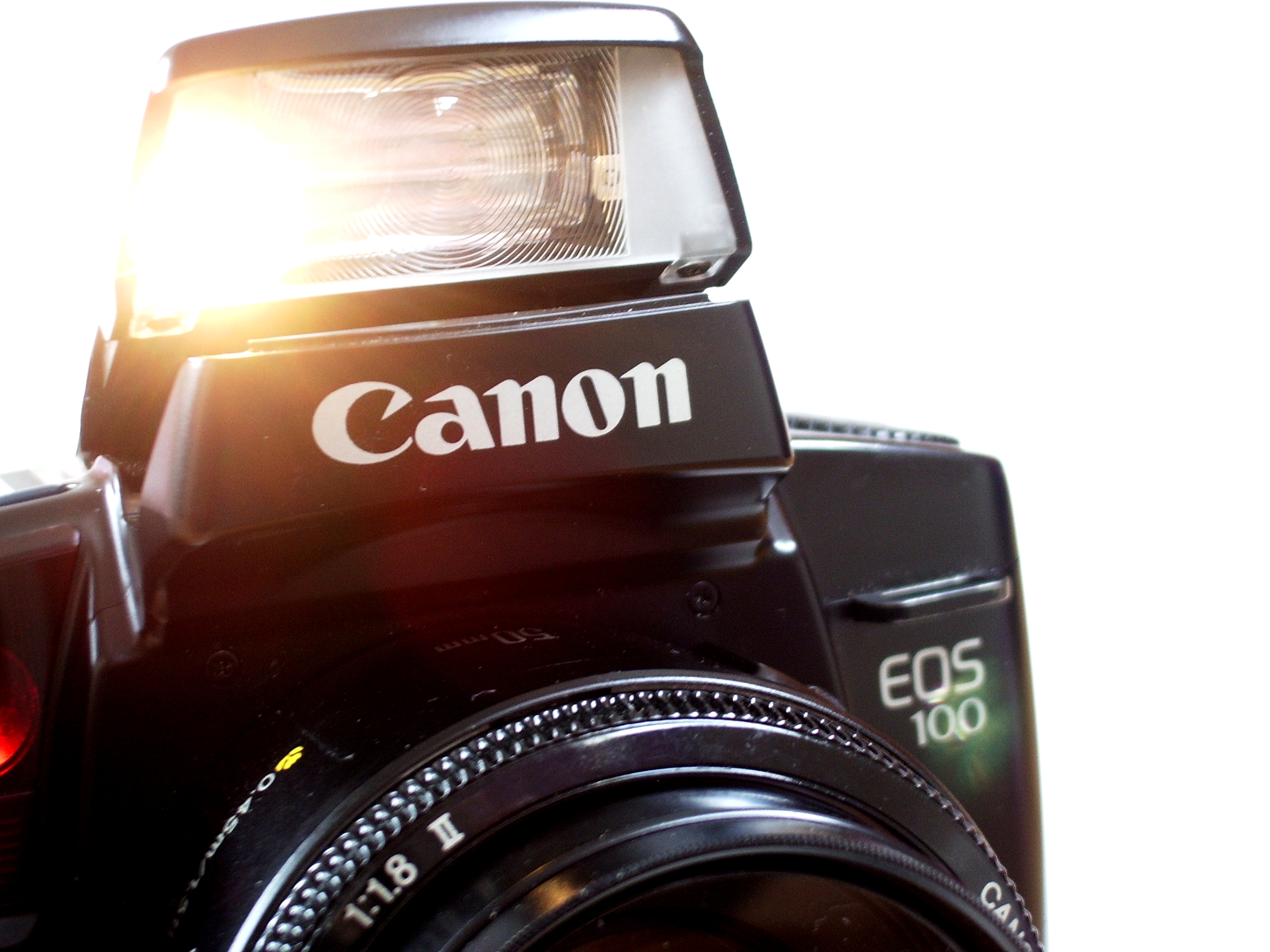
Red-eye reduction was achieved via a bright light, not a series of pre-flashes

The EOS 100 had an integrated retractable TTL flash. Information via the EF lens mount was used to optimise the zoom setting of the flash. It had three zooms to cover the focal lengths of 28 mm, 50 mm and 80 mm. Consequently, its guide number for ISO 100 varied between 12 m at 28 mm, to 18 m at 80 mm.

The focal plane shutter gave an X-sync speed of 1/125 second. The flash would normally fire when the first curtain had finished its travel, but this could be changed to the second curtain via a custom function.

Red-eye reduction was achieved by producing a piercing continuous bright light to the left of the flash. This would shine while the flash capacitors were charged.

The flash shoe contained signals for X-sync, red-eye reduction and second curtain sync.

== Accessories ==
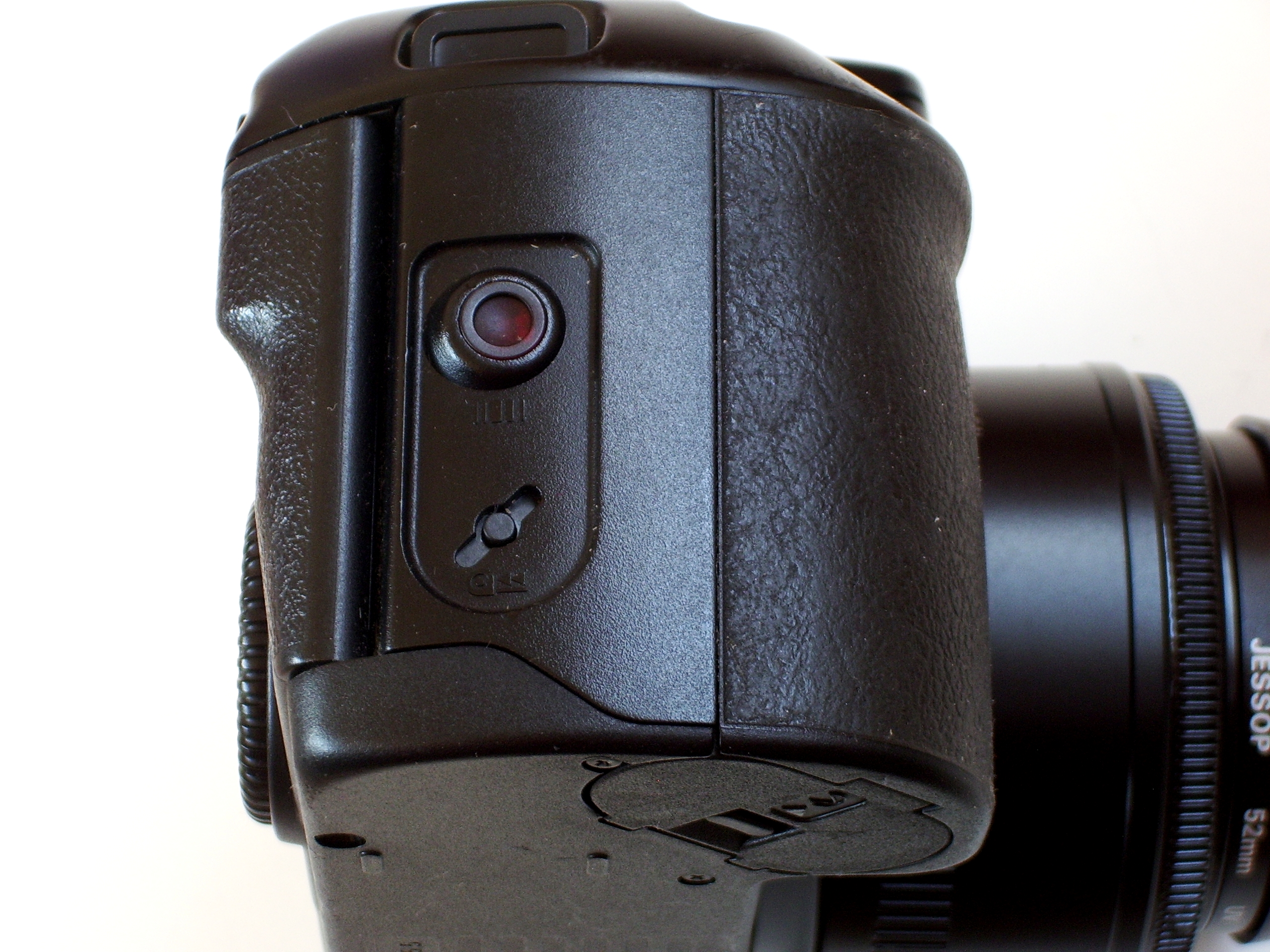
Circular infrared connection point for Canon's Barcode Reader

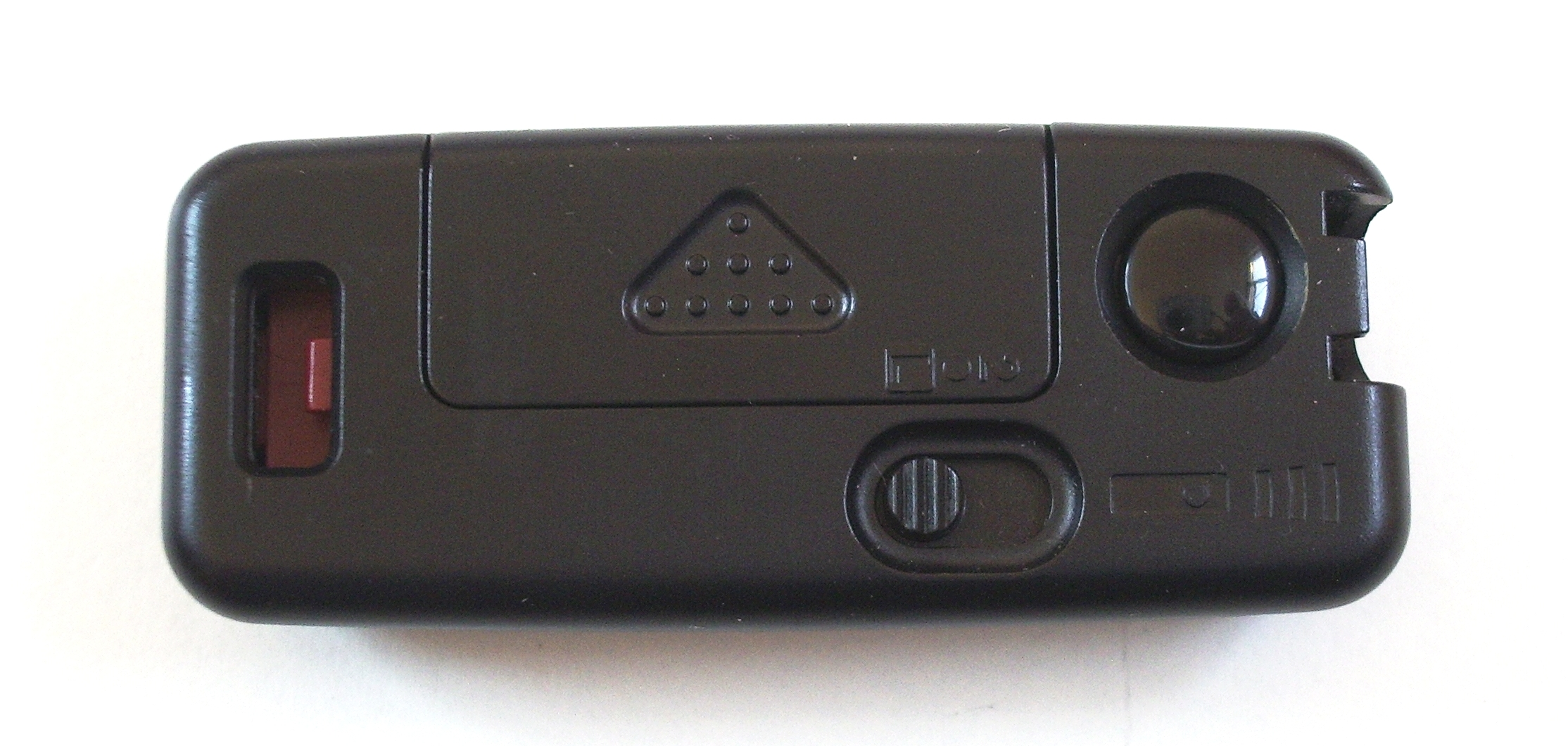
RC-1 infrared remote control unit

The only accessory specific to the EOS 100 made by Canon was the GR-70 grip extension. However, unlike other grip extensions, this provides neither further power solutions (e.g. via AA batteries), nor extra shutter release buttons (e.g. for shooting in vertical, portrait orientation).

The EOS 100 had a feature it shared with just one other camera (the EOS 10) in the EOS range; the barcode reader. With the Command Dial turned to the barcode setting, the camera would accept programming details from Canon's Barcode Reader. Canon published a book of approximately 100 photographs showing different styles of pictures (landscapes, night-time shots, fast moving action, etc.). Below each was a barcode which could be scanned by the reader. This reader was then placed against the camera's infrared connection point and the settings were transferred.

The back could not be exchanged, e.g. for date/time stamping. For this functionality, Canon released the EOS 100QD, where QD stood for Quartz Date. Contrary to Canon's own publications, this was marketed worldwide, not just in Japan.

Despite not having many specific accessories, the EOS 100 was built to accept all of Canon's EOS range of accessories:

- all EF lenses
- Speedlite 430EZ flash (guide number 43 m)
- Speedlite 300EZ flash (guide number 28 m)
- ML-3 ring flash
- RC-1 infrared remote control unit
- Dioptric adjustment lenses for the viewfinder eye piece

== Custom functions ==
The EOS 100 was among the first of Canon's cameras to have the facility to alter its operation via custom functions. These would remain set even if the camera was switched off or the battery replaced.

Custom Function	Description
CF1	1=Stop film rewind at end of spool. Useful at quiet social events – film is rewound by pressing the film rewind button.
CF2	1=Second shutter flash sync. Gives more natural speed blurring.
CF3	1=Ignore DX film coding. Used if the photographer decides to up/down-rate a whole spool.
CF4	1=Switch off AF auxiliary light. Used if the auxiliary light could distract the subject.
CF5	1=Enable depth of field preview. Pressing the exposure lock button also sets the aperture so depth-of-field can be seen through the viewfinder.
CF6	1=Turn all warning bleeps off. Makes the camera even quieter.
CF7	1=Mirror up at start of countdown timer. Used to minimise all possibility of camera shake.

== Use today ==
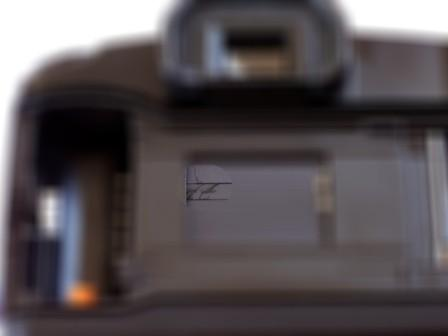
Sticky shutter problem highlighted

The EOS 100 never enjoyed the popularity of the lower-pitched EOS 1000 and it was discontinued in 1995.

As of 2008, EOS 100 bodies can be bought from on-line auction sites from as little as £10/$15.

Along with the T90, and other older Canon SLR film cameras, used EOS 100s can suffer from a 'sticky shutter' problem. This is caused by the camera's internal light sealing foam, which degrades over time and becomes stuck to the shutter, affecting exposures. This can affect the camera's resale value. The command dial is also prone to detachment from the electronic part of the dial, and many used EOS 100s are rendered unusable from this manufacturing flaw.

Class	1987	1988	1989	1990	1991	1992	1993	1994	1995	1996	1997	1998	1999	2000	2001	2002	2003	2004	2005	2006	2007	…	2018
Professional				1					1N					1V									
Professional				RT					1N RS														
High-end				10			5						3										
Advanced		620		600		100				50					30				30V				
Midrange	650				1000F	1000F N		500			500N			300			300V		300X				
Entry-level		750	850	700					5000				3000			3000N		3000V					
Entry-level											IX												
Entry-level												IX 7											
