= E7 =

E7, E07, E-7 or E_{7} may refer to:

== Science and engineering ==
- E7 liquid crystal mixture
- E_{7} (mathematics), an exceptional Lie group, or its Lie algebra $\mathfrak e_7$
- E_{7} polytope, in geometry
- E7 papillomavirus protein
- E7 European long distance path

== Transport ==
- EMD E7, a diesel locomotive
- European route E07, an international road
- Peugeot E7, a hackney cab
- PRR E7, a steam locomotive
- Carbon Motors E7, a police car
- E7 series, a Japanese high-speed train
- Nihonkai-Tōhoku Expressway and Akita Expressway (between Kawabe JCT and Kosaka JCT), route E7 in Japan
- Cheras–Kajang Expressway, route E7 in Malaysia
- Foton Smart Smurf E7, a Chinese battery electric van

== Other uses ==
- Boeing E-7, either:
  - Boeing E-7 ARIA, the original designation assigned by the United States Air Force under the Mission Designation System to the EC-18B Advanced Range Instrumentation Aircraft.
  - Boeing E-7 Wedgetail, the designation assigned by the Royal Australian Air Force to the Boeing 737 AEW&C (airborne early warning and control) aircraft.
- Economy 7, an electricity tariff
- E-7 enlisted rank in the military of the United States
- E7, a musical note in the seventh octave
- E-7, the original designation for the EC-18 ARIA electronic warfare aircraft
- E7, a postcode district in the E postcode area for east London
- European Aviation Air Charter, by IATA airline designator
- Nokia E7, a smart phone
- Samsung Galaxy E7, a smart phone
- E07, a number station allegedly used by Russia, and nicknamed "The English Man"
- Eureka Seven

== See also ==
- 7E (disambiguation)
