= 7E =

7E or 7-E can refer to:

- 7th meridian east
- A-7E, a model of LTV A-7 Corsair II
- South African Class 7E, a locomotive
- 7E, a Long Island bus; see List of bus routes in Suffolk County, New York
- MD 7E, a section of Maryland Route 7
- Windows 7 E, one of the Windows 7 editions
- AIM-7E Sparrow, a model of AIM-7 Sparrow
- Nebraska Link 7E; see List of Nebraska Connecting Link, Spur, and Recreation Highways
- SSH 7E (WA), now called Washington State Route 171
- General Electric 7E; see General Electric YJ93
- 7e, meaning 7th in French
  - Paris 7e (or 7e arrondissement), the 7th arrondissement of Paris
- EOS Elan 7/7e; see Canon EOS 30
- 7E, the production code for the 1987 Doctor Who serial Paradise Towers
- 7-Eleven, an international chain of convenience stores

== See also ==
- E7 (disambiguation)
