= Canon EOS 50 =

1995 35mm single-lens reflex camera

Canon EOS 50 / 50E / 55 Canon EOS Elan II / Elan IIE
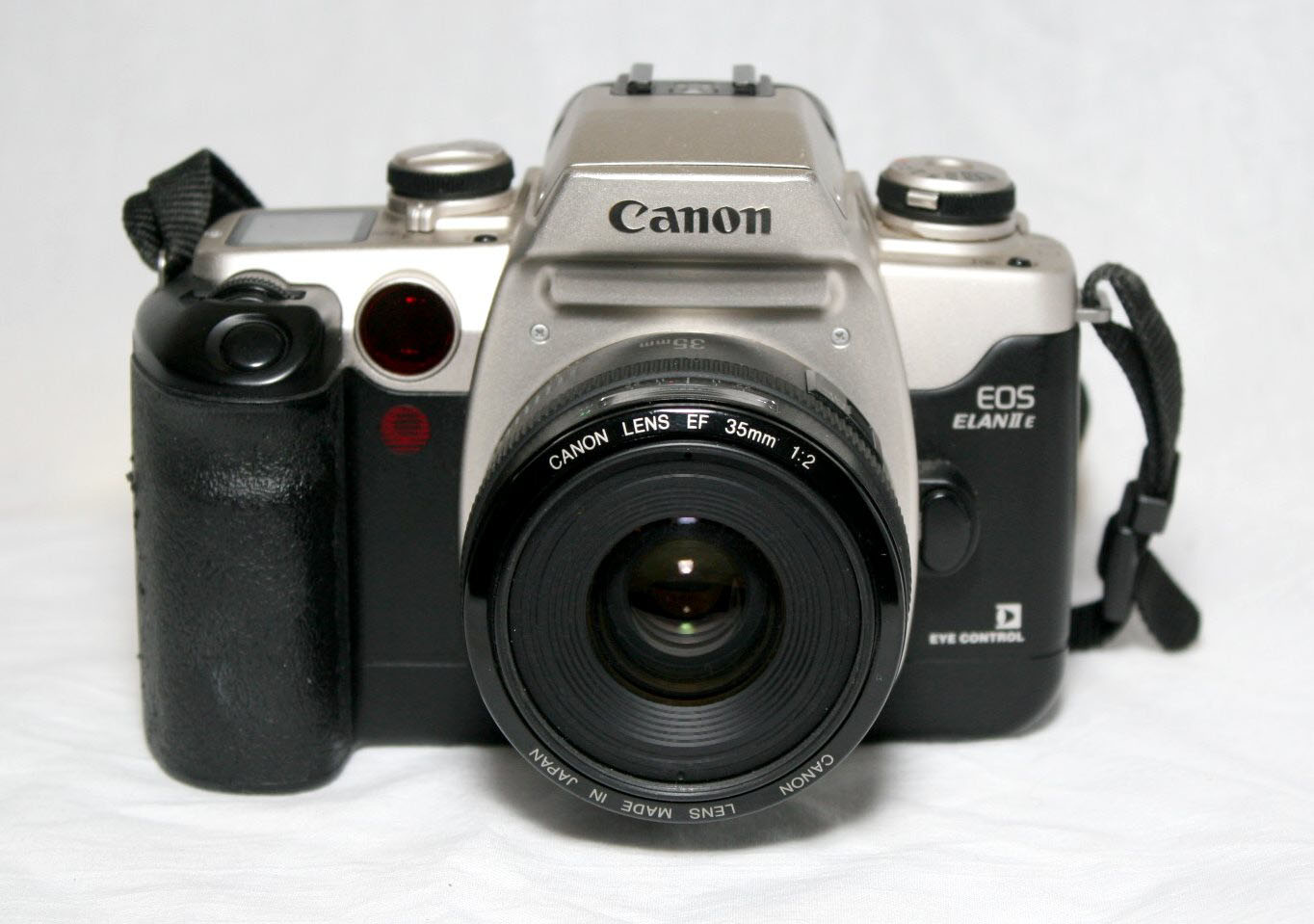
- Canon EOS Elan IIe equipped with EF 35mm f/2 lens

Overview
- Maker: Canon
- Type: SLR
- Production: September 1995 – 2000
- Intro price: ¥88,000 (body only); ¥140,000 (with EF 28-105mm f/3.5-4.5 USM)

Lens
- Lens mount: Canon EF
- Lens: Interchangeable

Sensor/medium
- Film format: 135 film
- Film size: 36×24 mm
- Film speed: ISO 6 – 6400
- Film speed detection: Yes (ISO 25 – 5000)

Focusing
- Focus: TTL Phase Detection Autofocus (3 zone)

Exposure/metering
- Exposure: PASM autoexposure 6 zone evaluative metering

Flash
- Flash: Built-in
- Flash synchronization: 1/125s

Shutter
- Frame rate: Up to 2.5 frame/s
- Shutter: Vertical-travel focal-plane
- Shutter speed range: 30s – 1/4000s

Viewfinder
- Viewfinder: Fixed eye-level pentaprism
- Viewfinder magnification: 0.71×
- Frame coverage: 83%

General
- Battery: 2CR5
- Dimensions: 153×105×71 mm (6.0×4.1×2.8 in)
- Weight: 595 g (21 oz)

Chronology
- Replaced: Canon EOS 100
- Replaced by: Canon EOS 30 / 33 / 7 / Elan 7 / Elan 7e

References
- "EOS ELAN II / EOS ELAN IIE". Canon Camera Museum.

The Canon EOS 50 (also known as the Elan II in America and the EOS 55 in Japan) is an autofocus, autoexposure 35mm SLR camera by Canon Inc. It was aimed at the advanced amateur market, and featured a rear command dial, support for custom functions, and an optional BP-50 battery pack with a dedicated portrait shutter release. The body was constructed of plastic, with the lens mount and top deck enclosed in an aluminium cover.

== Description ==
Three variants of the camera were produced, each of which was available with a quartz date imprint back. The basic model was the EOS 50. The EOS 50E variant introduced an enhanced version of the 3-zone eye-controlled autofocus system that was first seen on the EOS 5. The Japan-only EOS 55 was also available in an all-black version – rather than only the standard black and silver colour scheme – and included a panorama option. Sliding the button at the bottom of the rear of the camera causes panels to mask off all of the negative except for a 13 mm x 36mm strip in the middle.

The camera was powered by one 2CR5 battery. The optional BP-50 battery pack featured a portrait shutter release and the option to use four AA batteries.

The EOS 50 was also the first camera to implement Canon's E-TTL flash system. Canon's previous TTL system metered light reflected from the film onto a sensor during the actual exposure. E-TTL on the other hand fires a low-intensity pre-flash before exposure, and meters the reflected light through the camera's normal metering system.

Sales of the EOS 50 began in September 1995, and ended after the introduction of the replacement model, the EOS 30 in October 2000.

== Gallery ==
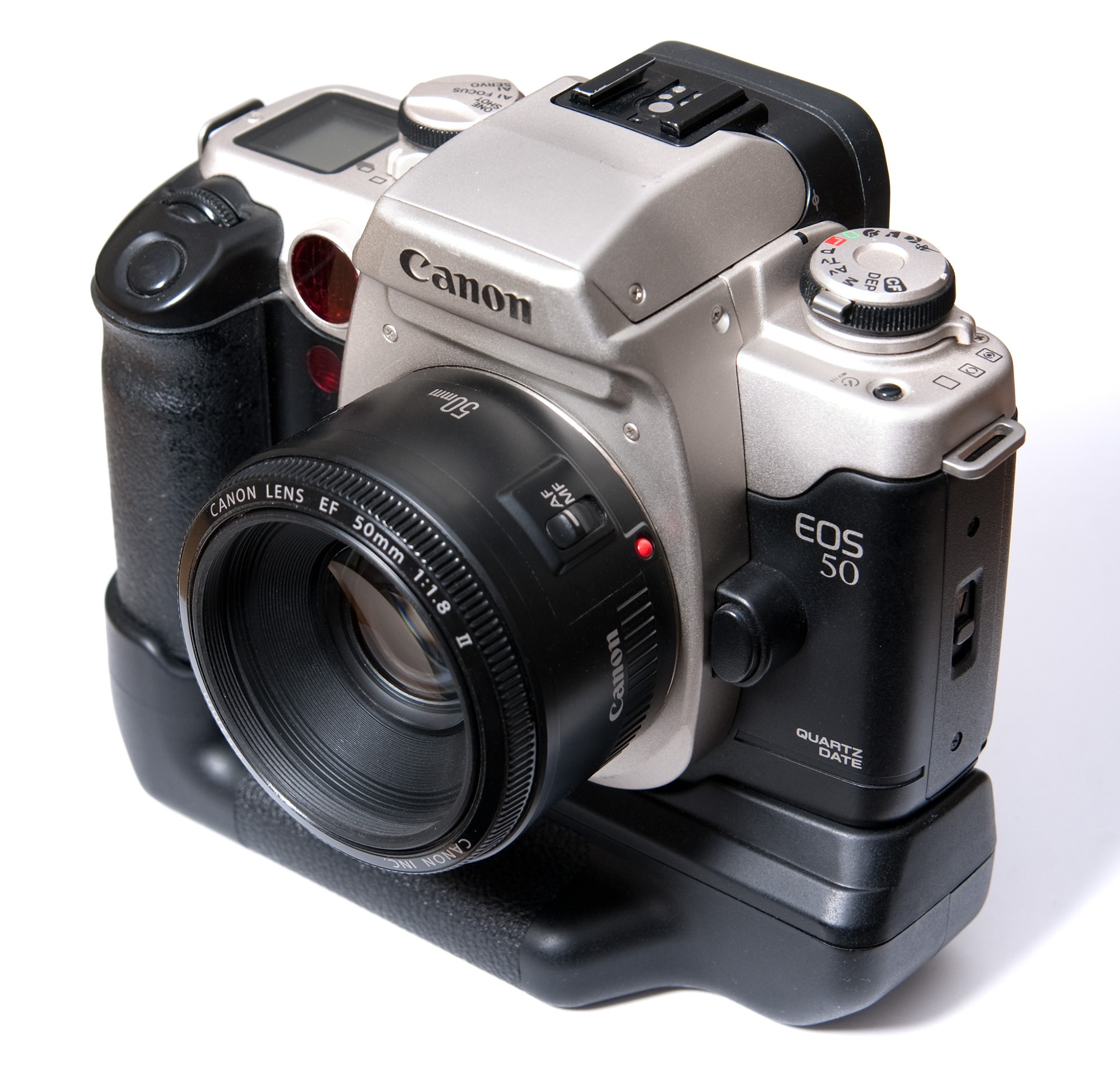
Canon EOS 50 QD with EF50mm f/1.8 II and BP-50 battery pack

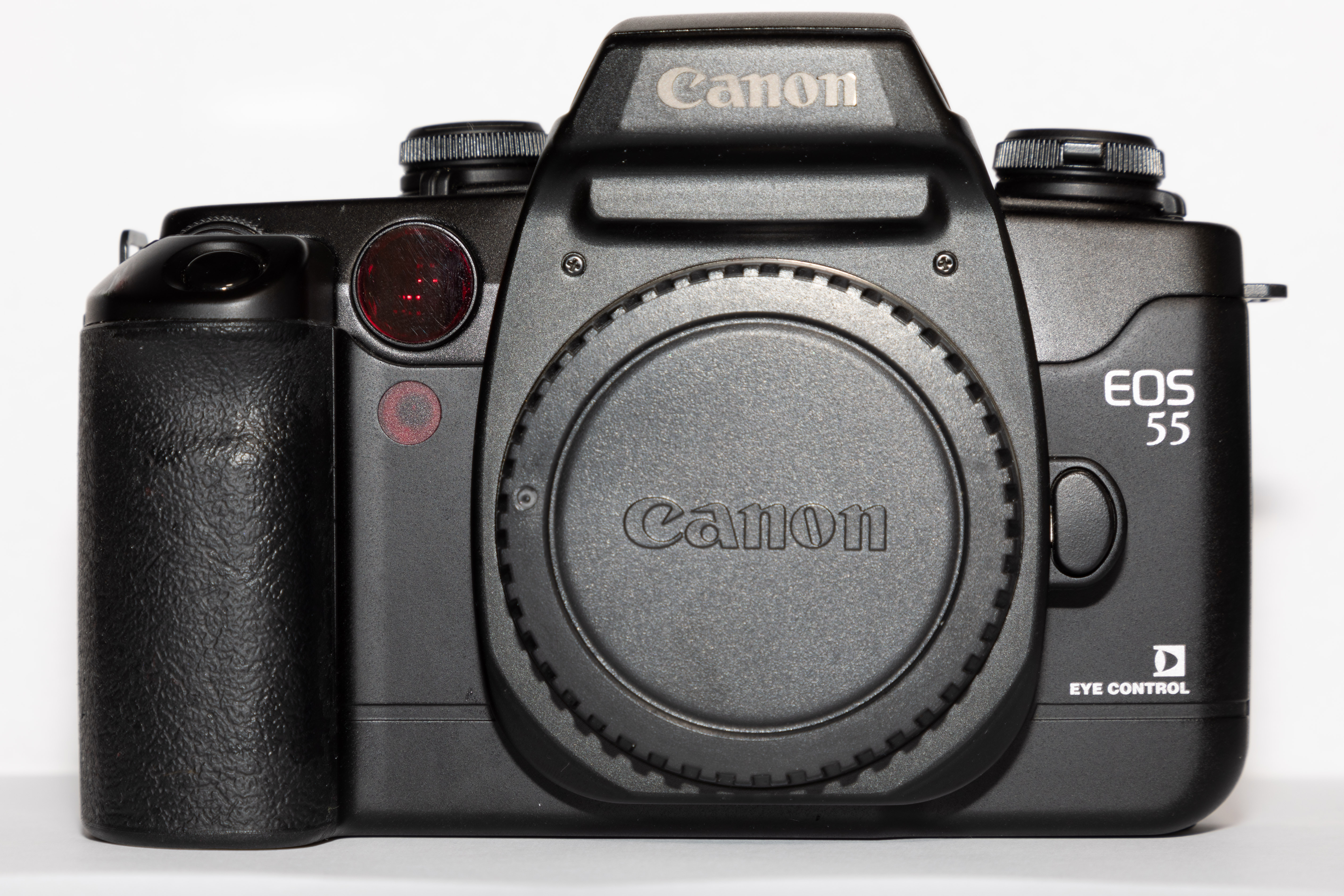
Canon EOS 55 Black (front view)

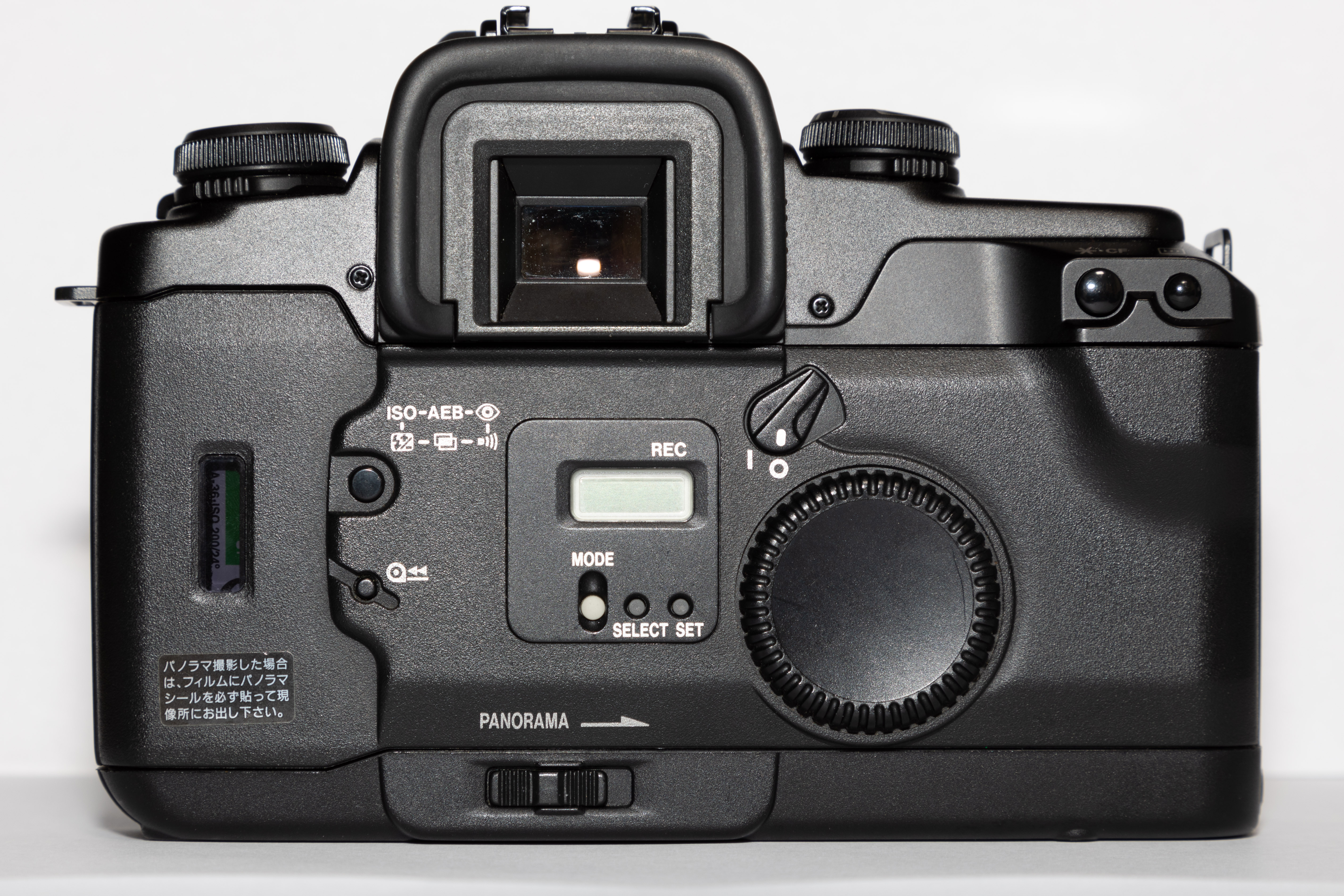
Canon EOS 55 Black (rear view)

Class	1987	1988	1989	1990	1991	1992	1993	1994	1995	1996	1997	1998	1999	2000	2001	2002	2003	2004	2005	2006	2007	…	2018
Professional				1					1N					1V									
Professional				RT					1N RS														
High-end				10			5						3										
Advanced		620		600		100				50					30				30V				
Midrange	650				1000F	1000F N		500			500N			300			300V		300X				
Entry-level		750	850	700					5000				3000			3000N		3000V					
Entry-level											IX												
Entry-level												IX 7											
