= Canon EF-M =

Canon EF-M may refer to:

- Canon EF-M camera, manual-focus 35mm film, SLR camera by Canon (introduced in 1991)
- Canon EF-M lens mount, lens mount for Canon EOS M Mirrorless interchangeable-lens camera system (introduced in 2012)
