= Canon EOS 30V =

2004 35mm single-lens reflex camera

Canon EOS 30V/33V [ELAN 7NE/7N]
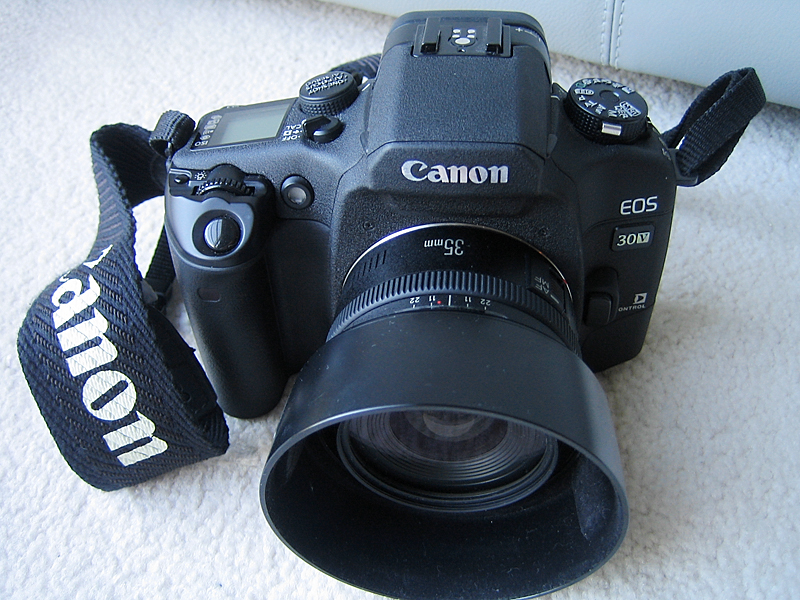

Overview
- Maker: Canon
- Type: 35mm SLR
- Released: 2004
- Production: 2004-2007

Lens
- Lens mount: Canon EF lens mount

Sensor/medium
- Sensor type: Film

Focusing
- Focus: TTL Phase Detection Autofocus (7 zone)

Exposure/metering
- Exposure: PASM autoexposure 35 zone evaluative metering

Flash
- Flash: Built-in flash and E-TTL II flash metering with shoe mounted flash

Shutter
- Frame rate: 4 frame/s

General
- Dimensions: 146.7×103×69 mm (5.78×4.06×2.72 in), 580g

Chronology
- Replaced: Canon EOS 30 / 33 / 7 / Elan 7 / Elan 7e

The EOS 7s / 30V / ELAN 7NE (Japanese/Asia-Pacific European/North American product names) and the EOS 33V / ELAN 7N (Asia-Pacific Europe/North America) are 35 mm film single-lens reflex cameras from Canon of Japan, launched in April 2004. The 7s/30V/ELAN 7NE employ Canon's Eye Controlled Focus mechanism while the 33V/ELAN 7N do not. These cameras were the replacements for the earlier EOS 30/33 model.

Perhaps the most important upgrade compared to the EOS 30/33 was the flash metering; this was the first film camera to support Canon's new E-TTL II flash metering system with compatible EX-series external flashes. The autofocus system received a mild upgrade from the earlier model and is equivalent to the system in the contemporaneous EOS 10D. A minor but significant improvement was a backlight for the LCD on the upper panel, allowing the camera's settings to be viewed without a flashlight at night. Other changes included raised letters and symbols on the camera's controls, and a changed external finish.

Class	1987	1988	1989	1990	1991	1992	1993	1994	1995	1996	1997	1998	1999	2000	2001	2002	2003	2004	2005	2006	2007	…	2018
Professional				1					1N					1V									
Professional				RT					1N RS														
High-end				10			5						3										
Advanced		620		600		100				50					30				30V				
Midrange	650				1000F	1000F N		500			500N			300			300V		300X				
Entry-level		750	850	700					5000				3000			3000N		3000V					
Entry-level											IX												
Entry-level												IX 7											
