= Canon EOS-3 =

1998 35mm single-lens reflex camera

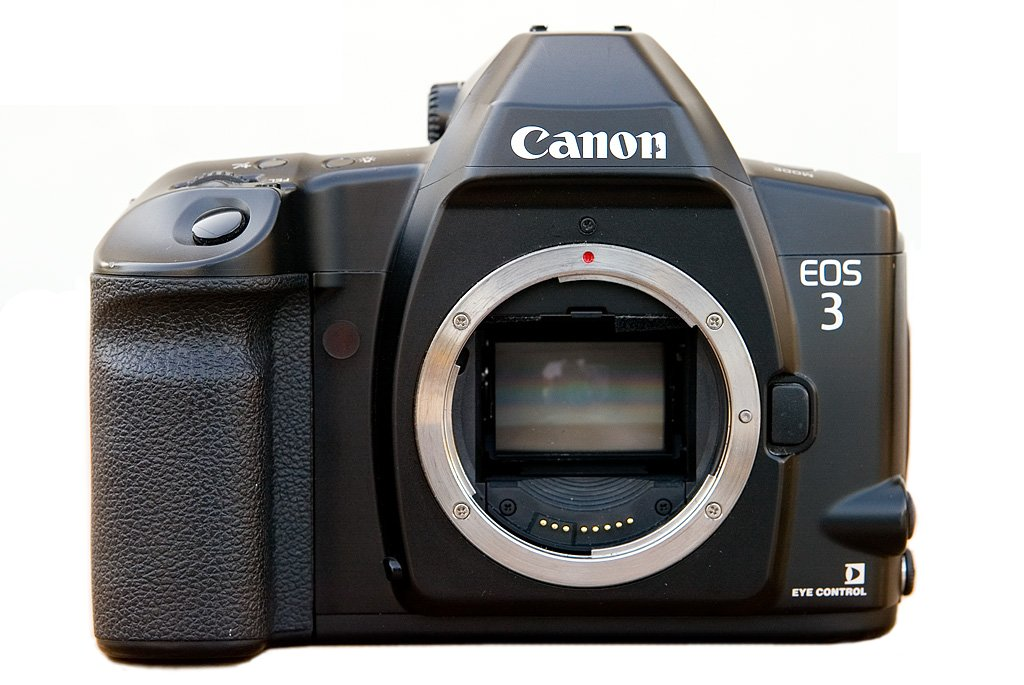

Overview
- Maker: Canon Inc.
- Type: SLR
- Production: 1998-2007

Lens
- Lens mount: Canon EF mount
- Lens: Interchangeable

Sensor/medium
- Sensor type: Film
- Sensor size: 24mm x 36mm; 35mm
- Recording medium: 35mm Film

Focusing
- Focus: Manual Focus; Autofocus; Eye-controlled Auto-Focus
- Focus modes: 1. One-Shot AF: Autofocus stops when focus is achieved. AF lock enabled. Shutter releases only when focus is achieved.; 2. Predictive AF with Al Servo AF: Tracks subject movement up to the start of exposure. Predictive AF enabled. The shutter can be released at any time regardless of focus (predictive AF control takes effect during continuous shooting), no in-focus indicator (blinks at 8 Hz only if AF fails).; 3. Manual focusing: Enabled with the focusing ring when the lens focus mode switch is set to MF (or M).; 4. Full- time manual focusing: Enabled with the electronic focusing ring during continuous shooting (except during film exposure).; 5. In- focus indicator: Lights in viewfinder and beeps. (Beeper can be disabled.)
- Focus areas: 45-point autofocus

Exposure/metering
- Exposure modes: 1. Program AE(shiftable); 2. Shutter speed-priority AE ( in 1/3,1/2 or full stops, safety shift enable with Custom Function); 3. Aperture-priority AE (in 1/3,1/2 or full stops, safety shift enabled with Custom Function); 4. Depth-of-field AE; 5. E-TTL program flash AE (high-speed sync, FE lock, and wireless control enabled with 550EX); 6.A-TTL program flash AE; 7. TTL program flash AE; 8. Manual; 9. Bulb
- Exposure metering: 0-20 EV (at 20°C / 68°F; with 50/1.4 lens, ISO 100)
- Metering modes: TTL maximum aperture metering with a 21 zone silicon photocell 1. Evaluative2. Partial (8.5% of viewfinder at centre);3. Centre spot (approx. 2.4% of viewfinder at centre); 4. Spot metering (linked to focusing point at approx. 2.4% of viewfinder)

Flash
- Flash: Hot shoe compatible with: E-TTL autoflash, A-TTL autoflash, TTL autoflash

Shutter
- Frame rate: 4 frames/sec; 7 frames/sec with PB-E2
- Shutter: Vertical-travel, focal-plane shutter with all speeds electronically controlled.
- Shutter speeds: 30 to 1/8000 sec in 1/3 stops; X-sync at 1/200 sec.

Viewfinder
- Viewfinder: Eye-level pentaprism

General
- Battery: 1. One 2CR5 lithium battery housed in the camera grip.; 2. With Power Drive Booster PB-E2, 8 size-AA alkaline, Ni-Cd, or lithium batteries or Ni-MH Pack NP-E2. (Camera grip removed).; 3. With Battery Pack BP-E1, 1 2CR5 Lithium battery and 4 size-AA alkaline or Ni-Cd batteries(Camera grip removed)
- Body features: Weather sealed body
- Dimensions: 161×119.2×70.8 mm (6.34×4.69×2.79 in)
- Weight: 780 g (28 oz) (Excluding lithium battery)

The Canon EOS-3 is a 35mm film single-lens reflex camera for professionals and advanced amateurs built by Canon of Japan. It was introduced in November 1998 and was offered as recently as 2007.

Unlike the EOS-5 it replaced, the EOS-3 shares many features with the EOS-1N, such as its settings and environmental sealing. Additional features shared between the EOS-3 and EOS-1 line include accessories such as the motor-drive and battery pack, which are mostly identical or interchangeable.

The EOS-3 introduced the 45-point autofocus system later used in the EOS-1V, EOS-1D and subsequent Canon professional SLRs. It was the last film or digital camera outside the 1-series, to receive Canon's top-of-the-line AF system until the March 2012 announcement of the EOS 5D Mark III.

The EOS-3 inherited a refined version of the eye-control system of the EOS-5. This system, when calibrated to a given user, allowed for picking one of the 45 points of the autofocus system simply by looking at it though the viewfinder. An infrared transmitter and receiver mounted around the eyepiece monitored the position of the iris, thus "knowing" where the user was looking and then focusing on that point. Notably, eyeglasses and occasionally contact lenses would confuse the system. This feature was never rolled forward to the later 1V body.

The shutter unit of the EOS-3 passed Canon's standard endurance tests of 100,000 shutter cycles whereas the EOS-1V was specified to withstand at least 150,000 shutter cycles.

The EOS-3 incorporated E-TTL flash metering for use with the EX series of external Canon flash units.

Class	1987	1988	1989	1990	1991	1992	1993	1994	1995	1996	1997	1998	1999	2000	2001	2002	2003	2004	2005	2006	2007	…	2018
Professional				1					1N					1V									
Professional				RT					1N RS														
High-end				10			5						3										
Advanced		620		600		100				50					30				30V				
Midrange	650				1000F	1000F N		500			500N			300			300V		300X				
Entry-level		750	850	700					5000				3000			3000N		3000V					
Entry-level											IX												
Entry-level												IX 7											
