= Canon EOS 10D =

2003 APS-C digital single-lens reflex camera

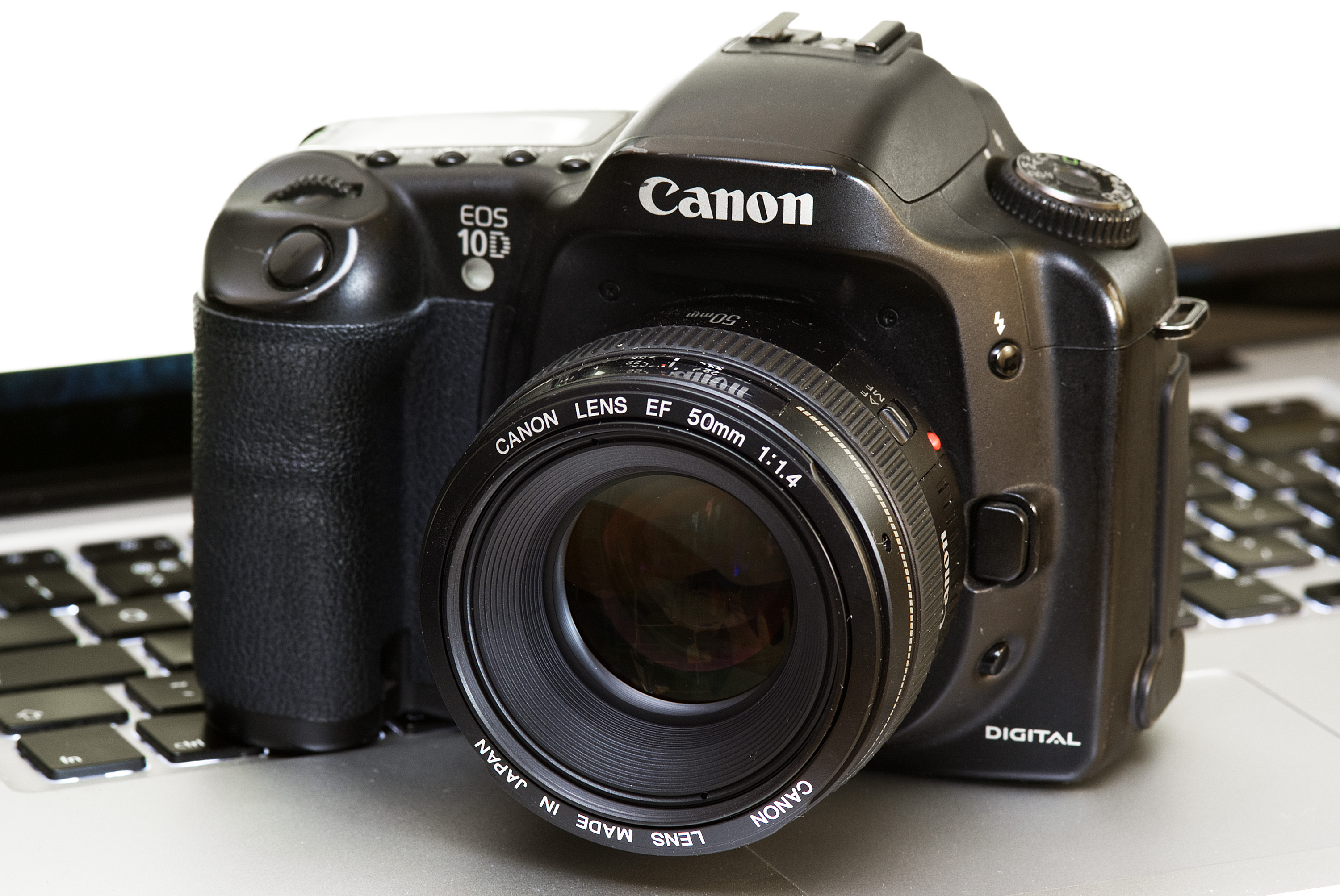
- Canon EOS 10D

Overview
- Maker: Canon Inc.
- Type: Single-lens reflex

Lens
- Lens mount: Canon EF
- Lens: Interchangeable

Sensor/medium
- Sensor: 22.7 mm x 15.1 mm CMOS
- Maximum resolution: 3,072 × 2,048 (6.3 megapixels)
- Film speed: 100–1600, 3200 in extended mode
- Storage media: CompactFlash (CF) (Type I or Type II), Microdrive compatible / max 8GB

Focusing
- Focus modes: One-shot, AI Servo, AI Focus, Manual
- Focus areas: 7 autofocus points, 1 center cross type
- Focus bracketing: none

Exposure/metering
- Exposure modes: Full auto, programmed, shutter-priority, aperture priority, Full manual
- Exposure metering: TTL full aperture, evaluative, partial, center-weighted
- Metering modes: Evaluative 35 zone, Partial, C/Wgt Average

Flash
- Flash: Auto pop-up E-TTL auto flash
- Flash bracketing: none

Shutter
- Shutter: Focal-plane shutter, all speeds electronically controlled
- Shutter speed range: 1/4,000 to 30 s, in 1/2 and 1/3 EV steps, bulb
- Continuous shooting: 3.0 frame/s., up to 9 frames

Viewfinder
- Viewfinder: Optical with 95% coverage

Image processing
- White balance: 7 presets, Auto and custom, 2800-10000 kelvins in 100 K steps
- WB bracketing: +/-3 levels

General
- LCD screen: 1.8 in (46 mm), 118,000 pixels
- Battery: Li-Ion BP-511/512 rechargeable battery
- Optional battery packs: BP-511A, BG-ED3
- Dimensions: 149.7×107.5×75.0 mm (5.89×4.23×2.95 in)
- Weight: 790 g (28 oz) (body only)
- Made in: Japan

Chronology
- Predecessor: Canon EOS D60
- Successor: Canon EOS 20D

The Canon EOS 10D is a discontinued 6.3-megapixel semi-professional digital SLR camera, initially announced on 27 February 2003. It replaced the EOS D60, which is also a 6.3-megapixel digital SLR camera. It was succeeded by the EOS 20D in August 2004.

Despite having an APS-C sensor, the 10D was introduced before EF-S lenses became available and was incompatible with them. The 10D is compatible only with EF lenses. All successive Canon Digital SLR cameras with APS-C sensors can mount EF-S lenses.

The 10D captured RAW images in the Canon CRW file format, which was retired by Canon, although modern versions of Canon's Digital Photo Professional will read it.

When it was released, recommended retail price in the USA was $1,999 (£1,520).

== Compared to the D60 ==
While the 10D shared some similarities with the D60—both used sensors of roughly the same resolution, both used the EF lens mount and BG-ED3 battery grip—the 10D saw many major changes.

A new magnesium alloy body with changed button layout was introduced, including relocating the on/off switch to the bottom rear of the camera where it could easily be switched off accidentally. New LCD panels were introduced. The on/off switch was later moved back to the upper-left of the camera's rear with the Canon 7D. Flash strobes were used instead of a dedicated autofocus assist lamp. The shutter and mirror were also quieter than the D60 systems. An upgraded autofocus system, using a more-sensitive and wider-area 7-point array similar to the Canon EOS 30V was also included.

Internally, the sensor was changed to use a new manufacturing process, allowing for an extended film speed range of ISO 100 to 3200 with a custom function. The 10 used an upgraded image processor, and was the first DSLR to use the DIGIC chipset. Continuous shooting was also slightly improved, allowing for nine images in a burst. The camera introduced FAT32 for CompactFlash cards larger than 2 GB in capacity, the first for a Canon DSLR. Improvements to white balance systems, shooting parameters, sensor cleaning, direct print support, Adobe RGB colorspace, improved language support and an orientation sensor were also made.

== Reception ==
Reviews at the time of release were mostly positive. Bryan Carnathan of The Digital Picture described the affordable price of the 10D as "unheard-of-at-the-time", and the sensor "makes this camera perfect for nature photography", although while the auto-focus was improved from previous models it sometimes did not work properly. Lori Grunin from CNet gave it a score of 7.2, praising the value, features and performance while also saying that it was tricky to get sharp auto-focusing. Phil Askey from DPReview rated this camera as "Highly Recommended", concluding that "I have no concerns in stating that as things stand (at the time of writing this review) the EOS-10D is the absolute best in class, with the best image quality, lowest high sensitivity noise, superb build quality and excellent price."

Later reviews are less favorable. In 2017 – Canon having manufactured six new generations of high-end APS-C cameras between the 10D and the date of the review – CameraDecision scored it 49% for imaging, 33% for features, 55% for value, 68% for portability, giving an overall score of 46%. They rated it "Average" for all uses except Sport, which was "Good".

== Firmware update ==
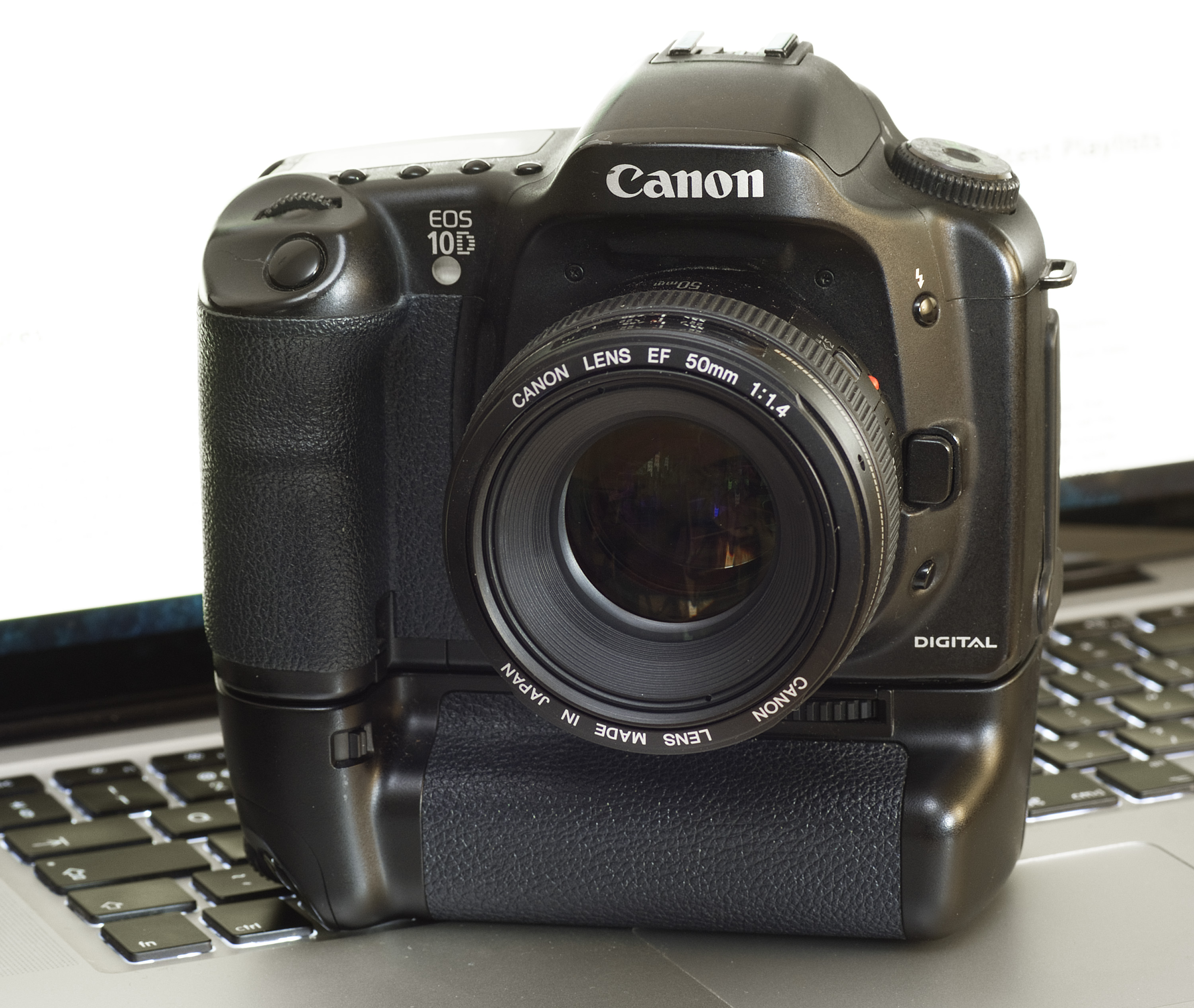
A 10D with the optional BG-ED3 battery grip.

The current firmware update is 2.01 (as of 2011-03-17). It is necessary to update to the firmware to enable PICTBRIDGE support on the Canon EOS 10D. PICTBRIDGE allows the printing of images from a camera directly to a printer, without using a personal computer as an intermediary device.

Type	Sensor	Class	00	01	02	03	04	05	06	07	08	09	10	11	12	13	14	15	16	17	18	19	20	21	22	23	24	25
DSLR	Full-frame	Flagship				1Ds		1Ds Mk II			1Ds Mk III					1D C												
DSLR	Full-frame	Flagship				1Ds		1Ds Mk II			1Ds Mk III				1D X					1D X Mk II ^{T}			1D X Mk III ^{T}					
DSLR	APS-H	Flagship			1D			1D Mk II	1D Mk II N		1D Mk III		1D Mk IV															
DSLR	Full-frame	Professional																	5DS / 5DS R									
DSLR	Full-frame	Professional							5D			_{x} 5D Mk II			_{x} 5D Mk III					5D Mk IV ^{T}								
DSLR	Full-frame	Advanced														_{x} 6D					_{x} 6D Mk II ^{AT}							
DSLR	APS-C	Advanced											_{x} 7D					_{x} 7D Mk II										
DSLR	APS-C	Mid-range						20Da								_{x} 60Da ^{A}												
DSLR	APS-C	Mid-range		D30	D60	10D		20D	30D		40D	_{x} 50D		_{x} 60D ^{A}		_{x} 70D ^{AT}		80D ^{AT}					90D ^{AT}					
DSLR	APS-C	Mid-range																	760D ^{AT}		77D ^{AT}							
DSLR	APS-C	Entry-level					300D	350D		400D	450D	_{x} 500D	_{x} 550D	_{x} 600D ^{A}		_{x} 650D ^{AT}	_{x} 700D ^{AT}		_{x} 750D ^{AT}		800D ^{AT}			850D ^{AT}				
DSLR	APS-C	Entry-level															_{x} 100D ^{T}		_{x} 200D ^{AT}				250D ^{AT}					
DSLR	APS-C	Entry-level										1000D		_{x} 1100D			_{x} 1200D			1300D		2000D						
DSLR	APS-C	Value																				4000D						
Early models			Canon EOS DCS 5 (1995); Canon EOS DCS 3 (1995); Canon EOS DCS 1 (1995); Canon EOS D2000 (1998); Canon EOS D6000 (1998)																									
Type	Sensor	Spec																										
Type	Sensor	Spec	00	01	02	03	04	05	06	07	08	09	10	11	12	13	14	15	16	17	18	19	20	21	22	23	24	25
