= Canon EOS D30 =

2000 APS-C digital single-lens reflex camera

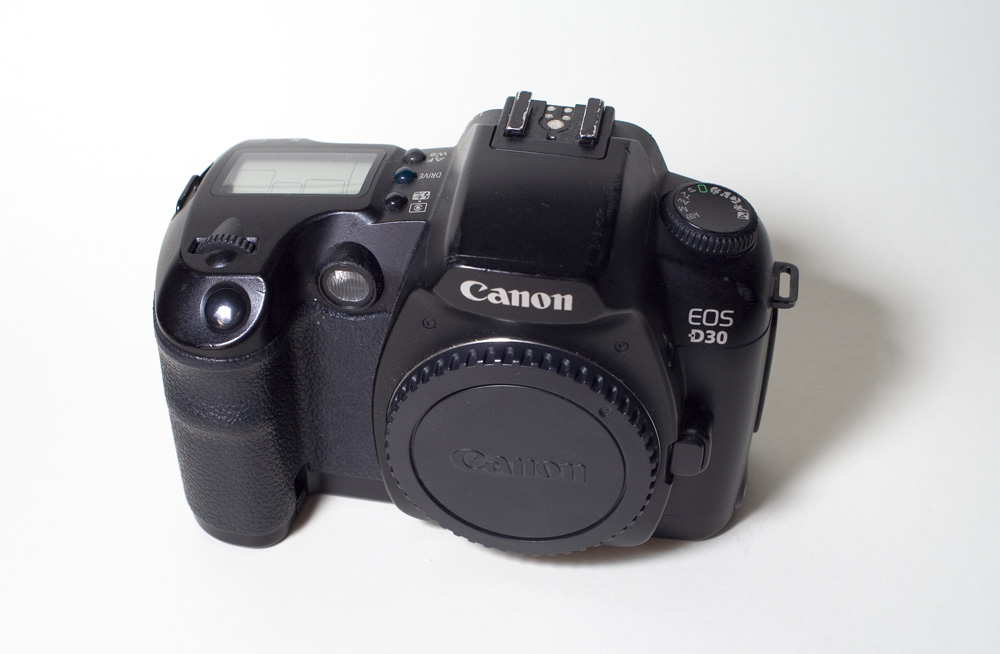

Overview
- Maker: Canon Inc.
- Type: Digital single lens reflex camera

Lens
- Lens mount: Canon EF
- Lens: Interchangeable

Sensor/medium
- Sensor: CMOS
- Maximum resolution: 2,160 x 1,440 (3.1 megapixels)
- Film speed: 100-1600 in 1 EV steps
- Storage media: CompactFlash (CF) (Type I or Type II) and MicroDrive (MD)

Focusing
- Focus modes: One-shot, AI-Servo, AI-Focus, Manual
- Focus areas: 3 points (1 + 1)
- Focus bracketing: none

Exposure/metering
- Exposure modes: Full auto, programmed, shutter-priority, aperture priority, manual
- Exposure metering: TTL, full aperture, zones
- Metering modes: Evaluative, Center Weighted, Average

Flash
- Flash: built-in, pop-up
- Flash bracketing: none

Shutter
- Shutter: electronic focal plane
- Shutter speed range: 30 to 1/4000 s
- Continuous shooting: up to 3.0 frame/s, max 8 frames

Viewfinder
- Viewfinder: Optical

Image processing
- White balance: 7 presets, including Auto and custom
- WB bracketing: none

General
- LCD screen: 1.8 in (46 mm), 114,000 pixels
- Battery: Li-Ion BP-511 rechargeable
- Optional battery packs: BP-511A, BG-ED3 battery grip
- Weight: 780 g (28 oz) (body only)
- Made in: Japan

Chronology
- Predecessor: Canon EOS D2000
- Successor: Canon EOS D60

The Canon EOS D30 is a discontinued 3.1-megapixel professional digital single lens reflex camera (DSLR) body, initially announced by Canon on May 17, 2000. It is part of the Canon EOS line of cameras and uses the EF lens mount. The EOS D30 was Canon's first "home grown" digital SLR. Before that point Canon had a contract with Kodak to rebrand the Kodak 2-megapixel DCS 520 as Canon EOS D2000 and the 6-megapixel DCS 560 as Canon EOS D6000 digital SLRs, which combined Kodak digital backs and Canon camera bodies.

The D30 was succeeded by the 6.3-megapixel D60 in 2002.

== Features ==
- 22.7 x 15.1 mm CMOS sensor (APS-C)
- 3.1 megapixel effective (3.3 megapixel total)
- Max resolution 2160 x 1440
- FOV crop (1.6x)
- Canon EF lens mount (excludes EF-S)
- 3-point auto focus
- 100, 200, 400, 800, 1600 ISO speed equivalent
- 30 to 1/4000 s shutter speed and bulb
- TTL 35 zone SPC metering: evaluative, center weighted, partial
- Exposure compensation -2 EV to +2 EV in 1/3 EV or 1/2 EV steps
- Auto White Balance (plus 5 positions & manual preset)
- Eye-level pentaprism viewfinder
- 1.8 in (46 mm) color TFT liquid-crystal monitor
- E-TTL flash mode
- Built-in Flash
- 3 frames per second continuous shooting (max. 8 frames)
- Dimensions (WxHxD): 150 x 107 x 75 mm
- Weight (body only): 780 g
- Optional BG-ED3 battery grip

Type	Sensor	Class	00	01	02	03	04	05	06	07	08	09	10	11	12	13	14	15	16	17	18	19	20	21	22	23	24	25	26
DSLR	Full-frame	Flagship				1Ds		1Ds Mk II			1Ds Mk III					1D C													
DSLR	Full-frame	Flagship				1Ds		1Ds Mk II			1Ds Mk III				1D X					1D X Mk II ^{T}			1D X Mk III ^{T}						
DSLR	APS-H	Flagship			1D			1D Mk II	1D Mk II N		1D Mk III		1D Mk IV																
DSLR	Full-frame	Professional																	5DS / 5DS R										
DSLR	Full-frame	Professional							5D			_{x} 5D Mk II			_{x} 5D Mk III					5D Mk IV ^{T}									
DSLR	Full-frame	Advanced														_{x} 6D					_{x} 6D Mk II ^{AT}								
DSLR	APS-C	Advanced											_{x} 7D					_{x} 7D Mk II											
DSLR	APS-C	Mid-range						20Da								_{x} 60Da ^{A}													
DSLR	APS-C	Mid-range		D30	D60	10D		20D	30D		40D	_{x} 50D		_{x} 60D ^{A}			_{x} 70D ^{AT}		80D ^{AT}				90D ^{AT}						
DSLR	APS-C	Mid-range																	760D ^{AT}		77D ^{AT}								
DSLR	APS-C	Entry-level					300D	350D		400D	450D	_{x} 500D	_{x} 550D	_{x} 600D ^{A}		_{x} 650D ^{AT}	_{x} 700D ^{AT}		_{x} 750D ^{AT}		800D ^{AT}			850D ^{AT}					
DSLR	APS-C	Entry-level															_{x} 100D ^{T}		_{x} 200D ^{AT}				250D ^{AT}						
DSLR	APS-C	Entry-level										1000D		_{x} 1100D			_{x} 1200D			1300D		2000D							
DSLR	APS-C	Value																				4000D							
Early models			Canon EOS DCS 5 (1995); Canon EOS DCS 3 (1995); Canon EOS DCS 1 (1995); Canon EOS D2000 (1998); Canon EOS D6000 (1998)																										
Type	Sensor	Spec																											
Type	Sensor	Spec	00	01	02	03	04	05	06	07	08	09	10	11	12	13	14	15	16	17	18	19	20	21	22	23	24	25	26
