= Canon BG-ED3 =

Battery grip

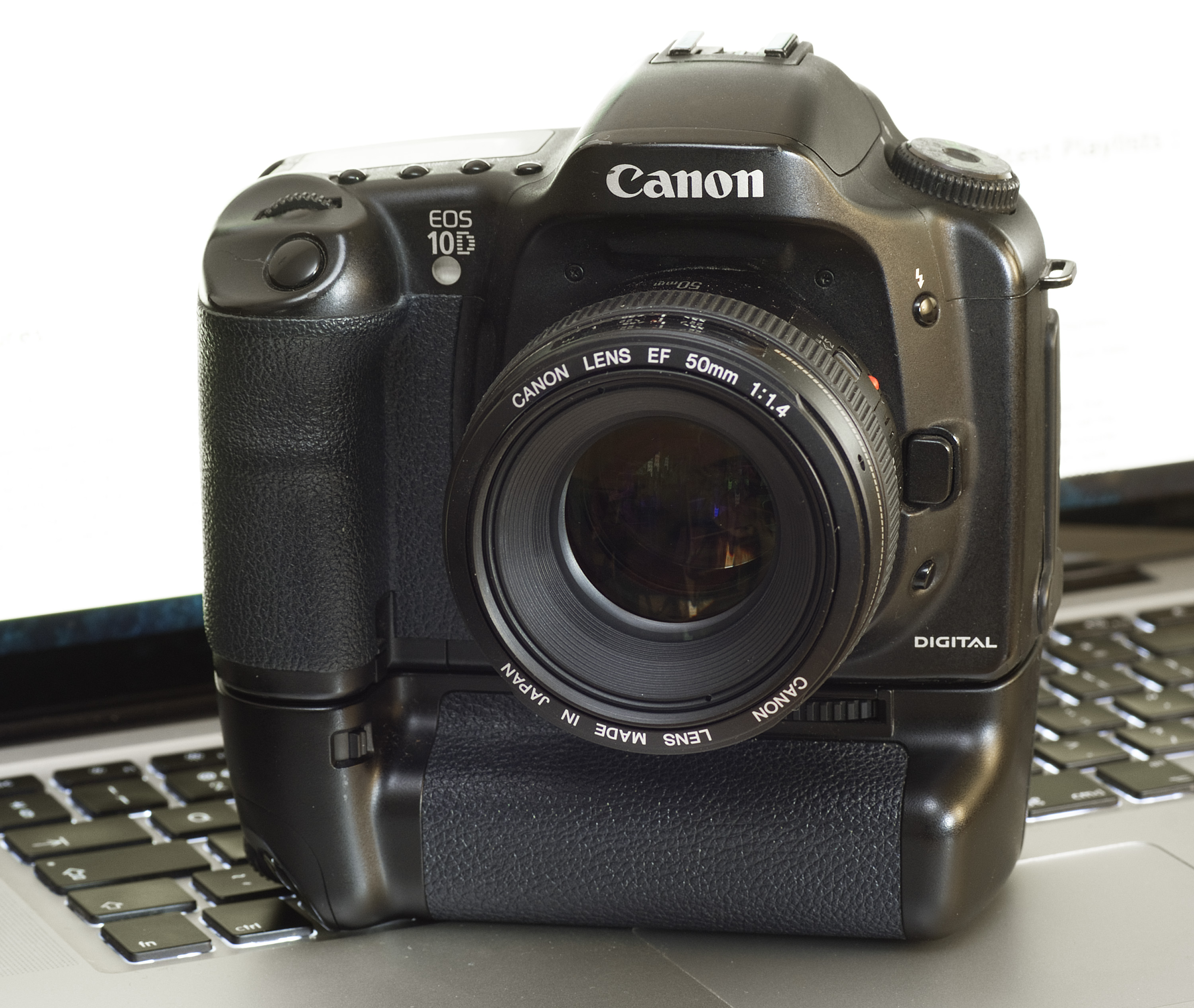
A Canon EOS 10D digital SLR with a BG-ED3 battery grip.

The Canon BG-ED3 is a battery grip manufactured by Canon for certain models of its EOS digital SLR camera range. It was originally designed for the Canon EOS D30. It can hold 2 BP-511 or BP-511A batteries, effectively doubling the battery life of these cameras. The BG-ED3 can also accept the DR-400 DC Coupler, which when attached to a CA-PS400 or AC adapter ACK-E2, draws directly from an AC power source. A BG-ED3 is not necessary to use a compatible EOS camera with the DR-400. This battery grip also has extra buttons for controlling the camera. It has a shutter release button on the corner, making it easier to shoot vertically framed shots, as the button will be under the right index finger of the photographer. There are other buttons, a switch, and a dial. A larger dial is used to turn the screw that secures the grip to the camera body. The camera body's battery cover can be removed without tools since it is held in place with a spring-loaded pin that can be retracted by a fingernail. The BG-ED3 has space to store the camera body's detached battery cover next to the post that slides into the camera body's battery compartment.

It is also compatible with the Canon EOS 10D, D30 and D60 cameras.
