= Canon EOS D60 =

2002 APS-C digital single-lens reflex camera

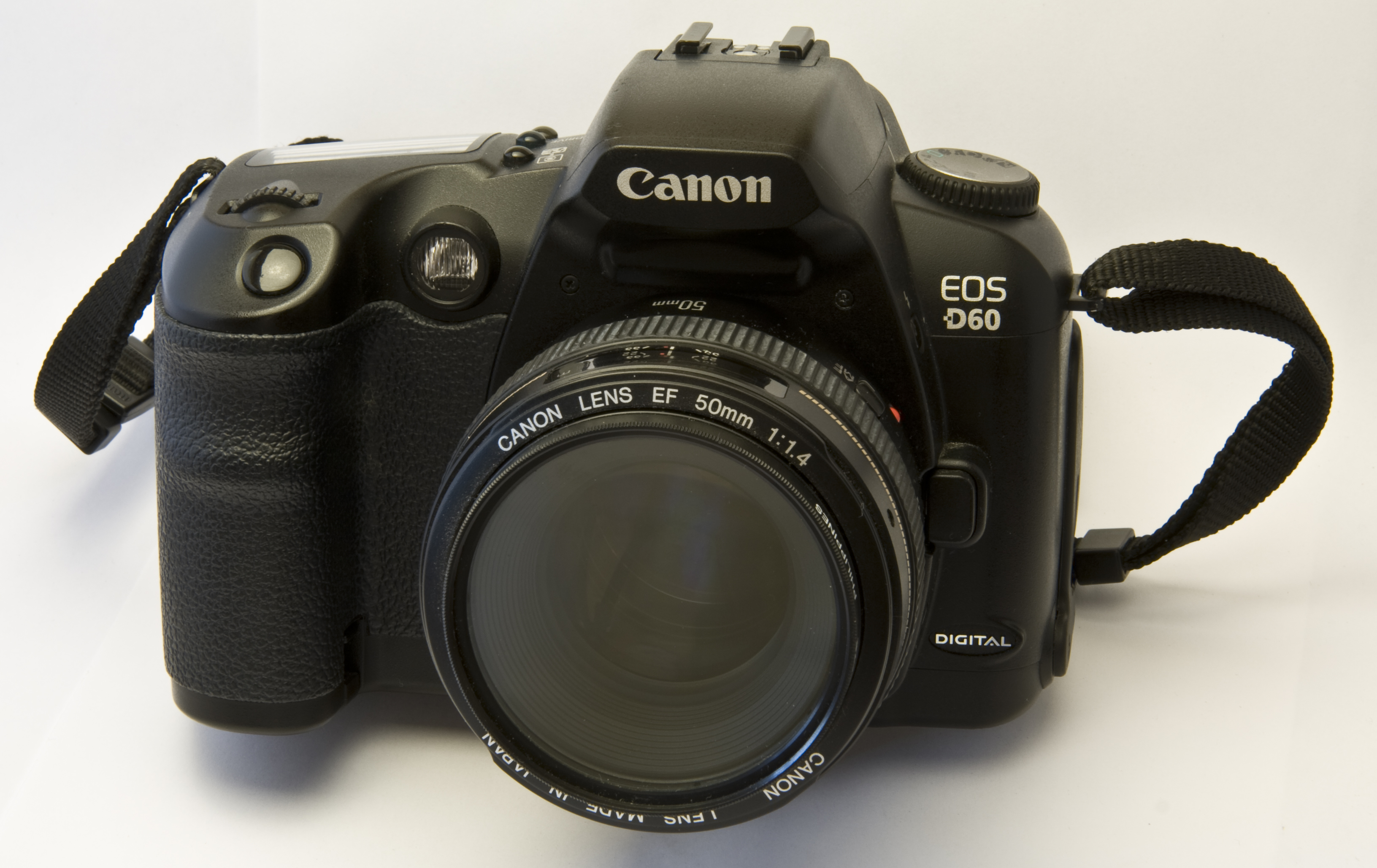

Overview
- Maker: Canon Inc.
- Type: Single-lens reflex

Lens
- Lens mount: Canon EF
- Lens: Interchangeable

Sensor/medium
- Sensor: 22.7 x 15.1 mm CMOS
- Maximum resolution: 3,072 × 2,048 (6.3 megapixels)
- Film speed: 100-1000 in 1 EV steps
- Storage media: CompactFlash

Focusing
- Focus modes: One-shot, AI Servo, AI-Focus, Manual
- Focus areas: 3 focus points
- Focus bracketing: none

Exposure/metering
- Exposure modes: Full auto, programmed, shutter-priority, aperture priority, manual
- Exposure metering: TTL, full aperture, zones
- Metering modes: Evaluative, Partial, Center Weighted

Flash
- Flash: pop-up
- Flash bracketing: none

Shutter
- Shutter: electronic focal-plane
- Shutter speed range: 30 to 1/4000 s
- Continuous shooting: up to 5.4 frame/s

Viewfinder
- Viewfinder: Optical

Image processing
- White balance: 7 presets, Auto and custom
- WB bracketing: none

General
- LCD screen: 1.8 in (46 mm), 114,000 pixels
- Battery: Li-Ion BP-511 rechargeable
- Optional battery packs: BP-511A, BG-ED3
- Weight: 780 g (28 oz) (body only)
- Made in: Japan

Chronology
- Predecessor: Canon EOS D30
- Successor: Canon EOS 10D

The Canon EOS D60 is a discontinued 6.3 megapixel digital single lens reflex (DSLR) camera body, announced by Canon on February 22, 2002. It is part of the Canon EOS range, and accepts Canon EF, TS-E and MP-E lenses, but not Canon's later digital-only EF-S lens range.

The EOS D60 sits in the prosumer (professional-consumer) line of digital SLR cameras. It succeeded the three megapixel EOS D30 and was replaced by the improved, six megapixel EOS 10D.

In America, its initial pricing was US$1,999 for the basic body, or US$2,199 including battery, charger, and DC kit.

== Features ==
The EOS D60 features:

- 22.7 x 15.1 mm CMOS sensor (APS-C)
- 6.3 megapixel effective (6.3 megapixel total)
- Max resolution 3072 x 2048
- FOV crop (1.6x)
- Canon EF lens mount (excludes EF-S)
- 3-point auto focus
- 100, 200, 400, 800, 1000 ISO speed equivalent
- 30 to 1/4000 s shutter speed and bulb
- TTL 35 zone SPC metering: evaluative, center weighted, partial
- Exposure compensation -2 EV to +2 EV in 1/3 EV or 1/2 EV steps
- Auto White Balance (plus 5 positions & manual preset)
- Eye-level pentaprism viewfinder
- 1.8 in (46 mm) color TFT liquid-crystal monitor
- E-TTL flash mode
- 3 frames per second continuous shooting (max. 8 frames)
- Dimensions (WxHxD): 150 x 107 x 75 mm (6.0 x 4.4 x 2.9 in)
- Weight (body only): 780 g

Type	Sensor	Class	00	01	02	03	04	05	06	07	08	09	10	11	12	13	14	15	16	17	18	19	20	21	22	23	24	25	26
DSLR	Full-frame	Flagship				1Ds		1Ds Mk II			1Ds Mk III					1D C													
DSLR	Full-frame	Flagship				1Ds		1Ds Mk II			1Ds Mk III				1D X					1D X Mk II ^{T}			1D X Mk III ^{T}						
DSLR	APS-H	Flagship			1D			1D Mk II	1D Mk II N		1D Mk III		1D Mk IV																
DSLR	Full-frame	Professional																	5DS / 5DS R										
DSLR	Full-frame	Professional							5D			_{x} 5D Mk II			_{x} 5D Mk III					5D Mk IV ^{T}									
DSLR	Full-frame	Advanced														_{x} 6D					_{x} 6D Mk II ^{AT}								
DSLR	APS-C	Advanced											_{x} 7D					_{x} 7D Mk II											
DSLR	APS-C	Mid-range						20Da								_{x} 60Da ^{A}													
DSLR	APS-C	Mid-range		D30	D60	10D		20D	30D		40D	_{x} 50D		_{x} 60D ^{A}			_{x} 70D ^{AT}		80D ^{AT}				90D ^{AT}						
DSLR	APS-C	Mid-range																	760D ^{AT}		77D ^{AT}								
DSLR	APS-C	Entry-level					300D	350D		400D	450D	_{x} 500D	_{x} 550D	_{x} 600D ^{A}		_{x} 650D ^{AT}	_{x} 700D ^{AT}		_{x} 750D ^{AT}		800D ^{AT}			850D ^{AT}					
DSLR	APS-C	Entry-level															_{x} 100D ^{T}		_{x} 200D ^{AT}				250D ^{AT}						
DSLR	APS-C	Entry-level										1000D		_{x} 1100D			_{x} 1200D			1300D		2000D							
DSLR	APS-C	Value																				4000D							
Early models			Canon EOS DCS 5 (1995); Canon EOS DCS 3 (1995); Canon EOS DCS 1 (1995); Canon EOS D2000 (1998); Canon EOS D6000 (1998)																										
Type	Sensor	Spec																											
Type	Sensor	Spec	00	01	02	03	04	05	06	07	08	09	10	11	12	13	14	15	16	17	18	19	20	21	22	23	24	25	26
