= Dioptric correction =

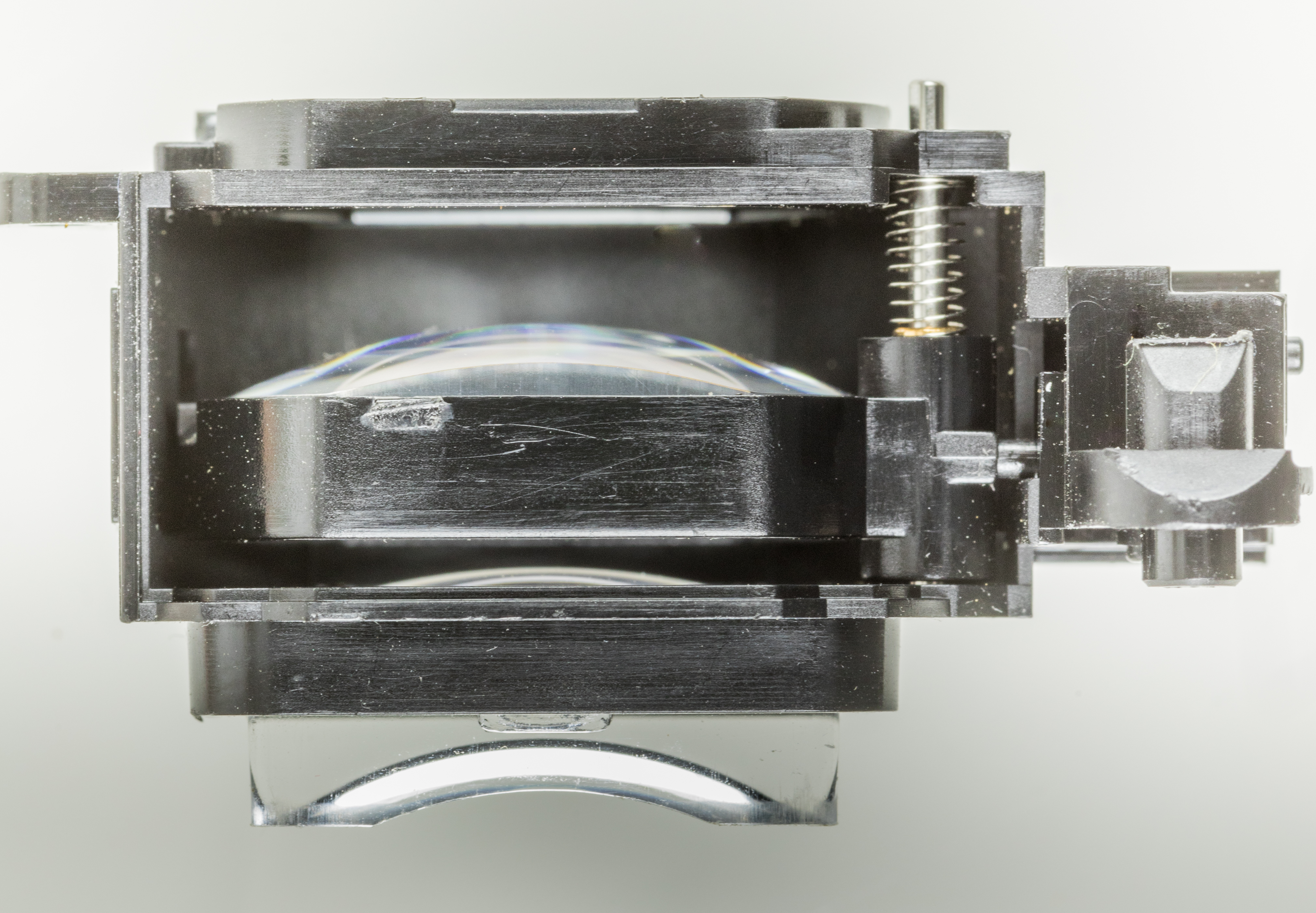
Dioptric correction of a Nikon 90. The middle lens can be manually moved for dioptric correction. At the bottom of the image: the eyeglass

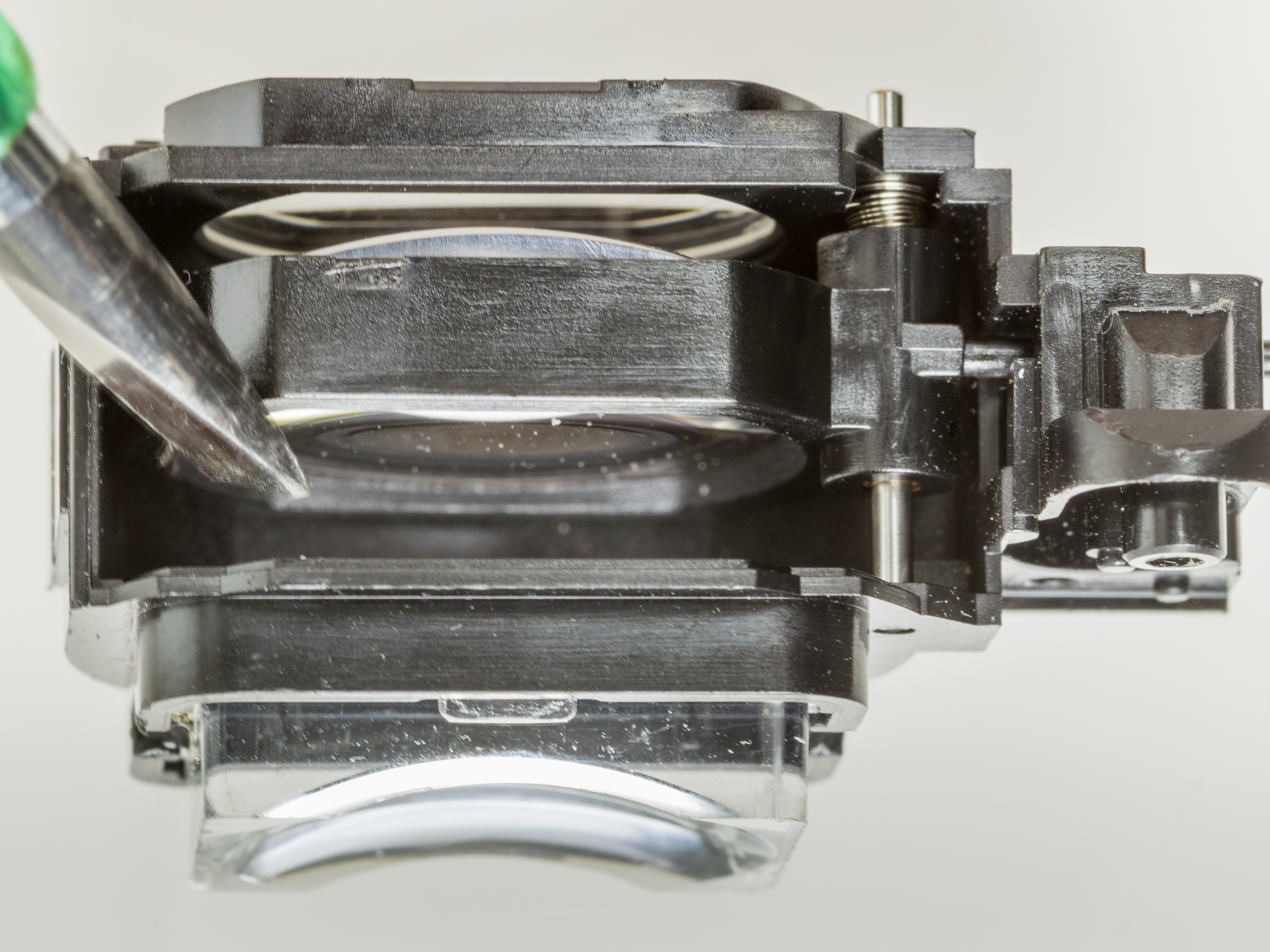
Dioptric correction of a Nikon 90. The middle lens can be manually moved for dioptric correction. On the left: the head of a screwdriver has moved the lens a bit. At the bottom of the image: the eyeglass

Dioptric correction is the expression for the adjustment of the optical instrument to the varying visual acuity of a person's eyes. It is the adjustment of one lens to provide compatible focus when the viewer's eyes have differing visual capabilities. One result is less strain on the eyes that allow for optimal viewing and depth and contrast focusing when composing a photograph or viewing an item through a device made of lenses or lens elements.
