= Canon EOS 30 =

2000 35mm single-lens reflex camera

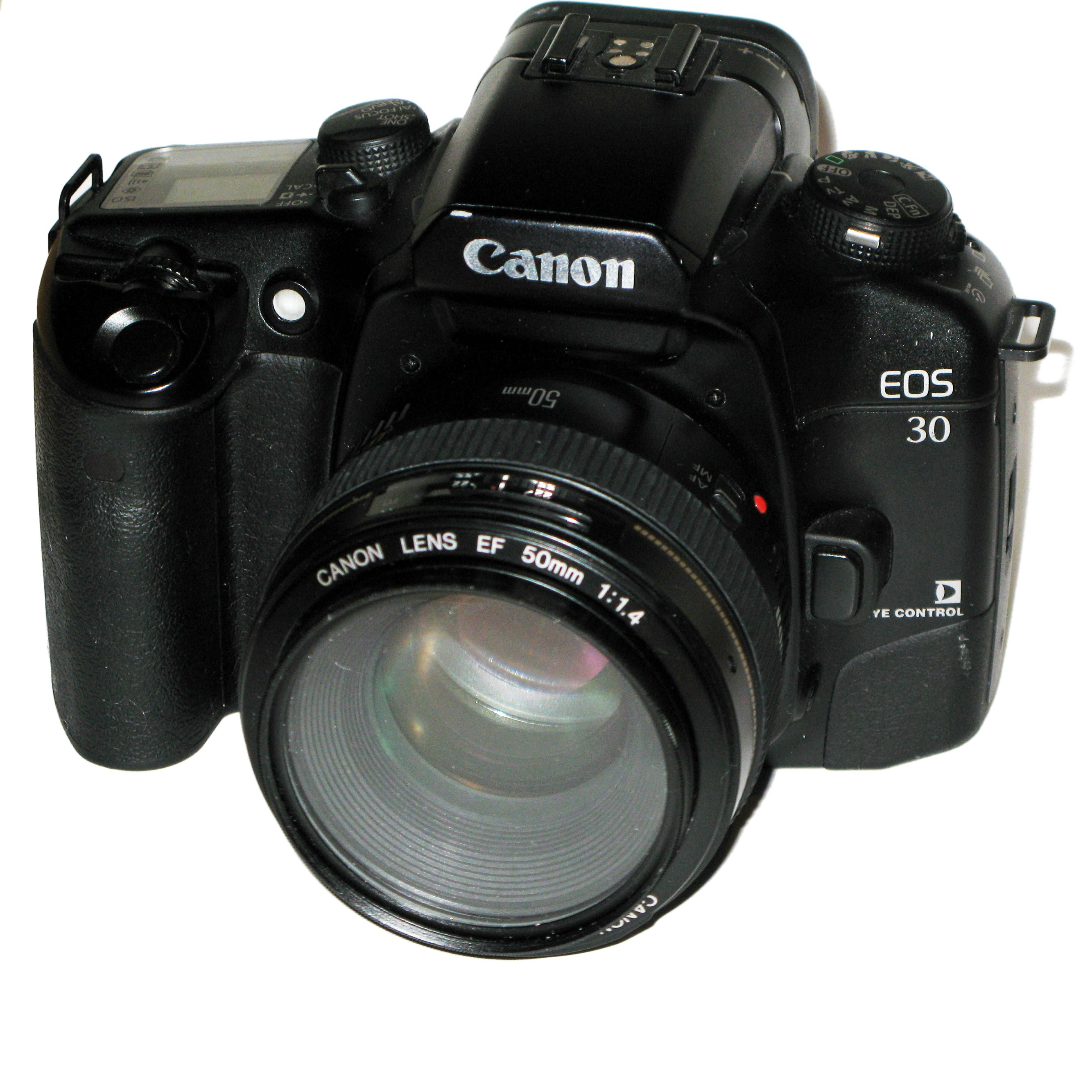

Overview
- Maker: Canon
- Type: 35mm SLR
- Released: October 2000
- Production: 2000–2004

Lens
- Lens mount: Canon EF lens mount

Focusing
- Focus: TTL Phase Detection Autofocus (7 zone)

Exposure/metering
- Exposure: PASM Autoexposure; 35 zone evaluative metering

Flash
- Flash: Built-in flash and E-TTL flash metering with shoe mounted flash

Shutter
- Frame rate: 4 frame/s

General
- Dimensions: 146.7×103×69 mm (5.78×4.06×2.72 in), 580g

Chronology
- Replaced: Canon EOS 50 / 55 / Elan II / Elan IIE
- Replaced by: Canon EOS 30V / 33V / 7S / Elan 7N / Elan 7NE

The Canon EOS 30/33 (also known as the EOS Elan 7e/7) is a single-lens reflex film camera from Canon's EOS series, released in October 2000. This camera is sold in Japan under the name Canon EOS 7. The EOS 30/ELAN 7E has eye controlled focusing while the EOS 33/ELAN 7 does not. Otherwise the two cameras are identical. It was replaced by a minor update with the EOS 30V/ELAN 7N.

Class	1987	1988	1989	1990	1991	1992	1993	1994	1995	1996	1997	1998	1999	2000	2001	2002	2003	2004	2005	2006	2007	…	2018
Professional				1					1N					1V									
Professional				RT					1N RS														
High-end				10			5						3										
Advanced		620		600		100				50					30				30V				
Midrange	650				1000F	1000F N		500			500N			300			300V		300X				
Entry-level		750	850	700					5000				3000			3000N		3000V					
Entry-level											IX												
Entry-level												IX 7											
