= Canon EOS 1000 =

1990 35mm single-lens reflex camera

Canon EOS 1000 / EOS Rebel
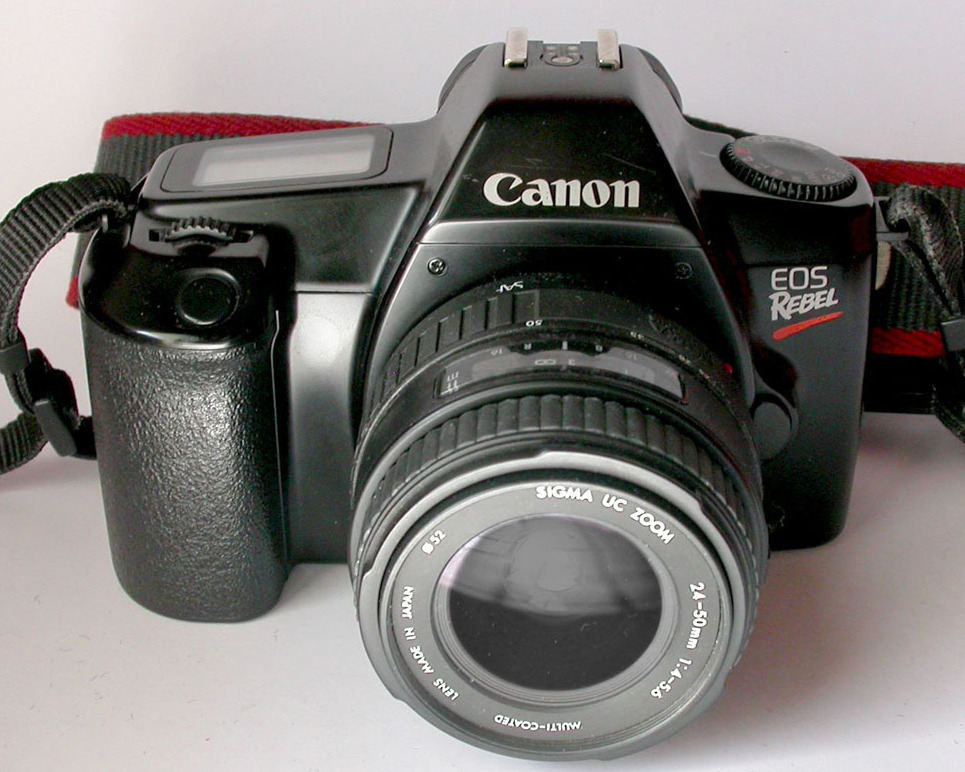
- EOS Rebel, the base model without integrated flash

Overview
- Maker: Canon Inc.
- Type: Single-lens reflex

Lens
- Lens mount: Canon EF
- Lens: Interchangeable

Sensor/medium
- Film format: 135 film
- Film size: 36 × 24 mm

Focusing
- Focus: Automatic

General
- Made in: Taiwan

The Canon EOS 1000 (sold as the Canon EOS Rebel in the Americas) is an autofocus 35mm film, SLR camera introduced by Canon in 1990.

There were several variants:

- EOS 1000 / EOS Rebel - Base model without built-in flash or databack
- EOS 1000F / EOS Rebel S - with built-in flash
- EOS 1000F QD / EOS 1000 QD / EOS Rebel S QD - with built-in flash and quartz databack
- EOS 1000 QD-P - Integrated flash, quartz databack and panorama function

The "EOS Rebel"-branded versions were the first models to use the "Rebel" name.

The Canon EF-M was a cheaper camera based on the same body as the EOS 1000, but with manual focus only and no top LCD panel.

| Class | 1987 | 1988 | 1989 | 1990 | 1991 | 1992 | 1993 | 1994 | 1995 | 1996 | 1997 | 1998 | 1999 | 2000 | 2001 | 2002 | 2003 | 2004 | 2005 | 2006 | 2007 | … | 2018 |
| Professional | | | | 1 | | | | | 1N | | | | | 1V | | | | | | | | | |
| Professional | | | | RT | | | | | 1N RS | | | | | | | | | | | | | | |
| High-end | | | | 10 | | | 5 | | | | | | 3 | | | | | | | | | | |
| Advanced | | 620 | | 600 | | 100 | | | | 50 | | | | | 30 | | | | 30V | | | | |
| Midrange | 650 | | | | 1000F | 1000F N | | 500 | | | 500N | | | 300 | | | 300V | | 300X | | | | |
| Entry-level | | 750 | 850 | 700 | | | | | 5000 | | | | 3000 | | | 3000N | | 3000V | | | | | |
| Entry-level | | | | | | | | | | | IX | | | | | | | | | | | | |
| Entry-level | | | | | | | | | | | | IX 7 | | | | | | | | | | | |
