= Canon EOS 5 =

1992 35mm single-lens reflex camera

Canon EOS A2
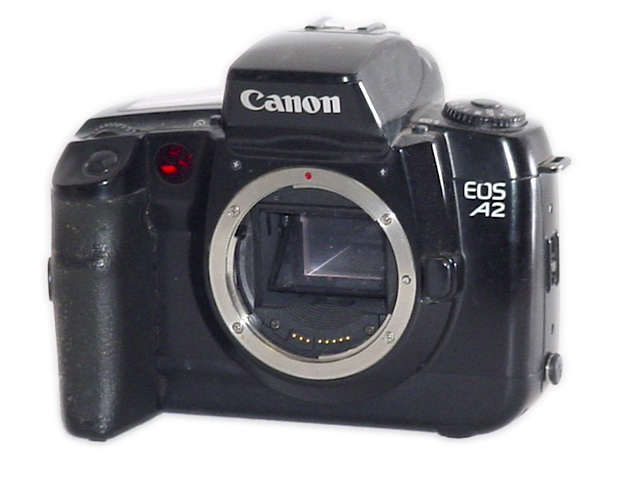

Overview
- Maker: Canon
- Type: 35 mm SLR
- Released: November 1992
- Production: 1992–1998

Lens
- Lens mount: Canon EF lens mount

Focusing
- Focus: TTL Phase Detection Autofocus (5 zone)

Exposure/metering
- Exposure: PASM autoexposure 16 zone evaluative metering

Flash
- Flash: Built-in flash

Shutter
- Frame rate: Up to 5 frame/s

General
- Dimensions: 154×121×74 mm (6.1×4.8×2.9 in), 675 g (1.488 lb)

The Canon EOS 5 (sold as the EOS A2 and A2e in the USA) is a semi-professional autofocus, autoexposure 35 mm SLR film camera. It was sold from November 1992 onwards, and was replaced in late 1998 by the Canon EOS 3. As part of the EOS line of cameras, the 5/A2/A2e utilized Canon's EF bayonet lens mount, first introduced in 1987.

The 5/A2/A2e featured a built-in zoom flash, AF assist light, fast motor drives and several pre-set autoexposure modes. Although marketed towards the "prosumer" user, the 5/A2/A2e were popular among professional photographers. The camera was powered by a 6 volt lithium 2CR5 battery, or, with the optional Canon BP-5 Battery Pack, could be powered by D batteries attached to the belt of the user. The Canon VG-10 Vertical Grip added a shutter release, control wheel, AE Lock button and Focus Point Selection button to the bottom of the camera for portrait orientation use, but did not add AA batteries as a power source.

The camera had many operational modes available, selected by the dial on the left-hand side of the camera. These modes selected whether the exposure settings were set automatically, semiautomatically or fully manually. This dial also doubled as an on/off switch.

The Canon EOS 5/A2/A2e had three built-in metering modes; Evaluative, center-weight average and spot. These were user-selectable by means of a button on the back of the camera and the command dial.

The EOS 5/A2e featured eye-controlled focusing, which allowed the user to select from one of five focus points by looking at it through the viewfinder as well as activating depth-of-field preview by looking at a sixth point marked in the top-left corner of the viewfinder. At the time, this feature was unique to Canon. The A2 had the same five focus points, but they could only be selected manually. Although the EOS 5 had an optional vertical grip, the VG-10, the eye-controlled focussing feature only worked when the camera was held in horizontal orientation.

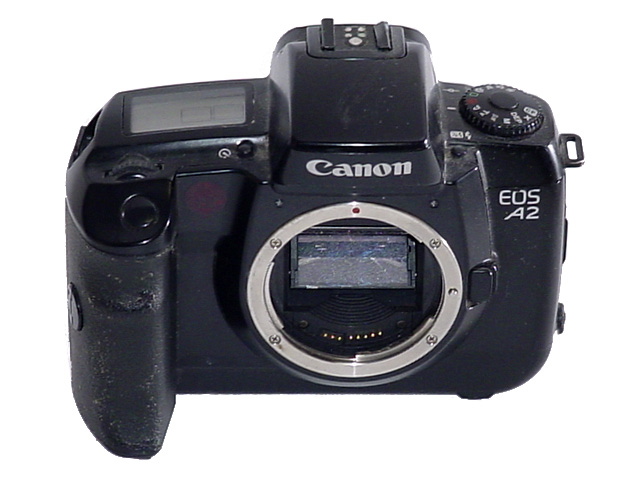
Canon EOS A2 Autofocus SLR

The 5/A2/A2e has two dials to control exposure, one over the shutter button and one on the back of the camera. The dial above the shutter button will adjust the shutter speed in shutter priority TV/Time value mode, but in aperture priority Av/Aperture value mode this same dial will adjust the lens aperture. In full manual mode, the dial above the shutter reverts to adjusting the shutter speed, and the back dial controls the aperture.

At the time of the camera's production, there was a U.S. patent on the use of a digital scale to show under- or over-exposure in a metered-manual SLR. Canon did not want to pay the patent holder, and therefore omitted the -2/+2 (in half-stops) scale in the A2/A2e, leaving just an over or under indication. The European/Japanese market EOS 5 had the scale and on account of this many American photographers preferred the imported model. This is a firmware difference only, and there is at least one third-party firm which will install EOS 5 firmware on an A2/A2e, thereby adding this scale.

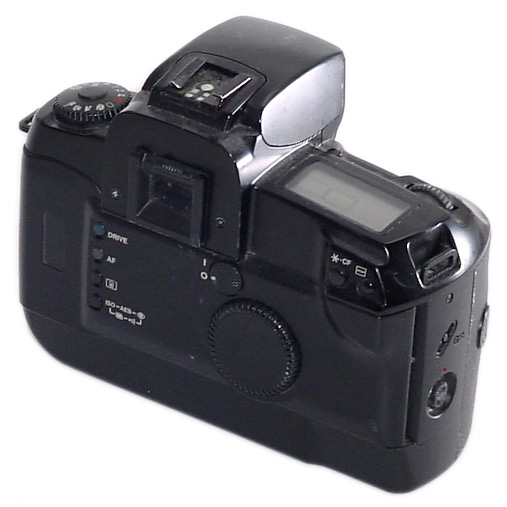
Back and top view of the Canon EOS A2

== Features ==
- TTL Phases Detection AlFocus
- Shutter 30 s – 1/8000 s
- Viewfinder 92% vertical coverage, 94% horizontal coverage, 0.73 magnification
- 16 zone evaluative metering
- AF operating range at ISO 100: EV 0–18
- Built-in zoom flash, three focal length-dependent settings
- Five frames per second in one shot AF mode
- Three frames per second in AI servo AF mode
- Five horizontal autofocus sensors
- Eye-controlled focusing (EOS 5/A2e)
- 16 Custom functions
- Requires one 6V 2CR5 battery
- Dimensions and weight 154 × 121 × 74 mm, 675 g (1.488 lb)

Class	1987	1988	1989	1990	1991	1992	1993	1994	1995	1996	1997	1998	1999	2000	2001	2002	2003	2004	2005	2006	2007	…	2018
Professional				1					1N					1V									
Professional				RT					1N RS														
High-end				10			5						3										
Advanced		620		600		100				50					30				30V				
Midrange	650				1000F	1000F N		500			500N			300			300V		300X				
Entry-level		750	850	700					5000				3000			3000N		3000V					
Entry-level											IX												
Entry-level												IX 7											
