= Canon EF-M camera =

35mm SLR camera

Canon EF-M
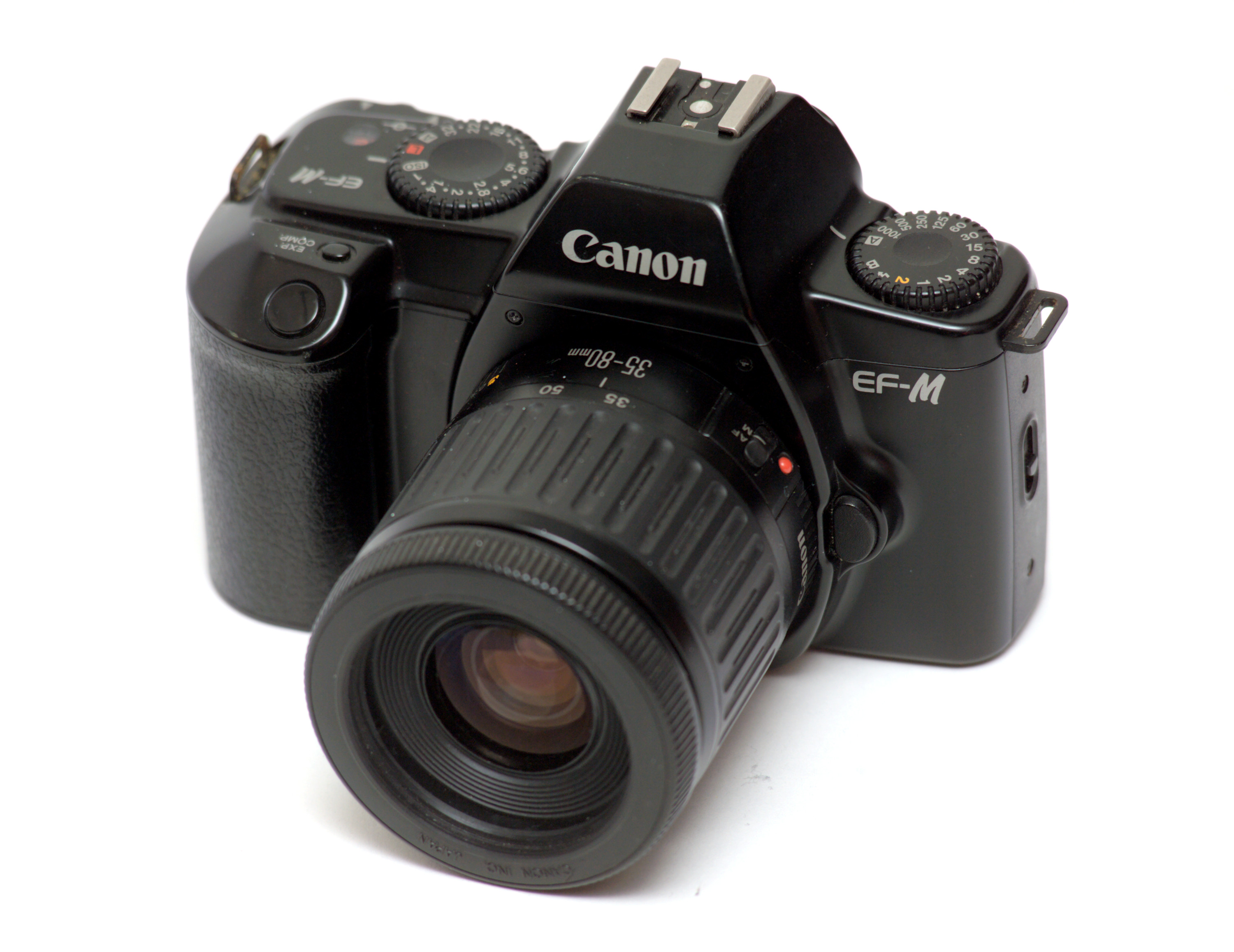

Overview
- Maker: Canon Inc.
- Type: Single-lens reflex
- Released: September 1991

Lens
- Lens mount: Canon EF
- Lens: Interchangeable

Sensor/medium
- Film format: 135 film
- Film size: 36 × 24 mm
- Film speed: ISO 6 – 6400
- Film advance: Automatic
- Film rewind: Automatic

Focusing
- Focus: Manual

Flash
- Flash: Hot shoe
- Flash synchronization: 1/90s

Shutter
- Shutter: Mechanical
- Shutter speed range: 2s – 1/1000s

Viewfinder
- Viewfinder: Fixed eye-level pentaprism
- Viewfinder magnification: 0.75×

General
- Battery: 1× 2CR5
- Dimensions: 148×97×68 mm (5.8×3.8×2.7 in)
- Weight: 390 g (14 oz)

References
- "EF-M". Canon Camera Museum.

The Canon EF-M was a manual-focus 35mm film, SLR camera which used the Canon EF lens mount. It was introduced in 1991 for export to the non-Japanese market, and was the only manual focus camera in the EF line. It was not sold as part of the EOS range; the camera's official name was Canon EF-M rather than Canon EOS EF-M.

The EF-M was in essence a Canon EOS 1000 without autofocus that replaced the top-deck LCD with a control dial. It was priced slightly cheaper than the EOS 1000, and relatively few units were sold. It was not directly available in Japan, though some were re-imported. It was sold with a standard 35-80mm kit lens. The lens came with an adapter ring that was intended to make manual focusing easier.

Unlike all EOS bodies, it came with an optical manual focus aid, a split-image focusing screen as well as a ring of microprisms. This system was common with manual focus SLRs but had since fallen out of use in the autofocus era.

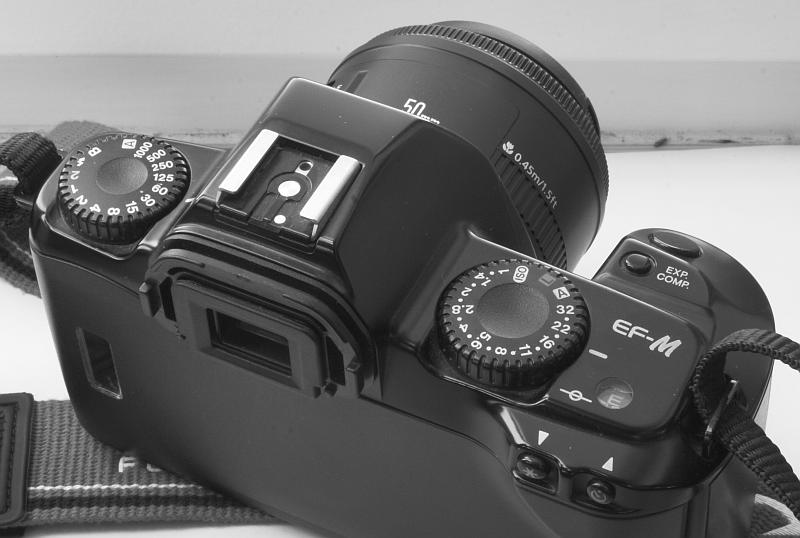
Backside view of the Canon EF-M
