= Peugeot E7 =

Peugeot E7 Hackney Taxi

Overview
- Manufacturer: Peugeot
- Production: 1990—present

Chronology
- Predecessor: E7 Classic

The Peugeot E7 is a purpose built hackney cab. The vehicle provides full wheelchair accessibility and holds EC Whole Vehicle Type Approval. It is powered by Peugeot HDi engines.

It is licensed to operate in 93% of all local authority areas across the UK, including cities such as Birmingham, Liverpool, Leeds, Leicester, Sheffield, Newcastle upon Tyne, Sunderland, Southampton, Stafford, Bristol, Cardiff, Belfast, Edinburgh and Glasgow.

The E7 is based on the Peugeot Expert and has a sliding underfloor wheelchair ramp. It comes in a 3 model range which are S, SE and XS. There is also a plus version where there is an extra 12" on the back for more luggage space. These can be ordered in the colours of Black, Bianca White, Parthenon White and Dragoon Blue. There are also metallic colours which are Aluminium, Iron Grey, Aster Grey, Azzuro Blue, Golden White and Ruby Red. There is also a 6 speed gear box and Auto was available from 2013 onwards.

The Peugeot E7 was viewed as a rival to the traditional London Black Cab.
