= Canon EOS =

Autofocus system camera product line

- Logo

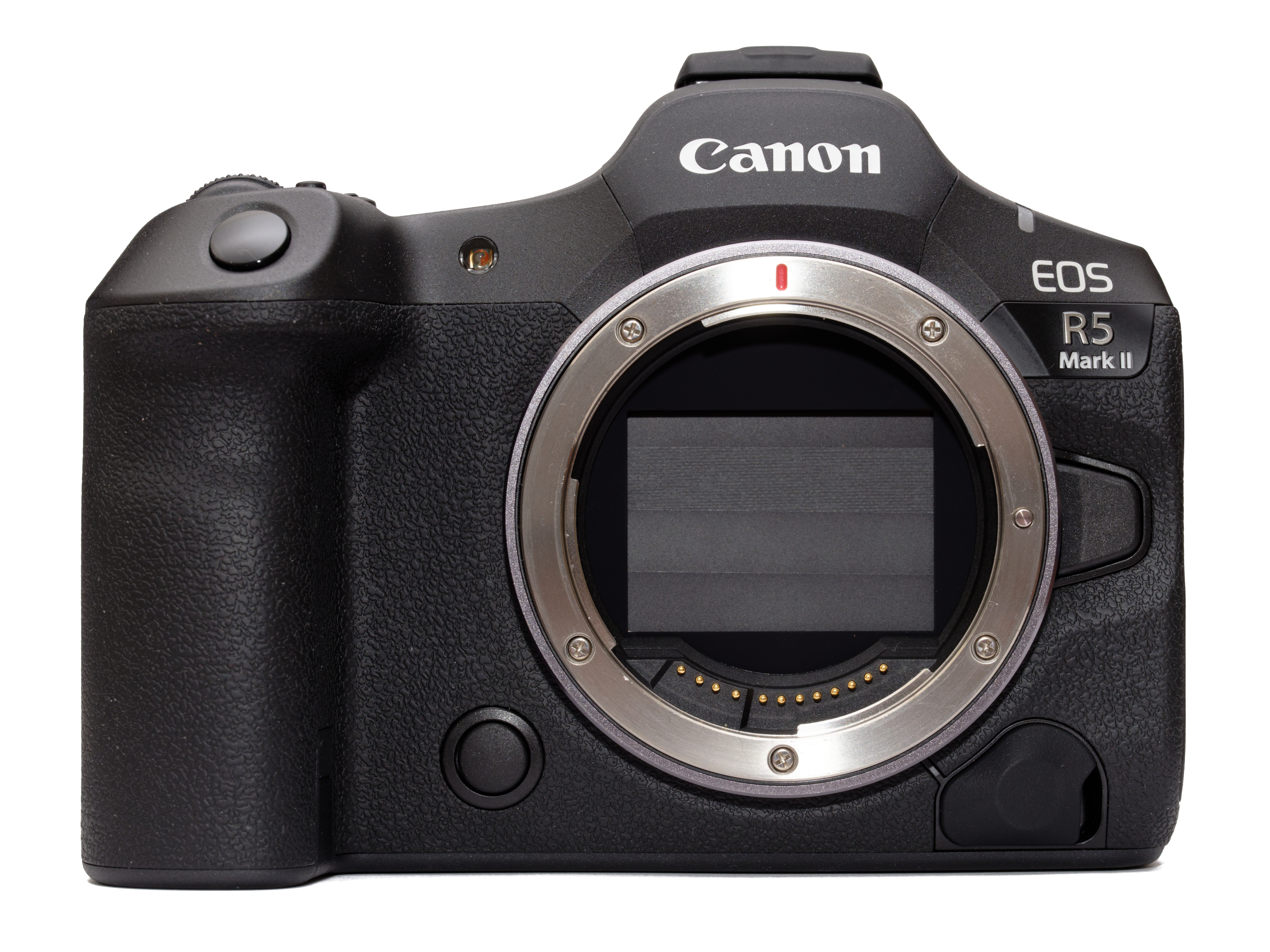
- Canon EOS R5 Mark II (2024)
- Product type: System camera (SLR, DSLR, MILC); Camera lens
- Current owner: Canon Inc.
- Produced by: Canon Inc.; Kodak (formerly)
- Country: Japan
- Introduced: March 2, 1987; 39 years ago
- Related brands: Canon Cinema EOS; Canon Speedlite
- Markets: Worldwide

Canon EOS (Electro-Optical System) is a series of cameras with autofocus capabilities produced by Canon Inc. The brand was introduced in 1987 with the Canon EOS 650, a single-lens reflex camera. Since then, EOS has become Canon's flagship series of interchangeable-lens cameras, with at least one new camera release each year. All EOS cameras used 35 mm or APS-format film until Canon introduced the EOS D30, the company's first in-house digital single-lens reflex camera, in 2000. Since 2005, all newly announced EOS cameras have used digital image sensors rather than film, with EOS mirrorless cameras introduced in 2012. Since 2020, all newly announced EOS cameras have been mirrorless systems.

EOS cameras are primarily characterized by boxy black camera bodies with curved horizontal grips; the design language has remained largely unchanged since the brand's inception. The EOS series previously competed primarily with Nikon SLR cameras and, as of September 2025, competes primarily with Sony mirrorless cameras. The series was conceived as a camera system built around autofocus as a core feature. To that end, the EOS series was introduced alongside the electrically-driven and autofocus-centered EF lens mount, which replaced the previous mechanically-driven and primarily manual-focus FD lens mount. The EF mount and its variants were the primary lens mounts for EOS cameras for decades, eventually being replaced by the RF lens mount in 2018, which was designed for mirrorless cameras and has now become the standard lens mount for the series.

As the EOS series has evolved, the products have undergone frequent naming changes and component updates, including autofocus, exposure metering, and flash metering. The system has contributed to the popularity of autofocus cameras and the prevalence of video-recording features in consumer cameras, and has been used by numerous professional photographers and cinematographers.

== Naming ==
The naming conventions used for Canon EOS cameras largely follow two general rules: the fewer digits in a camera's model number, the higher-end the camera's market segment (e.g. the EOS 5D is a more expensive and powerful camera than the EOS 30D); and the smaller the model number within a given number of digits, the more powerful the camera (e.g. the EOS R1 is considered higher-end than the EOS R8). In addition, newer revisions of a given camera model are often given Mark designations, such as the EOS-1Ds Mark III. For mid-range and entry-level EOS DSLR cameras with two or more digits in the model number, the latter rule was different: the greater the model number within a given number of digits, the newer or higher-end the camera. These rules hold for most EOS cameras, with some major exceptions including the EOS 100D, 200D, and 250D, which occupied a different market segment than the other three-digit DSLR models; and all mirrorless cameras that utilized the EF-M lens mount, which did not follow any consistent naming scheme.

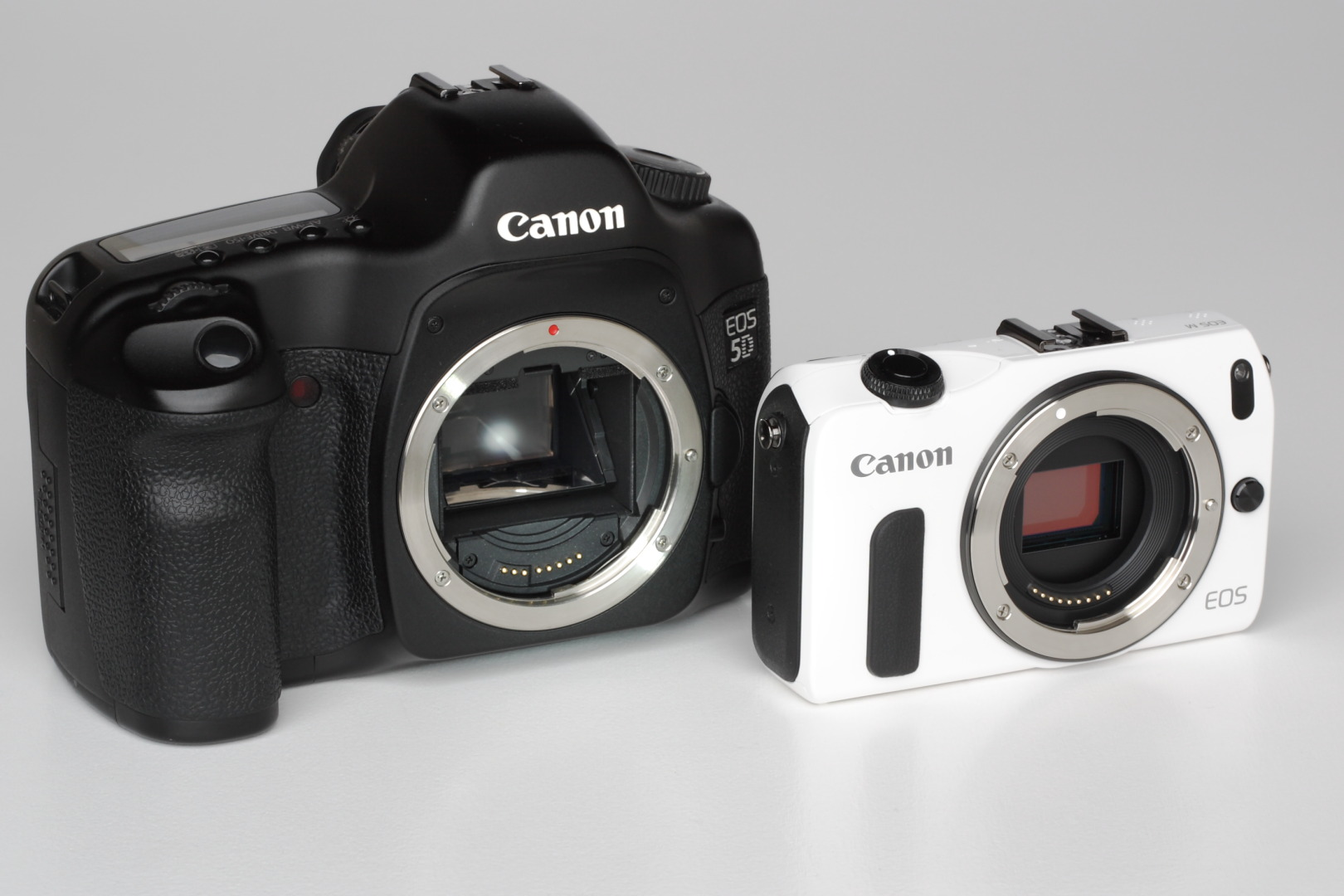
The EOS 5D, a high-end digital single-lens reflex camera, and the entry-level mirrorless EOS M

EOS camera model names often include prefixes and suffixes that detail important aspects of a camera, both general and specific. For example, EOS cameras with the prefix or suffix D are digital SLRs, cameras with the prefix M are mirrorless cameras that utilize the EF-M mount, and cameras with the prefix R are RF mount mirrorless cameras. Cameras modified for astrophotography, such as the Canon EOS 60Da, use the suffix a. Some EOS cameras, such as the EOS R5 C, have used the suffix C to mark the inclusion of Cinema EOS features or operating modes. The V suffix, intended to mark vlogging-oriented cameras, has been used for the EOS R50 V.

Beginning with the EOS 630/600 film SLR, some EOS cameras have been marketed under different names in different parts of the world. The most significant name changes occurred with the EOS 1000, marketed as the EOS Rebel in North America; and the EOS 500, marketed as the EOS Kiss in Japan and the EOS Rebel XS in North America. Starting with these two cameras in their respective markets, the majority of entry-level EOS film and digital SLRs have used the EOS Rebel brand in North America and the EOS Kiss brand in Japan, with the actual camera specifications being identical to their global counterparts. This practice ceased with the introduction of the EOS R50, the first entry-level EOS camera since the introduction of the Kiss and Rebel names to use the same name in all markets.

== Development ==
Canon first experimented with autofocus in 1985 with the T80, a single-lens reflex camera that utilized 135 film. The T80 featured Canon's existing FD lens mount, designed for manual focus, with the addition of electrical contacts that allowed communication between the camera body and focusing motors within the attached lens. This system, wherein the lens focuses itself using information from the camera body, was promising enough for Canon to continue development on a more refined version, despite Canon's internal dissatisfaction with the T80's autofocus performance when compared to Nikon and Minolta's autofocus cameras.

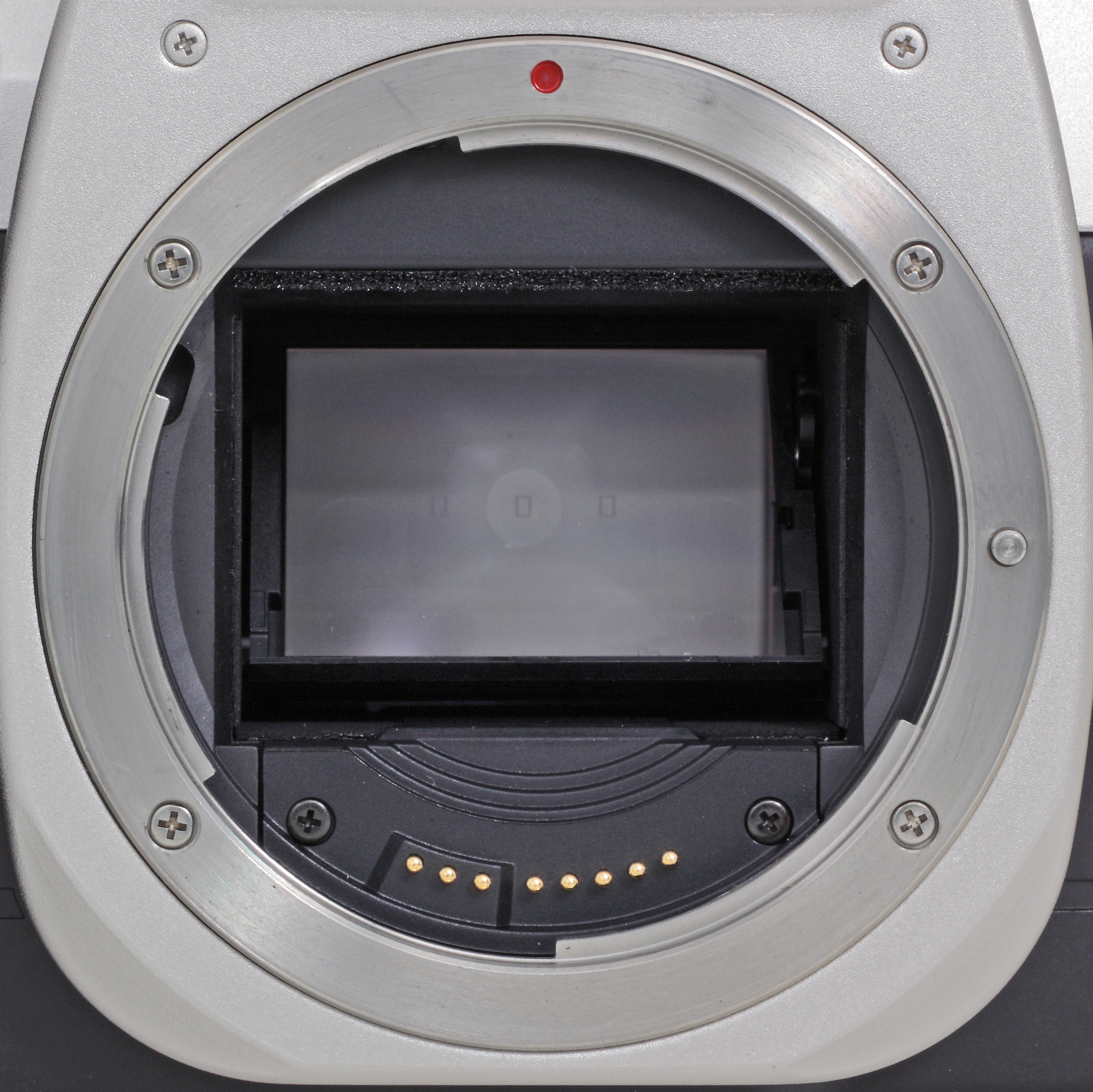
The Canon EF lens mount, showing the lack of mechanical linkages; the electrical pins below the sensor are used to communicate with and power the mounted lens.

Shortly after the release of the T80, Canon's camera team made the decision to create a new lens mount using recent advances in microelectronics. Unlike the FD lens mount, which was designed for manual-focus cameras with focusing motors in the camera body, this new lens mount would be fully electronic and would only support lenses with internal motors. This would both improve autofocus performance and allow more flexibility in pairing lenses and camera bodies. In a retrospective interview, Canon camera developer Yasuo Suda stated that the team "felt that the future of next-generation cameras hinged on the development of a new, fully-electronic mount."

== History ==
The EOS system was introduced in 1987 with the Canon EOS 650, a single-lens reflex camera that utilized 35 mm film. The camera broke compatibility with the FD lens mount by fully removing all mechanical linkages between the moving parts in the lens and in the camera: the correct aperture and focus are determined by the camera body and transmitted electronically to the lens, which makes the required adjustments using internal motors. Canon named this new lens mount the EF mount, short for "Electro-Focus". Alongside the bayonet-style lens mount, the EOS 650 featured a new focusing sensor and a microprocessor, and was paired with lenses with ultrasonic motors—the first instance of this technology being used for consumer photography. According to Popular Mechanics, the EOS 650 and the improved EOS 620 had the fastest autofocus performance of any camera available in the year they were released.

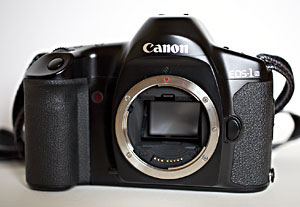
Canon EOS-1N high-end film autofocus camera (1994)

In 1989, Canon released the first EOS camera marketed to professionals, the EOS-1. The camera was intended to compete with the Nikon F4 released one year prior. The EOS-1 was released in tandem with new professional-grade lenses for the EF mount and established the EOS-1 series of cameras. In a 2019 interview, Canon principal engineer Toshio Matsumoto stated that "major principles for the EOS-1 series from the beginning have been durability, reliability, speed and control." The EOS-1 received two revisions, the EOS-1N and the EOS-1V. The EOS 1000 followed the EOS-1 in 1990; this became the EOS line's first successful budget SLR. The EOS 1000 was marketed as the EOS Rebel in North America, a name which continued to see use for the majority of entry-level Canon SLRs and DSLRs.

1992 saw the introduction of the EOS 5, a replacement for the EOS 10. This camera introduced Canon's Eye-Controlled Focus (ECF) system, which saw further adoption across other cameras in the EOS series at the time. Four years later, Canon released the EOS IX, an APS-format SLR. The EOS line of film cameras continued to be iterated upon until the release of the EOS 300X in 2004, which was the last film-based SLR designed by Canon. The last EOS film SLR to end production was the aforementioned EOS-1V, which released in 2000; the camera was actively manufactured until 2018, though it continued to see official repair service until late 2025.

=== Transition to digital ===
Prior to designing their own digital single-lens reflex cameras, Canon worked with Kodak to produce digital cameras in the EOS line, starting with the EOS DCS 3 in 1995. These cameras used a digital camera back with the image sensor and associated electronics designed and built by Kodak together with modified internals of the EOS-1N film SLR.

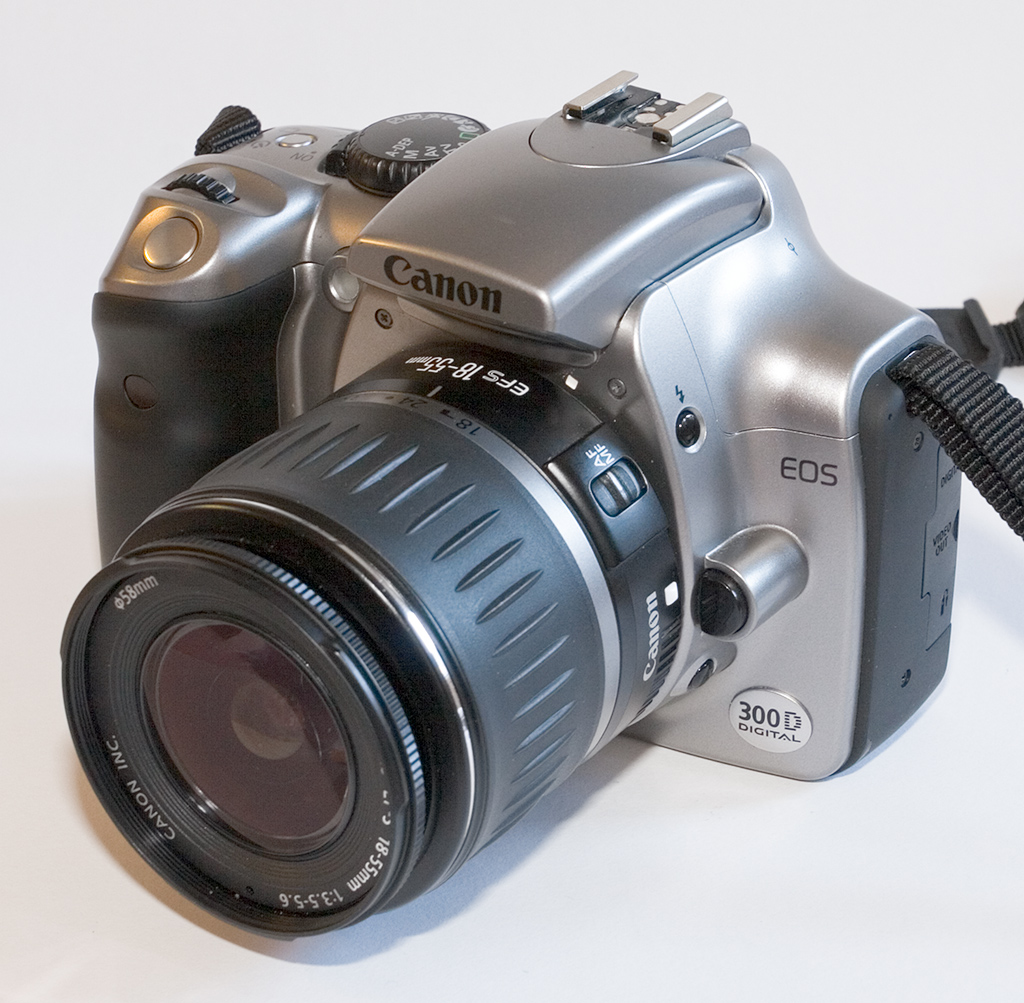
Canon EOS 300D digital SLR with EF-S 18-55 mm f/3.5-5.6 lens (2003)

The first digital EOS SLR camera wholly designed and manufactured by Canon was the EOS D30, released in 2000. While the majority of Canon's existing SLR lineup utilized 35 mm film, which would equate to a digital sensor with dimensions of 36×24 millimeters, the EOS D30 instead utilized the smaller APS-C sensor format with a 1.6× crop factor. Canon's use of CMOS technology to fabricate the sensor helped drive costs down, and the camera's listed launch price of US$3000 made it more accessible to consumers than competing CCD-sensor DSLRs from Nikon and Kodak.

In 2001, Canon followed up their entry into the DSLR market with the EOS-1D, a successor to their EOS-1 series of flagship professional film cameras. The EOS-1D was designed using the film-based EOS-1V (released one year prior) as a base, and utilized an externally manufactured CCD sensor, as Canon's own active-pixel sensors could not yet reach the readout speeds required for the camera's fast burst rate. The sensor had a 1.3× crop factor (APS-H): larger than the APS-C sensor used in the D30, but smaller than full-frame 35 mm. One year later, in 2002, Canon released the EOS-1Ds, the company's first DSLR to utilize a full-frame CMOS sensor. The camera's sensor featured 11 megapixels of effective resolution, much higher than competing cameras such as the Nikon D1X.

In order to produce more compact and lightweight lenses for digital cameras with APS-C sensors, Canon created the EF-S lens mount and introduced it in 2003 with the EOS 300D. EF-S lenses feature a smaller image circle and a shorter distance between the lens mount and image sensor than comparable EF lenses. The EOS 300D was Canon's first entry-level autofocus DSLR and one that competed against more expensive prosumer cameras due to sharing the same APS-C CMOS sensor as Canon's enthusiast-segment EOS 10D. The EOS 300D was the first Canon DSLR to use the Rebel brand in North America, being named the EOS Digital Rebel in those markets. When asked in 2024 what the most significant camera of the previous 25 years had been, Canon executive Go Tokura chose the EOS 300D.

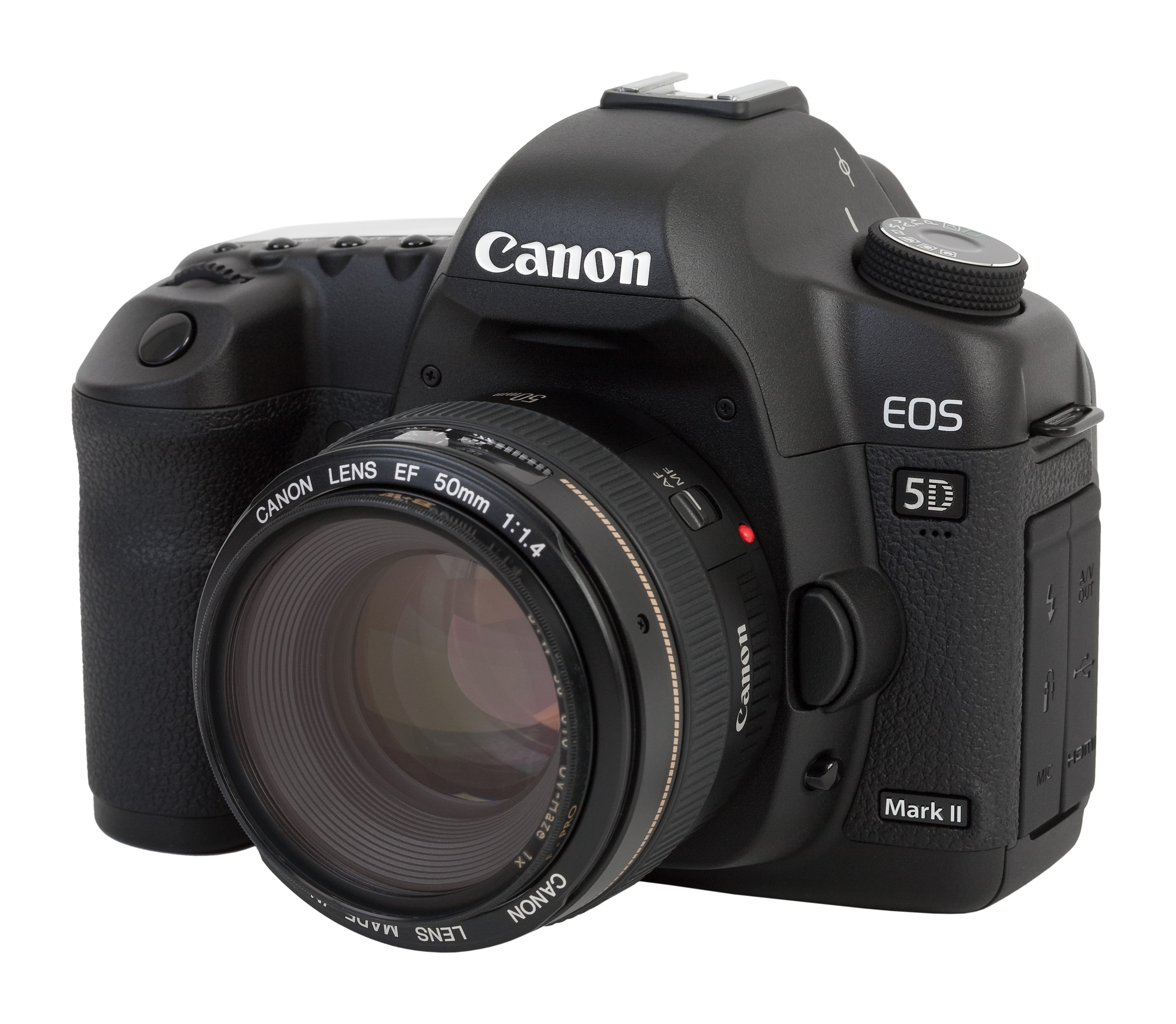
Canon EOS 5D Mark II digital SLR with EF 50 mm f/1.4 lens (2008)

In 2005 the Canon EOS 5D was announced. It offered a full-frame sensor comparable to that of the flagship EOS-1Ds Mark II within a body only slightly larger than that of the enthusiast-segment crop-frame EOS 20D. Canon continued to iterate on the EOS 5D in the following years. The EOS 5D Mark II was notable in that it was Canon's first EOS DSLR to offer video recording; it followed the Nikon D90, which was the first ever video-capable DSLR. However, unlike the D90, the 5D Mark II supported 1080p video recording. The ability to record high definition video led the 5D Mark II to find use in the cinema industry, both as a "crash camera" for action shots in films such as Iron Man 2 and as an A-camera in television shows such as House and Dexter. The final revision of the EOS 5D was the EOS 5D Mark IV, which released in 2016. Photographer Pete Souza used cameras in the EOS 5D series while working as the Chief Official White House Photographer for President of the United States Barack Obama.

Later in 2005, Canon released the EOS 20Da, an EOS camera specially designed for astrophotography. This variant of the EOS 20D featured two major changes: a modified infrared blocking filter in front of the sensor that allows greater sensor response for deep-red wavelengths, and a live preview mode for the rear LCD to allow more precise star tracking than could be accomplished with the viewfinder. In live preview mode, the camera's primary reflex mirror flips up into a locked position so that the primary image sensor is exposed directly to light, and the sensor continuously scans images to be viewed on the camera's integrated display. In single-lens reflex cameras, live preview allows numerous benefits such as exposure simulation and digital zoom for focus assistance. Live preview has since become nearly ubiquitous in interchangeable-lens camera models. Though the EOS 20Da was discontinued less than one year later without a direct successor planned, Canon eventually released one in the form of the Canon EOS 60Da seven years later.

After the release of the EOS 5D Mark II and its subsequent use in film and television, Canon expanded the EOS series to include digital movie cameras under the brand Cinema EOS. The first camera in this line was the EOS C300, released in 2011.

Until 2012, Canon had continued to release revisions of both the crop-frame EOS-1D and full-frame EOS-1Ds flagship DSLRs. That year saw the merging of these two product lines in the form of the EOS-1D X, which combined the full-frame sensor size of the EOS-1Ds Mark III and the fast burst speed of the EOS-1D Mark IV. The release of this camera marked the end of Canon's APS-H DSLR camera line, as full-frame image sensors no longer held a significant readout speed disadvantage when compared to smaller image sensors and the increased resolution of newer sensors could overcome the decreased telephoto reach of the full-frame sensor format. The EOS 1D X received two revisions, culminating with the Mark III, released in 2020. Photographer Sebastião Salgado used an EOS 1D X camera during an expedition in the Amazon basin.

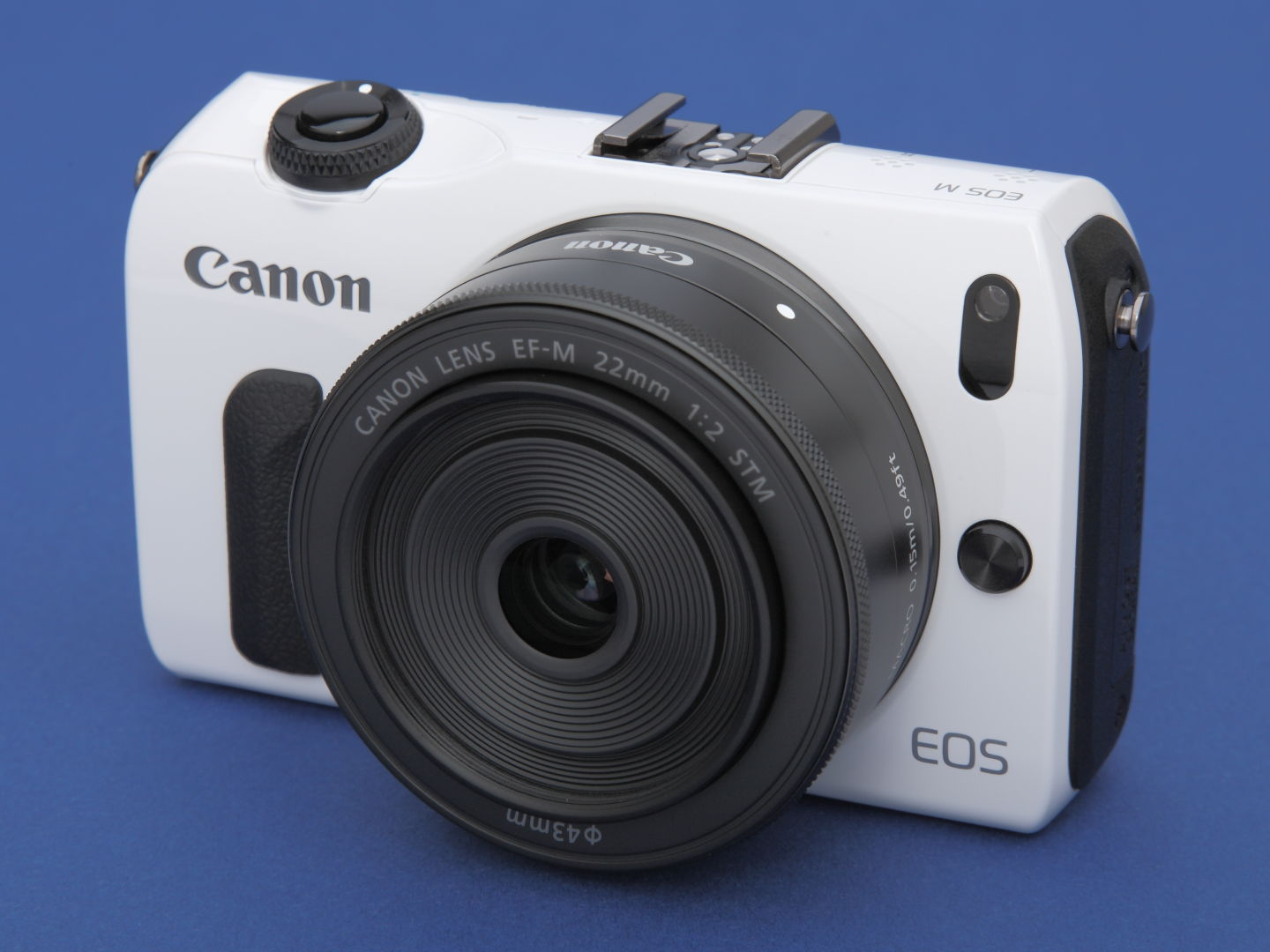
The EOS M, Canon's first EOS mirrorless camera (2012)

Additionally, 2012 saw the release of the EOS 650D, the first DSLR to feature a touchscreen interface and the first Canon DSLR to feature continuous autofocus in both live view and video mode. Canon introduced the entry-level APS-C EOS M shortly after, a derivative of the 650D and the first EOS mirrorless camera. Unlike DSLRs, which have optical viewfinders that use a mirror and prism system to show the view through the camera lens, mirrorless cameras tend to include an electronic viewfinder that works using the same principle as the live preview mode: the image seen through the viewfinder is scanned out directly by the image sensor. Through the elimination of the reflex mirror and optical viewfinder assembly, mirrorless cameras can thus be made smaller and lighter than comparable DSLRs. The EOS M also introduced the EF-M lens mount to take advantage of the shorter flange focal distance that could be achieved via the removal of the mirror system. Existing EF and EF-S lenses could be mounted using a separately-sold adapter.

Canon continued to release new DSLR camera models in the following years, alongside entry-level mirrorless cameras using the EF-M lens mount. The final EOS DSLR to be released was the midrange APS-C EOS 850D, launched in 2020. One year later, Canon confirmed that they would no longer be releasing new digital SLR camera models as they pivoted fully to mirrorless technology. As of October 2025, Canon continues to manufacture some EOS DSLR cameras, with the EOS 2000D and 5D Mark IV absent from the company's list of discontinued products.

=== Transition to mirrorless ===
The most advanced camera that utilized the EF-M mount was the midrange APS-C Canon EOS M5, which was released in 2016. The EOS M5 was Canon's first mirrorless camera to feature an integrated electronic viewfinder. It featured the same 24.1 megapixel sensor as its EOS DSLR equivalent, the EOS 80D, and was claimed to provide image quality equal to or greater than that of the 80D. News outlets such as The Verge and CNET considered the EOS M5 to be Canon's first serious attempt at a mirrorless EOS camera.

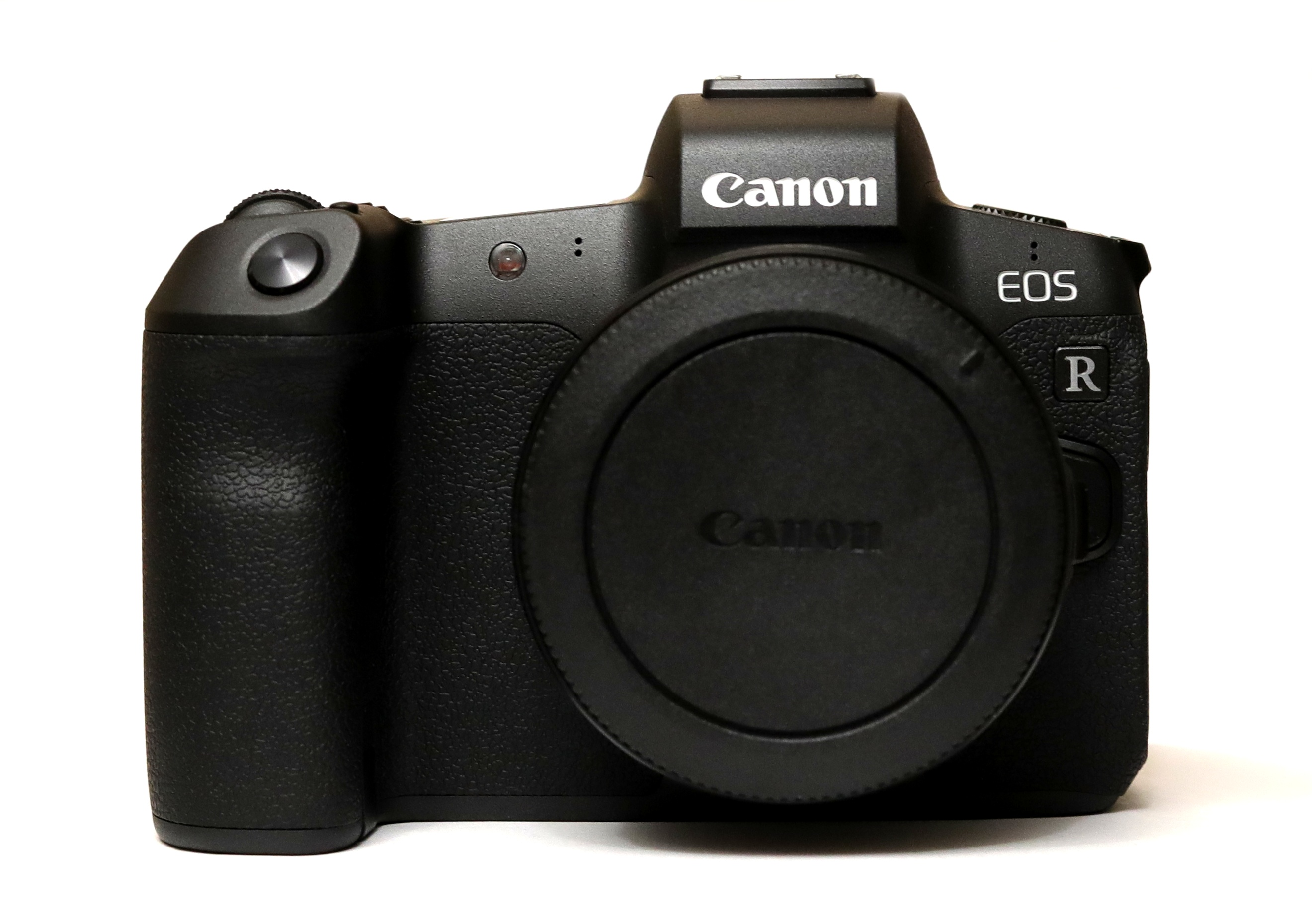
The Canon EOS R, the first full-frame mirrorless camera in the EOS series (2018)

By 2018, Canon was under significant pressure to release a full-frame mirrorless camera—Sony had released the Sony A7 and A7R five years prior. That year, Canon introduced the RF mount, a lens mount designed for full-frame mirrorless cameras. The RF mount retains the 54 mm inner diameter of the EF mount while increasing the number of connective electrical pins from 8 to 12 and reducing flange focal distance to 20 mm from the EF mount's 44 mm. These changes allow for more advanced and compact lens designs than could be achieved with the EF mount, though this comes at the cost of compatibility with EF mount lenses. To address this, Canon released an optic-free adapter for the RF mount that allows usage of EF and EF-S lenses, though the shorter flange focal distance of the EF-M mount meant that EF-M lenses could not be adapted for use with the RF system.

The first RF mount camera was the EOS R, Canon's first full-frame mirrorless camera. According to camera designer Hironori Oishi, Canon's goal with the EOS R was "to carry on the traditional parts of EOS but then bring in new innovation at the same time," which resulted in a camera with ergonomics similar to existing EOS DSLRs but with modified and simplified controls. The camera garnered somewhat negative reception with Photography Life criticizing the camera's poor handling and lack of available lenses and Digital Photography Review assessing the camera's specifications as being behind comparable mirrorless cameras from Sony and Nikon. A smaller and lighter derivative, the EOS RP, released in 2019.

In 2020, Canon released the full-frame EOS R5 and EOS R6, mirrorless successors to the EOS 5D and EOS 6D series respectively. Compared to the EOS R, both featured a new autofocus system, a new image processor, in-body image stabilization, and much greater shutter durability, among other improvements. In an interview, Oishi stated that the team "valued the handling and operability developed in the EOS 5D series, and aimed to design something that would feel natural to users" when designing the EOS R5. The R5 was received well by Digital Photography Review, who called the camera "one of the best cameras on the market." Both cameras have received revisions, with the EOS R5 Mark II announced in 2024 (which resolved an overheating issue with the original camera) and the EOS R6 Mark III announced in 2025.

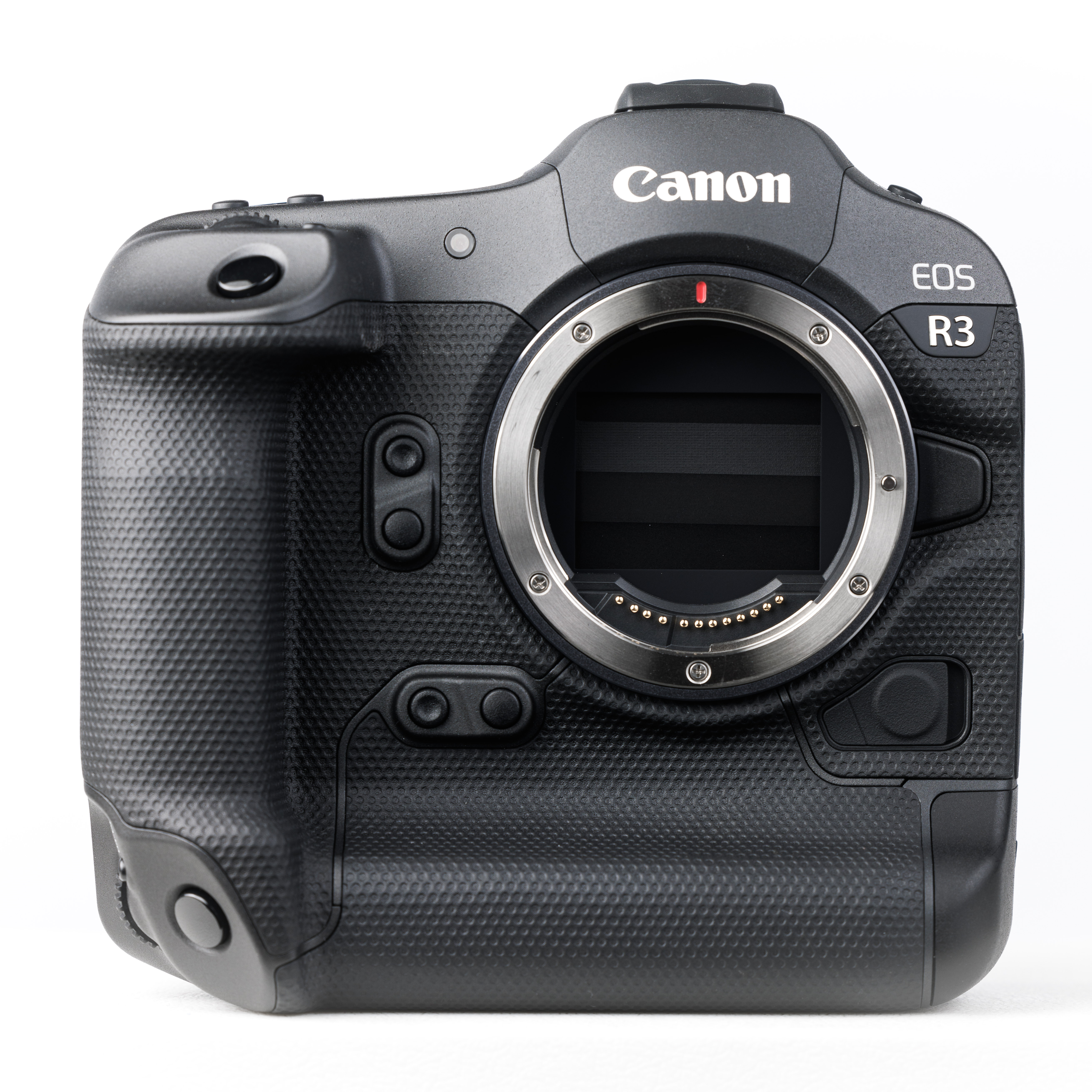
The Canon EOS R3, a high-end full-frame mirrorless camera released in 2021

One year later, Canon released the EOS R3, a professional-grade full-frame camera with Canon's first stacked CMOS sensor in an EOS camera. Such sensors include signal processing circuitry and memory on the sensor die, greatly increasing image readout speeds and reducing the effects of rolling shutter when compared to conventional CMOS sensors. The R3 featured a vertical grip and large body similar to Canon's flagship EOS-1D Mark III DSLR released one year prior, but with a smaller and lighter body. The fast image readout speeds provided by the camera's sensor, along with other features such as its HDR-capable viewfinder and eye-controlled focus, led the EOS R3 to receive positive reviews for its wildlife and sports photography capabilities from PCMag.

In 2022, Canon released the first APS-C cameras to use the RF mount, the midrange EOS R10 and the enthusiast-grade EOS R7. These served as successors to the EOS 850D and EOS 7D Mark II DSLRs respectively. Both cameras featured the same image processor and subject-detection autofocus system as Canon's high-end EOS mirrorless cameras such as the EOS R5 and R3. Compared to the cheaper EOS R10, the EOS R7 featured in-body image stabilization and weather sealing, though it lacked the EOS R10's in-body flash. Alongside these cameras, Canon introduced new "RF-S" lenses designed for APS-C RF mount cameras. These lenses have a smaller image circle with APS-C sensor coverage, allowing them to be lighter and more compact, but utilize the same RF mount as existing RF lenses. Unlike EF-S lenses, which required an adapter to be used with EF mount cameras, RF-S lenses can be used on full-frame RF mount cameras; the camera body automatically crops the frame to only use an APS-C sized portion of the sensor.

Until this point, Canon had supported both the EOS M system and the EOS R system of mirrorless cameras; however, with the release of the entry-level RF mount EOS R50 and R100 mirrorless cameras in 2023, Canon officially discontinued the EOS M system camera models and lenses.

In 2024, Canon released its first flagship mirrorless camera, the full-frame EOS R1. Targeted towards sports photography, the EOS R1 featured many improvements over the EOS R3: faster image readout speeds, improved image stabilization and eye-tracking autofocus, raw video recording, a supplementary processor to further improve autofocus subject tracking, and improved durability. The EOS R1 received critical acclaim from photography reviewers such as Digital Camera World and Amateur Photographer.

The following year, Canon introduced the first EOS V series camera, the EOS R50 V. Intended as a vlogging-focused variant of the EOS R50, the R50 V omits the electronic viewfinder and built-in flash of the EOS R50 and gains improved connectivity and video recording capabilities. The EOS R6 V, a video-focused variant of the EOS R6 Mark III featuring active fan cooling, was announced in 2026.

== Autofocus ==
All Canon EOS cameras are autofocus-capable. The first EOS camera, the EOS 650, contained Canon's first implementation of phase-detection autofocus in a single-lens reflex camera. In phase-detection systems, incoming light from the camera lens is split into two beams by the primary mirror; one travels towards the viewfinder, and another travels to a digital image sensor with one or more sensitive areas. The data collected by the sensor is processed to determine how far the focal point must be moved, and in what direction, to achieve correct focus. The EOS 650's autofocus system only contained one horizontally-oriented autofocus point; future EOS cameras contained more points with other orientations. Before the replacement of traditional phase-detection autofocus in the EOS series, top-line EOS cameras had either 61 or 65 user-selectable autofocus points.

The addition of live preview and video recording to the series created new challenges. As both features require the primary mirror of the camera to be folded such that the image sensor is always exposed to light from the lens, the secondary image sensor used for phase detection receives no light and cannot be used to achieve focus. To resolve this issue, Canon introduced a contrast-detection autofocus system—wherein the primary image sensor utilizes the hill climbing method to find the focus distance with peak contrast and thus correct focus—specifically for these modes. This was later refined with the introduction of Canon's proprietary Hybrid CMOS AF system, which utilized phase-detection pixels within the primary image sensor to perform coarse focus-finding, followed by contrast detection hill-climbing to refine focus. In both cases, secondary-sensor phase-detection was still used for viewfinder-based still photography. Subsequent iterations of Hybrid CMOS AF increased frame coverage and focus accuracy.

With the EOS 70D, Canon integrated phase-detection autofocus into the primary sensor with the proprietary Dual Pixel CMOS AF system. In this system, each pixel in the focus area on the primary sensor is split into two photodiodes that can be read independently for autofocus and simultaneously for capture, which allows high autofocus frame coverage with no penalty to image quality. The introduction of DPAF brought autofocus performance during live preview and video mode in line with secondary-sensor phase detection autofocus methods and provided a robust autofocus method for Canon's then-emerging EOS mirrorless cameras. Dual Pixel CMOS AF II, introduced with the mirrorless EOS R5 and R6, increased autofocus frame coverage from 80% to nearly 100%.

=== Eye-controlled focusing ===
Through the tracking of eyeball movements, EOS cameras equipped with eye-controlled focusing (ECF) are able to select the desired autofocus point in the scene based on where the user is looking in the viewfinder frame. ECF is especially useful in sports photography where the subject may shift its position in the frame rapidly.

The EOS 5, EOS 50E, EOS IXe, EOS-3, and EOS 30 film SLRs all featured an ECF system. The EOS 30V was the last EOS SLR to have the feature. Due to issues with accuracy and usability, Canon did not continue development of its eye-controlled focusing system for EOS digital SLRs. However, the feature eventually returned with the release of the mirrorless EOS R3 in 2021, where the camera's increased autofocus frame coverage and ability to show the eye's focus point on the electronic viewfinder made the feature viable to include. Canon has continued to add this functionality to new high-end EOS cameras such as the EOS R1 and R5 Mark II.

== Flash system ==
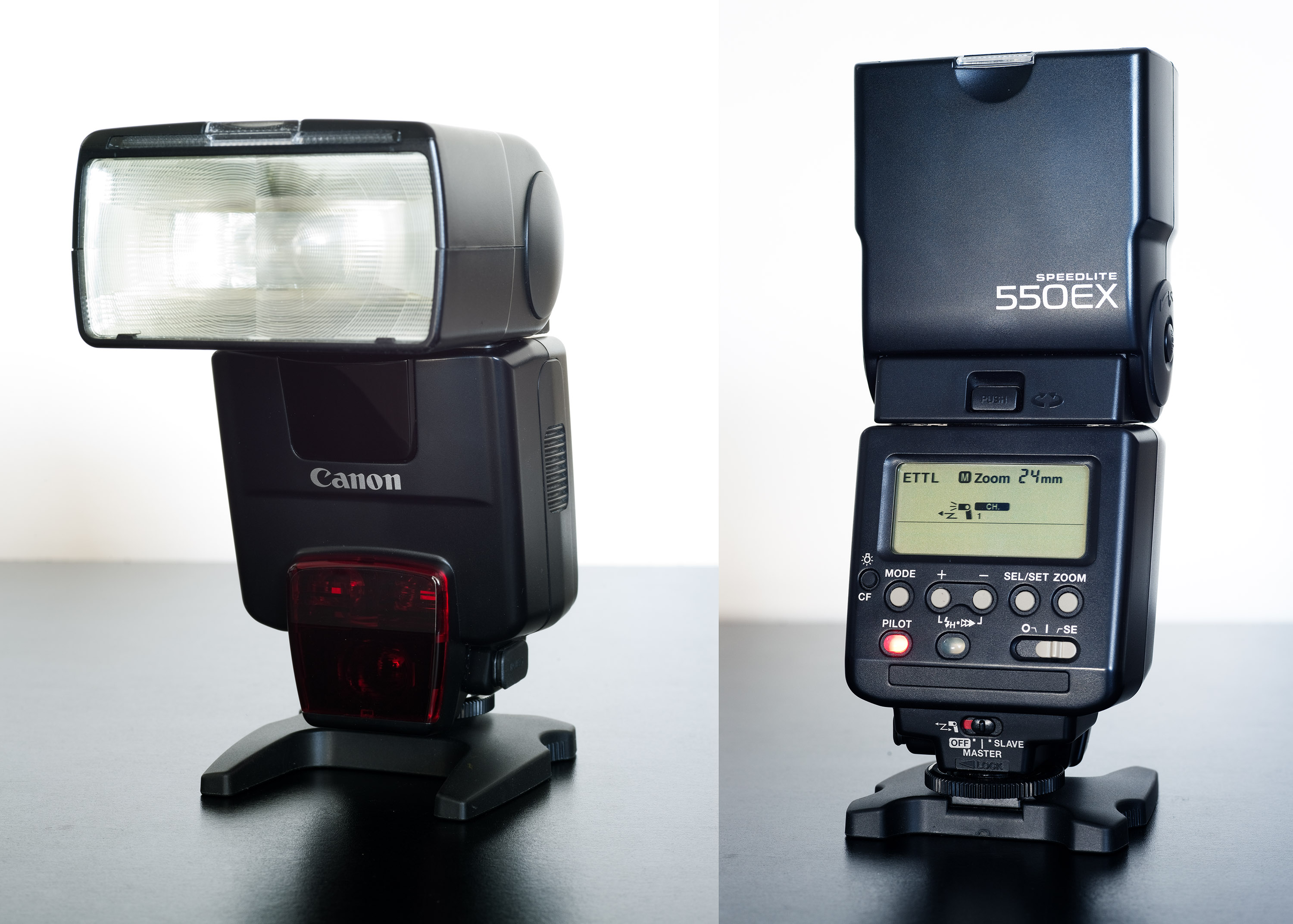
A Speedlite 550EX, an early E-TTL flash from 1998

When initially released, EOS cameras supported two flash metering systems, named TTL (for through-the-lens) and A-TTL (Advanced TTL). The former fires the primary flash only as long as is required to achieve sufficient exposure as determined by flash sensors inside the camera's body, while the latter utilizes an additional low-power flash to aid in adjusting the camera's aperture for proper exposure. All EOS film cameras supported A-TTL metering. A new metering system named E-TTL (Evaluative TTL) was introduced in 1995; this system allowed correct exposure to be achieved without requiring active monitoring of the flash's output. E-TTL II, which was an enhancement in the camera's firmware only, replaced E-TTL from 2004.

Canon Speedlite-brand flashes have evolved alongside the cameras. The EZ series of Speedlite models, which was introduced alongside the first EOS cameras, supported both TTL and A-TTL metering; the release of E-TTL metering on EOS cameras prompted the release of the E-TTL compatible Speedlite EX series. Canon also produces Speedlite accessories, including the OC-E3 Off-Camera Shoe Cord, which can be used to hand-hold the flash while allowing the camera to control it through the cord.

== See also ==
- Canon Cinema EOS, a series of EOS cameras designed primarily for video production
- List of Canon products
- Sony α
- Panasonic Lumix

Class	1987	1988	1989	1990	1991	1992	1993	1994	1995	1996	1997	1998	1999	2000	2001	2002	2003	2004	2005	2006	2007	…	2018
Professional				1					1N					1V									
Professional				RT					1N RS														
High-end				10			5						3										
Advanced		620		600		100				50					30				30V				
Midrange	650				1000F	1000F N		500			500N			300			300V		300X				
Entry-level		750	850	700					5000				3000			3000N		3000V					
Entry-level											IX												
Entry-level												IX 7											

Type	Sensor	Class	00	01	02	03	04	05	06	07	08	09	10	11	12	13	14	15	16	17	18	19	20	21	22	23	24	25	26
DSLR	Full-frame	Flagship				1Ds		1Ds Mk II			1Ds Mk III					1D C													
DSLR	Full-frame	Flagship				1Ds		1Ds Mk II			1Ds Mk III				1D X					1D X Mk II ^{T}			1D X Mk III ^{T}						
DSLR	APS-H	Flagship			1D			1D Mk II	1D Mk II N		1D Mk III		1D Mk IV																
DSLR	Full-frame	Professional																	5DS / 5DS R										
DSLR	Full-frame	Professional							5D			_{x} 5D Mk II			_{x} 5D Mk III					5D Mk IV ^{T}									
DSLR	Full-frame	Advanced														_{x} 6D					_{x} 6D Mk II ^{AT}								
DSLR	APS-C	Advanced											_{x} 7D					_{x} 7D Mk II											
DSLR	APS-C	Mid-range						20Da								_{x} 60Da ^{A}													
DSLR	APS-C	Mid-range		D30	D60	10D		20D	30D		40D	_{x} 50D		_{x} 60D ^{A}			_{x} 70D ^{AT}		80D ^{AT}				90D ^{AT}						
DSLR	APS-C	Mid-range																	760D ^{AT}		77D ^{AT}								
DSLR	APS-C	Entry-level					300D	350D		400D	450D	_{x} 500D	_{x} 550D	_{x} 600D ^{A}		_{x} 650D ^{AT}	_{x} 700D ^{AT}		_{x} 750D ^{AT}		800D ^{AT}			850D ^{AT}					
DSLR	APS-C	Entry-level															_{x} 100D ^{T}		_{x} 200D ^{AT}				250D ^{AT}						
DSLR	APS-C	Entry-level										1000D		_{x} 1100D			_{x} 1200D			1300D		2000D							
DSLR	APS-C	Value																				4000D							
Early models			Canon EOS DCS 5 (1995); Canon EOS DCS 3 (1995); Canon EOS DCS 1 (1995); Canon EOS D2000 (1998); Canon EOS D6000 (1998)																										
Type	Sensor	Spec																											
Type	Sensor	Spec	00	01	02	03	04	05	06	07	08	09	10	11	12	13	14	15	16	17	18	19	20	21	22	23	24	25	26

Sensor	Class	12	13	14	15	16	17	18	19	20	21	22	23	24	25	26
Full-frame	Flagship														_{m} R1 ^{ATS}	
Full-frame	Professional											_{m} R3 ^{ATS}				
Full-frame	Professional										R5 ^{ATSR}				_{m} R5 Mk II ^{ATSR}	
Full-frame	Professional											_{m} R5 C ^{ATCR}				
Full-frame	Advanced										R6 ^{ATS}		_{m} R6 Mk II ^{ATS}			_{m} R6 Mk III ^{ATS}
Full-frame	Advanced															R6 V ^{ATS}
Full-frame	Advanced									Ra ^{AT}						
Full-frame	Advanced								R ^{AT}							
Full-frame	Midrange													_{m} R8 ^{AT}		_{m} R8 Mk II ^{ATS}
Full-frame	Entry/mid								RP ^{AT}							
APS-C	Advanced												_{m} R7 ^{ATS}			
APS-C	Midrange						M5 ^{FT}						_{m} R10 ^{AT}			
APS-C	Entry/mid		_{x} M ^{T}	M2 ^{T}	M3 ^{FT}			M6 ^{FT}		M6 Mk II ^{FT}						
APS-C	Entry/mid								M50 ^{AT}		M50 Mk II ^{AT}			_{m} R50 ^{AT}		
APS-C	Entry/mid															_{m} R50 V ^{AT}
APS-C	Entry					M10 ^{FT}		M100 ^{FT}		M200 ^{FT}				R100		
Sensor	Class															
Sensor	Class	12	13	14	15	16	17	18	19	20	21	22	23	24	25	26
