= Canon EOS 5000 =

1995 35mm single-lens reflex camera

Overview
- Maker: Canon Inc.
- Type: 35mm SLR

Lens
- Lens mount: Canon EF lens mount

Focusing
- Focus: TTL Phase Detection Autofocus (3 zone)

Exposure/metering
- Exposure metering: Multiple autoexposure modes 6 zone evaluative metering

Flash
- Flash: Built-in flash and A-TTL flash metering with shoe mounted flash

Shutter
- Frame rate: 1 frame/s
- Shutter: Vertical-travel focal plane shutter, 1/8 sec. – 1/2000 sec., B. X-sync at 1/90 sec.

General
- Dimensions: 145×92×70 mm (5.7×3.6×2.8 in), 340g

The Canon EOS 5000 (sold in Asian countries as the EOS 888) is an entry-level 35mm autofocus single-lens reflex camera marketed by Canon in January 1995. The camera was introduced as a low-end camera for the European market, and was not sold in Japan or the Americas.

Unlike most Canon EOS cameras, the EOS 5000 is primarily controlled by a single dial on the top of the camera. The camera offers five fully automatic exposure modes, as well as shutter-priority autoexposure. No manual aperture control is provided.

Along with renamed versions for different markets, a QD version which could print the date or time the photograph was taken was available. It was replaced in the market by the EOS 3000 in 1999.
