= Canon EOS Rebel XS =

Canon EOS Rebel XS may refer to:

- Canon EOS 500, film SLR camera known as the Rebel XS Kiss in North America.
- Canon EOS 1000D, digital SLR camera known as the Rebel XS Kiss F in North America
