= Canon EOS 500 =

1993 35mm single-lens reflex camera

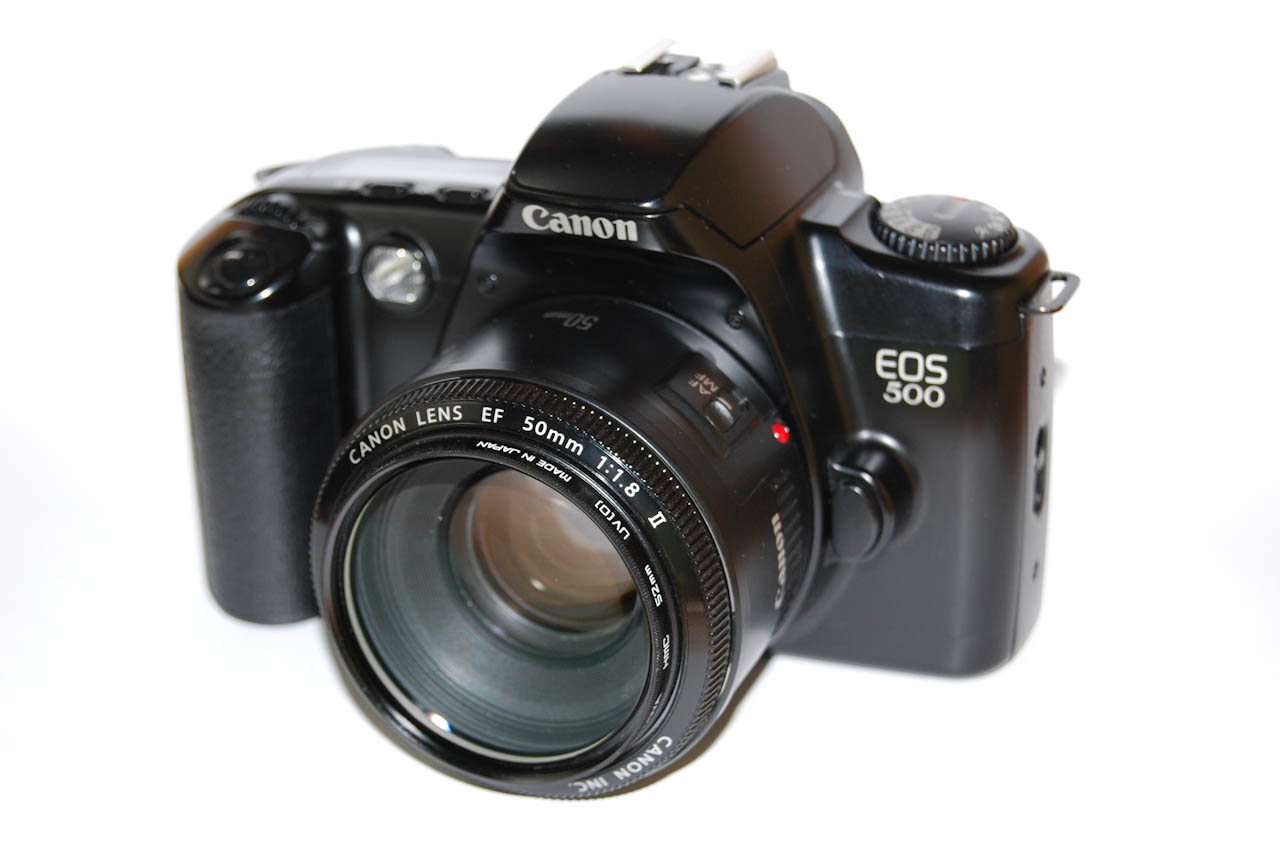

Overview
- Maker: Canon Inc.
- Type: 35 mm SLR
- Released: September 1993
- Intro price: JPY 59,000 (body only)

Lens
- Lens mount: Canon EF lens mount

Sensor/medium
- Film format: 35mm
- Film speed: ISO 6 - 6400
- Film speed detection: DX coding

Focusing
- Focus: TTL Phase Detection Autofocus

Exposure/metering
- Exposure: Composite SPC for TTL full-aperture metering (6-zone evaluative, 9.5% partial at center, and centerweighted averaging)

Flash
- Flash: Built-in flash

Shutter
- Frame rate: 3 fps
- Shutter speeds: 30s - 1/2000s

General
- Battery: 2x CR123A
- Dimensions: 145×92×62 mm (5.7×3.6×2.4 in), 370 g
- Weight: 370 g (13 oz)

Chronology
- Predecessor: Canon EOS 1000FN
- Successor: Canon EOS 500N

The Canon EOS 500 (EOS Kiss in Japan, EOS Rebel XS in North America) is a consumer-level 135 film single-lens reflex camera, produced by Canon of Japan from September 1993 until 1996 as part of their EOS system. It replaced the earlier EOS 1000FN and sat in the lower portion of the EOS range, it was superseded by the EOS 500N.

Class	1987	1988	1989	1990	1991	1992	1993	1994	1995	1996	1997	1998	1999	2000	2001	2002	2003	2004	2005	2006	2007	…	2018
Professional				1					1N					1V									
Professional				RT					1N RS														
High-end				10			5						3										
Advanced		620		600		100				50					30				30V				
Midrange	650				1000F	1000F N		500			500N			300			300V		300X				
Entry-level		750	850	700					5000				3000			3000N		3000V					
Entry-level											IX												
Entry-level												IX 7											
