= Canon EOS R10 =

2022 APS-C mirrorless camera

Overview
- Maker: Canon Inc.
- Type: Mirrorless
- Released: 28 July 2022; 3 years ago
- Intro price: US$979.99 (body only); US$1099 (with RF-S 18-45mm f/4.5-6.3 IS STM); US$1379 (with RF-S 18-150mm f/3.5-6.3 IS STM)

Lens
- Lens mount: Canon RF
- Lens: Interchangeable

Sensor/medium
- Sensor type: CMOS
- Sensor size: APS-C (22.3 × 14.9 mm)
- Maximum resolution: 6000 × 4000 pixels (24.2 effective megapixels)
- Film speed: ISO 100 – 32,000; expandable to 51,200
- Recording medium: 1× SDXC UHS-II compatible

Focusing
- Focus: Dual Pixel CMOS AF II
- Focus modes: One Shot; Servo; Auto Switch (only in A+ mode); Manual
- Focus areas: 651 zones / 4503 positions (photo); 527 zones / 3713 positions (video)

Flash
- Flash: Hot shoe, built-in

Shutter
- Frame rate: 15 fps (mechanical); 23 fps (electronic)
- Shutter: Electronically-controlled focal-plane shutter; Electronic first-curtain; Electronic rolling shutter
- Shutter speeds: 30s – 1/4000s (mechanical); 30s – 1/16000s (electronic)

Viewfinder
- Electronic viewfinder: 1024×768 (2.36-million dot) OLED
- Viewfinder magnification: 0.95×
- Frame coverage: 100%

Image processing
- Image processor: DIGIC X

General
- Video recording: 4K UHD at up to 29.97 fps (59.94 fps with crop), 1080p at up to 119.88 fps
- LCD screen: 7.5 cm (3.0 in) 720×480 touchscreen, fully articulating, live preview
- Battery: LP-E17
- AV port: HDMI Type-D
- Data port(s): USB 2.0 Type-C, Wi-Fi 4 (2.4 GHz), Bluetooth 4.2
- Dimensions: 122.5×87.8×83.4 mm (4.82×3.46×3.28 in)
- Weight: 426 g (15.0 oz) (incl. battery and memory card)
- Latest firmware: 1.7.0 / 3 July 2025; 12 months ago
- Made in: Japan

Chronology
- Predecessor: Canon EOS 90D and 850D (DSLRs); Canon EOS M5 (EF-M mirrorless)

The Canon EOS R10 is a mirrorless interchangeable lens camera produced by Canon. It was announced on May 24, 2022, alongside the Canon EOS R7, and was released in Japan on July 28, 2022. The camera serves as an RF-mount successor to both the midrange EOS 90D and upper-entry-level EOS 850D DSLRs.

== Features ==
The Canon EOS R10 builds on the enhancements provided by the Canon EOS 850D and incorporates new capabilities while maintaining a compact size similar to that of the EOS 250D/Rebel SL3. The R10 has been described as the successor to the Rebel line and uses the same LP-E17 battery as many Rebel DSLRs and M series cameras. The battery delivers 350 shots on a single charge using the LCD touchscreen and 210 shots using the viewfinder.

The R10 has a 24.2-megapixel APS-C-format CMOS sensor, a quick and accurate autofocus system, and supports continuous shooting of up to 15 fps with the mechanical shutter and up to 23 fps with the electronic shutter. It provides the pre-shooting function. It can record 4K/60 fps video, with a 1.56× crop, and supports HDR PQ video recording. It also offers a native ISO range of 100 to 32,000, which is expandable to 51,200. The R10 has a 0.39" 2.36 million dots OLED electronic viewfinder with a selectable refresh rate of 60/120fps and a vari-angle LCD touchscreen display. Additionally, it has a UHS-II SD memory card slot, built-in Wi-Fi and Bluetooth connectivity, and incorporates Canon's DIGIC X image processor.

== Reception ==
Digital Photography Review gave the R10 an 87% overall score, earning the website's Silver Award. Engadget concluded that the R10 had excellent burst speeds and autofocus, good image and video quality but was not as big of an improvement over the Sony α6400 as they were expecting. PCMag concluded that the R10's price and capabilities placed it towards the mid-range market, with it being a sensible upgrade for users of the Rebel series or the Canon EOS 90D. Wirecutter concluded that the R10 was a solid APS-C body that's light and small but due to the lack of lens options on the RF mount they did not recommend it over the Olympus OM-D E-M10 Mark IV.

BCN+R sales data shows that the R10 has been the top selling camera in Japan for years since its release.

== Problems ==
In April 2023, Canon of Japan announced a recall of EOS R10 units with serial numbers starting with 01, 02, and 03. Affected units were found to produce a loud noise when firing the camera's built-in flash.

== Third-party lenses ==
The EOS R10 was announced alongside the EOS R7 as the first crop-sensor cameras to feature Canon's RF lens mount. Initially, Canon provided a limited selection of first-party RF lenses designed for these cameras, with third-party lenses unavailable due to Canon's restrictions. However, on April 22, 2024, Sigma and Tamron announced that they had been licensed by Canon to make third-party lenses for its APS-C RF mount cameras like the R10. The next day, Digital Camera World reported that these would be "the first [third-party] autofocus RF lenses that Canon has allowed to remain on the market."

== Photo gallery ==
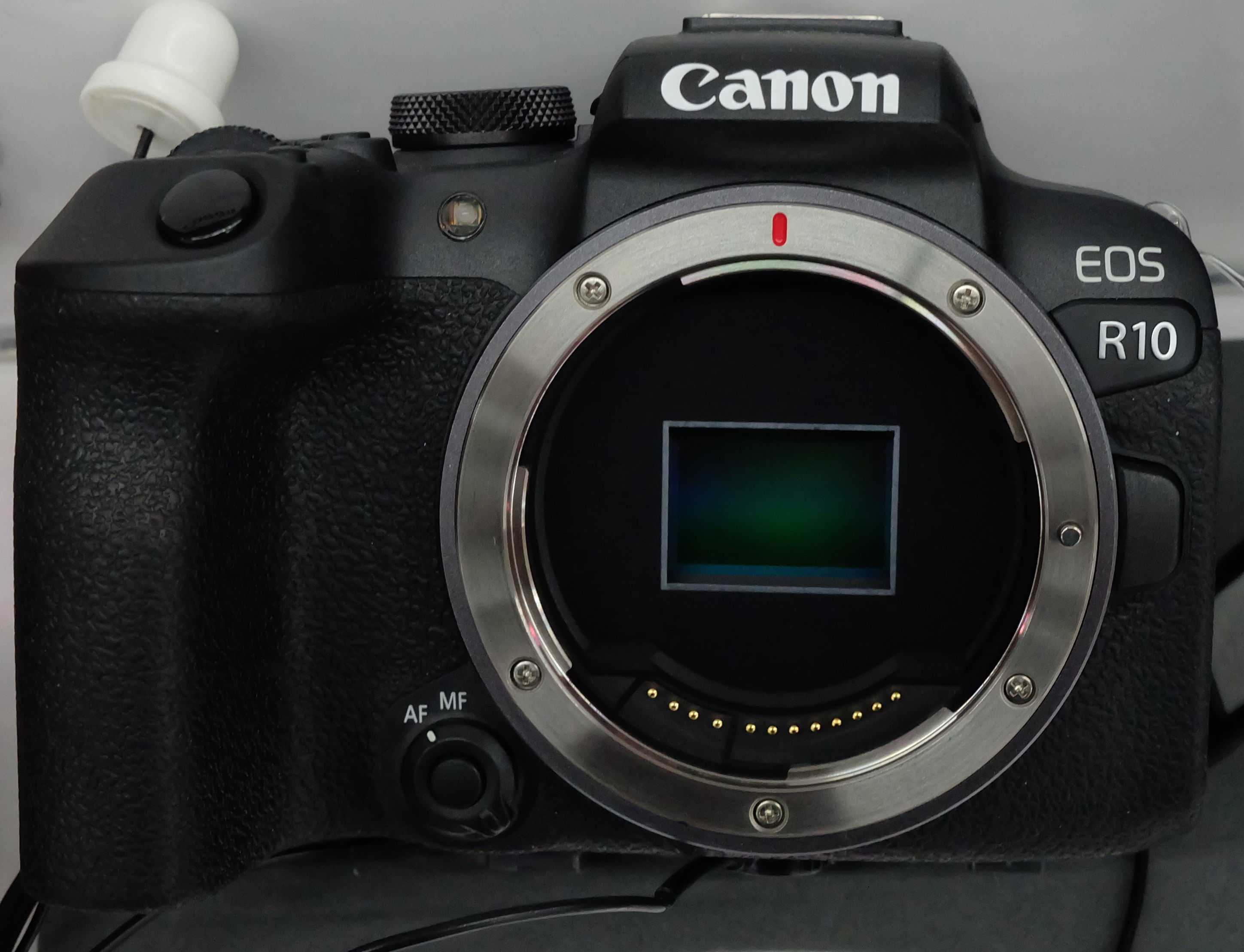

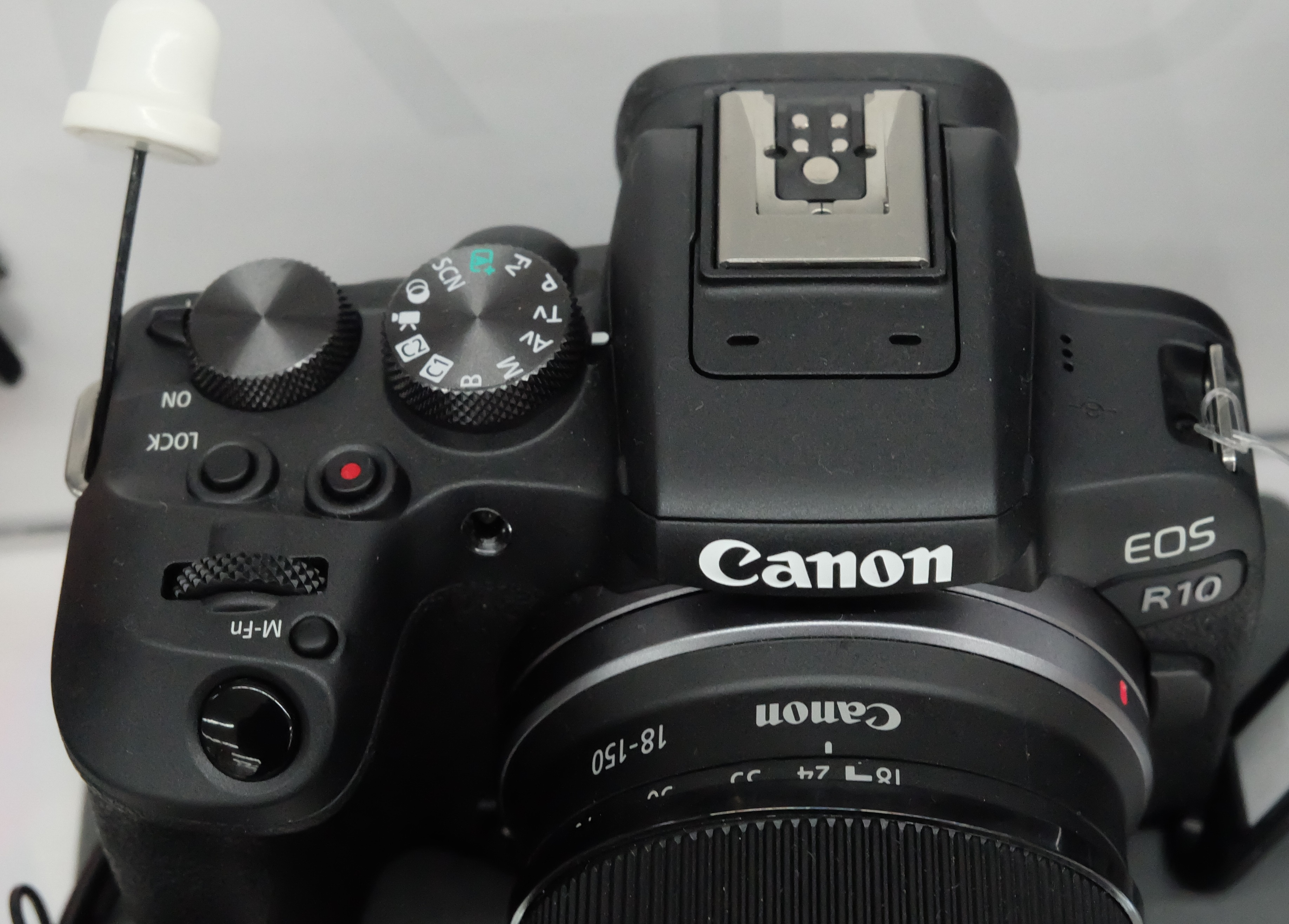

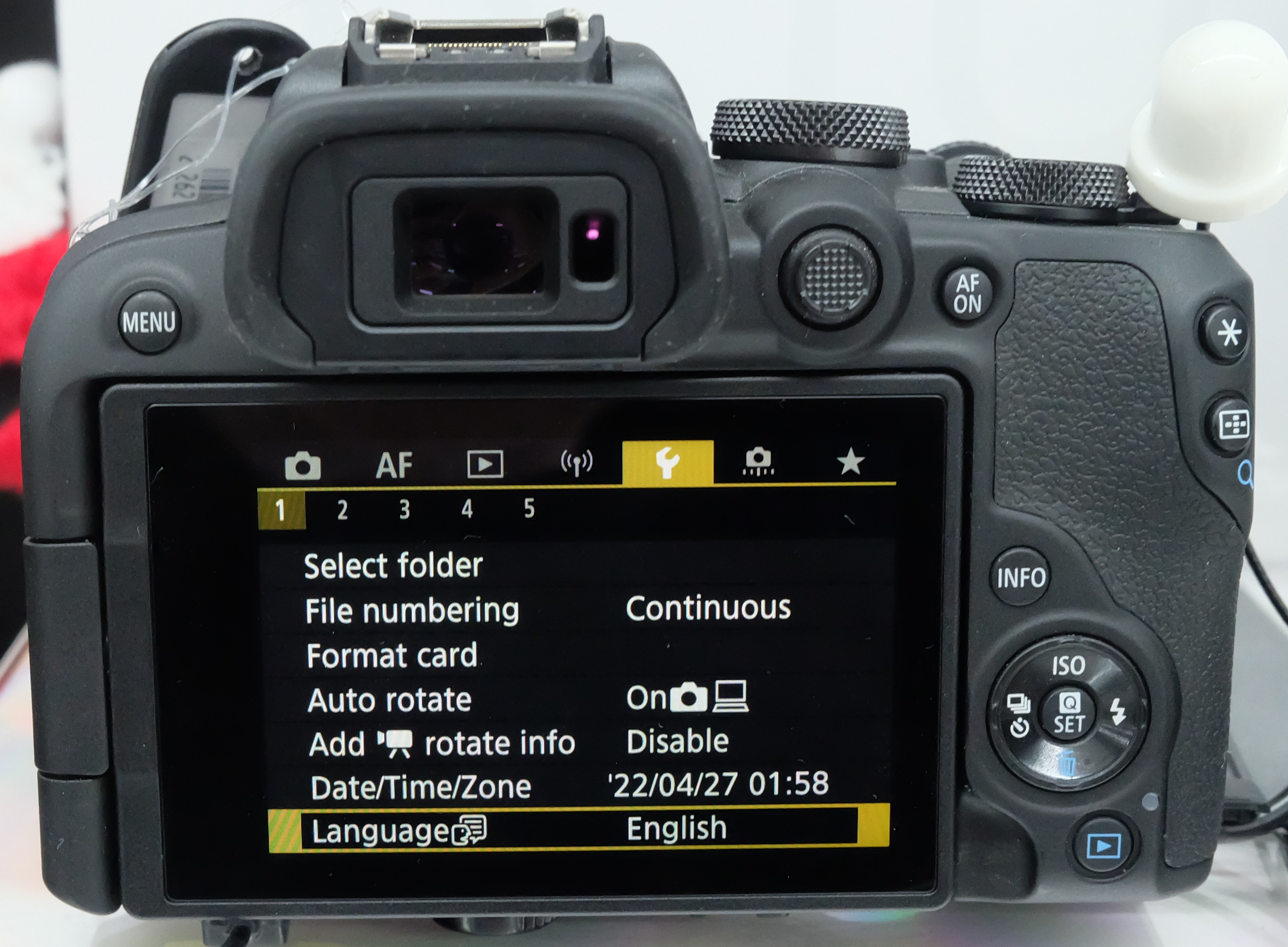

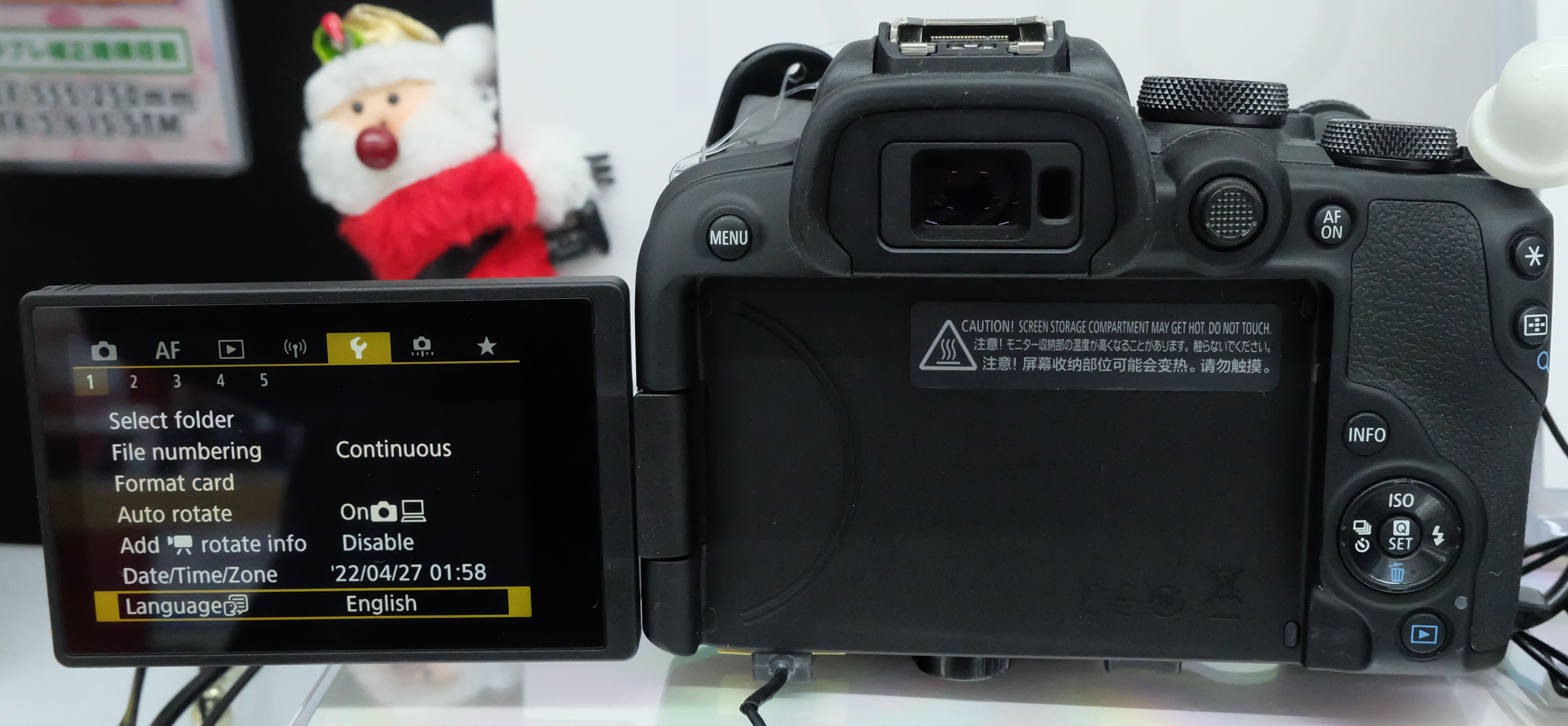

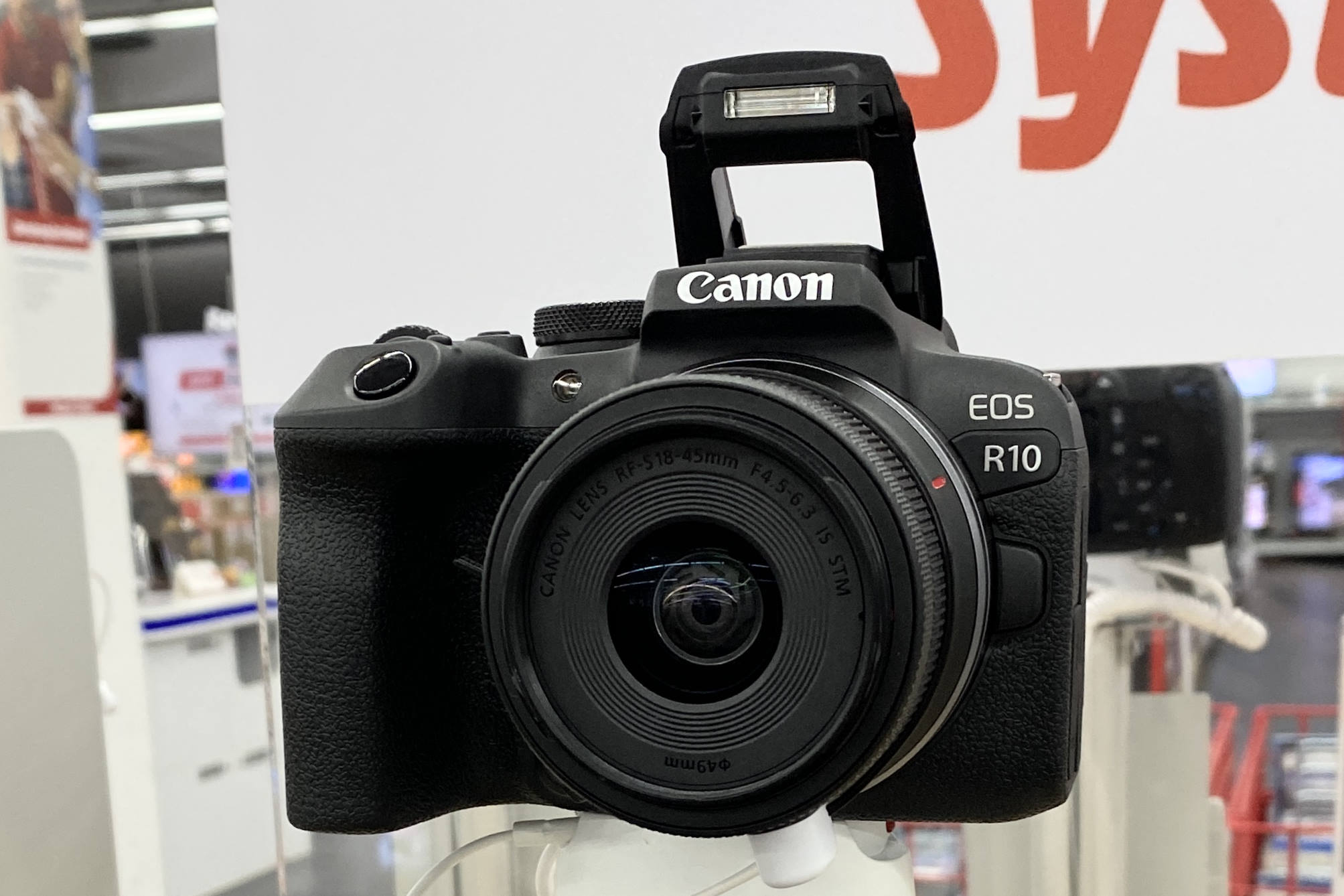

== See also ==
other Canon APS-C mirrorless cameras from the same period:

- Canon EOS R7
- Canon EOS R50
- Canon EOS R100

| Sensor | Class | 12 | 13 | 14 | 15 | 16 | 17 | 18 | 19 | 20 | 21 | 22 | 23 | 24 | 25 | 26 |
|---|---|---|---|---|---|---|---|---|---|---|---|---|---|---|---|---|
| Full-frame | Flagship | | | | | | | | | | | | | | _{m} R1 ^{ATS} | |
| Full-frame | Professional | | | | | | | | | | | _{m} R3 ^{ATS} | | | | |
| Full-frame | Professional | | | | | | | | | | R5 ^{ATSR} | | | | _{m} R5 Mk II ^{ATSR} | |
| Full-frame | Professional | | | | | | | | | | | _{m} R5 C ^{ATCR} | | | | |
| Full-frame | Advanced | | | | | | | | | | R6 ^{ATS} | | _{m} R6 Mk II ^{ATS} | | | _{m} R6 Mk III ^{ATS} |
| Full-frame | Advanced | | | | | | | | | | | | | | | R6 V ^{ATS} |
| Full-frame | Advanced | | | | | | | | | Ra ^{AT} | | | | | | |
| Full-frame | Advanced | | | | | | | | R ^{AT} | | | | | | | |
| Full-frame | Midrange | | | | | | | | | | | | | _{m} R8 ^{AT} | | |
| Full-frame | Entry/mid | | | | | | | | RP ^{AT} | | | | | | | |
| APS-C | Advanced | | | | | | | | | | | | _{m} R7 ^{ATS} | | | |
| APS-C | Midrange | | | | | | M5 ^{FT} | | | | | | _{m} R10 ^{AT} | | | |
| APS-C | Entry/mid | | _{x} M ^{T} | M2 ^{T} | M3 ^{FT} | | | M6 ^{FT} | | M6 Mk II ^{FT} | | | | | | |
| APS-C | Entry/mid | | | | | | | | M50 ^{AT} | | M50 Mk II ^{AT} | | | _{m} R50 ^{AT} | | |
| APS-C | Entry/mid | | | | | | | | | | | | | | | _{m} R50 V ^{AT} |
| APS-C | Entry | | | | | M10 ^{FT} | | M100 ^{FT} | | M200 ^{FT} | | | | R100 | | |
| Sensor | Class | | | | | | | | | | | | | | | |
| Sensor | Class | 12 | 13 | 14 | 15 | 16 | 17 | 18 | 19 | 20 | 21 | 22 | 23 | 24 | 25 | 26 |
