= Canon EOS R50 =

2023 APS-C mirrorless camera

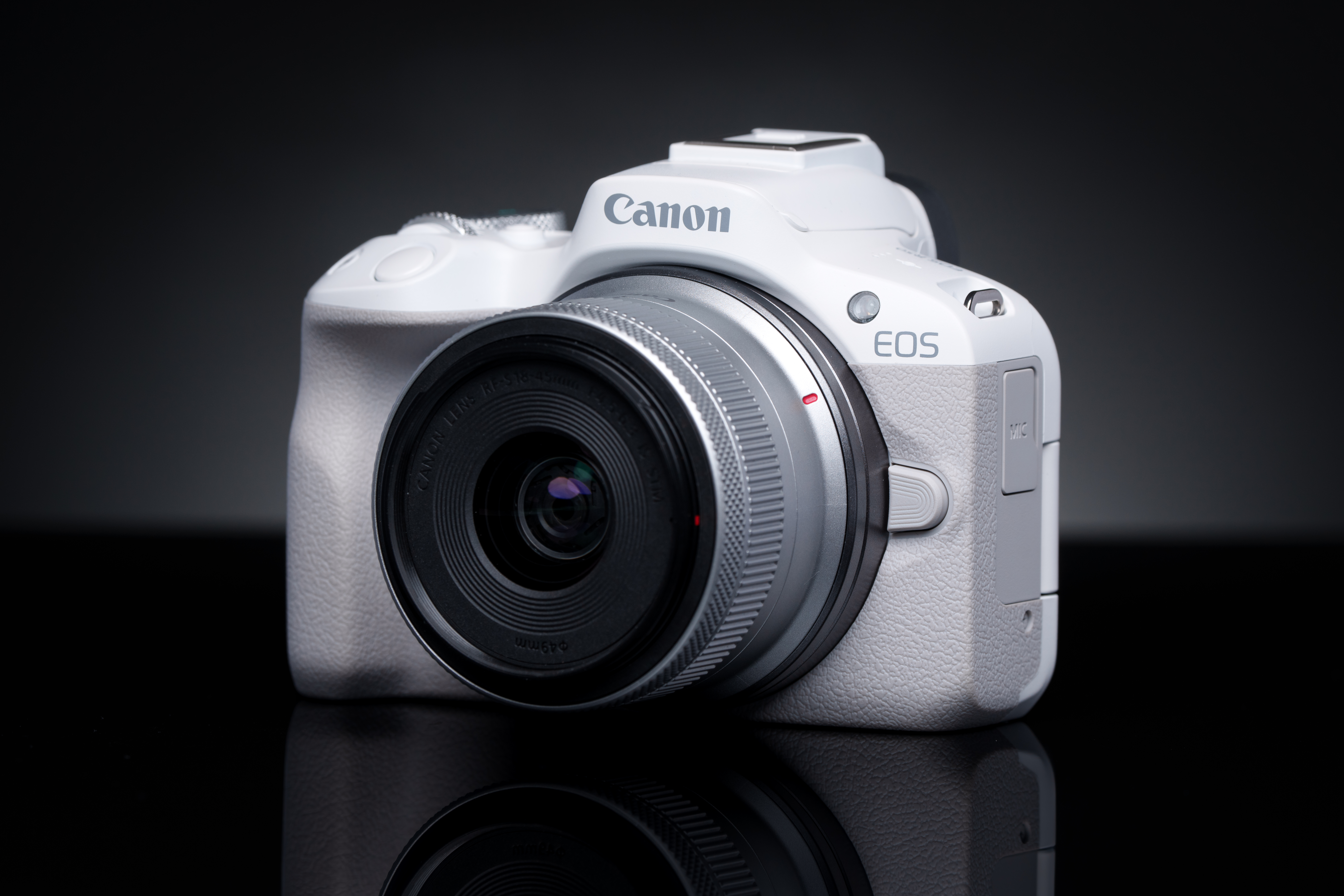
- White Canon EOS R50 with 18-45mm kit lens

Overview
- Maker: Canon Inc.
- Type: Mirrorless
- Released: 18 April 2023; 3 years ago
- Intro price: US$680 (body only); US$800 (with RF-S 18-45mm f/4.5-6.3 IS STM); US$1029 (with RF-S 18-45mm f/4.5-6.3 IS STM and RF-S 55-210mm f/5-7.1 IS STM)

Lens
- Lens mount: Canon RF
- Lens: Interchangeable

Sensor/medium
- Sensor type: CMOS
- Sensor size: APS-C (22.3×14.9 mm)
- Maximum resolution: 6000×4000 pixels (24 megapixels)
- Film speed: ISO 100 – 32,000; expandable to 51,200
- Recording medium: 1× SDXC UHS-I compatible

Focusing
- Focus: Dual Pixel CMOS AF II
- Focus modes: One Shot; Servo AF; Auto Switch (only in A+ mode); Manual
- Focus areas: 651 zones / 4503 positions (photo); 527 zones / 3713 positions (video)

Flash
- Flash: Hot shoe, built-in
- Flash exposure compensation: ± 3 stops in 1/3-stop increments (external flash), ± 2 stops in 1/3-stop increments (built-in flash)
- Flash synchronization: 1/250s (electronic first curtain shutter)

Shutter
- Frame rate: 12 fps (electronic first curtain shutter); 15 fps (electronic shutter)
- Shutter: Electronic first-curtain Electronic
- Shutter speeds: 30s – 1/4000s (electronic first curtain); 30s – 1/8000s (electronic)

Viewfinder
- Electronic viewfinder: 1.0 cm (0.39 in) 1086×724 OLED
- Viewfinder magnification: 0.95×
- Frame coverage: 100%

Image processing
- Image processor: DIGIC X
- WB bracketing: ± 3 levels in single-level increments

General
- Video recording: 4K UHD at up to 29.97 fps, 1080p at up to 119.88 fps
- LCD screen: 7.5 cm (3.0 in) 900×600 touchscreen, fully articulating, live preview
- Battery: LP-E17
- AV port: HDMI Type-D
- Data port(s): USB 2.0 Type-C, Wi-Fi 4 (2.4 GHz), Bluetooth 4.2
- Dimensions: 116×86×69 mm (4.6×3.4×2.7 in)
- Weight: 328 g (11.6 oz) (body only); 375 g (13.2 oz) (including battery and memory card)
- Latest firmware: 1.5.0 / 3 March 2026; 5 months ago
- Made in: Taiwan

Chronology
- Replaced: Canon EOS 250D (DSLR); Canon EOS M50 Mark II (EF-M mirrorless)

References
- "Canon EOS R50 Camera Specifications". Canon Europe. Archived from the original on 2025-01-19.

The Canon EOS R50 is an entry-level APS-C mirrorless interchangeable-lens camera produced by Canon. It was announced on 8 February 2023 alongside the full-frame Canon EOS R8. The camera serves as an RF-mount replacement for Canon's discontinued EOS M50 Mark II and EOS 250D.

== Design ==
The Canon EOS R50 follows the design principles of the EOS M50 Mark II and EOS 250D compact interchangeable lens cameras, primarily their compact and lightweight construction, while incorporating the newer RF lens mount system and other features from previously released EOS R series cameras. The camera fits the internals of Canon's previously released EOS R10 into a form factor better suited for vlogging and travel.

== Features ==
The R50 includes many features from the more expensive EOS R10, including its 24.2-megapixel APS-C CMOS sensor, DIGIC X processor, Dual Pixel CMOS AF II focus system, and 2.36-million-dot OLED electronic viewfinder, though the physical controls have been simplified to fit the R50's role as a camera for beginner photographers. Additionally, features such as a fully mechanical shutter, sensor self-cleaning, and in-body image stabilization were not included, though the R50 can utilize in-lens stabilization.

The R50 includes a fully-articulating 1.62-million-dot LCD touchscreen along with its electronic viewfinder, a built-in stereo microphone and a 3.5mm audio jack for use with an external microphone, a UHS-I capable SD card slot, and built-in Wi-Fi and Bluetooth connectivity. It is capable of burst shooting at a framerate of 12 fps with a buffer up to 42 JPEG images when using the electronic first curtain shutter and 15 fps with a buffer up to 37 images when using the electronic shutter. It is capable of shutter speeds from as fast as 1/8000 seconds to as slow as 30 seconds. When recording video, the R50 is capable of up to 4K UHD resolution oversampled from the full sensor width at up to 29.97 fps while also supporting slow motion 1080p recording at up to 120 fps. Its DIGIC X processor enables multiple modes of subject detection, up to 651 autofocus zones and 4503 autofocus points, and in-camera focus bracketing.

== Reception ==
The EOS R50 received generally positive reviews upon its launch. Engadget awarded the R50 a score of 87/100 and found it to be "a good balance between power and affordability". Digital Photography Review gave the camera a score of 84%, noting its high-quality photo and video capture and its "impressive" autofocus system while deducting points for a lack of available RF-mount APS-C lenses.

Some reviewers were more critical in their reception of the R50, chiefly due to ergonomics and controls. TechRadar gave the camera 3.5 stars and described it as "affordable, but limited" due to its lack of physical controls when compared to the EOS R10. PCMag came to a similar conclusion in its review, where it also gave the R50 3.5 stars and noted that the small size of the camera made it difficult to hold comfortably.

== Variants ==
On 26 March 2025, Canon announced the EOS R50 V, a vlogging-focused variant of the R50. The R50 V loses the R50's built-in flash and electronic viewfinder, but gains improved video recording capabilities, improved wired and wireless connectivity, and more video-focused physical and digital controls, especially the capability to shoot in Canon Log Clog3.

== See also ==
- List of lightest mirrorless cameras

other Canon APS-C mirrorless cameras from the same period:

- Canon EOS R7
- Canon EOS R10
- Canon EOS R50 V
- Canon EOS R100

Sensor	Class	12	13	14	15	16	17	18	19	20	21	22	23	24	25	26
Full-frame	Flagship														_{m} R1 ^{ATS}	
Full-frame	Professional											_{m} R3 ^{ATS}				
Full-frame	Professional										R5 ^{ATSR}				_{m} R5 Mk II ^{ATSR}	
Full-frame	Professional											_{m} R5 C ^{ATCR}				
Full-frame	Advanced										R6 ^{ATS}		_{m} R6 Mk II ^{ATS}			_{m} R6 Mk III ^{ATS}
Full-frame	Advanced															R6 V ^{ATS}
Full-frame	Advanced									Ra ^{AT}						
Full-frame	Advanced								R ^{AT}							
Full-frame	Midrange													_{m} R8 ^{AT}		_{m} R8 Mk II ^{ATS}
Full-frame	Entry/mid								RP ^{AT}							
APS-C	Advanced												_{m} R7 ^{ATS}			
APS-C	Midrange						M5 ^{FT}						_{m} R10 ^{AT}			
APS-C	Entry/mid		_{x} M ^{T}	M2 ^{T}	M3 ^{FT}			M6 ^{FT}		M6 Mk II ^{FT}						
APS-C	Entry/mid								M50 ^{AT}		M50 Mk II ^{AT}			_{m} R50 ^{AT}		
APS-C	Entry/mid															_{m} R50 V ^{AT}
APS-C	Entry					M10 ^{FT}		M100 ^{FT}		M200 ^{FT}				R100		
Sensor	Class															
Sensor	Class	12	13	14	15	16	17	18	19	20	21	22	23	24	25	26
