= Canon EOS R50 V =

2025 APS-C mirrorless camera

Overview
- Maker: Canon Inc.
- Type: Mirrorless interchangeable lens camera
- Released: Announced March 26, 2025
- Intro price: $649 (body only) $849 (with RF-S 14-30mm f4.6 PZ lens)

Lens
- Lens mount: Canon RF

Sensor/medium
- Sensor: APS-C (22.3 x 14.9 mm)
- Sensor type: CMOS
- Maximum resolution: 6000 x 4000 (24 MP)
- Image processor: DIGIC X

General
- Video recording: 4K resolution (29.97 fps)
- Battery: LP-E17; USB-PD rechargeable
- Made in: Japan

The Canon EOS R50 V is an entry-level video-oriented APS-C mirrorless interchangeable-lens camera. Announced on March 26, 2025 and launched in April 2025, this variant of the Canon EOS R50 is Canon's first RF body designed for vlogging creators.

== Features ==
- 24MP Dual Pixel AF CMOS sensor
- APS-C RF mount
- 4K video capture
- a second tripod socket for vertical shooting
- a tally lamp
- no viewfinder
- support for four livestreaming methods and Cinema EOS presets

Sensor	Class	12	13	14	15	16	17	18	19	20	21	22	23	24	25	26
Full-frame	Flagship														_{m} R1 ^{ATS}	
Full-frame	Professional											_{m} R3 ^{ATS}				
Full-frame	Professional										R5 ^{ATSR}				_{m} R5 Mk II ^{ATSR}	
Full-frame	Professional											_{m} R5 C ^{ATCR}				
Full-frame	Advanced										R6 ^{ATS}		_{m} R6 Mk II ^{ATS}			_{m} R6 Mk III ^{ATS}
Full-frame	Advanced															R6 V ^{ATS}
Full-frame	Advanced									Ra ^{AT}						
Full-frame	Advanced								R ^{AT}							
Full-frame	Midrange													_{m} R8 ^{AT}		
Full-frame	Entry/mid								RP ^{AT}							
APS-C	Advanced												_{m} R7 ^{ATS}			
APS-C	Midrange						M5 ^{FT}						_{m} R10 ^{AT}			
APS-C	Entry/mid		_{x} M ^{T}	M2 ^{T}	M3 ^{FT}			M6 ^{FT}		M6 Mk II ^{FT}						
APS-C	Entry/mid								M50 ^{AT}		M50 Mk II ^{AT}			_{m} R50 ^{AT}		
APS-C	Entry/mid															_{m} R50 V ^{AT}
APS-C	Entry					M10 ^{FT}		M100 ^{FT}		M200 ^{FT}				R100		
Sensor	Class															
Sensor	Class	12	13	14	15	16	17	18	19	20	21	22	23	24	25	26
