= Canon EOS 850D =

2020 APS-C digital single-lens reflex camera

Canon EOS 850D Canon EOS Rebel T8i Canon EOS Kiss X10i
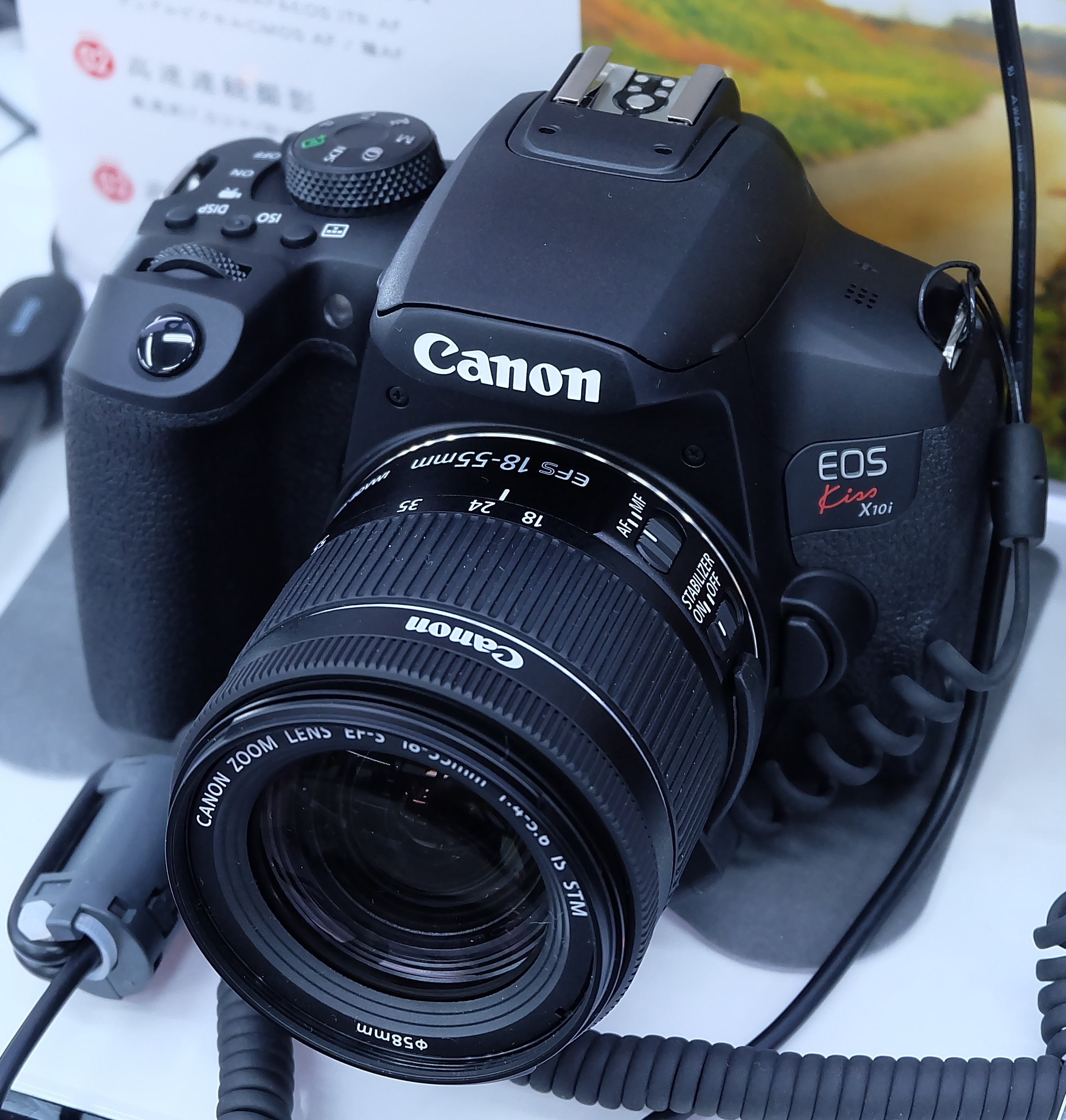

Overview
- Type: Digital single-lens reflex camera
- Intro price: US$750

Lens
- Lens mount: Canon EF
- Lens: Interchangeable (EF / EF-S)

Sensor/medium
- Sensor type: CMOS
- Sensor size: 22.3 × 14.9 mm (APS-C format)
- Maximum resolution: 6000 × 4000 pixels (3.72 μm pixel size) (approx. 24.1 effective megapixels)
- Film speed: 100–25600 (expandable to H: 51200)
- Storage media: SD/SDHC/SDXC card (UHS-I bus supported)

Focusing
- Focus modes: One-Shot, AI Focus, AI Servo, Live View (FlexiZone - Multi, FlexiZone - Single, Face detection, Movie Servo)
- Focus areas: 45 cross-type AF points
- Focus bracketing: N/A

Exposure/metering
- Exposure modes: Scene Intelligent Auto, Flash Off, Creative Auto, Special Scene (Group Photo Kids, Food, Candlelight, Night Portrait, Handheld Night Scene, HDR Backlight Control, Portrait, Landscape, Close-up, Sports), Creative Filters, Program AE, Shutter priority AE, Aperture priority AE, Manual exposure, Movie
- Exposure metering: TTL, full aperture, 216-zone sensor with 220,000-pixel RGB + IR sensor
- Metering modes: Evaluative, Partial, Spot, Centre-weighted Average

Flash
- Flash: E-TTL II auto-pop-up built-in / External
- Flash bracketing: N/A

Shutter
- Shutter: Electronic focal-plane
- Shutter speed range: 1/4000 s – 30 s, Bulb; X-sync at 1/200 s
- Continuous shooting: Up to 7 fps (7.5 fps in Live view mode)

Viewfinder
- Viewfinder: Optical pentamirror with 95% coverage and 0.82× magnification / LiveView LCD

Image processing
- Image processor: DIGIC 8
- White balance: Auto, Daylight, Shade, Cloudy, Tungsten, White Fluorescent, Flash, Custom
- WB bracketing: Yes

General
- LCD screen: 3.0" (7.7 cm) Clear View II colour TFT vari-angle LCD touchscreen with 1,040,000 dots
- Battery: Li-Ion LP-E17 rechargeable (1800 mAh); 800 shots (CIPA rating)
- Dimensions: 131.0 × 102.6 × 76.2 mm (5.16 × 4.04 × 3.00″) (W × H × D)
- Weight: 471 g (16.6 oz) (body only)
- Made in: Japan

Chronology
- Predecessor: Canon EOS 800D
- Successor: Canon EOS R10 (mirrorless)

The Canon EOS 850D, known in the Americas as the EOS Rebel T8i and in Japan as the EOS Kiss X10i, is a digital single-lens reflex camera announced by Canon on February 12, 2020. It is Canon's last APS-C DSLR camera, with the company shifting entirely to mirrorless cameras.

== Main features ==
- 24.1-megapixel APS-C CMOS sensor with Dual Pixel CMOS AF
- 45 cross-type AF points.
- DIGIC 8, standard ISO 100–25600, H:51200
- High-speed Continuous Shooting at up to 7.0 fps
- Built-in Bluetooth.
- 4K UHD (at 23.98 fps) video recording capability
- Movie Electronic IS
- Built-in HDR and time-lapse recording capability
- 15 Custom Functions with 44 settings settable with the camera
- Menu display: guided (default), the beginner-friendly graphical user interface also found on the 77D, or standard
- Compatible with Bluetooth remote BR-E1

=== Predecessor comparison ===
The Canon EOS Rebel T8i/850D is the successor to the Canon EOS Rebel T7i/800D with the following improvements:

- New 4K video recording capability (at 23.98 fps).
- Longer battery life: 800 vs 600 Shots.
- Faster continuous shooting (burst mode): 7.0 FPS vs 6.0 FPS.
- Better exposure metering
- Bigger RAW Buffer: 40 vs 24 Shots.
- Lighter weight: 471g vs 485g (14g lighter) without lenses.
- Addition of "AF ON" button to facilitate back-button focusing
- Addition of quick control dial
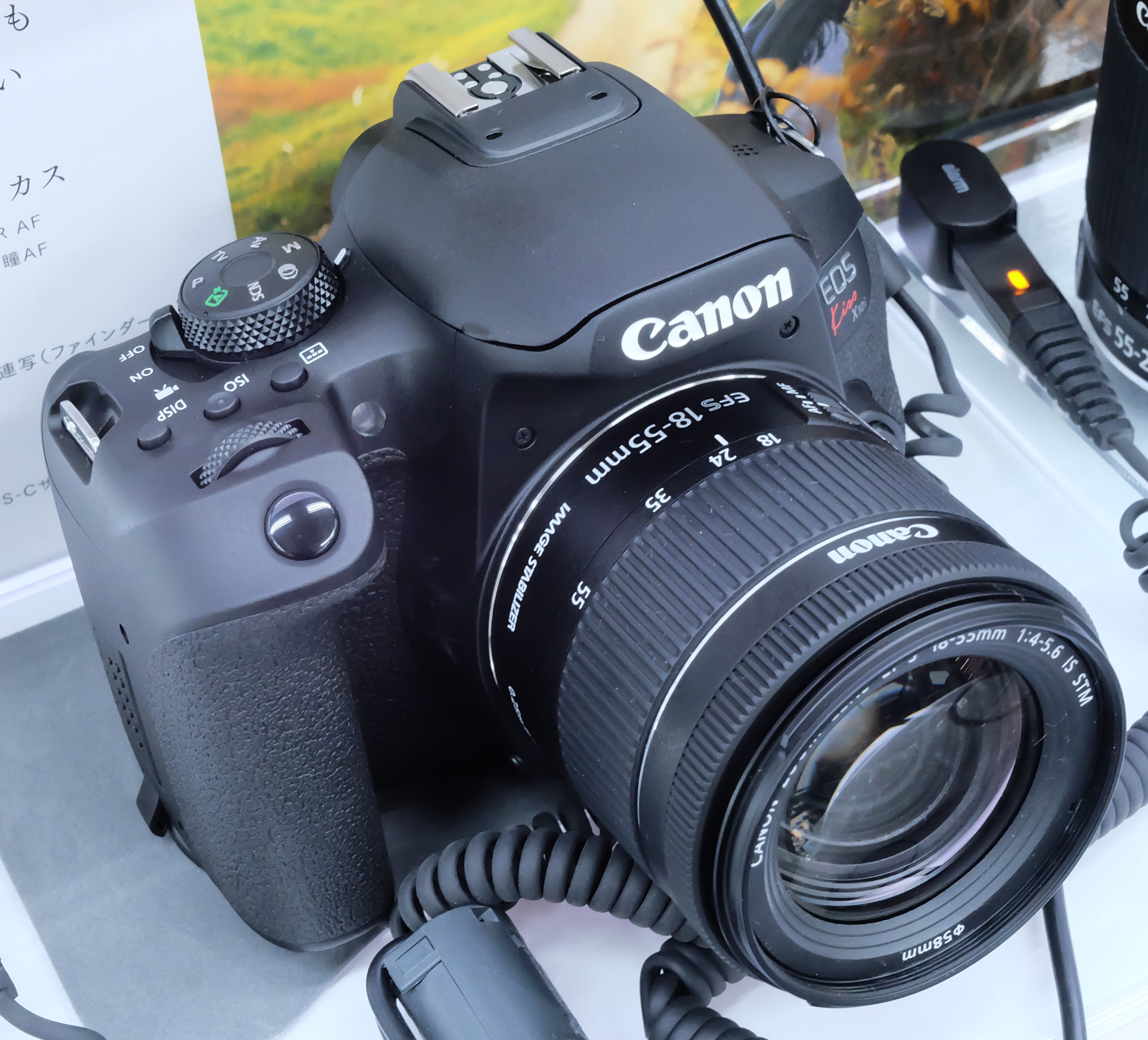

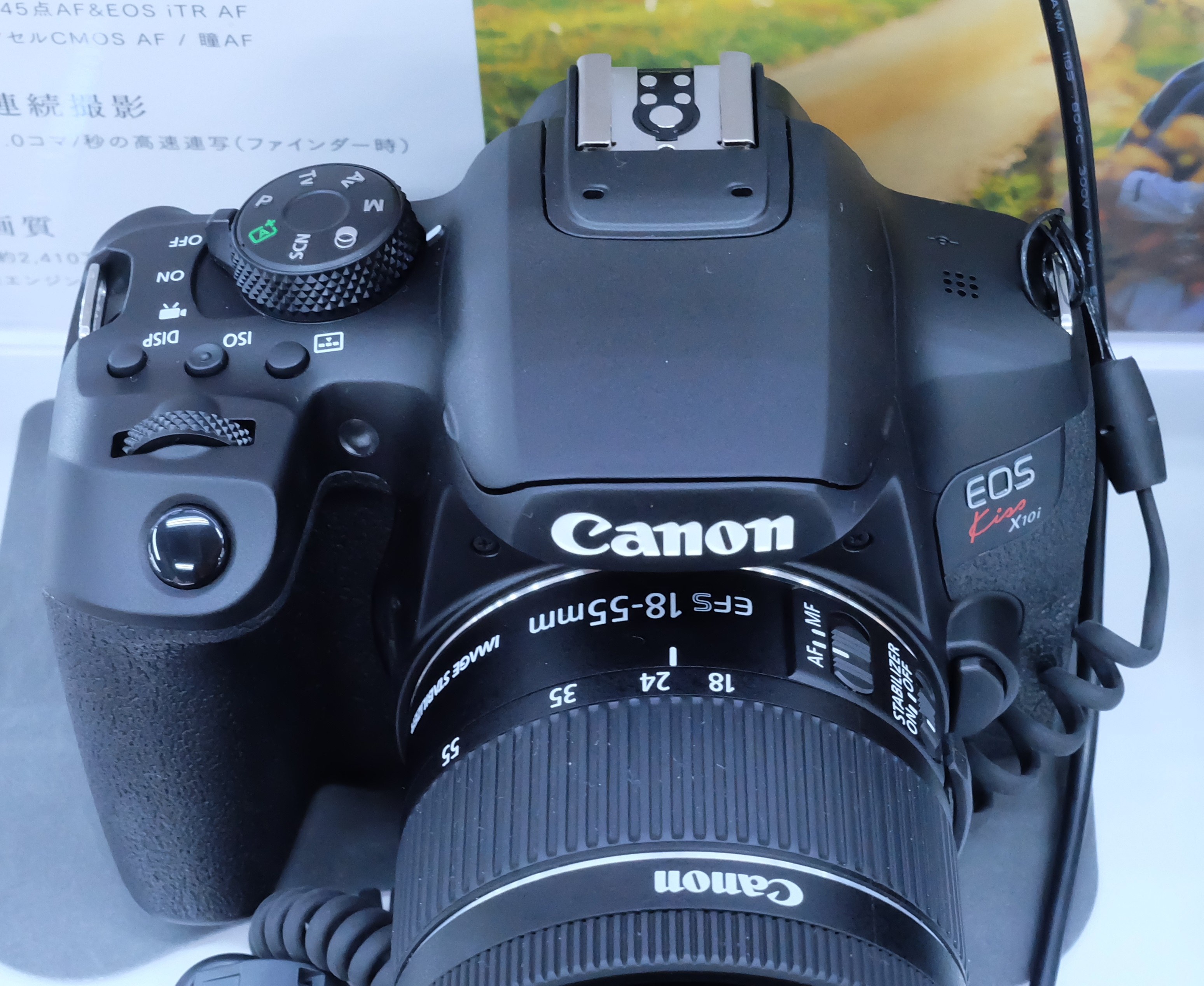

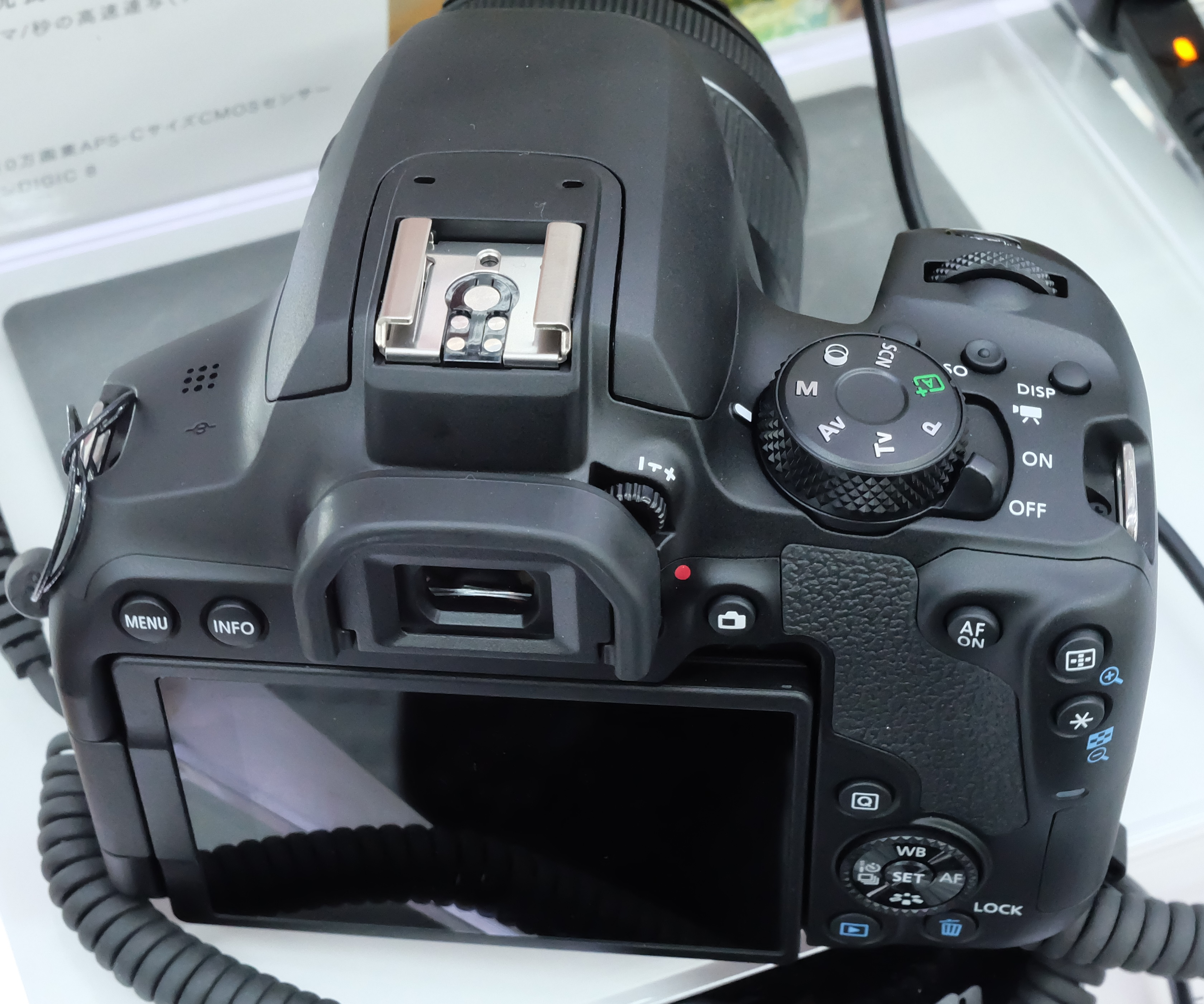

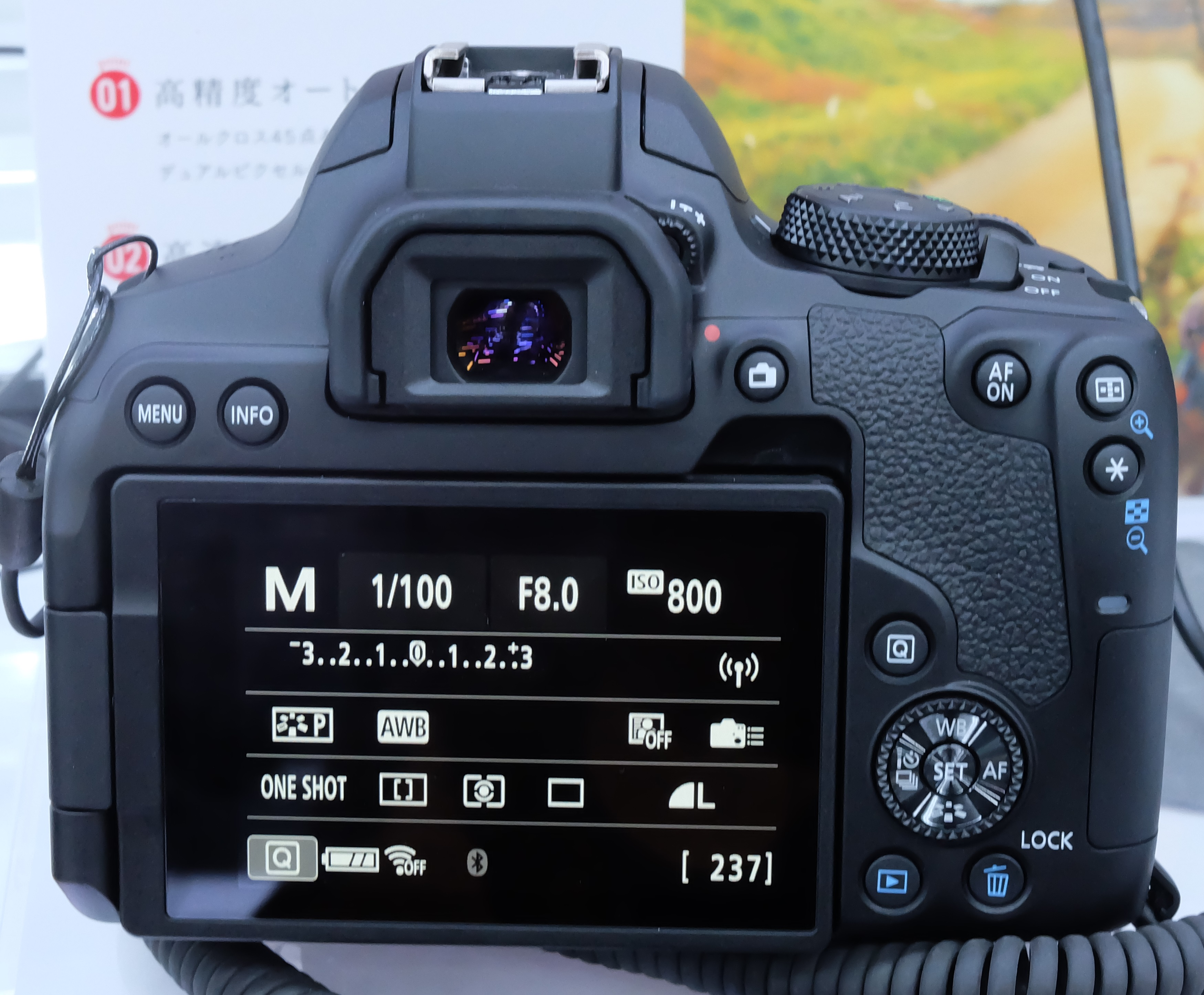

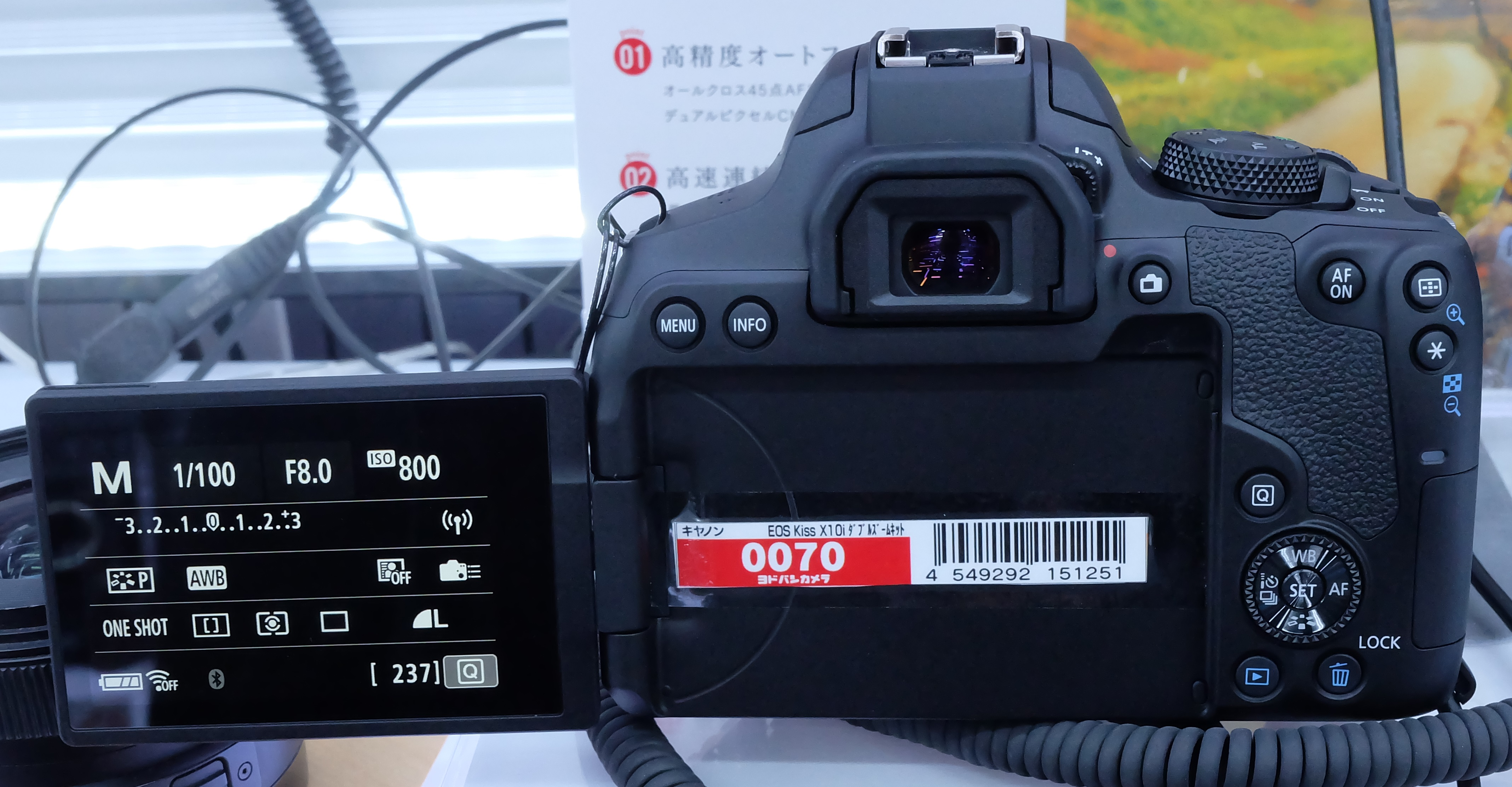

Type	Sensor	Class	00	01	02	03	04	05	06	07	08	09	10	11	12	13	14	15	16	17	18	19	20	21	22	23	24	25	26
DSLR	Full-frame	Flagship				1Ds		1Ds Mk II			1Ds Mk III					1D C													
DSLR	Full-frame	Flagship				1Ds		1Ds Mk II			1Ds Mk III				1D X					1D X Mk II ^{T}			1D X Mk III ^{T}						
DSLR	APS-H	Flagship			1D			1D Mk II	1D Mk II N		1D Mk III		1D Mk IV																
DSLR	Full-frame	Professional																	5DS / 5DS R										
DSLR	Full-frame	Professional							5D			_{x} 5D Mk II			_{x} 5D Mk III					5D Mk IV ^{T}									
DSLR	Full-frame	Advanced														_{x} 6D					_{x} 6D Mk II ^{AT}								
DSLR	APS-C	Advanced											_{x} 7D					_{x} 7D Mk II											
DSLR	APS-C	Mid-range						20Da								_{x} 60Da ^{A}													
DSLR	APS-C	Mid-range		D30	D60	10D		20D	30D		40D	_{x} 50D		_{x} 60D ^{A}			_{x} 70D ^{AT}		80D ^{AT}				90D ^{AT}						
DSLR	APS-C	Mid-range																	760D ^{AT}		77D ^{AT}								
DSLR	APS-C	Entry-level					300D	350D		400D	450D	_{x} 500D	_{x} 550D	_{x} 600D ^{A}		_{x} 650D ^{AT}	_{x} 700D ^{AT}		_{x} 750D ^{AT}		800D ^{AT}			850D ^{AT}					
DSLR	APS-C	Entry-level															_{x} 100D ^{T}		_{x} 200D ^{AT}				250D ^{AT}						
DSLR	APS-C	Entry-level										1000D		_{x} 1100D			_{x} 1200D			1300D		2000D							
DSLR	APS-C	Value																				4000D							
Early models			Canon EOS DCS 5 (1995); Canon EOS DCS 3 (1995); Canon EOS DCS 1 (1995); Canon EOS D2000 (1998); Canon EOS D6000 (1998)																										
Type	Sensor	Spec																											
Type	Sensor	Spec	00	01	02	03	04	05	06	07	08	09	10	11	12	13	14	15	16	17	18	19	20	21	22	23	24	25	26
