= Canon EOS R100 =

2023 APS-C mirrorless camera

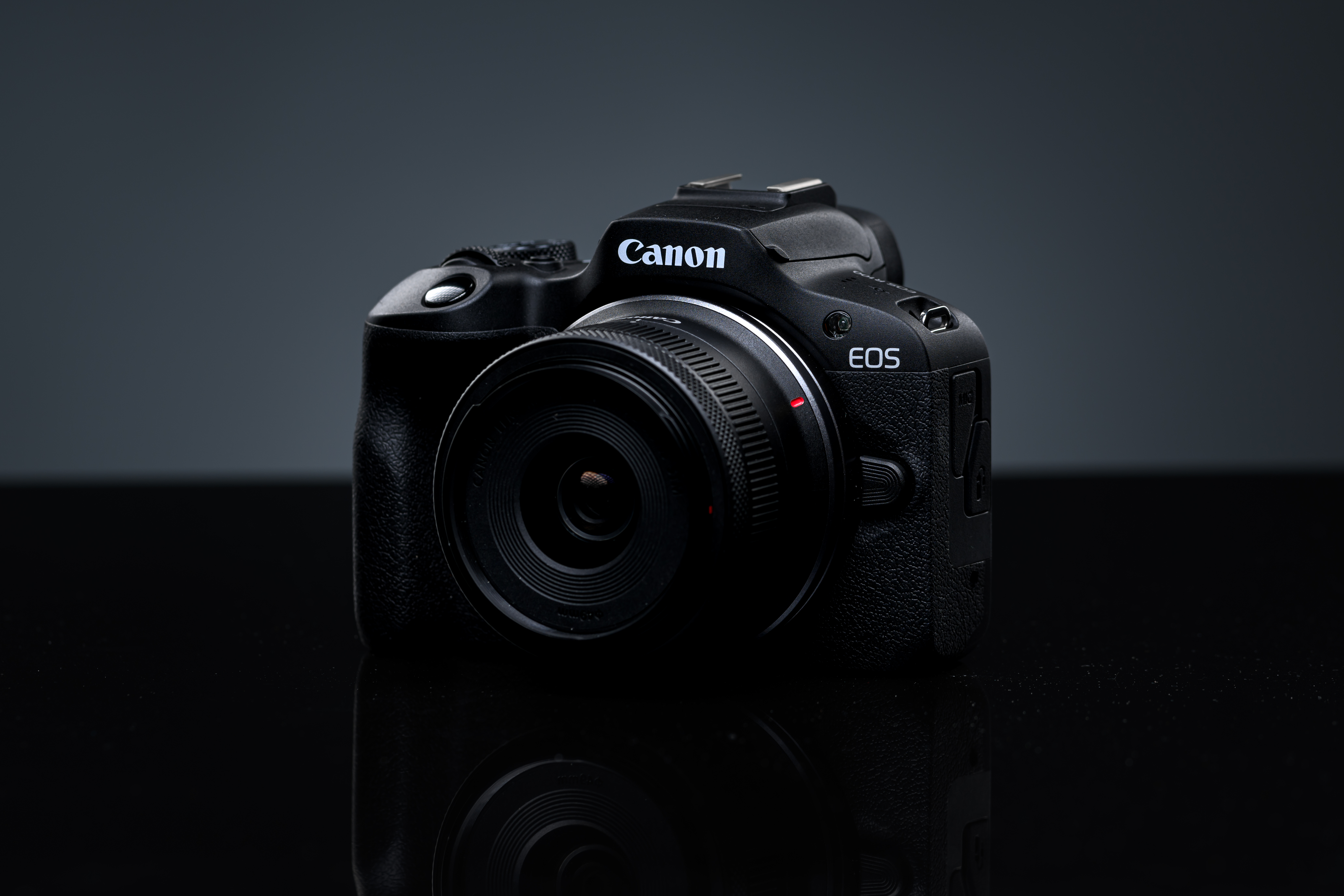
- Black Canon EOS R100 with 18-45mm kit lens

Overview
- Maker: Canon Inc.
- Type: Mirrorless interchangeable lens camera
- Released: 24 May 2023; 3 years ago
- Intro price: US$480 (body only); US$600 (with RF-S 18-45mm f/4.5-6.3 IS STM); US$830 (with RF-S 55-210mm f/5-7.1 IS STM)

Lens
- Lens mount: Canon RF
- Lens: Interchangeable lens

Sensor/medium
- Sensor type: CMOS
- Sensor size: APS-C (22.3 × 14.9 mm)
- Maximum resolution: 6000 × 4000 pixels (24.1 megapixels)
- Film speed: ISO 100 – 12,800; expandable to 25,600
- Recording medium: 1× SDXC UHS-I compatible

Focusing
- Focus: Dual Pixel CMOS AF

Flash
- Flash: Hot shoe, built-in

Shutter
- Frame rate: 6.5 fps (one shot AF); 3.5 fps (servo AF)
- Shutter: Electronic first curtain Electronic
- Shutter speeds: 30s - 1/4000s

Viewfinder
- Electronic viewfinder: 1.0 cm (0.39 in) 1024x768 (2.36-million-dot) OLED
- Viewfinder magnification: 0.95x
- Frame coverage: 100%

Image processing
- Image processor: DIGIC 8

General
- Video recording: 4K resolution (23.98 fps)
- LCD screen: 7.5 cm (3.0 in) 1.04-million-dot fixed screen
- Battery: LP-E17
- AV port: HDMI Type-D
- Data port(s): USB 2.0 Type-C, Wi-Fi 4 (2.4 GHz), Bluetooth 4.2
- Dimensions: 116 mm × 86 mm × 69 mm (4.6 in × 3.4 in × 2.7 in)
- Weight: 356 g (12.6 oz) (including battery and memory card)
- Latest firmware: 1.1.0 / 20 September 2024; 21 months ago
- Made in: China / Japan

Chronology
- Predecessor: Canon EOS 2000D (DSLR); Canon EOS M200 (EF-M mirrorless)

The Canon EOS R100 is an entry-level crop-frame mirrorless interchangeable-lens camera produced by Canon. It was announced on May 24, 2023, and released it in July 2023.

== Features ==
Unlike the other cameras in the EOS R line, the R100 has a fixed LCD screen with no touchscreen feature. It also uses the 24.2MP APS-C CMOS sensor and DIGIC 8 from the EOS M50 Mark II. The viewfinder uses a 2.36M dot OLED. The camera is capable of shooting up to 3.5 fps burst with autofocus (6.5 fps on manual focus). Video can be shot at 4K/24p cropped, as well as high-speed shooting of 120 fps at 1280 x 720.

== See also ==
other Canon APS-C mirrorless cameras from the same period:

- Canon EOS R7
- Canon EOS R10
- Canon EOS R50

Sensor	Class	12	13	14	15	16	17	18	19	20	21	22	23	24	25	26
Full-frame	Flagship														_{m} R1 ^{ATS}	
Full-frame	Professional											_{m} R3 ^{ATS}				
Full-frame	Professional										R5 ^{ATSR}				_{m} R5 Mk II ^{ATSR}	
Full-frame	Professional											_{m} R5 C ^{ATCR}				
Full-frame	Advanced										R6 ^{ATS}		_{m} R6 Mk II ^{ATS}			_{m} R6 Mk III ^{ATS}
Full-frame	Advanced															R6 V ^{ATS}
Full-frame	Advanced									Ra ^{AT}						
Full-frame	Advanced								R ^{AT}							
Full-frame	Midrange													_{m} R8 ^{AT}		
Full-frame	Entry/mid								RP ^{AT}							
APS-C	Advanced												_{m} R7 ^{ATS}			
APS-C	Midrange						M5 ^{FT}						_{m} R10 ^{AT}			
APS-C	Entry/mid		_{x} M ^{T}	M2 ^{T}	M3 ^{FT}			M6 ^{FT}		M6 Mk II ^{FT}						
APS-C	Entry/mid								M50 ^{AT}		M50 Mk II ^{AT}			_{m} R50 ^{AT}		
APS-C	Entry/mid															_{m} R50 V ^{AT}
APS-C	Entry					M10 ^{FT}		M100 ^{FT}		M200 ^{FT}				R100		
Sensor	Class															
Sensor	Class	12	13	14	15	16	17	18	19	20	21	22	23	24	25	26
