= Canon EOS 500N =

1996 35mm single-lens reflex camera

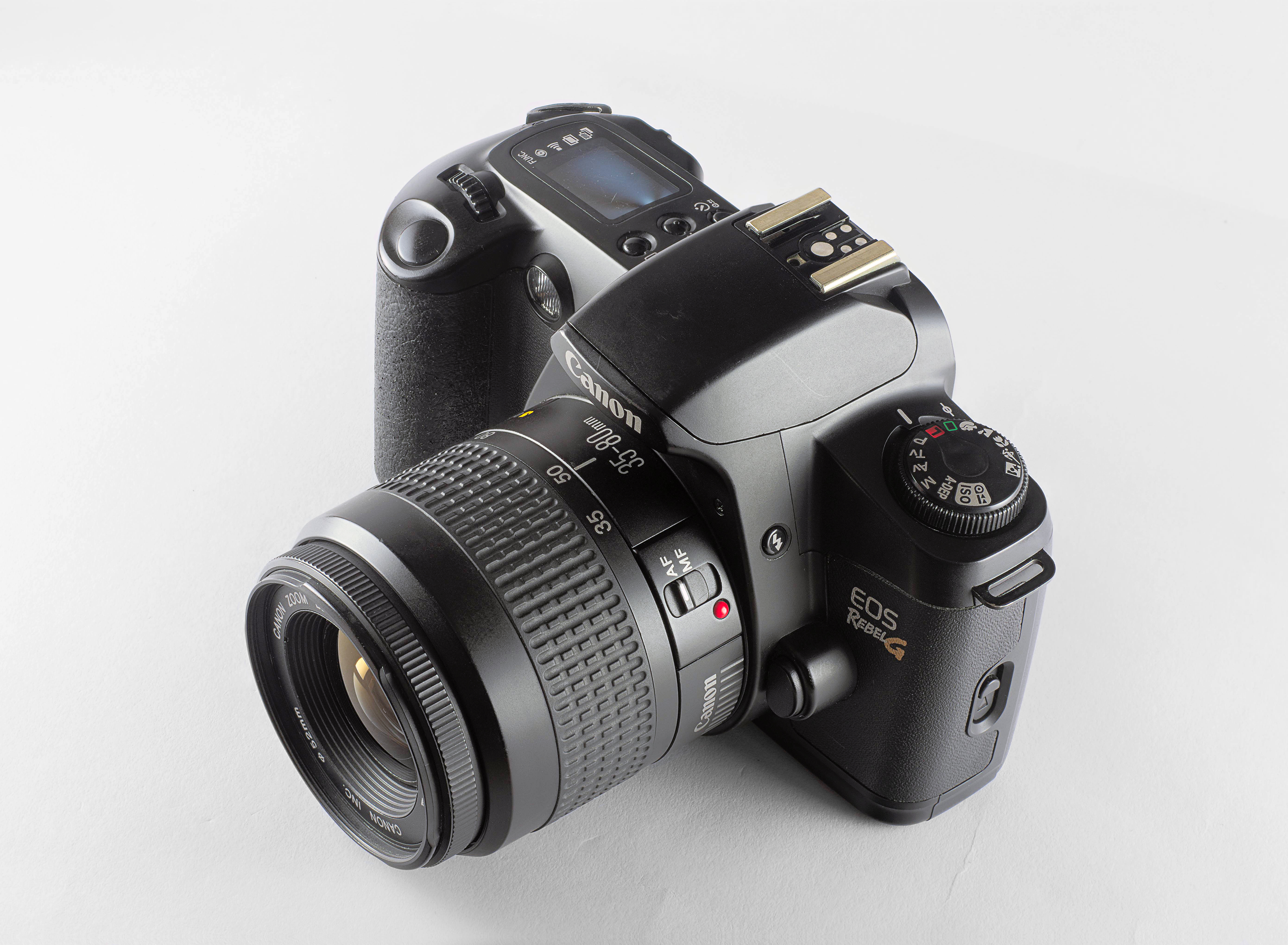

Overview
- Maker: Canon Inc.
- Type: 35 mm SLR
- Released: September 1996
- Intro price: JPY 59,000 (body only)

Lens
- Lens mount: Canon EF lens mount

Sensor/medium
- Film format: 35 mm
- Film speed: ISO 25 - 5000 (DX) ISO 6-6400 (manual)

Focusing
- Focus: TTL phase detection autofocus

Exposure/metering
- Exposure: Composite SPC for TTL full-aperture metering (6-zone evaluative, 9.5% partial at center, and centerweighted averaging)

Flash
- Flash: Built-in flash
- Flash synchronization: 30s - 1/90s

Shutter
- Frame rate: 1 frame/s
- Shutter speeds: 30s - 1/2000s

General
- Battery: 2x 3V CR123A
- Dimensions: 146×92×62 mm (5.7×3.6×2.4 in), 400 g

The Canon EOS 500N is a single-lens reflex 35mm film camera made by Canon. It was originally known in Japan as the New EOS Kiss, and EOS Rebel G in North America, was introduced in 1996 and replaced in 1999 by the Rebel 2000.

== Specifications ==
The body of the Rebel G is plastic, weighing 370 g (13 oz). The only colors available were black or a mix of silver and black. The Rebel G has an EF lens mount making it compatible with any EF lens. The viewfinder offers a 0.7x magnification, 90% coverage, center auto focus, wide auto focus and many more. The Rebel G shooting modes consisted of 6 basic modes, full auto, portrait, landscape, macro, sports and night scene. It also has 5 advanced modes, P, Av, Tv, M, A-DEP. These modes would continue on in the Rebel G series. The camera features a built in flash, and can shoot at 1 fps. The fastest shutter speed with flash was measured at 1/90 of a second.

Class	1987	1988	1989	1990	1991	1992	1993	1994	1995	1996	1997	1998	1999	2000	2001	2002	2003	2004	2005	2006	2007	…	2018
Professional				1					1N					1V									
Professional				RT					1N RS														
High-end				10			5						3										
Advanced		620		600		100				50					30				30V				
Midrange	650				1000F	1000F N		500			500N			300			300V		300X				
Entry-level		750	850	700					5000				3000			3000N		3000V					
Entry-level											IX												
Entry-level												IX 7											
