= Canon Dual Pixel CMOS AF =

Camera autofocus system

Canon Dual Pixel CMOS AF is a proprietary autofocus technology developed by Canon Inc., first introduced in mid-2013 with the Canon EOS 70D DSLR.

== Overview ==
Dual Pixel CMOS AF enables every imaging pixel on a supported CMOS sensor to perform both phase-detection autofocus and image capture. Each pixel is split into two independent photodiodes (side-by-side or top/bottom), allowing the camera to compare light arriving at the two halves for phase detection, and then combine the full signal for image output.

Unlike earlier systems that used separate AF sensors or sparse on-sensor AF pixels, Dual Pixel allows autofocus across a wide central area – about 80% of the frame in early implementations (e.g. EOS 70D) — with later mirrorless models realizing nearly 100% frame coverage.
