= Canon EF-S 18–55mm lens =

Camera lens

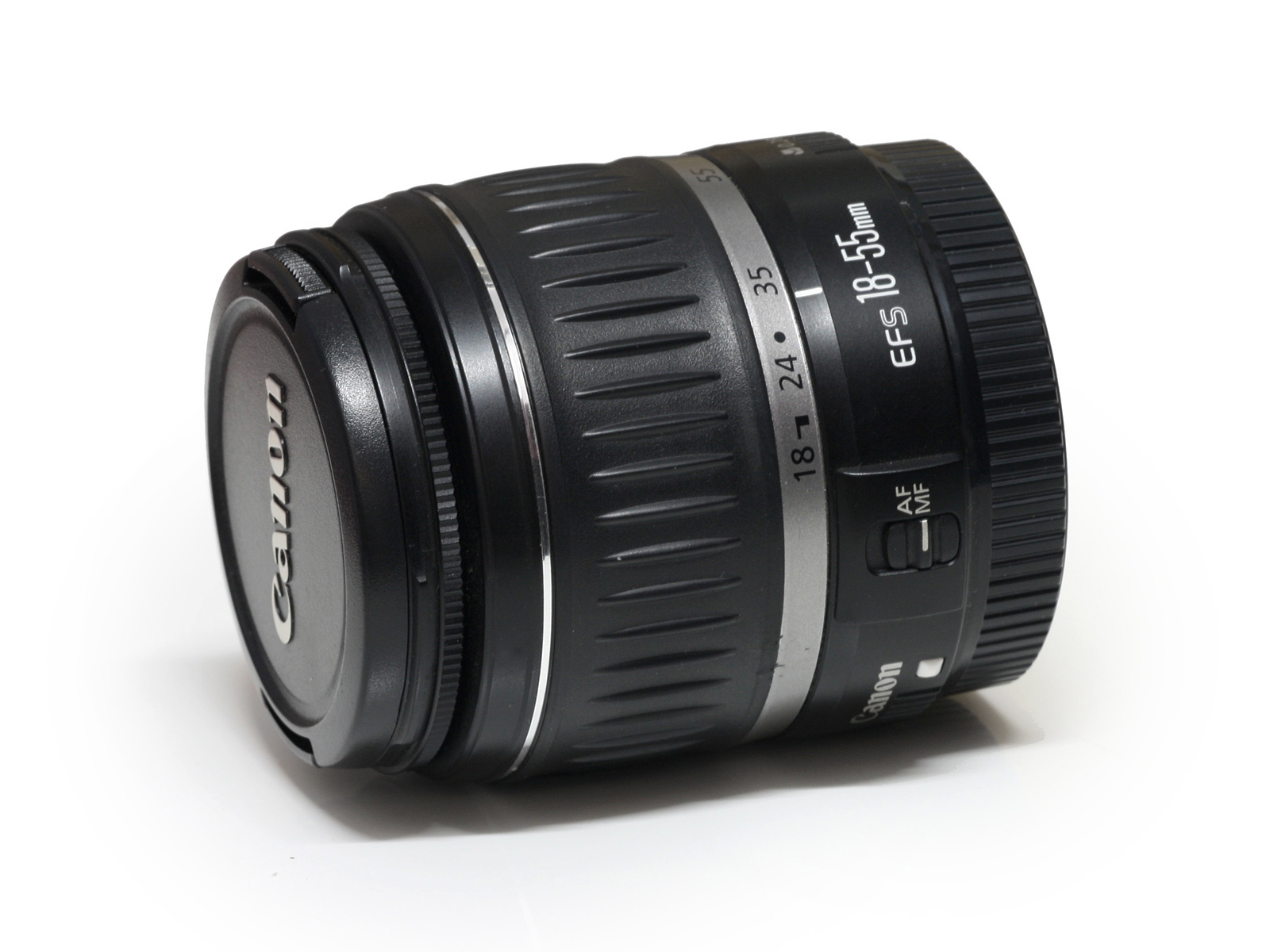
The 18–55mm USM lens.

The Canon EF-S 18–55mm lens f/3.5–5.6 is a Canon-produced wide-angle to mid telephoto zoom lens for digital single-lens reflex cameras with an EF-S lens mount. The field of view has a 35 mm equivalent focal length of 28.8–88mm, and it is a standard kit lens on Canon's consumer APS-C DSLRs. In February 2017 Canon announced the new Canon EF-S 18–55mm lens f/4–5.6 IS STM with a smaller aperture, which made the lens 20% smaller according to Canon.

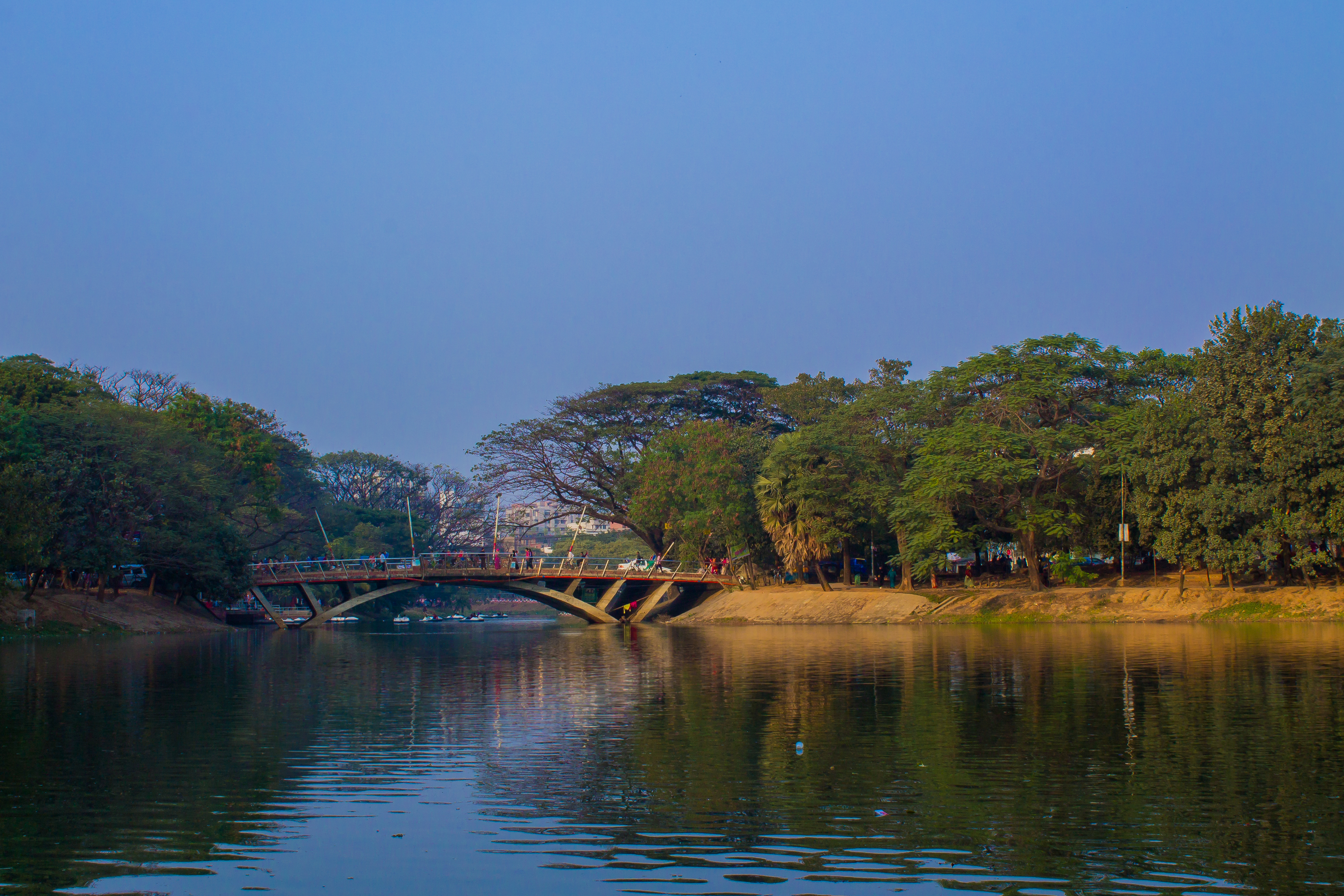
Dhanmondi Lake taken by Canon EF-S 18–55mm lens

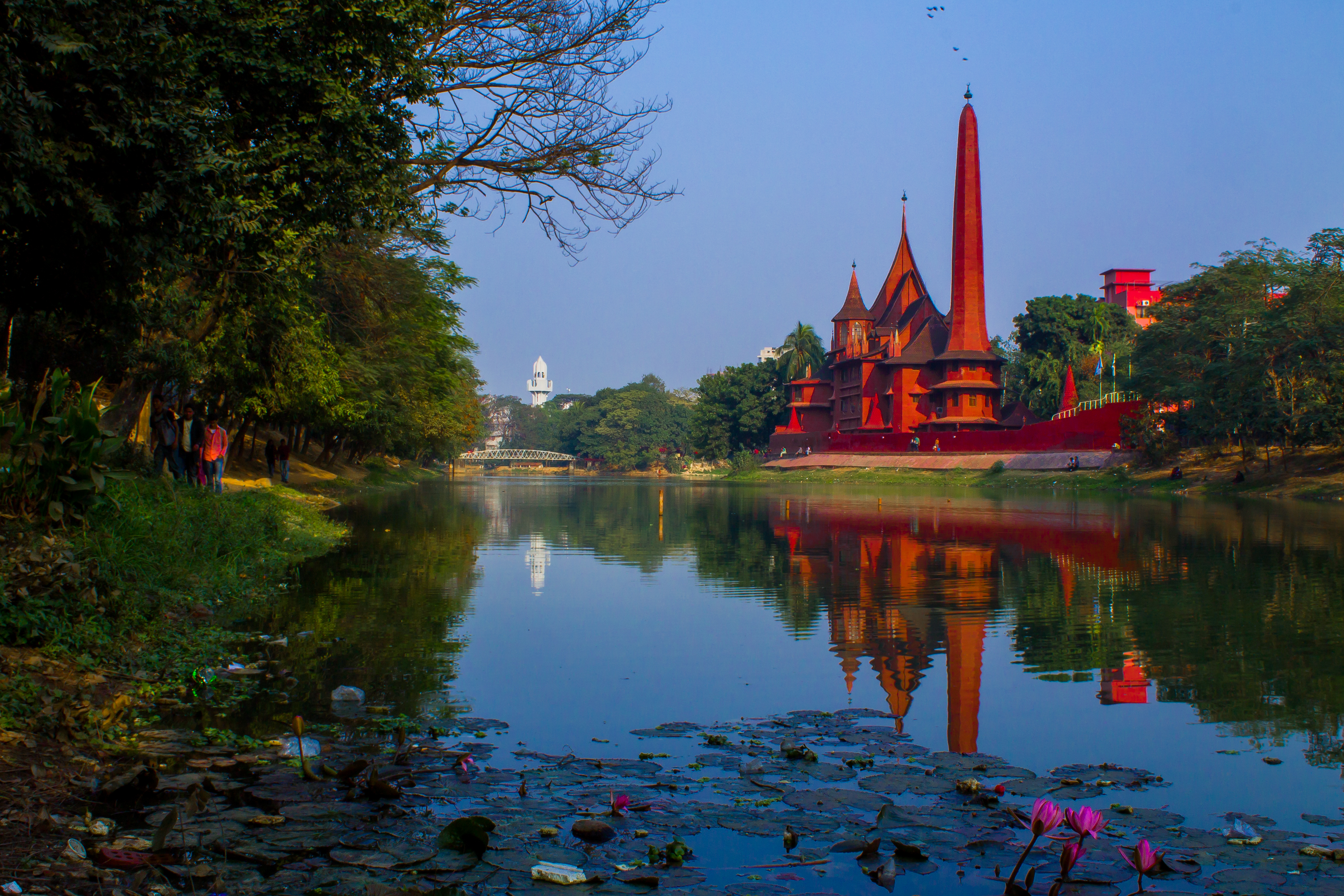
Dhanmondi Lake taken by Canon EF-S 18–55mm lens

There have been nine iterations of this lens, five of which are discontinued and four of which are currently in production: III (kit only and most 'basic'), IS II, and the two IS STM lenses.

- I USM (discontinued)
- I (discontinued)
- II USM (discontinued)
- II (discontinued)
- IS (discontinued)
- IS II (current)
- III (current)
- IS STM (current)
- f/4-5.6 IS STM (current)

== EF-S 18–55mm USM I/II / EF-S 18–55mm I/II ==
The lens body has a plastic construction, including the lens mount. Generally, however, this version of the lens is soft and must be stopped down to gain acceptable sharpness. Barrel distortion becomes quite noticeable at the wide-angle setting and chromatic aberration (purple fringing) is common.

== EF-S 18–55mm IS I/II ==
On 20 August 2007, the EF-S 18-55mm IS was announced along with the EOS 40D. The lens featured improved optical quality over previous versions and added image stabilization.

On 7 February 2011, the 18–55mm 1:3.5–5.6 IS II was announced to be bundled with the EOS 600D and 1100D.

== EF-S 18–55mm IS STM ==
On 21 March 2013, the 18–55mm f/3.5–5.6 IS STM was announced alongside the EOS 700D/Rebel T5i and 100D/Rebel SL1. It has a different optical formula from that of any previous Canon 18–55mm lens, and includes Canon's STM (stepping motor) technology, claimed by the company to offer quieter continuous autofocus while shooting video when attached to bodies that have Canon's hybrid autofocus sensor technology. The STM is also the first 18–55mm version with an internal focusing design. At introduction, it was offered as a kit lens on both the 700D and 100D; it has since become one of two alternative kit lenses for the 70D.

== EF-S 18–55mm f/4–5.6 IS STM ==
On 14 February 2017, the 18–55mm f/4–5.6 IS STM was announced alongside the EOS 800D/Rebel T7i, 200D, and the 77D. It has a different optical formula from that of any previous Canon 18–55mm lens and a smaller aperture, which made it possible to reduce the lens' physical size.

== Specifications ==
| Attribute | I USM | I | II USM | II | IS | IS II | III | f/3.5–5.6 IS STM | f/4–5.6 IS STM |
|---|---|---|---|---|---|---|---|---|---|
| Reference | | | | | | | | | |
| Image | | | | | | | | | |
Key features
| Image stabilizer | No No | | | | Yes Yes (4 stops) | | No No | Yes Yes (4 stops) | |
| Micro USM | Yes Yes | No No | Yes Yes | No No | | | | | |
| DC Micro Motor | No No | Yes Yes | No No | Yes Yes | | | | No No | |
| Stepping motor | No No | | | | | | | Yes Yes | |
| Internal focusing | No No | | | | | | | Yes Yes | |
| L-series | No No | | | | | | | | |
| Diffractive Optics | No No | | | | | | | | |
| Aspherical element | Yes Yes | | | | | | | | |
| Macro | No No | | | | | | | | |
| Short back focus | Yes Yes | | | | | | | | |
| Improvements | (original) | identical to the Mk I USM but without an ultrasonic motor | similar optics to the Mk I, but with changes to the shape of the zoom ring and the tapered area at the front of the lens | Identical to the Mk II USM but without an ultrasonic motor | Adding image stabilization and addressing general image quality problems of the Mk I and II | Identical to the IS I but with a revised external design | Similar to the IS II but without image stabilization | Similar to the IS II but with Internal Focusing and STM motor | Revised optical design, 20% smaller (but 10 grams heavier); and smaller aperture at 18mm |
Physical data
| Weight | 190 g | | | | 200 g | | | 205 g | 215 g |
| Max. Diameter × Length | 68.5 mm × 66 mm | | | | 68.5 mm × 70 mm | | | 69.0 mm × 75.2 mm | 66.5 mm × 61.8 mm |
| Filter diameter | 58 mm | | | | | | | | |
Technical data
| Maximum aperture | f/3.5–5.6 | | | | | | | | f/4–5.6 |
| Minimum aperture | f/22–36 | | | | | | | | f/22–32 |
| Horizontal viewing angle | 64°30'–23°20' | | | | | | | | |
| Vertical viewing angle | 45°30'–15°40' | | | | | | | | |
| Diagonal viewing angle; | 74°20'–27°50' | | | | | | | | |
| Groups/elements | 9/11 | | | | | | | 11/13 | 10/12 |
| # of diaphragm blades | 6 | | | | | | | 7 | |
| Closest focusing distance | 0.28 m | | | | 0.25 m | | | | |
| Maximum magnification | 0.28× | | | | 0.34× | | | | 0.25× |
Accessories
| Lens hood | EW-60C (circular) | | | | | | | EW-63C (petal) | |
| Case | LP814 | | | | | | | LP1016 | |
Retail information
| Release date | September 2003 | | February 2005 | | August 2007 | February 2011 | | April 2013 | April 2017 |
| MSRP $ | $239.99 | Kit only | $239.99 | Kit only | $199.99 | | Kit only | $249.99 | |
| Currently in production? | No No | | | | | Yes Yes | | | |
