= Bred Hampton =

American photographer

Kalvin Banton, known professionally as Bred Hampton, is an American filmmaker and photographer who specializes in lifestyle images in and around the Boston area. Hampton, a self-taught artist, is known for capturing hip hop musicians and athletes, including Boston Celtics player Jayson Tatum.

== Early life and amateur beginnings ==
The son of Jamaican immigrants, Hampton was born and raised in the Dorchester neighborhood in Boston, Massachusetts. He described himself as a "difficult" teenager who was a class clown in high school. Hampton developed a fascination for photography during his youth, citing a memorable image of NBA player Allen Iverson with an afro on the cover of SLAM magazine (March 1999) as a significant influence.

With no intentions of being a professional photographer, Hampton bought his first camera, a Canon T6i, in 2017 while working as a security guard. He learned the craft by studying video tutorials and got his start by asking local residents if he could photograph them.

== Career ==
=== Early years ===
In the early days of his career, Hampton took photos of Boston's music scene. Thanks to friends like DJ E Dubble from JAM’N 94.5, a local radio station, Hampton gained access to other national celebrities, like Cam’ron, Playboi Carti, Blueface, Trippie Redd, and Lil Baby, growing his connections and portfolio. At this time, he aspired to become a tour photographer and was invited to document the tour for recording artist JID, but Hampton ultimately was not selected.

=== Sports photography and the Boston Celtics ===
Thanks to a personal connection in the Boston area, Hampton began an internship with the Harvard University men's basketball team, where he captured photos and created videos that boosted their visibility and social media presence during the 2019-2020 season. Hampton described this experience as a turning point when he decided that he wanted to make films professionally.

He officially started sports photography during summer 2019 when he snapped SLAM magazine’s annual summer basketball classic; this is where he met Terrence "T" Clarke, another Boston native, who was a rising star player for the University of Kentucky Wildcats basketball team. Clarke encouraged Hampton to pursue videography after seeing one of Hampton's edits.

Another professional turning point occurred in 2020 when Jayson Tatum, then in his third NBA season, granted Hampton permission to document his first NBA All Star Game appearance in Chicago, including not only in-game photos but also more personal moments, such as going to a barber shop. Hampton also has documented key life events for Tatum's teammate Jaylen Brown, such as Brown's 23rd birthday party.

By 2021, Hampton began working full-time for the Boston Celtics as a photographer and video producer and was responsible for traveling with and documenting the team on and off the court. He has captured several pivotal team moments, such as the 2022 Jersey Retirement Ceremony of former Boston Celtic, Kevin Garnett, and the 2024 NBA championship parade in Boston, where Hampton rode in a duck boat with Tatum. At the conclusion of the final game of the season, Hampton captured on video a heartfelt interaction between Tatum and his mother, Brandy Cole, exclaiming, "What are they gonna say now?"

=== Commercials and films ===
Hampton appears in and developed footage and cinematography for the 2024 Netflix series Starting Five, which features Jayson Tatum and other NBA star players. This year, he also appeared alongside Tatum in a Nike commercial for the Tatum 2 sneaker.

=== Style and aesthetic ===
Hampton has noted that he regularly explores different motifs and angles to capture basketball moments, in particular, in order to grow as a photographer and to avoid cliches when possible.

== Personal ==
The "Bred Hampton" pseudonym partly is an homage to Hampton's favorite sneaker, the Jordan Bred 4s, and to Black Panther Party leader Fred Hampton.

Hampton identifies as a lifelong fan of the Boston Celtics and much of his work is focused on the city of Boston. In 2024, Boston Mayor Michele Wu declared October 19 as Bred Hampton Day.
