= STC Orlan-10 =

Russian unmanned aerial vehicle

Orlan-10
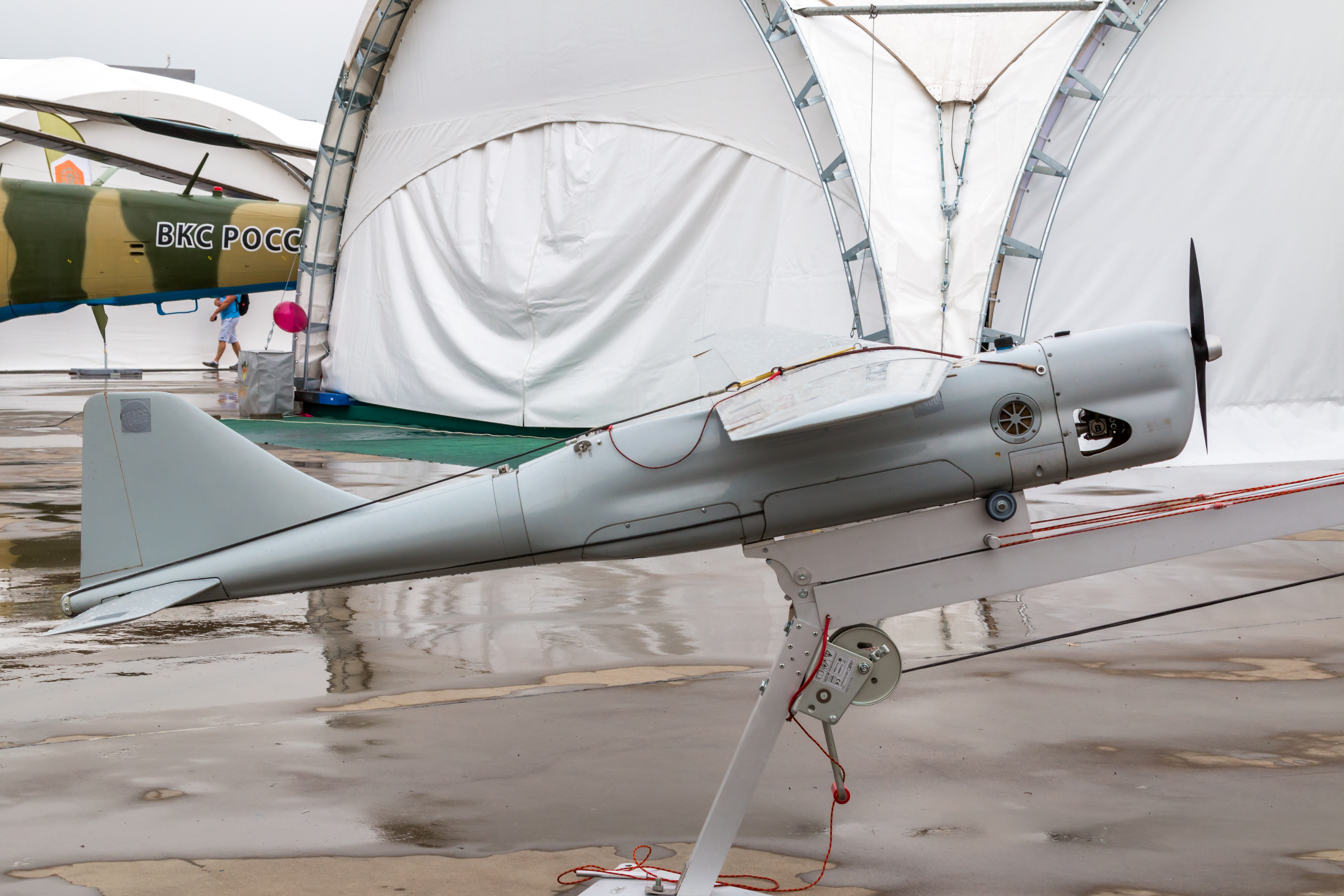
- An Orlan-10 on display in 2022

General information
- Type: Reconnaissance unmanned aerial vehicle
- National origin: Russia
- Manufacturer: Special Technology Center (STC)
- Status: In service
- Primary users: Russian Ground Forces Ministry of Emergency Situations

The Orlan-10 (Russian: Орлан-10) is a reconnaissance unmanned aerial vehicle (UAV) developed by the Special Technology Center (STC) in Saint Petersburg for the Russian Armed Forces. The Orlan-10 features a composite fuselage that reduces its radar signature.

Drones are usually deployed in groups of two or three; the first is used for reconnaissance at a height of 1,000 to 1,500 metres (3,300 to 4,900 ft), the second for electronic warfare and the third as a data relay. One system can include up to five vehicles.

In 2020, a larger Orlan-30 version was introduced, with a laser designator option to increase the effectiveness of other precision weapons, following testing in 2019. Its export version was first presented in August 2023.

== Production history ==
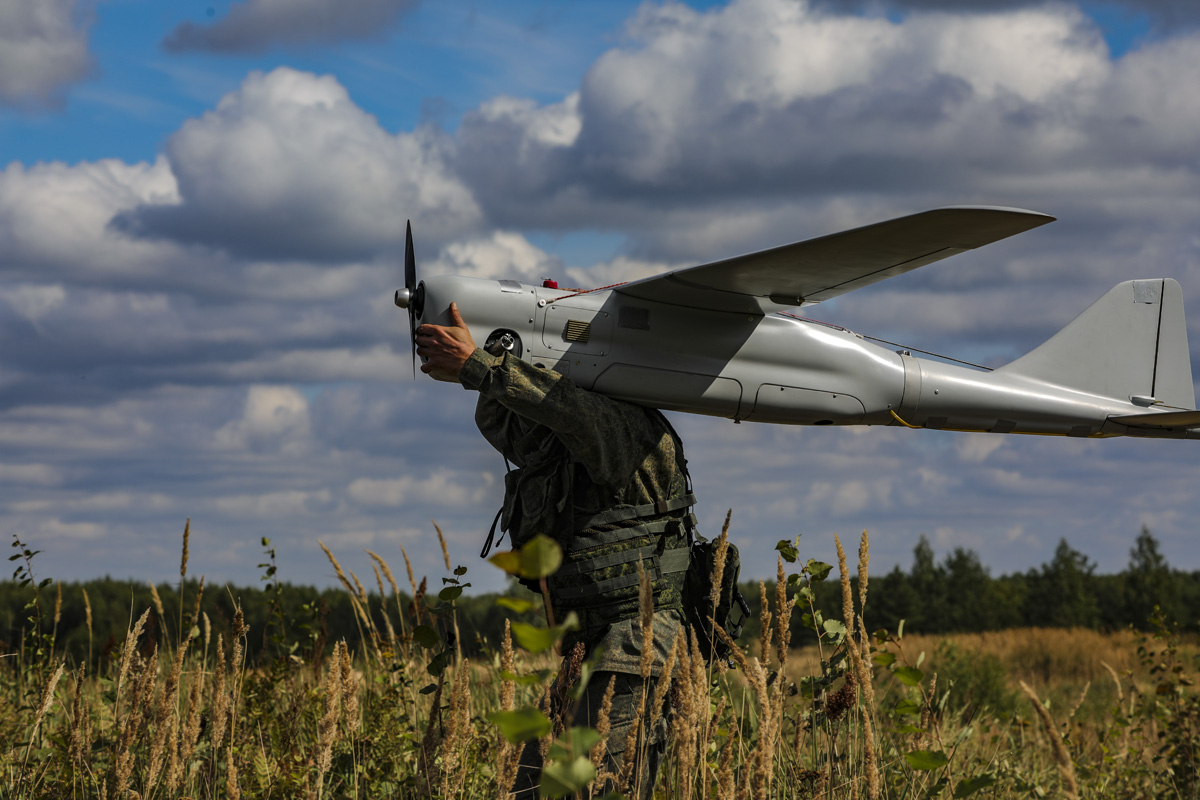
Orlan-10 being carried by soldier

More than 1,000 Orlan-10s have been produced (2018), with 11 different variations. More Orlan-10s and 30s were ordered in August 2022. The price for one system (including 2 drones, a portable launch complex, a control station and a set of spare parts) was reportedly 5 million rubles ($150,000) in 2013.

Over 50 Orlan UAVs were delivered for export in 2021 to Russia's allies. It has seen action in Ukraine, Syria, Libya and Nagorno-Karabakh.

In 2023, reports stated that components made in Ireland and STMicroelectronics microchips were found in Orlan drones, in spite of the sanctions regime imposed on Russia. On 3 January 2023, CBS News reported that Orlan-10 shot in the past 4 months contained U.S. and Swiss made microchips (Maxim, Microchip and U-Blok) used for their ability to connect to the GLONASS positioning system for navigation. These chips are also able to access the GPS and Galileo systems contributing to redundancy and increase accuracy for flying and targeting.

In July 2023, Russian Defense Minister Sergey Shoigu stated that the supplies of Orlan-10 and −30 drones had surged 53 times since early 2022. In February 2024, the manufacturer claimed an annual production of over 1000 Orlan-10.

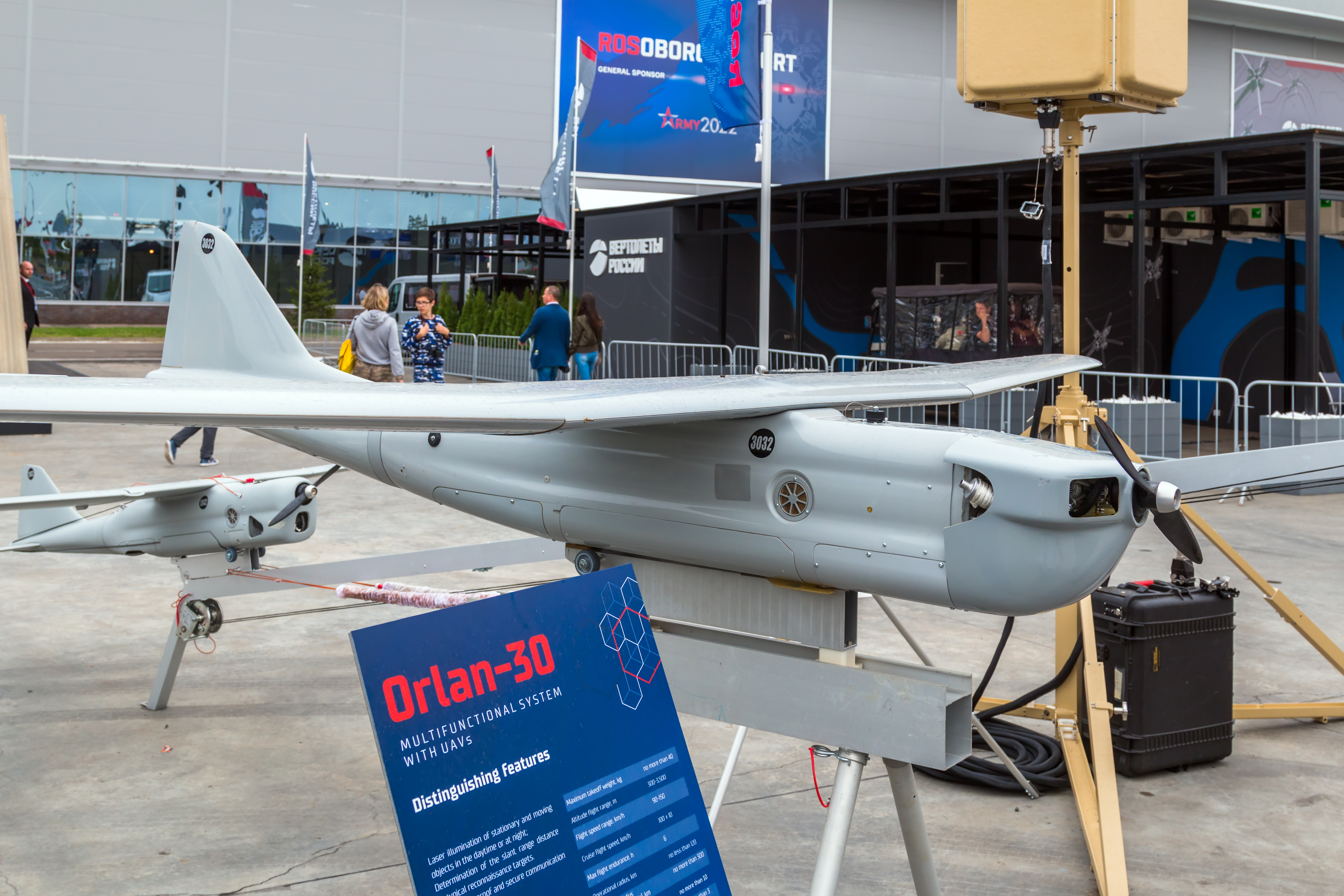
Orlan-30 at a 2022 trade show

== Operational history ==
=== Ukraine ===
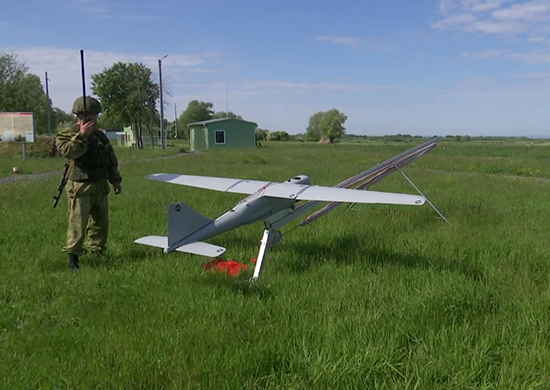
Orlan-10 on the launch catapult

==== War in Donbas ====
The Orlan-10 was used in the war in Donbas. In this conflict aerial reconnaissance by unmanned aerial vehicles was banned by the Minsk agreements. Ukrainian officials have claimed to have had shot down or captured several UAVs of this type since 2014:

- In May 2014, Ukrainian officials reported that they had shot down an Orlan-10 in Ukraine.
- In July 2014, Ukrainian forces shot down two UAVs of this type – No. 10212 near Zelenopillia and No. 10237 near Amvrosiivka.
- In August 2014, another Orlan-10 (No. 10215) was shot down by the Ukrainian forces with Strela-10 SAM system.
- In April 2016, the Security Service of Ukraine (SBU) published a video of the UAV (No. 10264) which it claimed to have shot down near Avdiivka.
- In November 2016, Ukrainian officials stated that they had retrieved an Orlan-10 (No. 10332) drifting on the Azov Sea near Mariupol.
- In September 2017, an Orlan-10 (No. 11057) fell down on Ukrainian territory and was captured by Ukrainian forces.
- On 28 December 2017, Ukrainian troops shot down another Orlan-10 near Toretsk.
- On 10 January 2018, Ukrainian troops shot down another Orlan-10.
- On 13 October 2018, an Orlan-10 was shot down by a Ukrainian Mi-24 helicopter using gunfire near Lysychansk.
- On 19 November 2018, an Orlan-10 UAV was shot down by Ukrainian air defense forces. RB-341V Leer-3 electronic warfare systems, which can control up to three Orlan-10 drones, were also spotted in Ukraine by OSCE in 2018 and 2020.

==== Russo-Ukrainian war (2022–present) ====
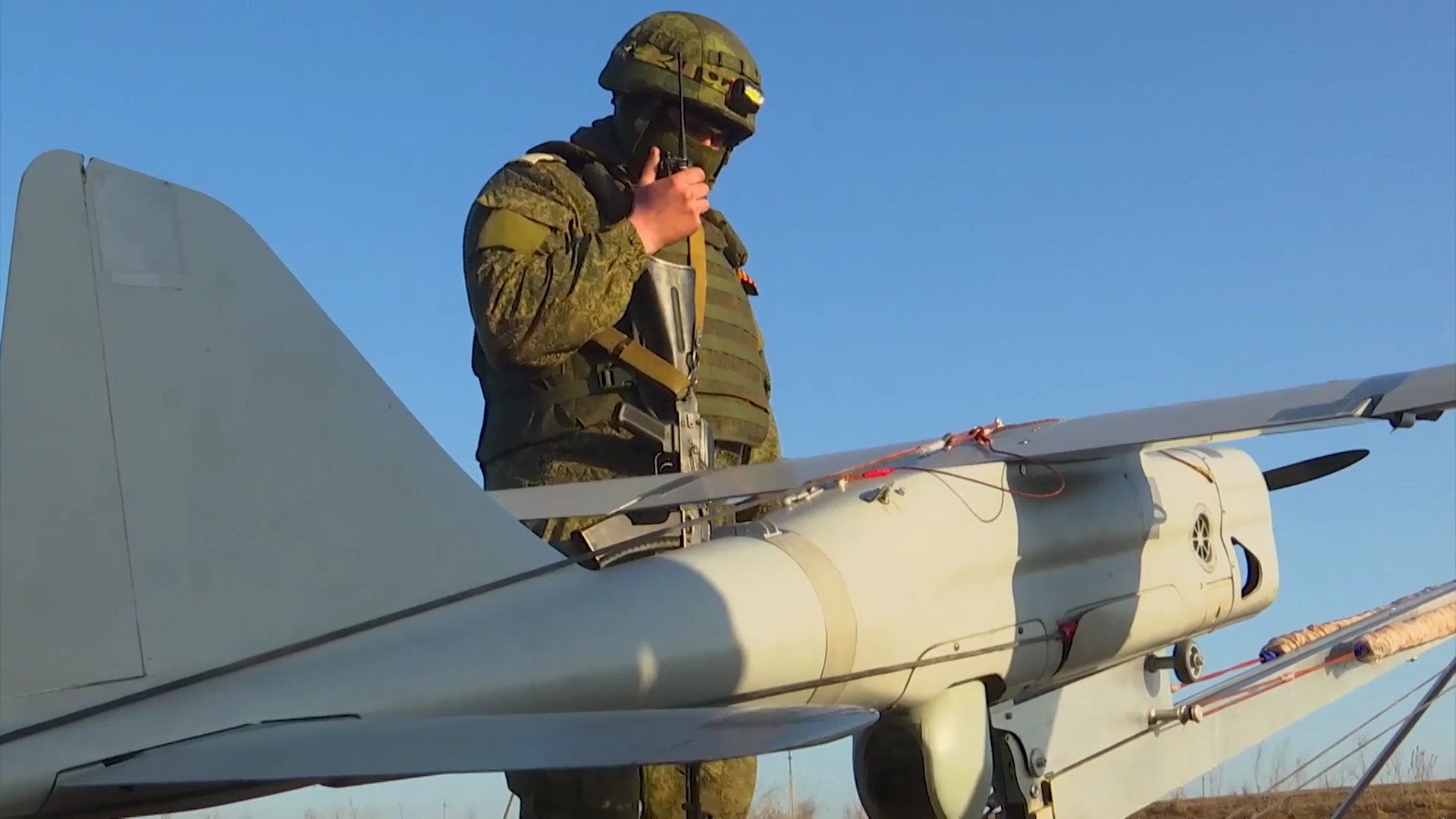
Orlan-10 used during the invasion of Ukraine in 2022.

An upgraded strike version of the Orlan-10 able to carry four high-explosive fragmentation projectiles was reportedly used in the 2022 Russian invasion of Ukraine. According to the Oryx website, at least 208 Orlan-10, 19 Orlan-20, and 16 Orlan-30 have been shot down as of February 12 2025, including by a UK-supplied Martlet missile. A version called Moskit is used for EW.

In December 2022, Colonel Yurii Solovey, head of air defense for the Ukrainian ground forces, claimed that his units had destroyed more than 580 Orlan-10s since the invasion began, and that the lack of drones affected Russian forces' ability to recon for artillery and counterbattery fire. Alternative drones were employed to fill the Orlan-10's role, but they are difficult to procure due to dependence on components originating from countries that have imposed sanctions. However, in July 2023, Russian Defense Minister Sergey Shoigu stated that the supplies of Orlan-10 and −30 drones had surged 53 times since early 2022.

On 17 October 2023, Andrii Biletskyi, commander of the Ukrainian 3rd Assault Brigade, said that the Orlan was an issue for Ukrainian forces due to its resistance to jamming and ability to help with artillery fire and reconnaissance.

On 27 April 2024, an Orlan-10 was shot down by the crew of a Ukrainian Yakovlev Yak-52 sport aircraft. As the Yak-52 is unarmed, it is believed that the drone was disabled by the Yak-52's second crew member, likely by firing at it with a machine gun from the plane as it approached the drone.

=== Syria ===
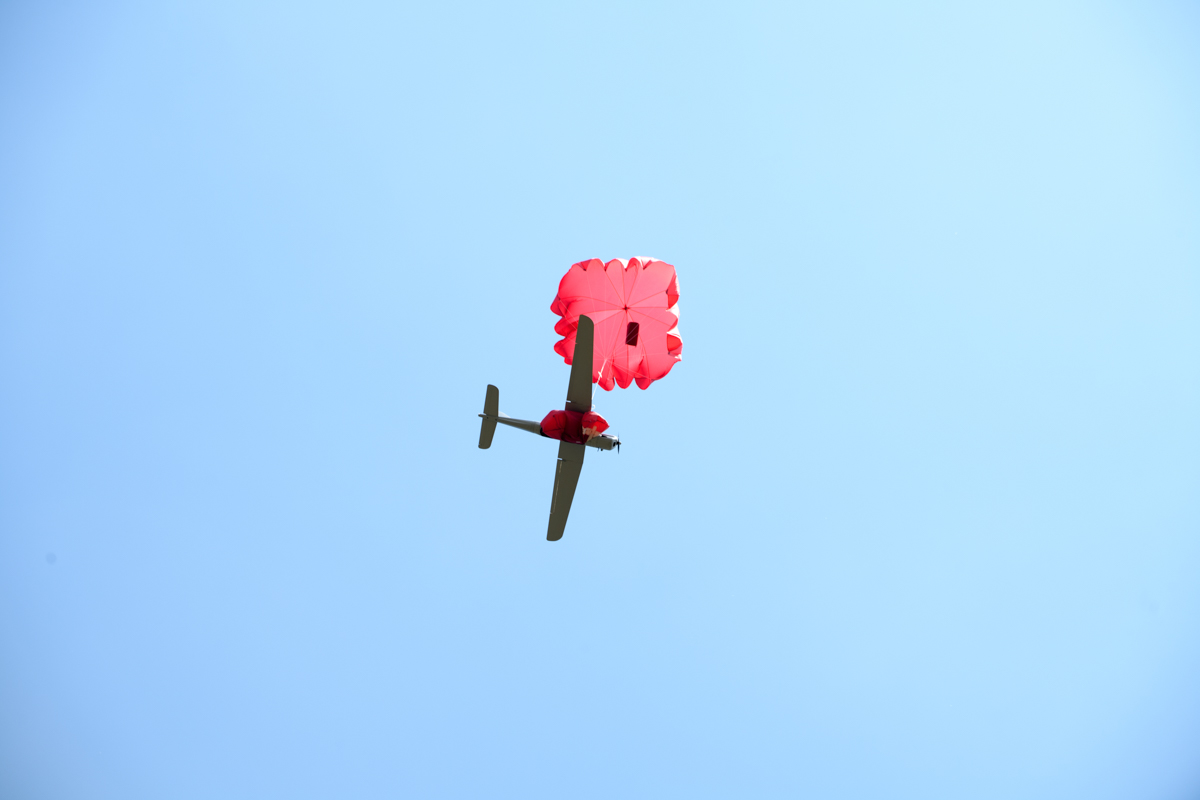
Orlan-10 drone with on-board orange parachute

The Orlan-10 was used by the Russian Ground Forces in the Syrian Civil War for either reconnaissance, collecting aerial imagery or 3D-mapping in support of humanitarian convoys and S&R operations.

In November 2015, an Orlan-10 located the surviving member of a downed Russian Su-24M2 bomber and facilitated his speedy recovery.

On 10 March 2020, an Orlan-10 drone was shot down by Syrian rebels in Suluk, Raqqa Governorate.

On 9 June 2021, an Orlan-10 killed a prominent HTS member known as Abu Khalid al-Shami.

=== Belarus ===
In early February 2022, an Orlan-10 drone crashed near Brest.

=== Romania ===
On 13 March 2022, an Orlan-10 was found on a field in Bistrița-Năsăud County, Romania. It was initially thought to be a drone owned by a private person in Romania, however it was soon identified as a Russian-made Orlan-10. The investigation is ongoing. According to the Ukrainian Air Force, the drone belongs to the Russian army.

=== Mali ===
On 16 July 2022, Islamic State in the Greater Sahara shot down an Orlan-10 in Ménaka Region operated by Wagner Group.

=== Sweden ===
On 25 February 2026, the Russian signal intelligence vessel Zhigulevsk, that at the time was being shadowed by the Swedish patrol boat Rapp in the Øresund Strait. launched a recoinassance drone towards the French aircraft carrier Charles de Gaulle, at anchor in Malmö. The unmanned aircraft was jammed and disrupted by the electronic countermeasures of the Swedish ship and disappeared from the radar, either flying back to its mothership or falling to the sea. It was later determined that the drone was most probably an Orlan-10.

== Specifications ==
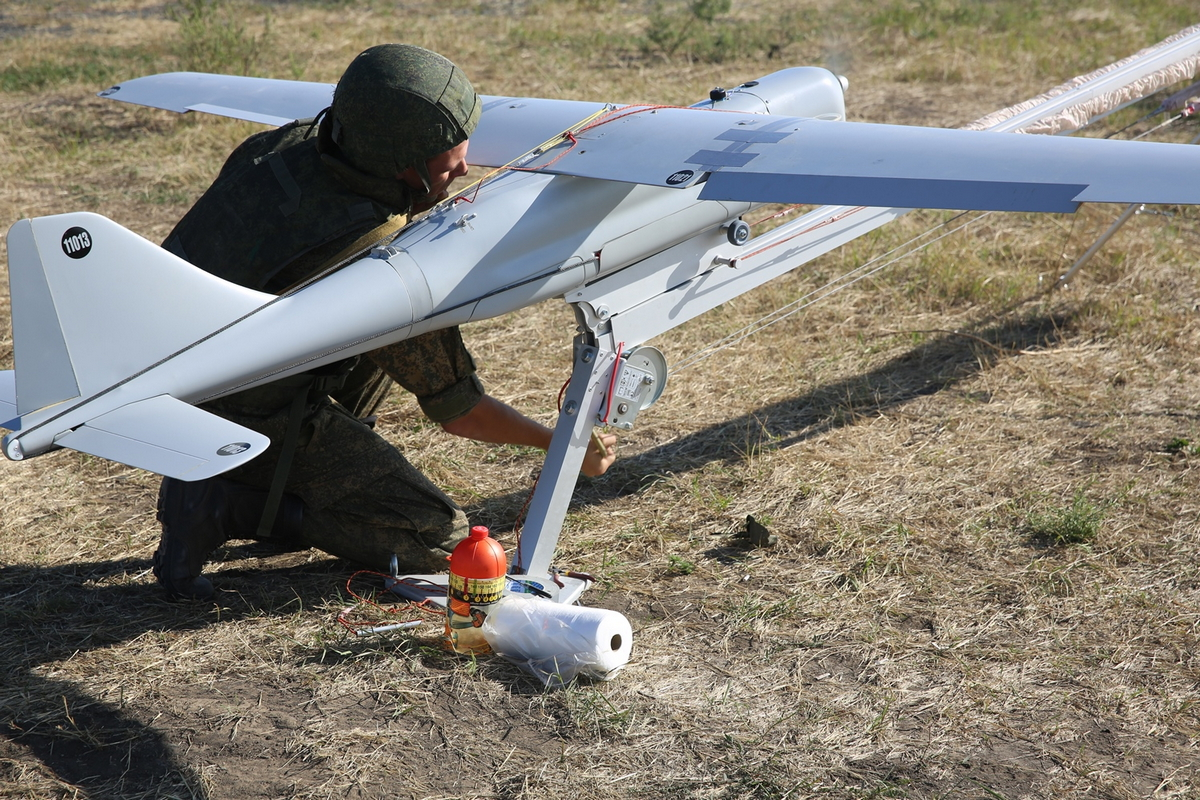
Orlan-10 before slingshot launch with soldier in attendance

The Orlan-10, while not sophisticated, is cheap and simple to operate. It flies too high to be vulnerable to short-range air defences, but is too inexpensive to justify using costly long-range defences. It provides a sufficient view of the battlefield to identify targets.

The drone is usually used in a group of two or three vehicles of the same type. The first UAVs is used for reconnaissance in a height of 1–1.5 km, the second one for EW by jammers and the third one as a transponder that transmits intelligence information.

Data from

General characteristics

- Capacity: 6 kg (13 lb) payload
- Max takeoff weight: 15 kg (33 lb)
- Launch method: folding catapult platform
- Landing method: parachute recovery
- Max. wind speed at launch: 10 m/s
- Operational temperature range: −30 to +40 °C
- Powerplant: 1 × Saito Manufacturing FA-62B single-cylinder four-stroke glow fuel piston engine, 0.71 kW (0.95 hp)

Performance

- Maximum speed: 150 km/h (93 mph, 81 kn)
- Combat range: 110 km (68 mi, 59 nmi)
- Ferry range: 600 km (370 mi, 320 nmi)
- Endurance: 16 hours
- Service ceiling: 5,000 m (16,000 ft)

Avionics

- Optical imaging: Canon EOS 750D/EOS 800D digital SLR camera with EF 85mm f/1.8 USM lens
- Thermal imaging: TM2005016-F19 Lynred PICO640gen2 infrared camera
- FPV camera

== Command ==
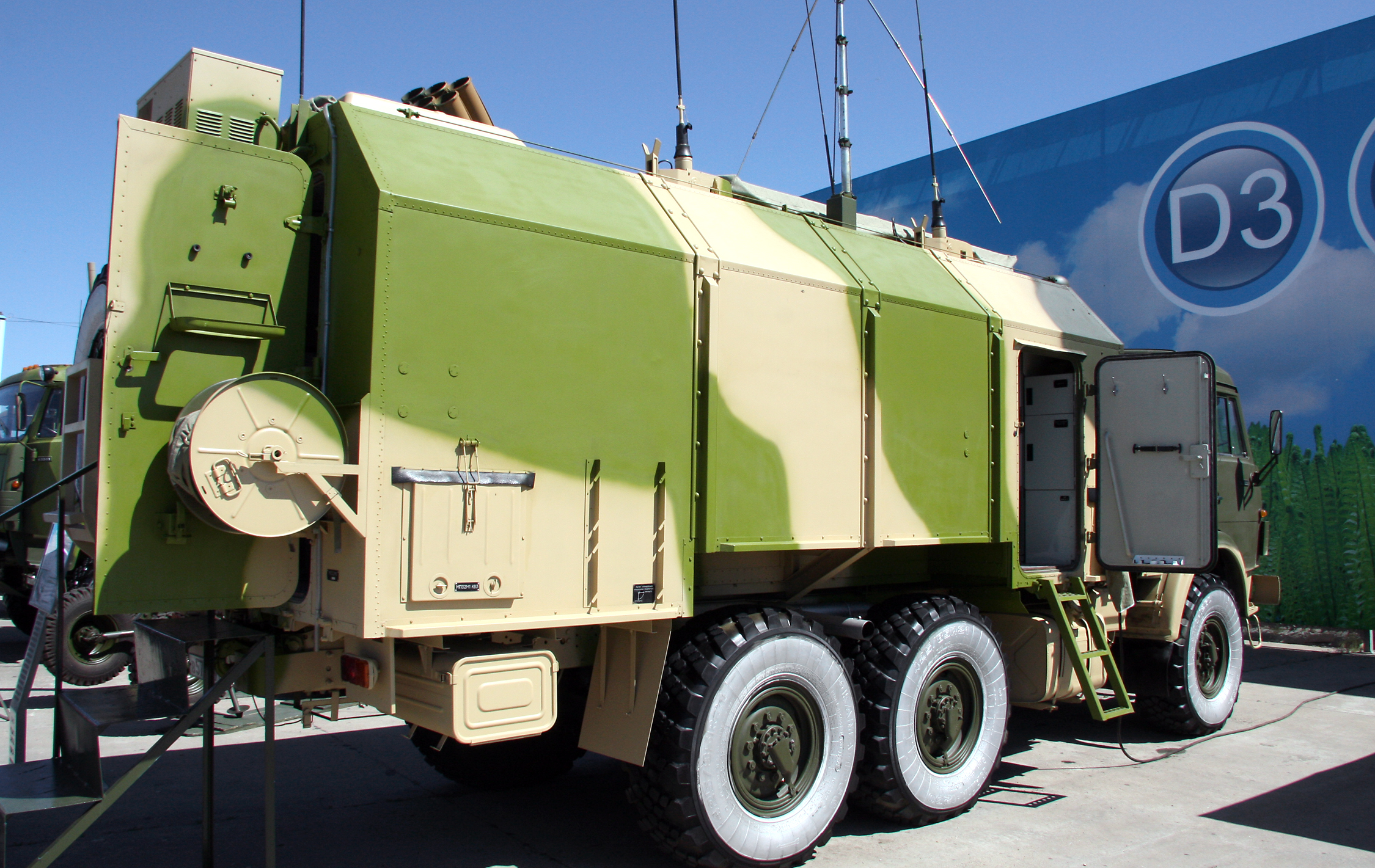
Orlan UAVs are often controlled by an MP32M1 command and control vehicle.

Orlan UAVs are operated by a mobile Ground Control Station (GCS) normally in a container of a military vehicle like the MP32M1. The GCS can control up to four aerial vehicles simultaneously. The connection to the Orlan is made by three distinct radio signals: A radio link connects the Orlan s operator on the ground with the aircraft, across which the former sends commands to the latter. This telemetry link also lets the Orlan share details of its behaviour with the operator like altitude, speed, bearing and fuel levels. The overall frequency range for Russian FPV drones is 720–1020 MHz. The Orlan-10 routinely uses frequencies of the 850–930 MHz range for the control signal. Expert say, there has emerged a trend toward operate in the 730–760 MHz range. Russians forces are seeking technological solutions that would allow them to change the frequency range during combat missions, particularly toward lower frequencies (430–600 MHz). The standard EW system Kupol of the Ukrainian forces is ineffective, because it's operates in the 850–930 MHz range.

A second radio link allows the UAV to transmit still or video imagery from its camera to GCS or to other users. Orlan may use 3, 4, and 8 GHz for transmissions.

Orlan UAVs and other Russian military drones uses the country's GLONASS constellation for navigation. The satellites transmit on a range of frequencies from 1.201 – 1.605 GHz. These Orlan receivers may also be tuneable to the PNT signals from the European Galileo and VR China's Beidou constellations (frequencies range 1.1 – 1.6 GHz).

In 2024, there were reports that Russian UAVs were being controlled using traditional radio navigation technology in order not to have to use a disturbed satellite signal. For this purpose, at least two, possibly more, Russian navigation transmitters transmit signals, whose signal transit times are evaluated and a rough position is determined using triangulation.

== Operators ==
- Armenia
- Belarus
- China (reportedly)
- Kazakhstan: Used by the Armed Forces of Kazakhstan.
- Kyrgyzstan: Used by the State Committee for National Security
- Myanmar: Used by the Tatmadaw.
- Russia
- Syria: Formerly used by the Syrian Army. One Orlan-10 captured by Free Syrian Army (FSA) fighters in 2017.
- Uzbekistan
- Venezuela

== Gallery ==
Orlan-10 system in use during the Slavic Brotherhood 2018 war games
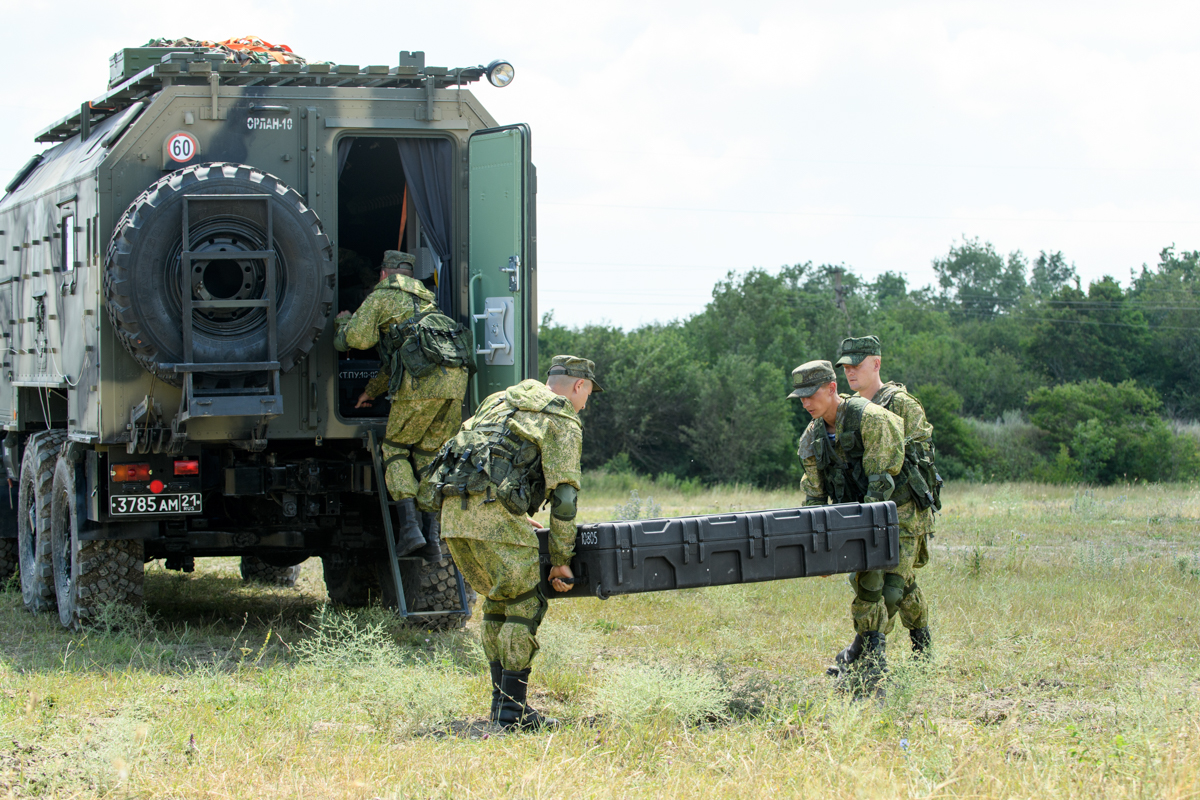

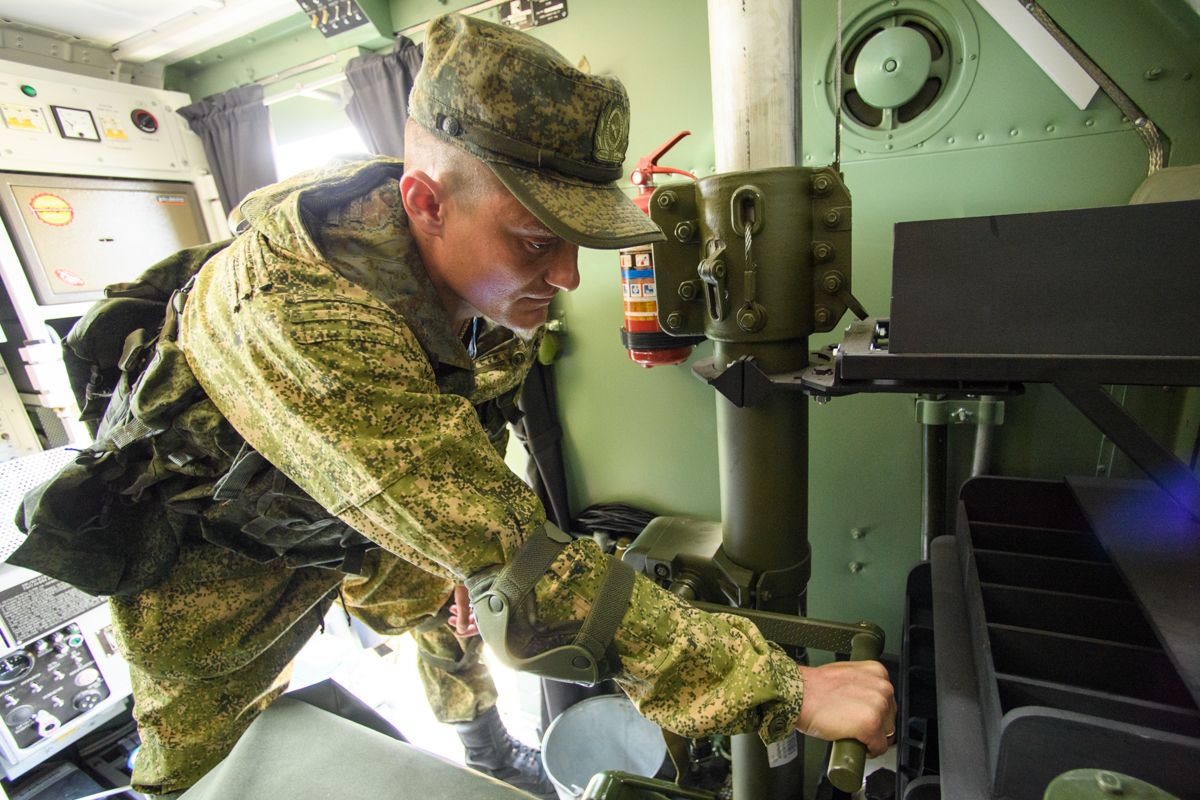

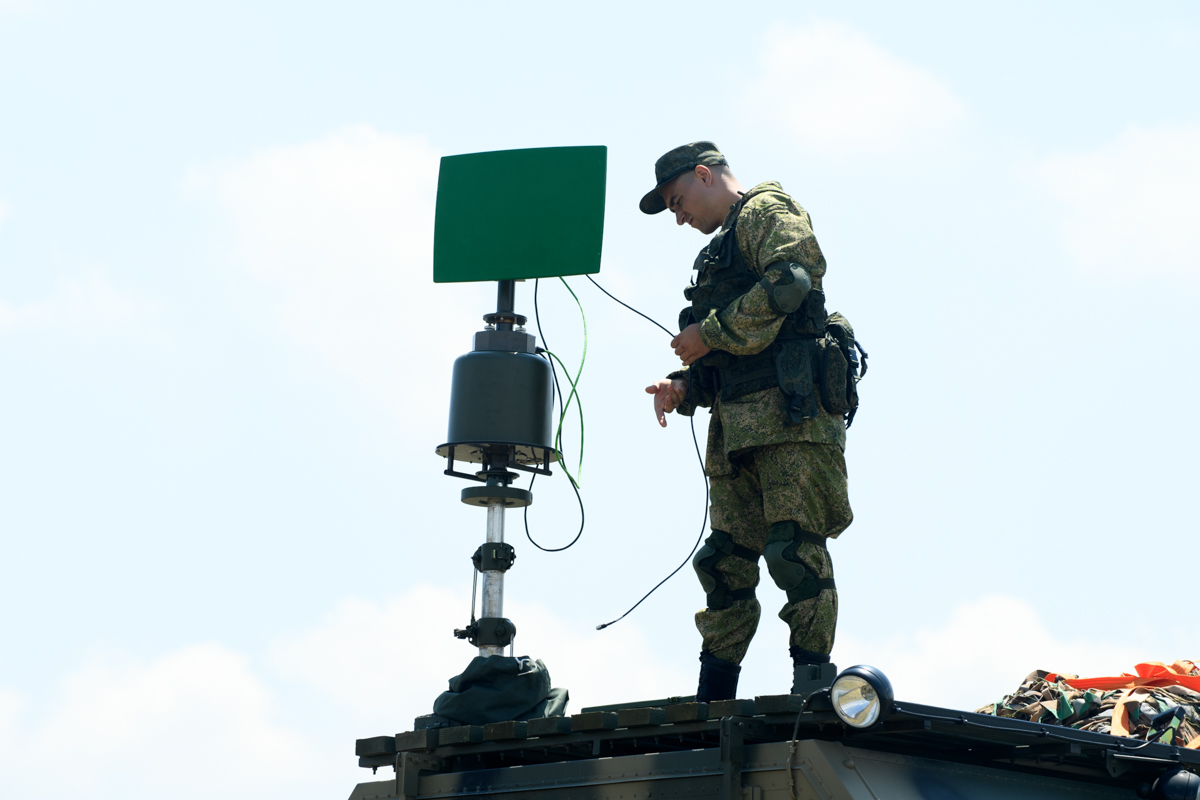

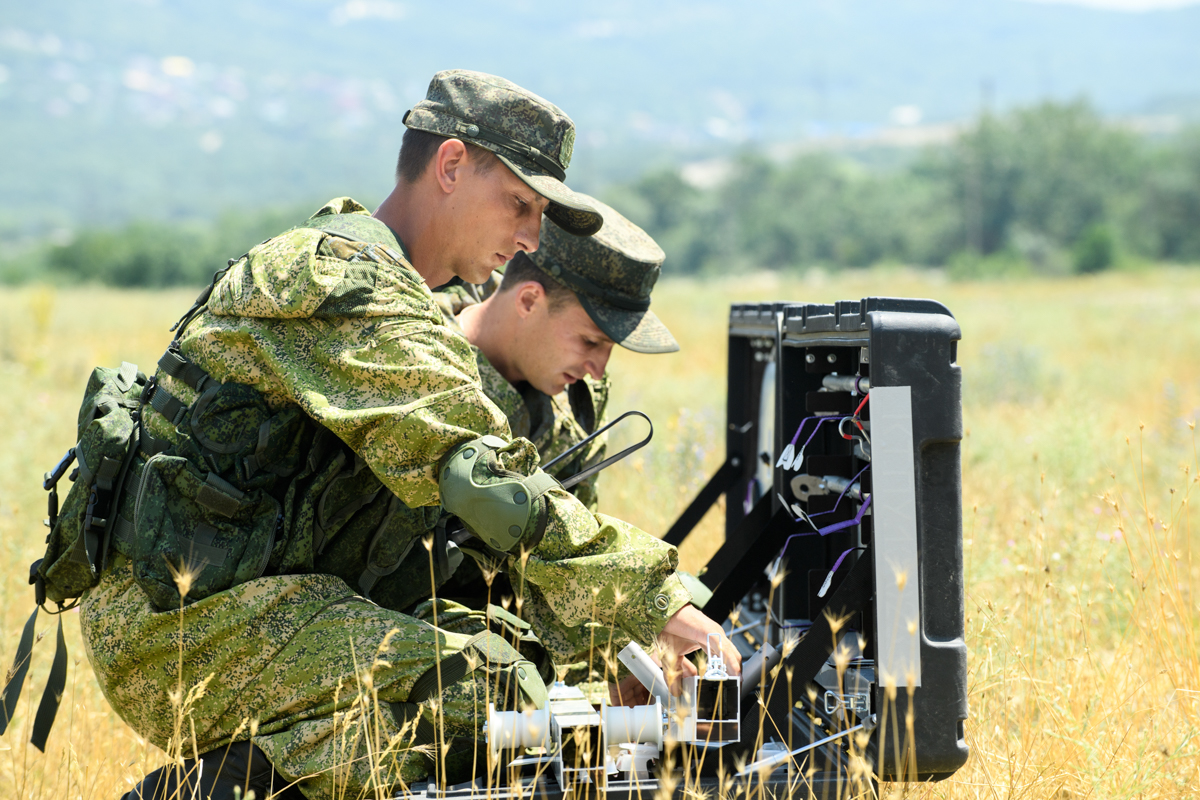

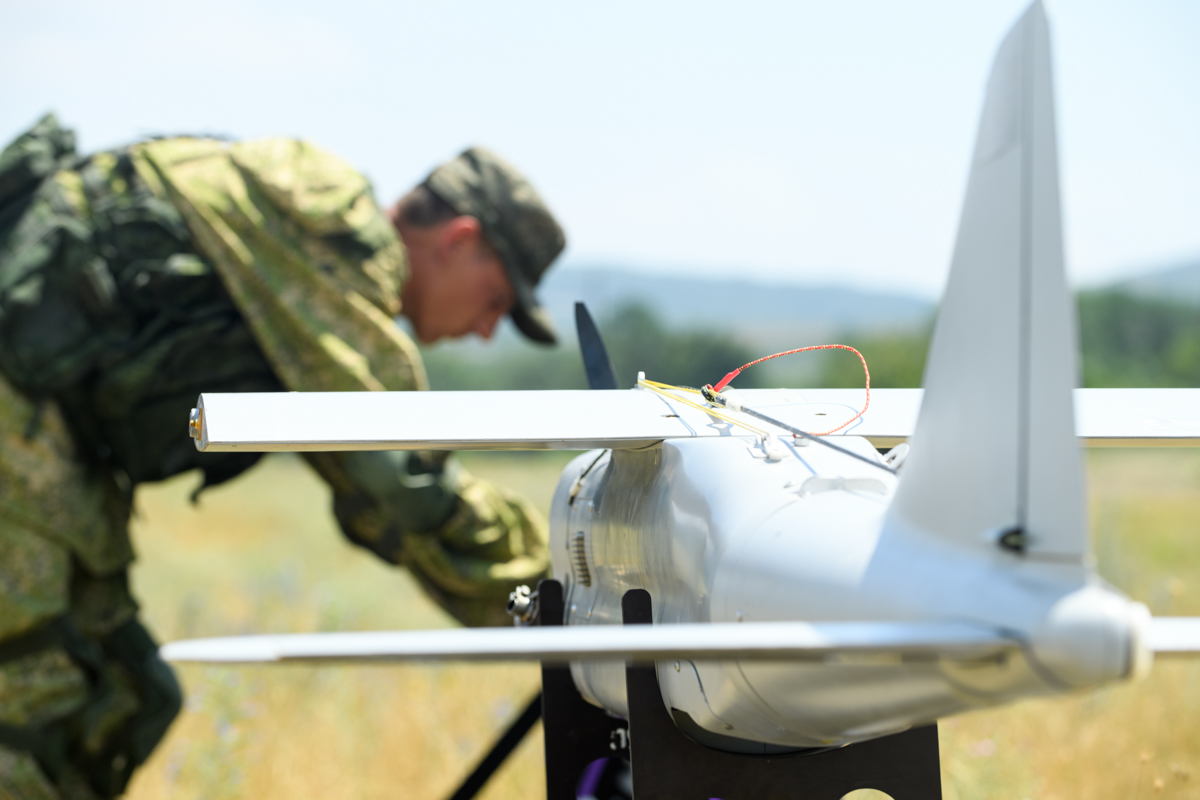

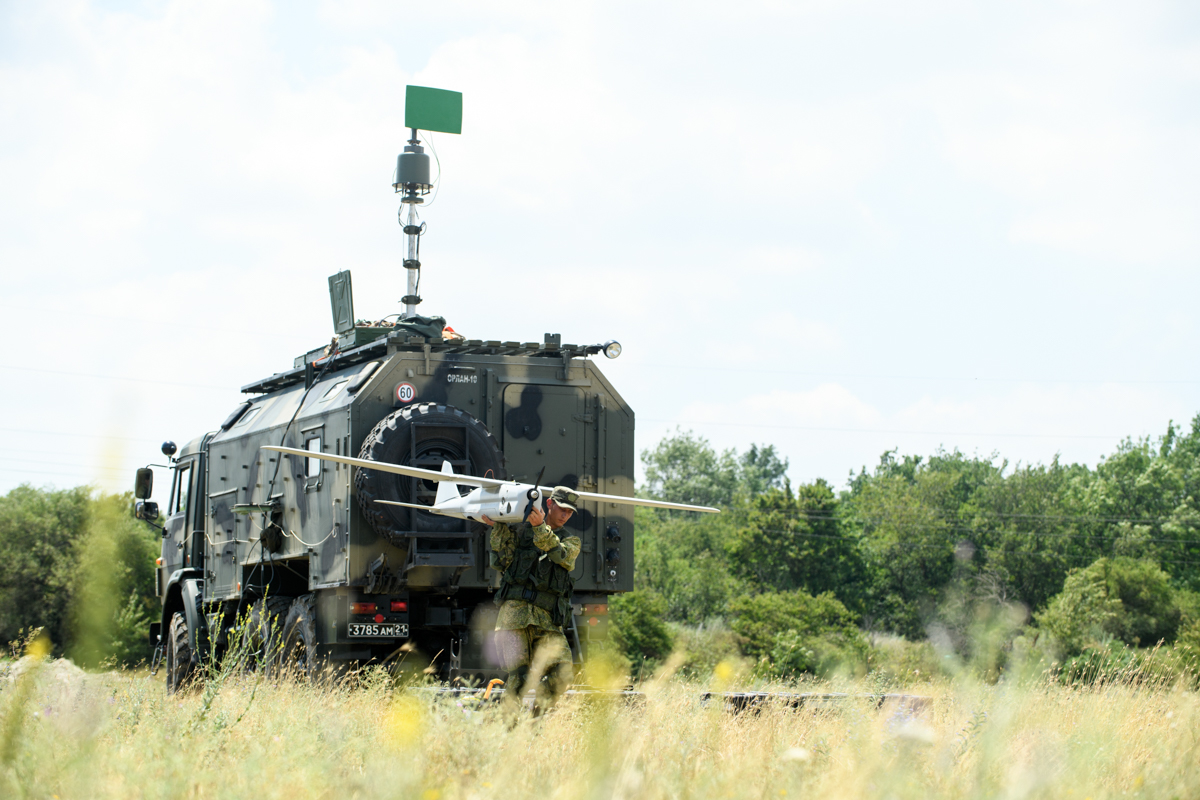

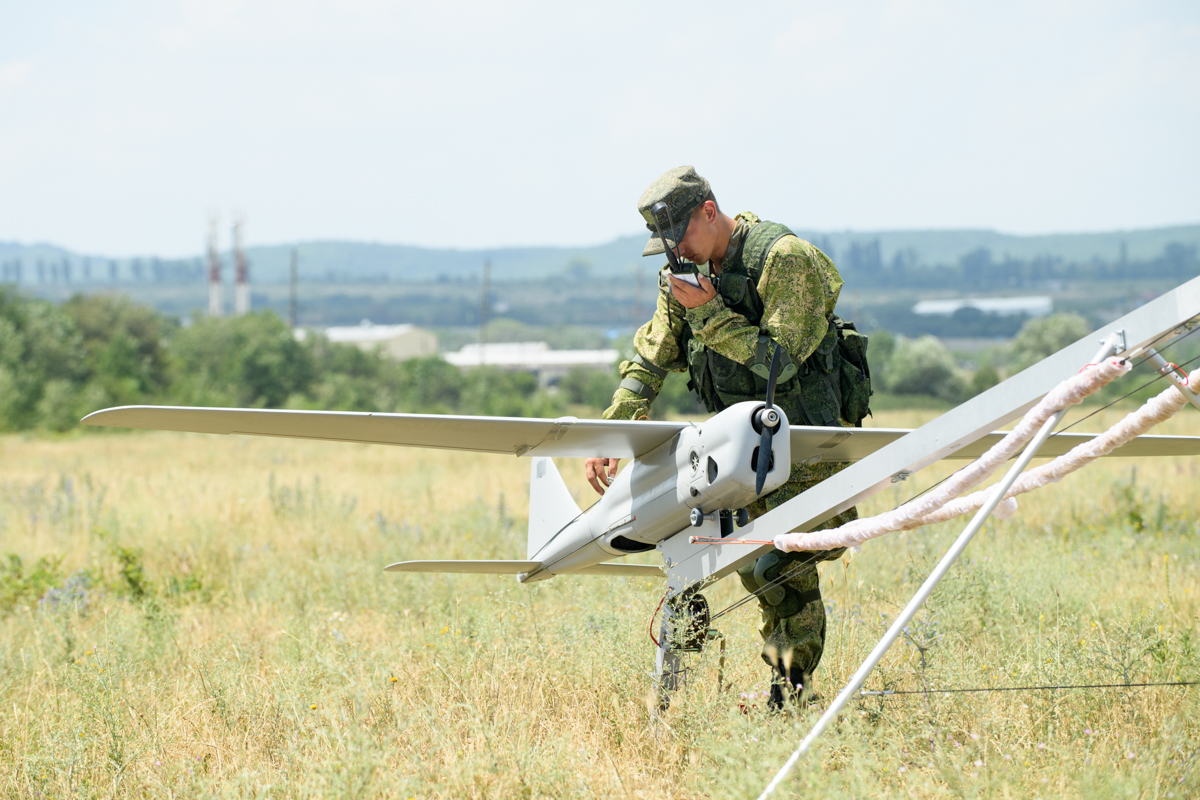

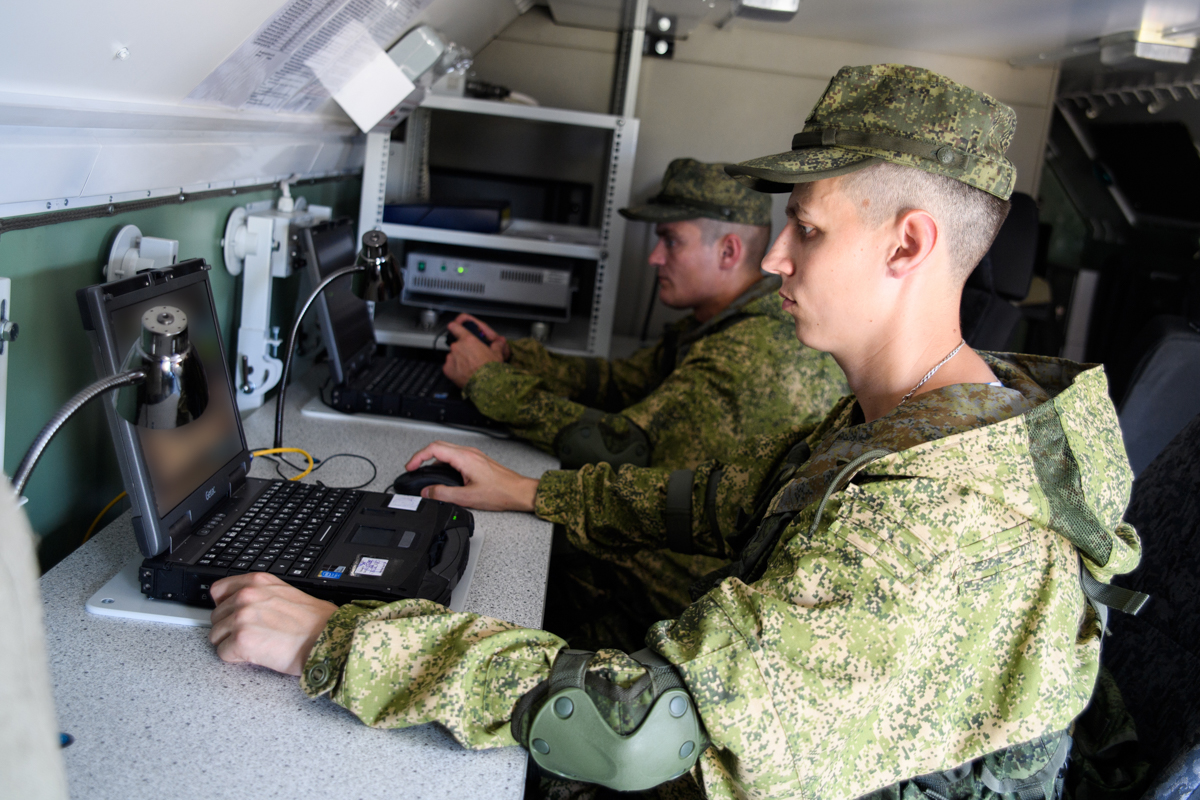

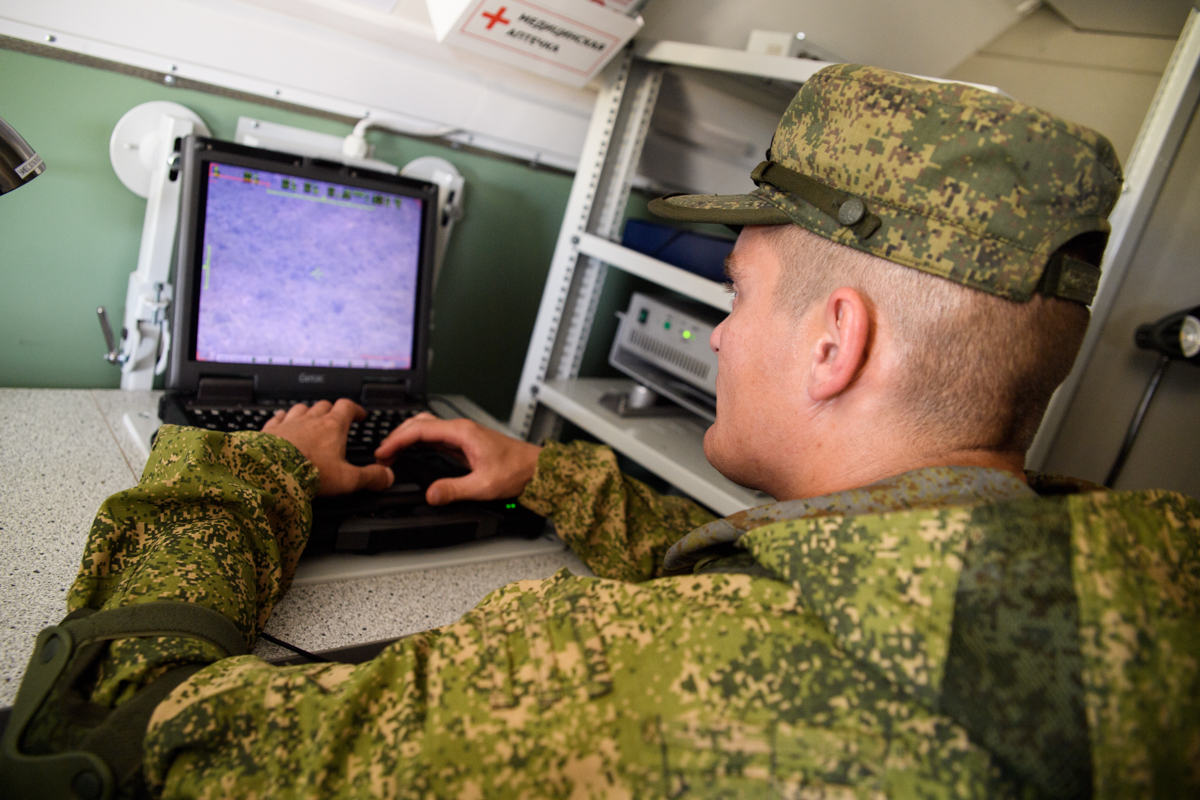

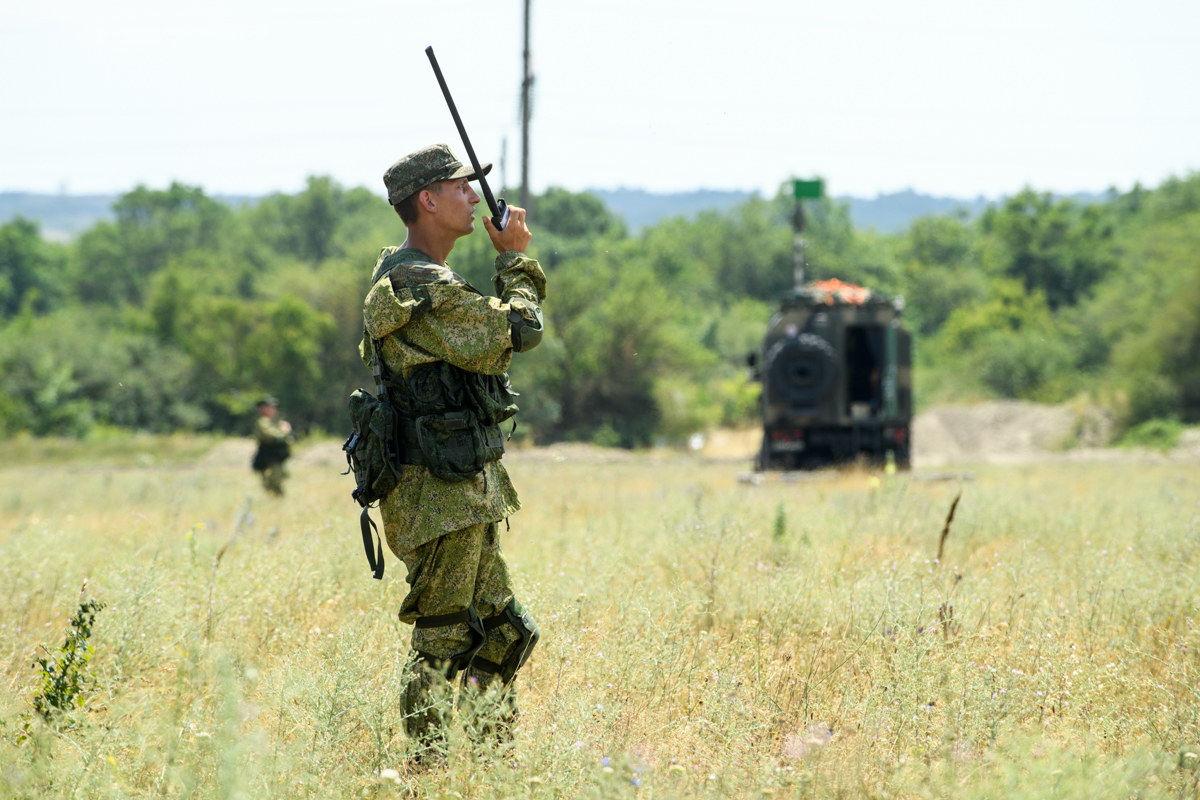

== See also ==
- Boeing Insitu ScanEagle
