= Canon EOS 750D =

2015 APS-C digital single-lens reflex camera

Canon EOS 750D EOS Rebel T6i EOS Kiss X8i
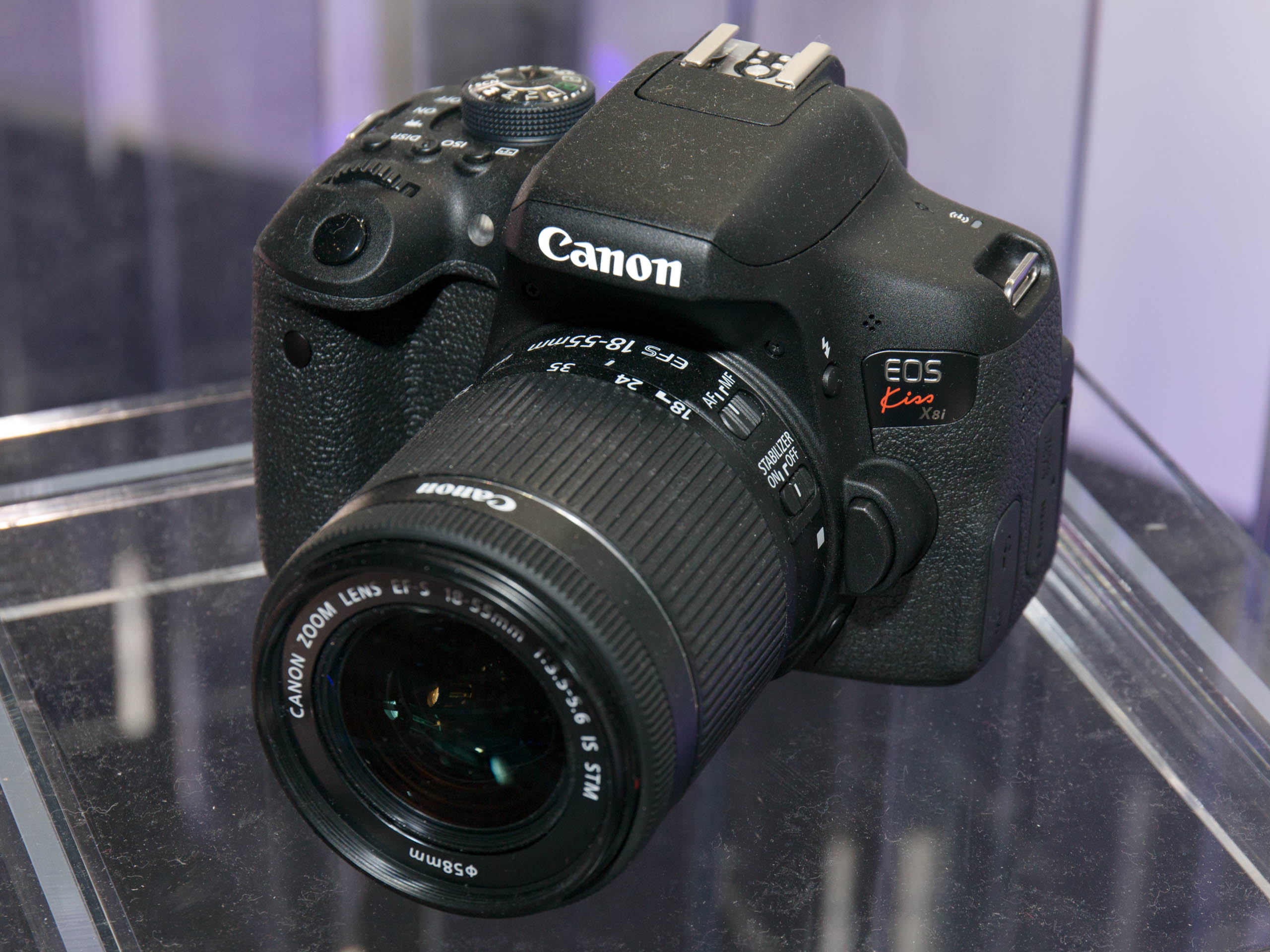

Overview
- Maker: Canon Inc.
- Type: Digital single-lens reflex camera
- Released: February 6, 2015

Lens
- Lens mount: Canon EF-S
- Lens: Interchangeable

Sensor/medium
- Sensor type: CMOS
- Sensor size: 22.3 × 14.9 mm (APS-C format)
- Maximum resolution: 6000 × 4000 pixels (3.71 μm pixel size) (24.2 effective megapixels)
- Film speed: 100 – 12800 (expandable to H: 25600)
- Storage media: SD/SDHC/SDXC card (UHS-I bus supported)

Focusing
- Focus modes: One-Shot, AI Focus, AI Servo, Live View (FlexiZone - Multi, FlexiZone - Single, Face detection, Movie Servo), Manual
- Focus areas: 19 cross-type AF points

Exposure/metering
- Exposure modes: Scene Intelligent Auto, Flash Off, Creative Auto, Portrait, Landscape, Close-up, Sports, Special Scenes (Night Portrait, Handheld Night Scene, HDR Backlight Control), Program AE, Shutter priority AE, Aperture priority AE, Manual exposure, Movie
- Exposure metering: Full aperture TTL, 63 zones iFCL SPC with 7560 pixels RGB + IR sensor
- Metering modes: Evaluative, Partial, Spot, Centre-weighted Average

Flash
- Flash: E-TTL II auto-pop-up built-in / External
- Flash bracketing: Yes

Shutter
- Shutter: Electronic focal-plane
- Shutter speed range: 1/4000 sec. - 30 sec. and Bulb; X-sync at 1/200 sec.
- Continuous shooting: 5.0 fps for 180 JPEG frames or for 7 RAW frames

Viewfinder
- Viewfinder: Eye-level pentamirror with 95% coverage and 0.82x magnification / LCD (Live View)

Image processing
- Image processor: DIGIC 6
- White balance: Auto, Daylight, Shade, Cloudy, Tungsten, White Fluorescent, Flash, Custom
- WB bracketing: Yes

General
- LCD screen: 3.0" (7.7 cm) Clear View II colour TFT vari-angle LCD touchscreen with 1,040,000 dots
- Battery: Li-Ion LP-E17 rechargeable (1040 mAh)
- Optional battery packs: BG-E18 grip allows the use of one LP-E17 battery or two LP-E17 batteries
- Dimensions: 132 mm × 101 mm × 78 mm (5.2 in × 4.0 in × 3.1 in)
- Weight: 510 g (18 oz) (body only)
- Made in: Taiwan / Japan

Chronology
- Predecessor: Canon EOS 700D
- Successor: Canon EOS 800D (for 750D); Canon EOS 77D (for 760D)

The Canon EOS 750D, known as the Rebel T6i in the Americas or as the Kiss X8i in Japan, is a 24.2 megapixels entry-mid-level digital SLR announced by Canon on February 6, 2015. As a part of the Canon EOS three-digit/Rebel line, it is the successor to the EOS 700D (Rebel T5i) and the predecessor to the EOS 800D (Rebel T7i).

The 750D was announced and released together with the 760D, a very similar model which adopts some of the ergonomic features of the more expensive 70D.

== Features ==
- 24.2 effective megapixel APS-C CMOS sensor
- 19 AF points, all cross-type at f/5.6. Center point is high precision, double cross-type at f/2.8 or faster
- DIGIC 6 image processor with 14-bit processing
- Hybrid CMOS AF III
- ISO 100 – 12800 (expandable to H: 25600)
- 95% viewfinder frame coverage with 0.82× magnification
- 1080p Full HD video recording at 24p, 25p (25 Hz), and 30p (29.97 Hz) with drop frame timing
- 720p HD video recording at 60p (59.94 Hz) and 50p (50 Hz)
- 480p ED video recording at 30p and 25p
- 5.0 frames per second continuous shooting
- 3.0" (7.7 cm) vari-angle Clear View II LCD touchscreen with 1,040,000 dots resolution.
- 3.5 mm microphone jack for external microphones or recorders
- Wi-Fi + NFC connectivity
- "Anti-flicker" (introduced on the EOS 7D Mk II) – the camera can be set to automatically delay the moment of exposure to compensate for flickering electric lighting

== 760D ==
The 760D was announced together with the EOS 750D (known as the Rebel T6s in the Americas and the 8000D in Japan). It is very similar to the 750D, but adds the following features:

- An LCD information display on top of the body, a feature never before available in the EOS xxxD/Rebel digital line. The last previous consumer-level body with an LCD was the 35mm film-era EOS 3000N/Rebel XS N.
- A quick control dial on the rear of the body, also a first for the xxxD/Rebel digital line.
- Servo AF (autofocus) in live view mode, allowing for continuous autofocus during shooting bursts. (The 750D/T6i only supports Servo AF when using the optical viewfinder.) Both 750D and 760D camera uses advance Hybrid CMOS AF III sensor and a 19-point AF phase module sensor, The Hybrid Sensor AF system gets activated when a user switches to live view shooting or records a video. All of the current Canon EF Lenses are compatible with the Canon latest Hybrid AF sensor and will do AF perfectly without an issue.

The 750D is used in the Orlan-10 drone.

== Predecessor comparison ==
The Canon EOS 750D (Rebel T6i) is the successor to the EOS 700D (Rebel T5i) with the following improvements.

- Higher Image Resolution: The T5i has a resolution of 17.9 megapixels, whereas the T6i provides 24 MP.
- More AF-Points: 19 vs 9 AF-Points.
- Lighter Body: The T6i is slightly lighter (4 percent) than the T5i.
- Built-in Wi-Fi: The T5i doesn't have built-in Wi-Fi, whereas the T6i features both Wi-Fi and NFC (Near Field Communication) technology allow the camera to connect to a compatible device to share images or enable remote control of the camera.

== Sensor issues ==
On May 8, 2015, Canon USA confirmed a sensor issue on some 750D and 760D cameras which resulted in the appearance of dark circular patterns on the captured image under certain shooting conditions. Canon provided instructions on how to identify potentially affected cameras and offered free repair to any affected camera.

The Hybrid CMOS AF III system is also prone to cause 'banding' - seven pairs of horizontal lines across the image which are particularly noticeable when the image is processed aggressively, this is particularly noticeable in astrophotography. Canon stated "Canon is able to reproduce the stripes. The stripes will appear in those areas where the pixels for the AF are located. This is causing a lower density of image pixels in those areas. This is not a lack of quality, since the effect will be seen only if heavy post-processing is applied."

Type	Sensor	Class	00	01	02	03	04	05	06	07	08	09	10	11	12	13	14	15	16	17	18	19	20	21	22	23	24	25	26
DSLR	Full-frame	Flagship				1Ds		1Ds Mk II			1Ds Mk III					1D C													
DSLR	Full-frame	Flagship				1Ds		1Ds Mk II			1Ds Mk III				1D X					1D X Mk II ^{T}			1D X Mk III ^{T}						
DSLR	APS-H	Flagship			1D			1D Mk II	1D Mk II N		1D Mk III		1D Mk IV																
DSLR	Full-frame	Professional																	5DS / 5DS R										
DSLR	Full-frame	Professional							5D			_{x} 5D Mk II			_{x} 5D Mk III					5D Mk IV ^{T}									
DSLR	Full-frame	Advanced														_{x} 6D					_{x} 6D Mk II ^{AT}								
DSLR	APS-C	Advanced											_{x} 7D					_{x} 7D Mk II											
DSLR	APS-C	Mid-range						20Da								_{x} 60Da ^{A}													
DSLR	APS-C	Mid-range		D30	D60	10D		20D	30D		40D	_{x} 50D		_{x} 60D ^{A}			_{x} 70D ^{AT}		80D ^{AT}				90D ^{AT}						
DSLR	APS-C	Mid-range																	760D ^{AT}		77D ^{AT}								
DSLR	APS-C	Entry-level					300D	350D		400D	450D	_{x} 500D	_{x} 550D	_{x} 600D ^{A}		_{x} 650D ^{AT}	_{x} 700D ^{AT}		_{x} 750D ^{AT}		800D ^{AT}			850D ^{AT}					
DSLR	APS-C	Entry-level															_{x} 100D ^{T}		_{x} 200D ^{AT}				250D ^{AT}						
DSLR	APS-C	Entry-level										1000D		_{x} 1100D			_{x} 1200D			1300D		2000D							
DSLR	APS-C	Value																				4000D							
Early models			Canon EOS DCS 5 (1995); Canon EOS DCS 3 (1995); Canon EOS DCS 1 (1995); Canon EOS D2000 (1998); Canon EOS D6000 (1998)																										
Type	Sensor	Spec																											
Type	Sensor	Spec	00	01	02	03	04	05	06	07	08	09	10	11	12	13	14	15	16	17	18	19	20	21	22	23	24	25	26
