= Canon EOS 800D =

2017 APS-C digital single-lens reflex camera

Canon EOS 800D Canon EOS Rebel T7i Canon EOS Kiss X9i
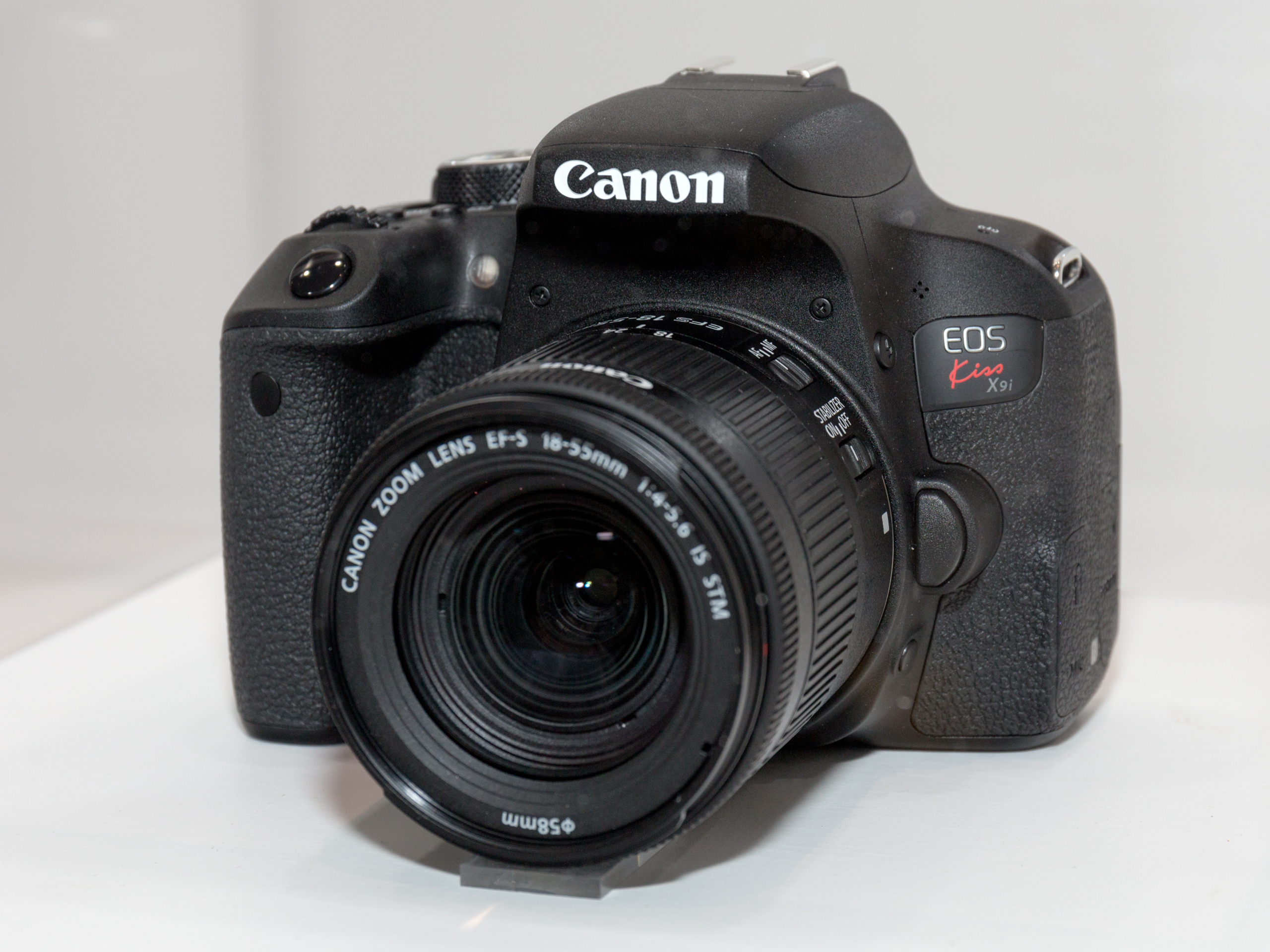
- EOS Kiss X9i + EF-S 18-55mm F4-5.6 IS STM

Overview
- Type: Digital single-lens reflex camera
- Intro price: US$750

Lens
- Lens mount: Canon EF-S
- Lens: Interchangeable

Sensor/medium
- Sensor type: CMOS
- Sensor size: 22.3 × 14.9 mm (APS-C format)
- Maximum resolution: 6000 × 4000 pixels (3.72 μm pixel size) (approx. 24.2 effective megapixels)
- Film speed: 100–25600
- Storage media: SD/SDHC/SDXC card (UHS-I bus supported)

Focusing
- Focus modes: One-Shot, AI Focus, AI Servo, Live View (FlexiZone - Multi, FlexiZone - Single, Face detection, Movie Servo)
- Focus areas: 45 cross-type AF points
- Focus bracketing: N/A

Exposure/metering
- Exposure modes: Scene Intelligent Auto, Flash Off, Creative Auto, Special Scene (Group Photo Kids, Food, Candlelight, Night Portrait, Handheld Night Scene, HDR Backlight Control, Portrait, Landscape, Close-up, Sports), Creative Filters, Program AE, Shutter priority AE, Aperture priority AE, Manual exposure, Movie
- Exposure metering: TTL, full aperture, 63 zones sensor with 7560 pixels RGB + IR sensor
- Metering modes: Evaluative, Partial, Spot, Centre-weighted Average

Flash
- Flash: E-TTL II auto-pop-up built-in / External
- Flash bracketing: N/A

Shutter
- Shutter: Electronic focal-plane
- Shutter speed range: 1/4000 s – 30 s, Bulb; X-sync at 1/200 s
- Continuous shooting: Up to 6 fps (4.5 fps in Live view mode)

Viewfinder
- Viewfinder: Optical pentamirror with 95% coverage and 0.82× magnification / LiveView LCD

Image processing
- Image processor: DIGIC 7
- White balance: Auto, Daylight, Shade, Cloudy, Tungsten, White Fluorescent, Flash, Custom
- WB bracketing: Yes

General
- LCD screen: 3.0" (7.7 cm) Clear View II colour TFT vari-angle LCD touchscreen with 1,040,000 dots
- Battery: Li-Ion LP-E17 rechargeable (1040 mAh); 600 shots (CIPA rating)
- Dimensions: 131 × 99.9 × 76.2 mm (5.16 × 3.94 × 2.99″) (W × H × D)
- Weight: 485 g (17.1 oz) (body only)
- Made in: Japan

Chronology
- Predecessor: Canon EOS 750D
- Successor: Canon EOS 850D

The Canon EOS 800D, known in the Americas as the EOS Rebel T7i and in Japan as the EOS Kiss X9i, is a digital single-lens reflex camera announced by Canon on February 14, 2017. It is the successor to the EOS 750D (Rebel T6i) and the predecessor to the EOS 850D (Rebel T8i).

The camera is aimed at amateur photographers.

== Main features ==
Compared to the EOS 750D/Rebel T6i, several modifications were made, including:

- New 24.2-megapixel CMOS sensor with Dual Pixel CMOS AF, instead of Hybrid CMOS AF III.
- 45 cross-type AF points, compared to 19.
- DIGIC 7, standard ISO 100–25600, H:51200 (DIGIC 6, ISO 100–12800, H:25600 on the 760D)
- High-speed Continuous Shooting at up to 6.0 fps
- Built-in Bluetooth.
- 1080p at 60/50 fps video recording capability
- Movie Electronic IS
- Built-in HDR and time-lapse recording capability (new software)
- 15 Custom Functions with 44 settings settable with the camera
- Menu display: guided (default), the beginner-friendly graphical user interface also found on the 77D, or standard
- Compatible with Bluetooth remote BR-E1

== Predecessor comparison ==
The Canon EOS Rebel T7i/800D is the successor to the Canon EOS Rebel T6i/750D with the following improvements.

- Better maximum video frame rate: 1080p/60fps vs 1080p/30fps.
- More AF Points: 45 vs 19 points.
- Longer battery life: 600 vs 440 Shots.
- Faster continuous shooting (burst mode): 6.0 FPS vs 4.8 FPS.
- Bigger RAW Buffer: 24 vs 6 Shots.
- Higher extended ISO: 51200 vs 25600 ISO.
- Lighter weight: 532g vs 555g (23g lighter).

Type	Sensor	Class	00	01	02	03	04	05	06	07	08	09	10	11	12	13	14	15	16	17	18	19	20	21	22	23	24	25	26
DSLR	Full-frame	Flagship				1Ds		1Ds Mk II			1Ds Mk III					1D C													
DSLR	Full-frame	Flagship				1Ds		1Ds Mk II			1Ds Mk III				1D X					1D X Mk II ^{T}			1D X Mk III ^{T}						
DSLR	APS-H	Flagship			1D			1D Mk II	1D Mk II N		1D Mk III		1D Mk IV																
DSLR	Full-frame	Professional																	5DS / 5DS R										
DSLR	Full-frame	Professional							5D			_{x} 5D Mk II			_{x} 5D Mk III					5D Mk IV ^{T}									
DSLR	Full-frame	Advanced														_{x} 6D					_{x} 6D Mk II ^{AT}								
DSLR	APS-C	Advanced											_{x} 7D					_{x} 7D Mk II											
DSLR	APS-C	Mid-range						20Da								_{x} 60Da ^{A}													
DSLR	APS-C	Mid-range		D30	D60	10D		20D	30D		40D	_{x} 50D		_{x} 60D ^{A}			_{x} 70D ^{AT}		80D ^{AT}				90D ^{AT}						
DSLR	APS-C	Mid-range																	760D ^{AT}		77D ^{AT}								
DSLR	APS-C	Entry-level					300D	350D		400D	450D	_{x} 500D	_{x} 550D	_{x} 600D ^{A}		_{x} 650D ^{AT}	_{x} 700D ^{AT}		_{x} 750D ^{AT}		800D ^{AT}			850D ^{AT}					
DSLR	APS-C	Entry-level															_{x} 100D ^{T}		_{x} 200D ^{AT}				250D ^{AT}						
DSLR	APS-C	Entry-level										1000D		_{x} 1100D			_{x} 1200D			1300D		2000D							
DSLR	APS-C	Value																				4000D							
Early models			Canon EOS DCS 5 (1995); Canon EOS DCS 3 (1995); Canon EOS DCS 1 (1995); Canon EOS D2000 (1998); Canon EOS D6000 (1998)																										
Type	Sensor	Spec																											
Type	Sensor	Spec	00	01	02	03	04	05	06	07	08	09	10	11	12	13	14	15	16	17	18	19	20	21	22	23	24	25	26
