= Canon EOS 77D =

2017 APS-C digital single-lens reflex camera

Canon EOS 77D Canon EOS 9000D
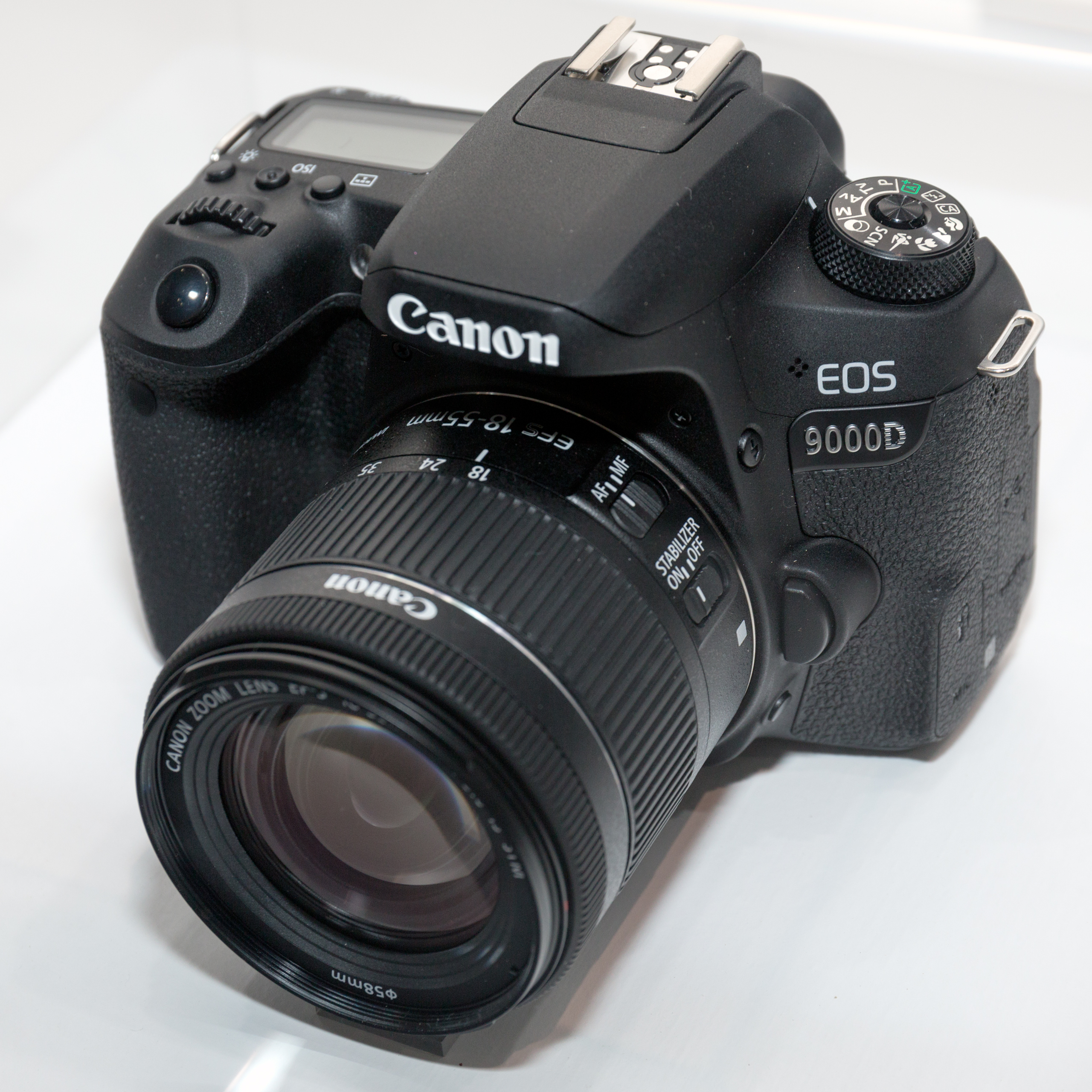

Overview
- Type: Digital single-lens reflex camera
- Intro price: US$900

Lens
- Lens mount: Canon EF-S
- Lens: Interchangeable

Sensor/medium
- Sensor type: CMOS
- Sensor size: 22.3 × 14.9 mm (APS-C format)
- Maximum resolution: 6000 × 4000 pixels (3.72 μm pixel size) (approx. 24.2 effective megapixels)
- Film speed: 100–25600
- Storage media: SD/SDHC/SDXC card (UHS-I bus supported)

Focusing
- Focus modes: One-Shot, AI Focus, AI Servo, Live View (FlexiZone - Multi, FlexiZone - Single, Face detection, Movie Servo)
- Focus areas: 45 cross-type AF points
- Focus bracketing: N/A

Exposure/metering
- Exposure modes: Scene Intelligent Auto, Flash Off, Creative Auto, Special Scene (Group Photo Kids, Food, Candlelight, Night Portrait, Handheld Night Scene, HDR Backlight Control, Portrait, Landscape, Close-up, Sports), Creative Filters, Program AE, Shutter priority AE, Aperture priority AE, Manual exposure, Movie
- Exposure metering: TTL, full aperture, 63 zones sensor with 7560 pixels RGB + IR sensor
- Metering modes: Evaluative, Partial, Spot, Centre-weighted Average

Flash
- Flash: E-TTL II auto-pop-up built-in / External
- Flash bracketing: N/A

Shutter
- Shutter: Electronic focal-plane
- Shutter speed range: 1/4000 s – 30 s, Bulb; X-sync at 1/200 s
- Continuous shooting: Up to 6 fps (at 1/500 s or faster) (4.5 fps in Live view mode)

Viewfinder
- Viewfinder: Optical pentamirror with 95% coverage and 0.82× magnification / LiveView LCD

Image processing
- Image processor: DIGIC 7
- White balance: Auto, Daylight, Shade, Cloudy, Tungsten, White Fluorescent, Flash, Custom
- WB bracketing: Yes

General
- Video recording: 1920 x 1080 (59.94, 29.97, 25, 23.98 fps) 1280 x 720 (59.94, 50, 29.97 fps) 640 x 480 (29.97, 25 fps)
- LCD screen: 3.0" (7.7 cm) Clear View II colour TFT vari-angle LCD touchscreen with 1,040,000 dots
- Battery: Li-Ion LP-E17 rechargeable (1800 mAh); 600 shots (CIPA rating)
- Dimensions: 131×100×76 mm (5.2×3.9×3.0 in) (5.16 * 3.94 * 2.99″) (W * H * D)
- Weight: 493 g (17.4 oz) (body only)
- Made in: Japan

Chronology
- Predecessor: Canon EOS 760D
- Successor: Canon EOS 90D

The Canon EOS 77D, known in Japan as the EOS 9000D, is a digital single-lens reflex camera announced by Canon on February 14, 2017. It has a body-only MSRP of US$899.99, which is more expensive than Canon EOS 760D, which it replaces. The camera can be purchased as a body-only, as kit with the 18-55mm IS STM lens at US$1,049, with the new 18-135mm IS USM lens at US$1,499.

According to Canon's U.S. subsidiary, the camera "represents a new category of advanced amateur EOS cameras, a step above the Rebel series." However, at least one reviewer considered the 77D to be a part of the Rebel line for all practical purposes. The camera features excellent core specs and its sensor is the same as the one in the Canon 80D. The biggest differences between the 80D and 77D are that the 77D has a Digic 7 engine, Movie Electronic IS (electronic stabilisation for movies) and bluetooth, the 80D has better weather sealing, pentaprism viewfinder and has Focus Microadjustment (AFMA). The 77D includes a similar but not identical layout to the EOS 80D. It has the same twin control dials, dedicated AF-ON button and top-plate LCD as in the 80D.

The 77D is geared toward the semi-pro crowd. Canon does not offer a battery grip for this model, although some aftermarket grips are available, with the shutter button working via an external cable.

== Main features ==
New features over the EOS 760D are:

- New 24.2-megapixel CMOS sensor with Dual Pixel CMOS AF, instead of Hybrid CMOS AF III.
  - Canon released the Dual Pixel CMOS AF version in EOS 77D, EOS 80D, EOS 200D, EOS 800D, and also M6 it is the world's fastest AF focusing speed of 0.03 second.
- 45 cross-type AF points, compared to 19.
- DIGIC 7, standard ISO 100–25600, H:51200 (DIGIC 6, ISO 100–12800, H:25600 on the 760D)
- High-speed Continuous Shooting at up to 6.0 fps
- Built-in NFC, and Bluetooth.
- 1080p at 60/50 fps video recording capability
- Movie Electronic IS (electronic stabilisation for movies)
- Built-in HDR and time-lapse recording capability
- Inherited AF-ON button from mid-line and pro-line.
- 15 Custom Functions with 44 settings settable with the camera
- Menu display: standard (default) or guided, a beginner-friendly graphical user interface
- Compatible with Bluetooth remote BR-E1

== Gallery ==
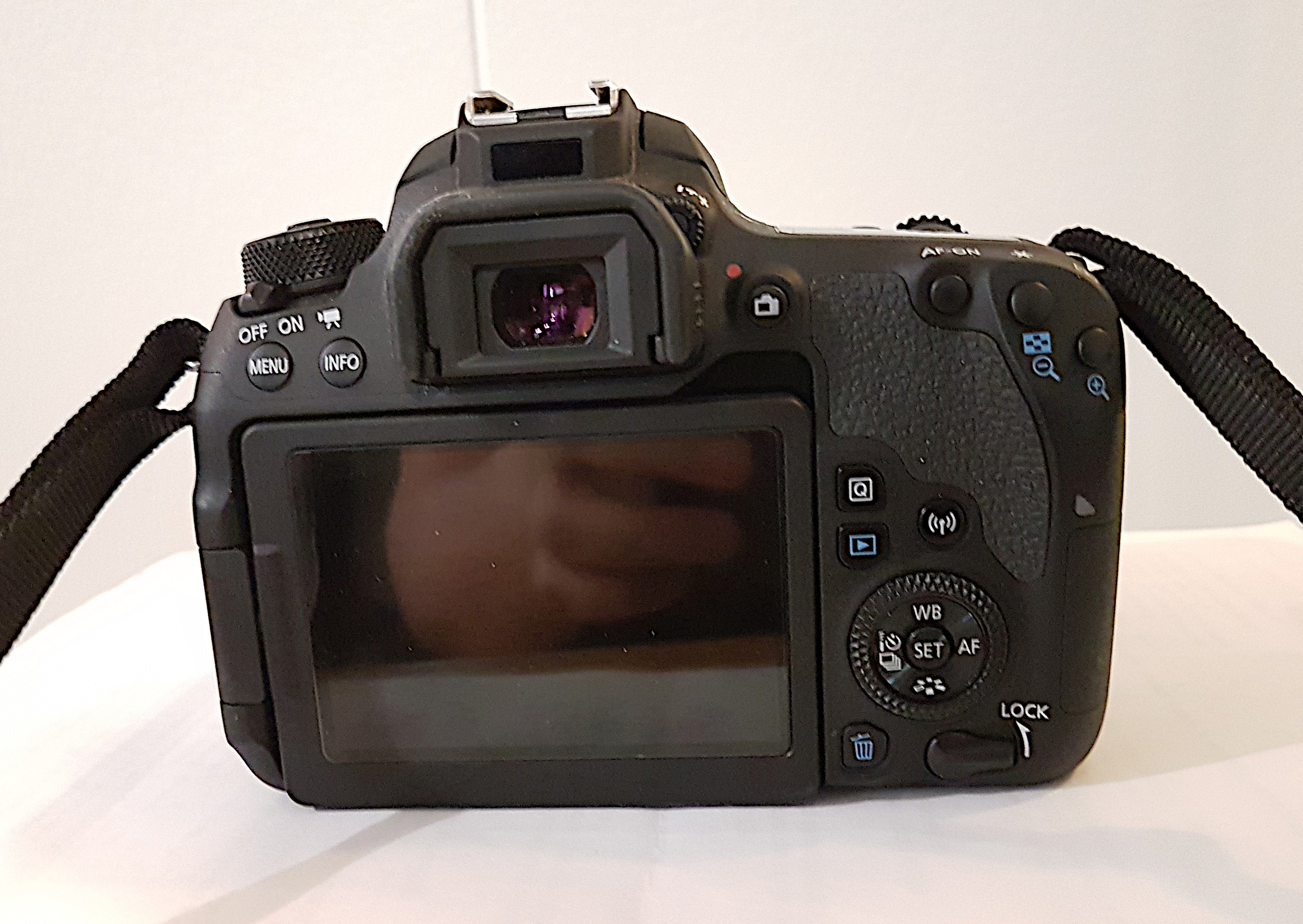
Back view

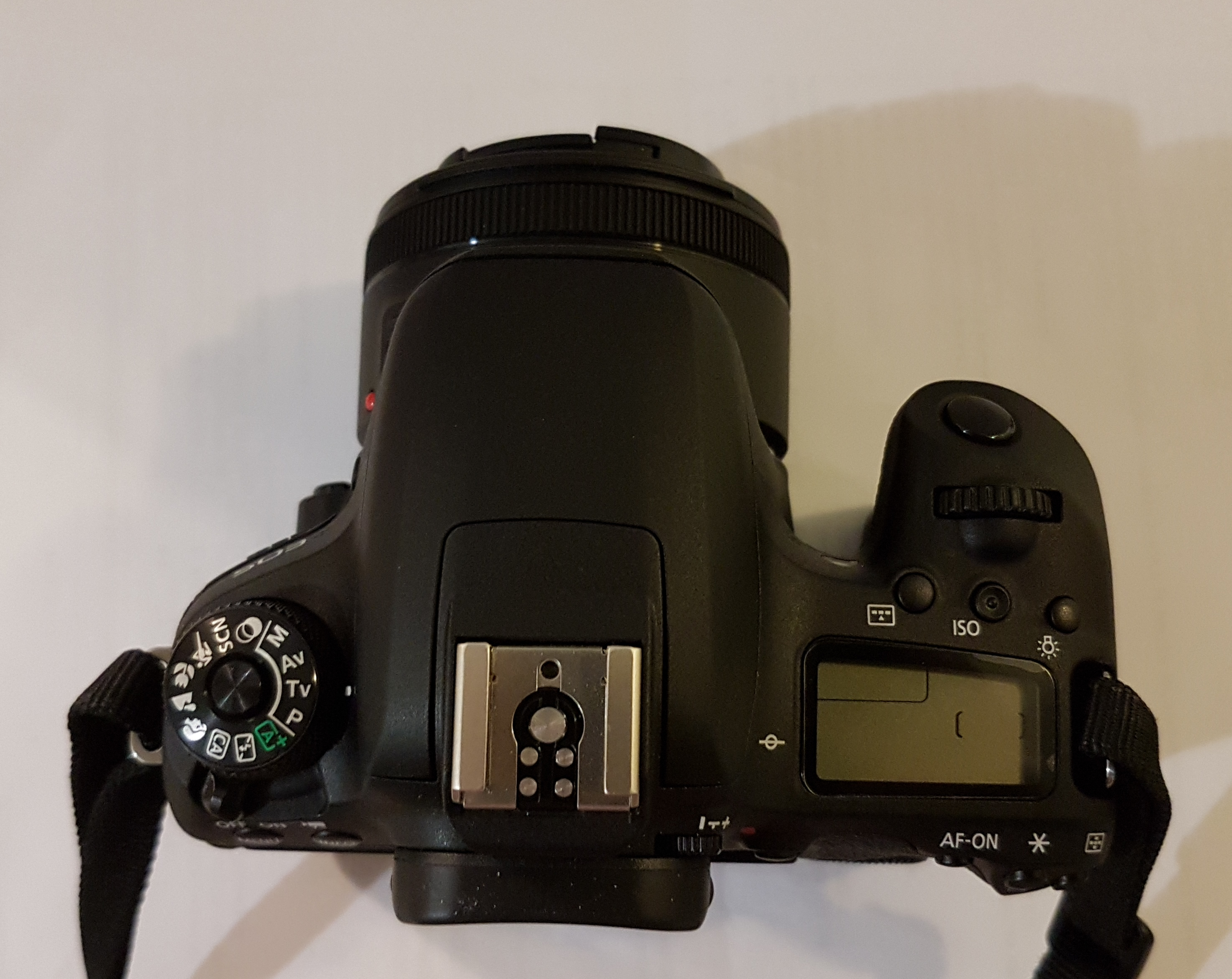
Top view

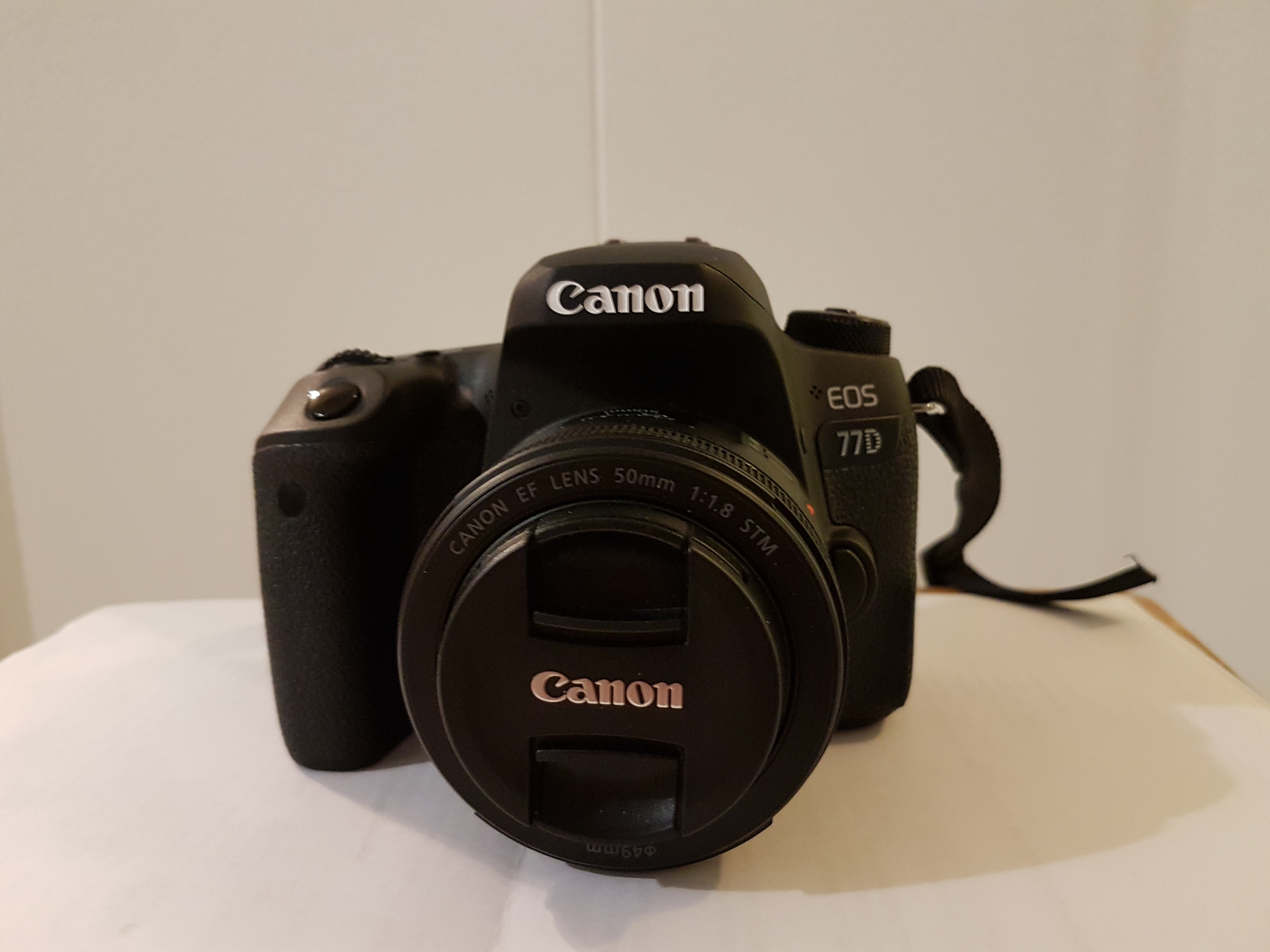
77D with mounted 50mm f/1.8 STM

Type	Sensor	Class	00	01	02	03	04	05	06	07	08	09	10	11	12	13	14	15	16	17	18	19	20	21	22	23	24	25	26
DSLR	Full-frame	Flagship				1Ds		1Ds Mk II			1Ds Mk III					1D C													
DSLR	Full-frame	Flagship				1Ds		1Ds Mk II			1Ds Mk III				1D X					1D X Mk II ^{T}			1D X Mk III ^{T}						
DSLR	APS-H	Flagship			1D			1D Mk II	1D Mk II N		1D Mk III		1D Mk IV																
DSLR	Full-frame	Professional																	5DS / 5DS R										
DSLR	Full-frame	Professional							5D			_{x} 5D Mk II			_{x} 5D Mk III					5D Mk IV ^{T}									
DSLR	Full-frame	Advanced														_{x} 6D					_{x} 6D Mk II ^{AT}								
DSLR	APS-C	Advanced											_{x} 7D					_{x} 7D Mk II											
DSLR	APS-C	Mid-range						20Da								_{x} 60Da ^{A}													
DSLR	APS-C	Mid-range		D30	D60	10D		20D	30D		40D	_{x} 50D		_{x} 60D ^{A}			_{x} 70D ^{AT}		80D ^{AT}				90D ^{AT}						
DSLR	APS-C	Mid-range																	760D ^{AT}		77D ^{AT}								
DSLR	APS-C	Entry-level					300D	350D		400D	450D	_{x} 500D	_{x} 550D	_{x} 600D ^{A}		_{x} 650D ^{AT}	_{x} 700D ^{AT}		_{x} 750D ^{AT}		800D ^{AT}			850D ^{AT}					
DSLR	APS-C	Entry-level															_{x} 100D ^{T}		_{x} 200D ^{AT}				250D ^{AT}						
DSLR	APS-C	Entry-level										1000D		_{x} 1100D			_{x} 1200D			1300D		2000D							
DSLR	APS-C	Value																				4000D							
Early models			Canon EOS DCS 5 (1995); Canon EOS DCS 3 (1995); Canon EOS DCS 1 (1995); Canon EOS D2000 (1998); Canon EOS D6000 (1998)																										
Type	Sensor	Spec																											
Type	Sensor	Spec	00	01	02	03	04	05	06	07	08	09	10	11	12	13	14	15	16	17	18	19	20	21	22	23	24	25	26
