= Canon MP-E 65mm f/2.8 1–5x Macro =

Canon SLR EF mount macro lens

MP-E65mm f/2.8 1-5x Macro Photo
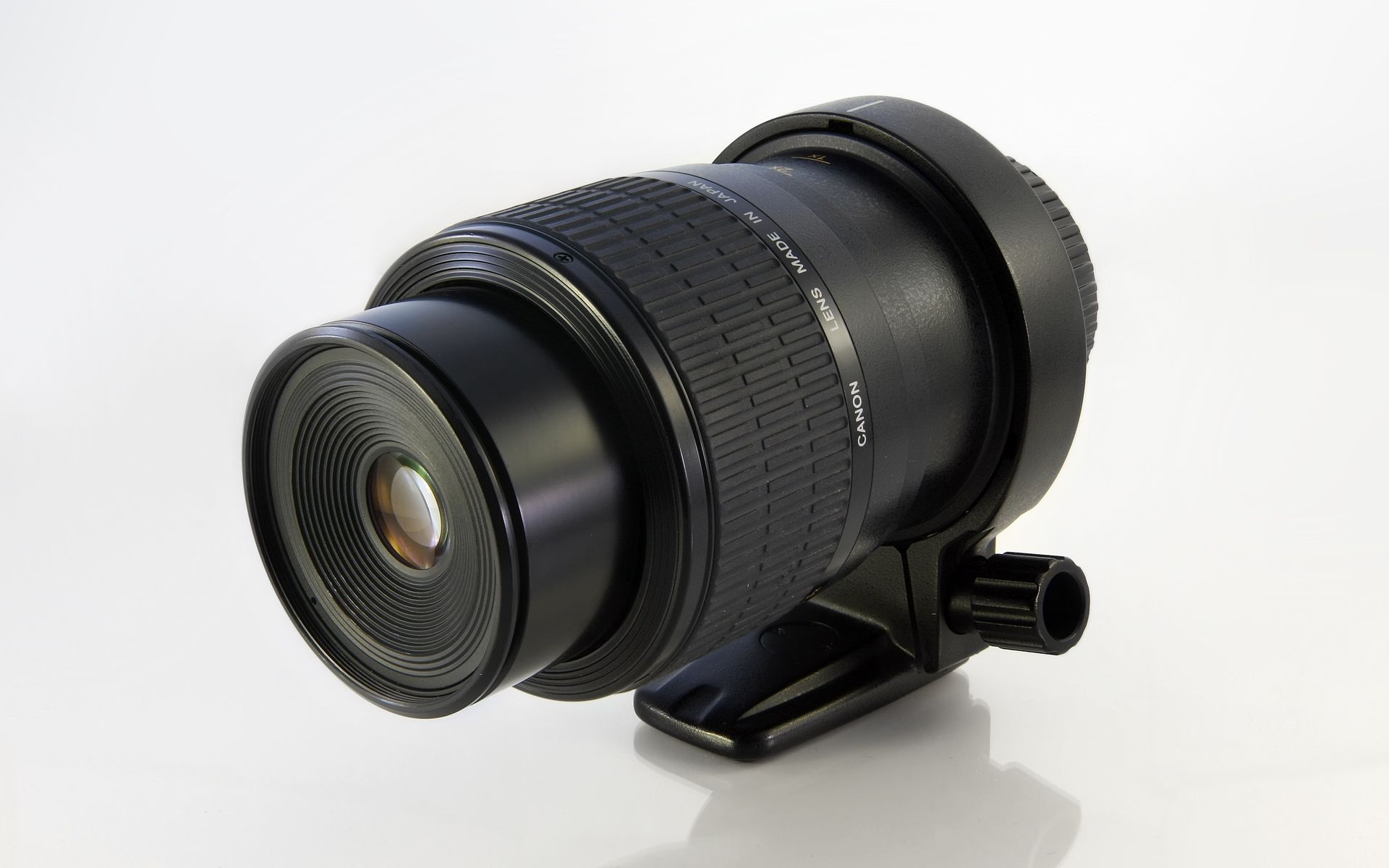
- The lens at 2x magnification, mounted on its tripod collar.
- Maker: Canon

Technical data
- Type: Prime
- Focal length: 65 mm
- Crop factor: 1.0
- Aperture (max/min): f/2.8–f/16
- Close focus distance: 240 mm (9.4 in)
- Max. focus distance: 313 mm (12.3 in)
- Max. magnification: 5:1
- Diaphragm blades: 6
- Construction: 10 elements in 8 groups

Features
- Short back focus: No No
- Ultrasonic motor: No No
- Lens-based stabilization: No No
- Macro capable: Yes Yes
- Unique features: 5:1 macro
- Application: Macro, magnification

Physical
- Max. length: 98 mm (3.9 in)
- Diameter: 81 mm (3.2 in)
- Weight: 710 g (25 oz)
- Filter diameter: 58 mm

Accessories
- Lens hood: 0028T225
- Case: LP1216

Angle of view
- Horizontal: 15°40'
- Vertical: 10°35'
- Diagonal: 18°40'

Retail info
- MSRP: $1400 (Street: $900) USD

The MP-E65mm f/2.8 1-5x Macro Photo is a photographic lens that was released in September 1999 and was discontinued in 2023. It was manufactured by Canon for use on the EOS photographic system. It is a manual focus lens for the EF mount and is specifically designed for macro photography. Unlike other macro lenses, such as the EF50mm f/2.5 Compact Macro and the EF-S60mm f/2.8 Macro USM, it does not focus to infinity and cannot be used for conventional photography.

This lens is capable of generating full-frame images up to five times the size of the subject natively. It is capable of generating full-frame images up to ten times the size of the subject with the addition of a 2‌× Extender teleconverter. Minor additional magnification can also be achieved by the addition of a Canon or third-party extension tube. It exhibits an extremely low depth of field, a maximum of 2.24mm at f/16 at 1× magnification, and a minimum of 0.048 mm at f/2.8 at 5× magnification. It is sensitive to faint vibrations, with slight breezes or imperceptible movements having potentially significant effects on image focus. A tripod is generally required when using this lens, but handheld photography with this lens can produce images with good focus when a flash is used.

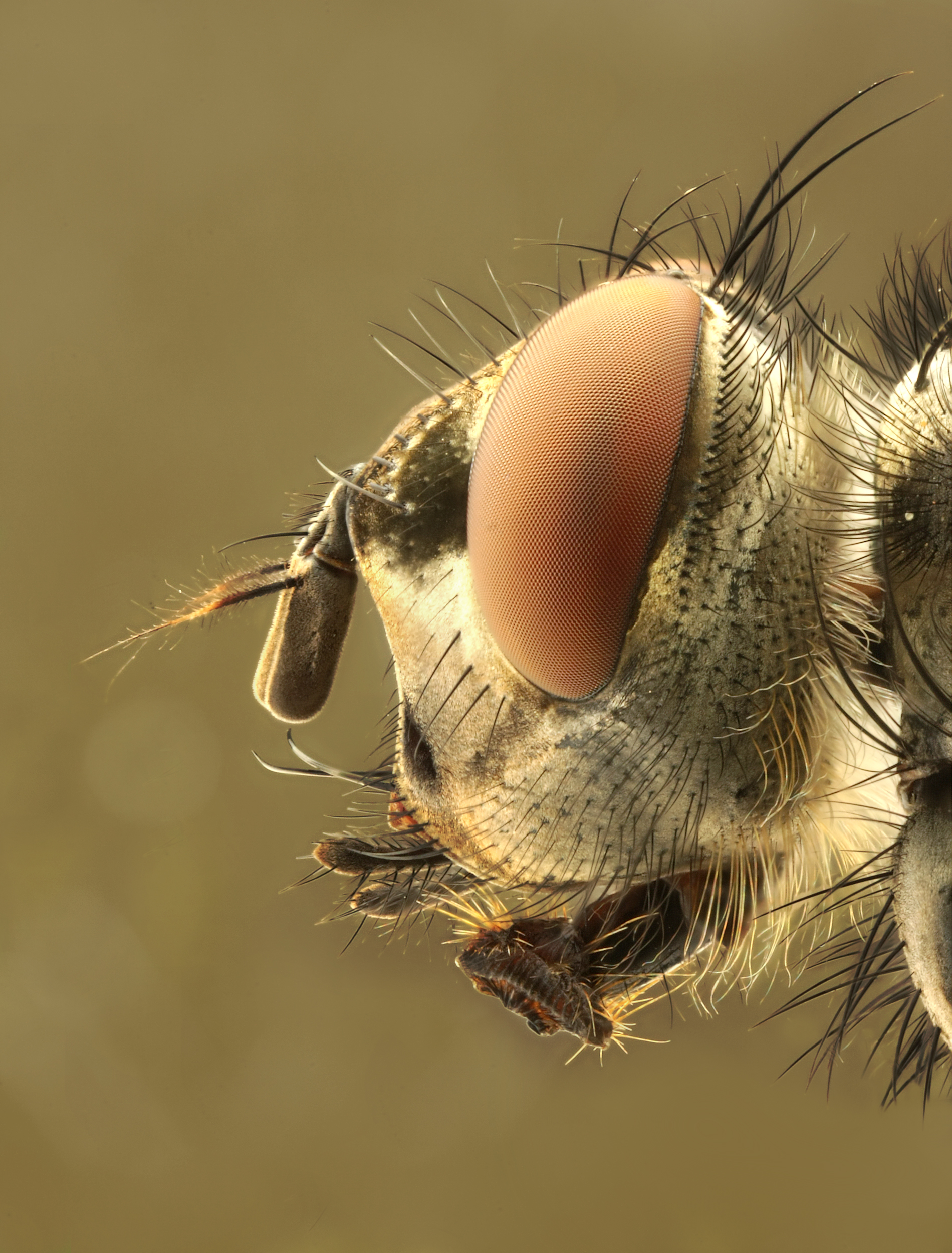
Head of a fly (Calliphoridae), photographed using the MP-E 65mm lens (focus stacked).

The technical specifications indicate an aperture range of f/2.8 to f/16, which is the value displayed by the camera body when the focus is set to infinity. However, the MP-E 65mm lens cannot be set to infinity, so its effective f-number depends on the magnification ratio chosen, and is calculated as:

Effective f-number = f-number × (magnification + 1)

For example, at 3× magnification with a listed aperture of f/8, the effective f-number is 8 × (3+1) = f/32. Hence, the lens may have an effective f-number of f/5.6 at 1× magnification to f/96 at 5× magnification. When a Canon Extender EF is attached, the usual f-number compensation is applied (in the previous example of f/5.6 at 5× magnification, the effective f-number would be f/180 if the Canon Extender 2× was attached to the lens.) Magnification is continuous, not discrete, so fractional magnification values (for example, 2.3×) are possible. The lens circuitry communicates the chosen magnification ratio to the camera body, so it will be recorded in the image metadata. It can be viewed by Exiftool version 8.11 or later.

Canon recommends using either aperture priority or manual mode when using this lens.
