= Canon EOS 1200D =

2014 APS-C digital single-lens reflex camera

Canon EOS 1200D Canon EOS Rebel T5 Canon EOS Kiss X70
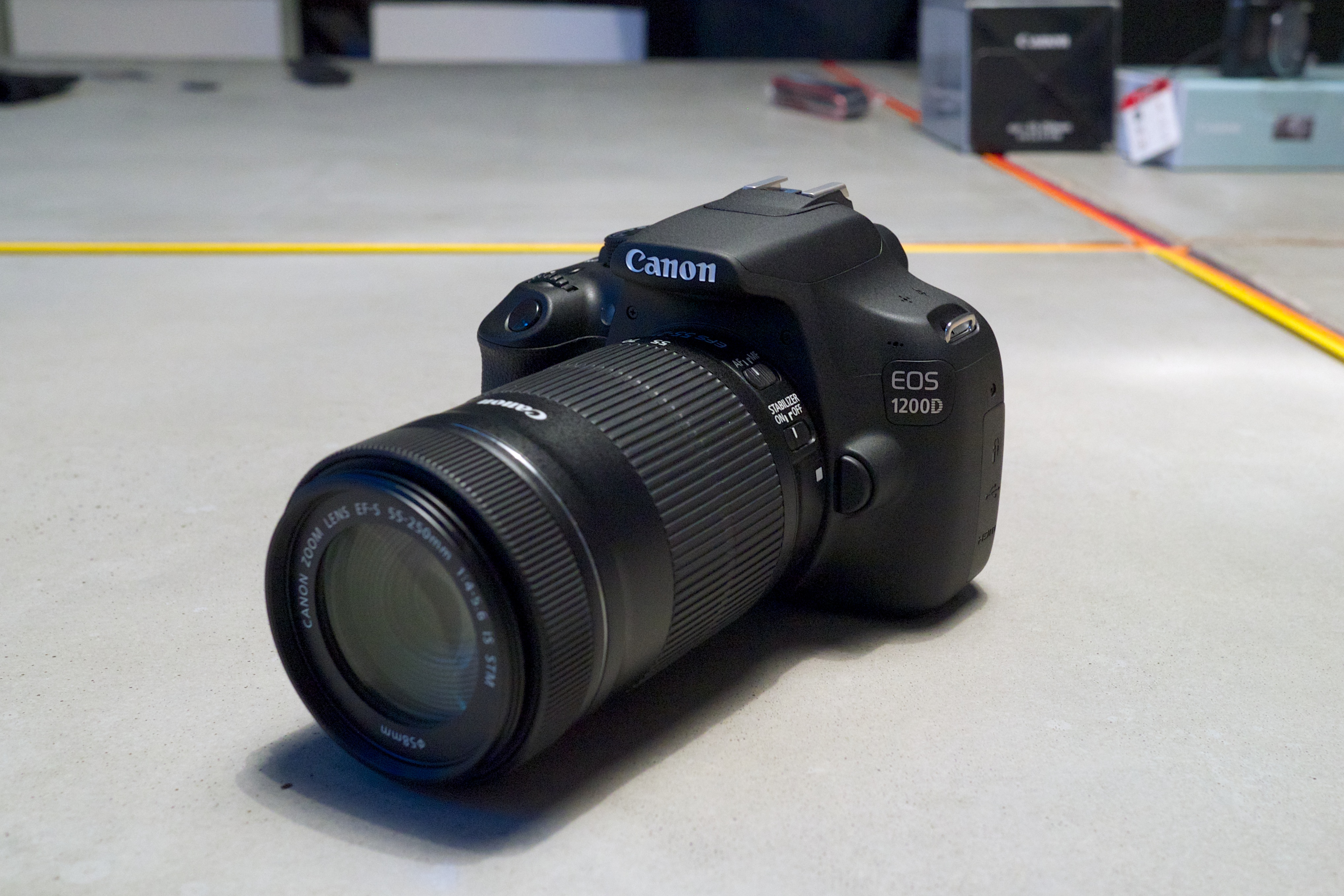
- 1200D with a 55–250mm lens

Overview
- Maker: Canon Inc.
- Type: Digital single-lens reflex camera

Lens
- Lens mount: Canon EF-S
- Lens: Canon EF-S lens mount, Canon EF-S lens mount

Sensor/medium
- Sensor: CMOS APS-C 22.3 mm × 14.9 mm (1.6× conversion factor)
- Maximum resolution: 18.1 effective megapixels, 5,184 × 3,456
- Film speed: ISO 100 to 6400
- Storage media: Secure Digital Card; Secure Digital High Capacity; Secure Digital Extended Capacity

Focusing
- Focus modes: AI Focus, One-Shot, AI Servo
- Focus areas: 9 AF points

Exposure/metering
- Exposure modes: Full Auto, Portrait, Landscape, Close-up, Sports, Night Portrait, No Flash, Program AE, Shutter-priority, Aperture-priority, Manual, Auto Depth-of-field, Creative Auto
- Exposure metering: Full aperture TTL, 63 zone iFCL SPC
- Metering modes: Evaluative, Partial (approx. 10% at center of viewfinder), Center-weighted average

Flash
- Flash: E-TTL II automatic built-in pop-up, 13 m ISO 100 guide number, 27 mm (equivalent in 35 format) lens focal length coverage; compatible with Canon EX Series Speedlite external hotshoe-mount flashes
- Flash bracketing: Yes

Shutter
- Shutter: focal-plane
- Shutter speed range: 1/4000 s to 30 s and Bulb
- Continuous shooting: 3 fps for 69 JPEG frames or for 6 RAW frames

Viewfinder
- Viewfinder: Eye-level pentamirror SLR, 95% coverage, 0.80x magnification

Image processing
- Image processor: DIGIC 4
- White balance: Auto, Daylight, Shade, Cloudy, Tungsten Light, White Fluorescent Light, Flash, Manual, user-set
- WB bracketing: ± 3 stops in 1-stop increments;

General
- LCD screen: 3.0 in (7.6 cm) color TFT LCD, 460.000 pixels
- Battery: LP-E10 Battery Pack
- Dimensions: 130 mm × 100 mm × 78 mm (5.11 in × 3.93 in × 3.07 in)
- Weight: 480 g (17 oz) CIPA
- Made in: Taiwan

Chronology
- Predecessor: Canon EOS 1100D
- Successor: Canon EOS 1300D

Canon EOS 1200D is an 18.1 megapixel digital single-lens reflex camera (DSLR) announced by Canon on 11 February 2014. It is known as the EOS Kiss X70 in Japan, the EOS Rebel T5 in the Americas, and the EOS Hi in Korea. The 1200D is an entry-level DSLR that introduces an 18 MP sensor from the 700D and 1080p HD video to Canon's entry level DSLRs. It replaces the 1100D.

Canon announced in March 2016 that the 1200D was replaced by the 1300D.

== Features ==
- 18.0 Megapixel CMOS (APS-C) image sensor
- Canon's DIGIC 4 Image Processor
- 9-point AF points
- ISO 100 – 6400 (Expandable to H: 12800)
- Up to 3.0 fps Continuous Shooting
- Canon EF-S lens mount
- 3.0 in (7.6 cm) LCD monitor
- sRGB and Adobe RGB color spaces
- RAW, JPEG file formats
- Full HD video recording
- Compatible with GPS receiver GP-E2
- Canon RS-60E3 pin type for intervalometer.

Type	Sensor	Class	00	01	02	03	04	05	06	07	08	09	10	11	12	13	14	15	16	17	18	19	20	21	22	23	24	25	26
DSLR	Full-frame	Flagship				1Ds		1Ds Mk II			1Ds Mk III					1D C													
DSLR	Full-frame	Flagship				1Ds		1Ds Mk II			1Ds Mk III				1D X					1D X Mk II ^{T}			1D X Mk III ^{T}						
DSLR	APS-H	Flagship			1D			1D Mk II	1D Mk II N		1D Mk III		1D Mk IV																
DSLR	Full-frame	Professional																	5DS / 5DS R										
DSLR	Full-frame	Professional							5D			_{x} 5D Mk II			_{x} 5D Mk III					5D Mk IV ^{T}									
DSLR	Full-frame	Advanced														_{x} 6D					_{x} 6D Mk II ^{AT}								
DSLR	APS-C	Advanced											_{x} 7D					_{x} 7D Mk II											
DSLR	APS-C	Mid-range						20Da								_{x} 60Da ^{A}													
DSLR	APS-C	Mid-range		D30	D60	10D		20D	30D		40D	_{x} 50D		_{x} 60D ^{A}			_{x} 70D ^{AT}		80D ^{AT}				90D ^{AT}						
DSLR	APS-C	Mid-range																	760D ^{AT}		77D ^{AT}								
DSLR	APS-C	Entry-level					300D	350D		400D	450D	_{x} 500D	_{x} 550D	_{x} 600D ^{A}		_{x} 650D ^{AT}	_{x} 700D ^{AT}		_{x} 750D ^{AT}		800D ^{AT}			850D ^{AT}					
DSLR	APS-C	Entry-level															_{x} 100D ^{T}		_{x} 200D ^{AT}				250D ^{AT}						
DSLR	APS-C	Entry-level										1000D		_{x} 1100D			_{x} 1200D			1300D		2000D							
DSLR	APS-C	Value																				4000D							
Early models			Canon EOS DCS 5 (1995); Canon EOS DCS 3 (1995); Canon EOS DCS 1 (1995); Canon EOS D2000 (1998); Canon EOS D6000 (1998)																										
Type	Sensor	Spec																											
Type	Sensor	Spec	00	01	02	03	04	05	06	07	08	09	10	11	12	13	14	15	16	17	18	19	20	21	22	23	24	25	26
