= Canon EOS 4000D =

2018 APS-C digital single-lens reflex camera

Canon EOS 4000D EOS Rebel T100 EOS 3000D
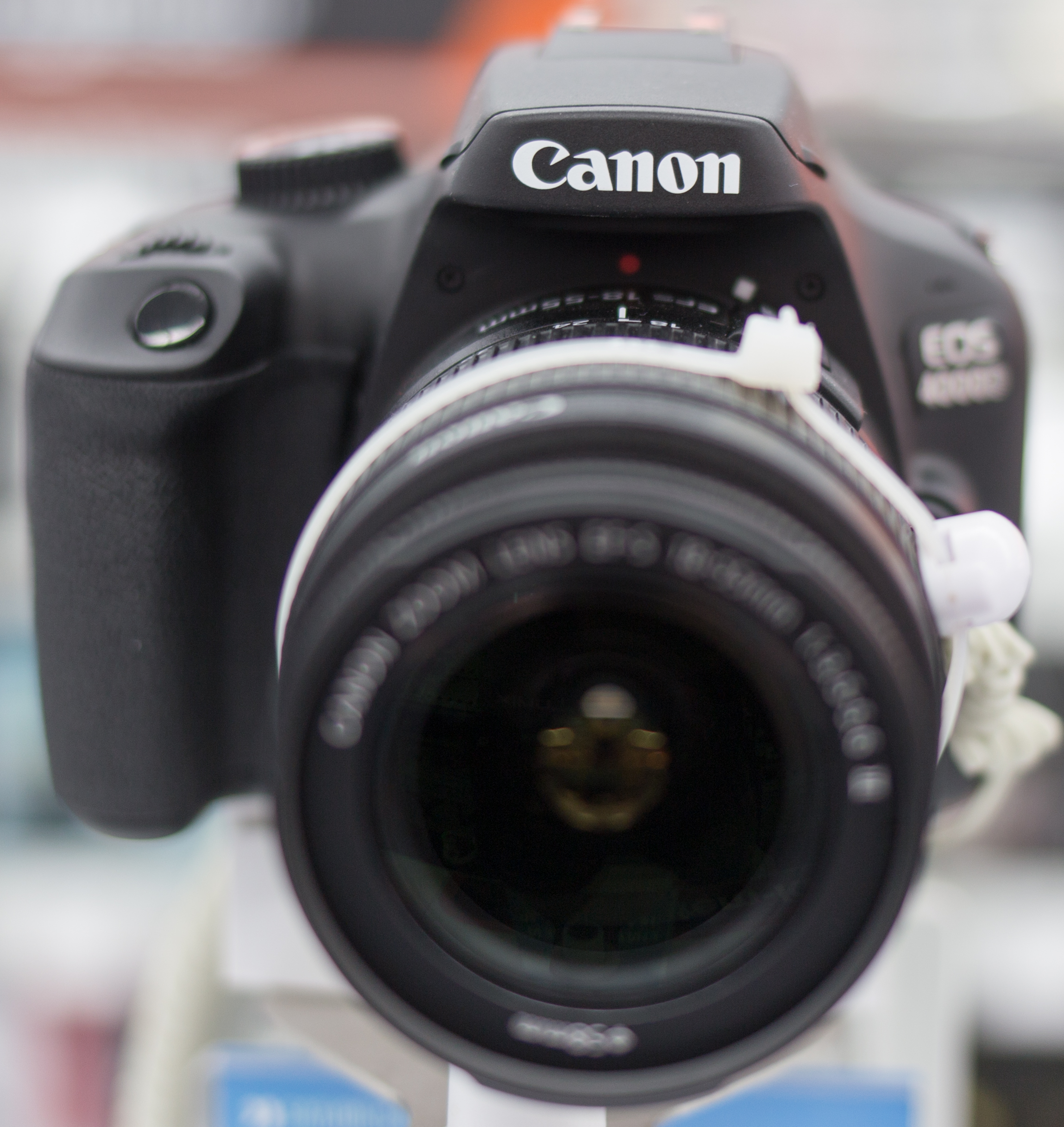
- Canon EOS 4000D

Overview
- Maker: Canon Inc.
- Type: Digital single-lens reflex camera

Lens
- Lens mount: Canon EF
- Lens: Interchangeable (EF / EF-S)

Sensor/medium
- Sensor type: CMOS
- Sensor size: 22.3 × 14.9 mm (APS-C format with 1.6x conversion factor)
- Maximum resolution: 5184 × 3456 (18.0 effective megapixels)
- Film speed: 100 – 6400 (expandable to H: 12800)
- Storage media: SD/SDHC/SDXC card (Does not exploit UHS-I bus)

Focusing
- Focus modes: One-Shot, AI Focus, AI Servo, Live View (FlexiZone - Single, Face detection, AF Quick)
- Focus areas: 9 AF points

Exposure/metering
- Exposure modes: Scene Intelligent Auto, Flash Off, Creative Auto, Portrait, Landscape, Close-up, Sports, Foods, Night Portrait, Program AE, Shutter priority AE, Aperture priority AE, Manual exposure, Movie
- Exposure metering: Full aperture TTL, 63 zones

Flash
- Flash: E-TTL II auto-pop-up built-in / External
- Flash bracketing: Yes

Shutter
- Shutter: Electronic focal-plane
- Shutter speed range: 1/4000 sec. – 30 sec. and Bulb; X-sync at 1/200 sec.
- Continuous shooting: 3.0 fps for unlimited JPEG frames or for 6 RAW frames

Viewfinder
- Viewfinder: Eye-level pentamirror with 95% coverage and 0.80× magnification / LCD (Live View)

Image processing
- Image processor: DIGIC 4+
- White balance: Auto, Daylight, Shade, Cloudy, Tungsten, White Fluorescent, Flash, Custom
- WB bracketing: -/+ 3 stops in 1-stop increments

General
- LCD screen: 2.7" (7.0 cm) 4:3 aspect ratio colour TFT LCD screen with 320 × 240 pixels
- Battery: Li-Ion LP-E10 rechargeable (860 mAh)
- Dimensions: 129 mm × 101.6 mm × 77.1 mm (5.08 in × 4.00 in × 3.04 in)
- Weight: 436 g (15.4 oz) CIPA
- Made in: Taiwan

Chronology
- Predecessor: Canon EOS 1300D

The Canon EOS 4000D is an 18.0 megapixels digital single-lens reflex camera (DSLR) made by Canon. It was announced on 25 February 2018 with a suggested retail price of €399 including an EF-S 18-55 f/3.5-5.6 III lens. It is also known as the EOS 3000D in some parts of the Asia Pacific region and the EOS Rebel T100 in North America.

The 4000D is an entry-level DSLR that has been optimized to sell at a low retail price. It replaces the EOS 1300D in the respect that it is the Canon DSLR with the lowest recommended retail price.

== Features ==
- 18.0 effective megapixel APS-C CMOS sensor
- 9 AF points with 1 cross-type point in the center at f/5.6, extra sensitivity at f/2.8 or faster (except when an EF 28-80mm f/2.8-4L USM lens or EF50mm f/2.5 Compact Macro lens is attached)
- ISO sensitivity 100 – 6400 (expandable to H: 12800)
- 95% viewfinder frame coverage with 0.8× magnification
- 1080p Full HD video recording at 24p, 25p (25 Hz) and 30p (29.97 Hz) with drop frame timing
- 720p HD video recording at 60p (59.94 Hz) and 50p (50 Hz)
- 3.0 frames per second continuous shooting
- 2.7 inch (68.6 mm) 4:3 ratio colour TFT LCD screen
- Low-pass filter

Differences compared to the 1300D:

- Lower resolution of the screen: 2.7″ screen with 320 × 240 pixels (the resolution of the 1300D's display is about four times as high with 640 × 480 pixels at 3.0″)
- Wi-Fi connectivity is available but NFC connectivity is not included
- Plastic lens mount (all other Canon DSLR cameras have a metal lens mount)

Type	Sensor	Class	00	01	02	03	04	05	06	07	08	09	10	11	12	13	14	15	16	17	18	19	20	21	22	23	24	25
DSLR	Full-frame	Flagship				1Ds		1Ds Mk II			1Ds Mk III					1D C												
DSLR	Full-frame	Flagship				1Ds		1Ds Mk II			1Ds Mk III				1D X					1D X Mk II ^{T}			1D X Mk III ^{T}					
DSLR	APS-H	Flagship			1D			1D Mk II	1D Mk II N		1D Mk III		1D Mk IV															
DSLR	Full-frame	Professional																	5DS / 5DS R									
DSLR	Full-frame	Professional							5D			_{x} 5D Mk II			_{x} 5D Mk III					5D Mk IV ^{T}								
DSLR	Full-frame	Advanced														_{x} 6D					_{x} 6D Mk II ^{AT}							
DSLR	APS-C	Advanced											_{x} 7D					_{x} 7D Mk II										
DSLR	APS-C	Mid-range						20Da								_{x} 60Da ^{A}												
DSLR	APS-C	Mid-range		D30	D60	10D		20D	30D		40D	_{x} 50D		_{x} 60D ^{A}		_{x} 70D ^{AT}		80D ^{AT}					90D ^{AT}					
DSLR	APS-C	Mid-range																	760D ^{AT}		77D ^{AT}							
DSLR	APS-C	Entry-level					300D	350D		400D	450D	_{x} 500D	_{x} 550D	_{x} 600D ^{A}		_{x} 650D ^{AT}	_{x} 700D ^{AT}		_{x} 750D ^{AT}		800D ^{AT}			850D ^{AT}				
DSLR	APS-C	Entry-level															_{x} 100D ^{T}		_{x} 200D ^{AT}				250D ^{AT}					
DSLR	APS-C	Entry-level										1000D		_{x} 1100D			_{x} 1200D			1300D		2000D						
DSLR	APS-C	Value																				4000D						
Early models			Canon EOS DCS 5 (1995); Canon EOS DCS 3 (1995); Canon EOS DCS 1 (1995); Canon EOS D2000 (1998); Canon EOS D6000 (1998)																									
Type	Sensor	Spec																										
Type	Sensor	Spec	00	01	02	03	04	05	06	07	08	09	10	11	12	13	14	15	16	17	18	19	20	21	22	23	24	25
