= Canon EOS 2000D =

2018 APS-C digital single-lens reflex cameral

Canon EOS 2000D; Canon EOS Rebel T7; Canon EOS Kiss X90; Canon EOS 1500D
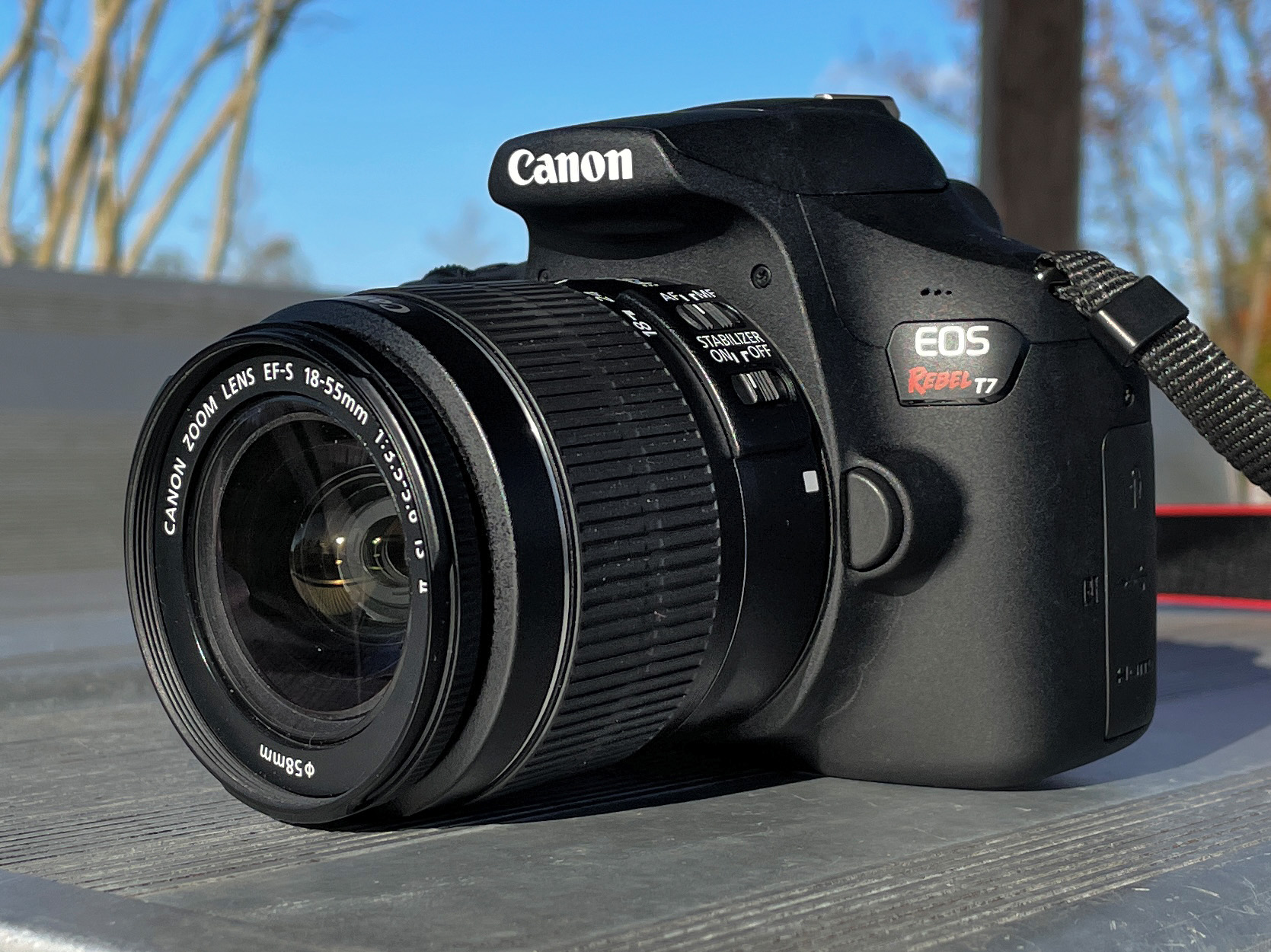

Overview
- Maker: Canon Inc.
- Type: Digital single-lens reflex camera

Lens
- Lens mount: Canon EF
- Lens: Interchangeable (EF / EF-S)

Sensor/medium
- Sensor type: CMOS
- Sensor size: 22.3 × 14.9 mm (APS-C format)
- Maximum resolution: 24.1 megapixels
- Film speed: 100 – 6400 (expandable to H: 12800)
- Storage media: SD/SDHC/SDXC card (Does not exploit UHS-I bus)

Focusing
- Focus modes: One-Shot, AI Focus, AI Servo, Live View (FlexiZone - Single, Face detection, AF Quick)
- Focus areas: 9 AF points

Exposure/metering
- Exposure modes: Scene Intelligent Auto, Flash Off, Creative Auto, Portrait, Landscape, Close-up, Sports, Foods, Night Portrait, Program AE, Shutter priority AE, Aperture priority AE, Manual exposure, Movie
- Exposure metering: Full aperture TTL, 63 zones

Flash
- Flash: E-TTL II auto-pop-up built-in / External
- Flash bracketing: Yes

Shutter
- Shutter: Electronic focal-plane
- Shutter speed range: 1/4000 sec. – 30 sec. and Bulb; X-sync at 1/200 sec.
- Continuous shooting: 3.0 fps for 150 JPEG frames or for 11 RAW frames

Viewfinder
- Viewfinder: Eye-level pentamirror with 95% coverage and 0.80× magnification / LCD (Live View)

Image processing
- Image processor: DIGIC 4+
- White balance: Auto, Daylight, Shade, Cloudy, Tungsten, White Fluorescent, Flash, Custom
- WB bracketing: -/+ 3 stops in 1-stop increments

General
- LCD screen: 3.0" (7.5 cm) 4:3 aspect ratio colour TFT LCD screen with 920.000 dots
- Battery: Li-Ion LP-E10 rechargeable (860 mAh)
- Dimensions: 129 mm × 101.3 mm × 77.6 mm (5.08 in × 3.99 in × 3.06 in)
- Weight: 475 g (16.8 oz) CIPA
- Latest firmware: 1.2.1 / 2 February 2024; 2 years ago
- Made in: Taiwan

Chronology
- Predecessor: Canon EOS 1300D
- Successor: Canon EOS R100 (mirrorless)

The Canon EOS 2000D, known as the Rebel T7 in the Americas, as the Kiss X90 in Japan and as the 1500D in southeast Asia, is a 24.1 megapixels digital single-lens reflex camera (DSLR) made by Canon. It was announced on February 25, 2018 with a suggested retail price of US$549.99 including the EF-S 18-55 f/3.5-5.6 IS II lens.

The 2000D is an entry-level DSLR that supersedes the EOS 1300D. A key feature was the introduction of the new 24.0 megapixels sensor.

== Features ==
- 24.1 effective megapixel APS-C CMOS sensor
- 9 AF points with 1 cross-type point in the center at f/5.6, extra sensitivity at f/2.8 or faster (except when an EF 28-80mm f/2.8-4L USM lens or EF 50mm f/2.5 Compact Macro lens is attached)
- ISO sensitivity 100 – 6400 (expandable to H: 12800)
- 1080p Full HD video recording at 24p, 25p (25 Hz) and 30p (29.97 Hz) with drop frame timing
- 720p HD video recording at 60 fps (59.94 Hz) and 50 fps (50 Hz)
- 3.0" in 4:3 ratio colour TFT LCD screen

Differences compared to the 1300D:

- 24.0 megapixels sensor

Type	Sensor	Class	00	01	02	03	04	05	06	07	08	09	10	11	12	13	14	15	16	17	18	19	20	21	22	23	24	25	26
DSLR	Full-frame	Flagship				1Ds		1Ds Mk II			1Ds Mk III					1D C													
DSLR	Full-frame	Flagship				1Ds		1Ds Mk II			1Ds Mk III				1D X					1D X Mk II ^{T}			1D X Mk III ^{T}						
DSLR	APS-H	Flagship			1D			1D Mk II	1D Mk II N		1D Mk III		1D Mk IV																
DSLR	Full-frame	Professional																	5DS / 5DS R										
DSLR	Full-frame	Professional							5D			_{x} 5D Mk II			_{x} 5D Mk III					5D Mk IV ^{T}									
DSLR	Full-frame	Advanced														_{x} 6D					_{x} 6D Mk II ^{AT}								
DSLR	APS-C	Advanced											_{x} 7D					_{x} 7D Mk II											
DSLR	APS-C	Mid-range						20Da								_{x} 60Da ^{A}													
DSLR	APS-C	Mid-range		D30	D60	10D		20D	30D		40D	_{x} 50D		_{x} 60D ^{A}			_{x} 70D ^{AT}		80D ^{AT}				90D ^{AT}						
DSLR	APS-C	Mid-range																	760D ^{AT}		77D ^{AT}								
DSLR	APS-C	Entry-level					300D	350D		400D	450D	_{x} 500D	_{x} 550D	_{x} 600D ^{A}		_{x} 650D ^{AT}	_{x} 700D ^{AT}		_{x} 750D ^{AT}		800D ^{AT}			850D ^{AT}					
DSLR	APS-C	Entry-level															_{x} 100D ^{T}		_{x} 200D ^{AT}				250D ^{AT}						
DSLR	APS-C	Entry-level										1000D		_{x} 1100D			_{x} 1200D			1300D		2000D							
DSLR	APS-C	Value																				4000D							
Early models			Canon EOS DCS 5 (1995); Canon EOS DCS 3 (1995); Canon EOS DCS 1 (1995); Canon EOS D2000 (1998); Canon EOS D6000 (1998)																										
Type	Sensor	Spec																											
Type	Sensor	Spec	00	01	02	03	04	05	06	07	08	09	10	11	12	13	14	15	16	17	18	19	20	21	22	23	24	25	26
