= Tamron SP AF 90mm f/2.8 Di 1:1 Macro =

SP AF 90mm f/2.8 Di 1:1 Macro
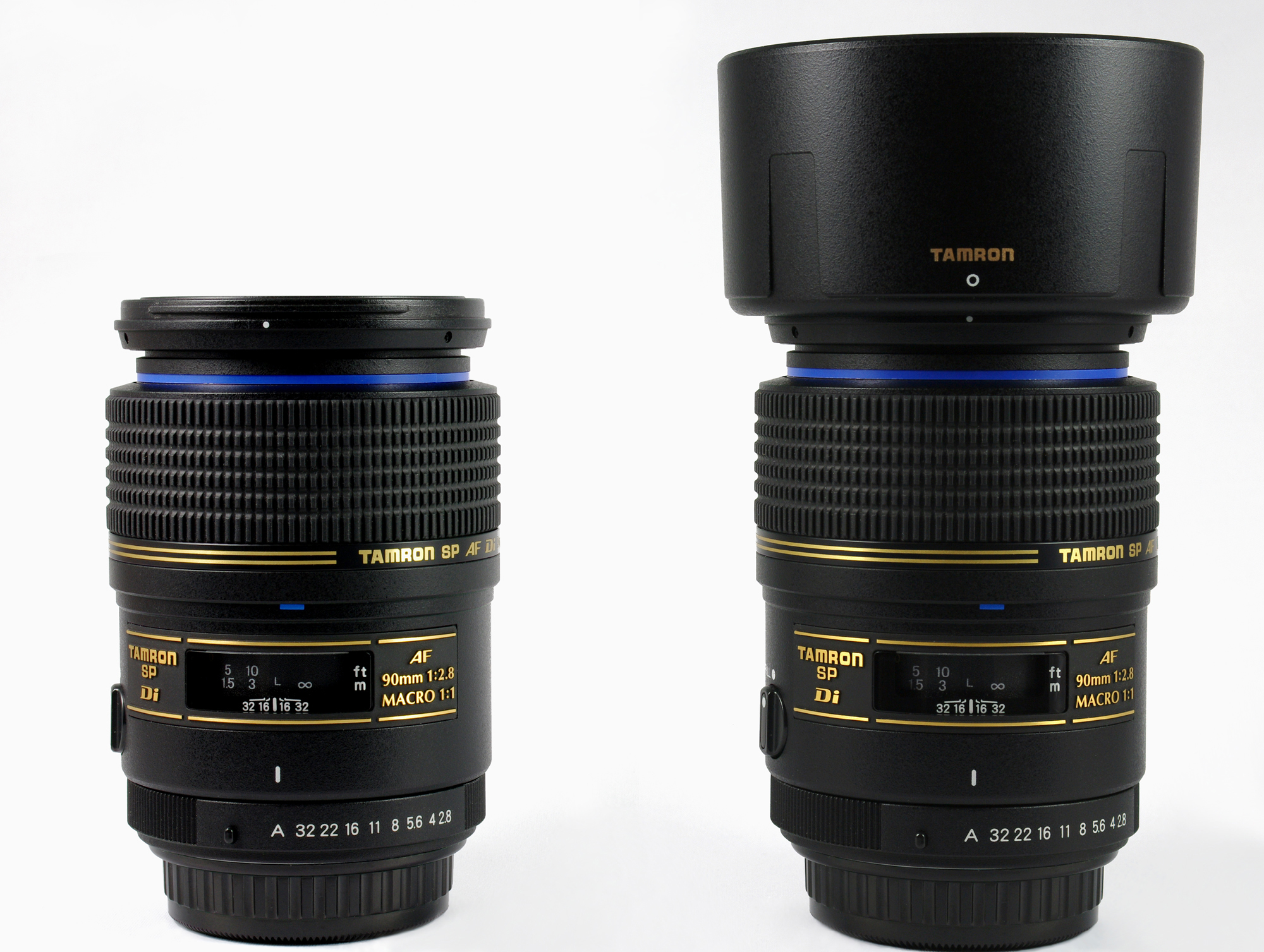
- Maker: Tamron

Technical data
- Focal length: 90mm
- Aperture (max/min): f/2.8 - f/32
- Close focus distance: 11.4 cm
- Max. magnification: 1:1
- Diaphragm blades: 9
- Construction: 10 elements in 9 groups

Features
- Short back focus: No No
- Ultrasonic motor: Yes Yes
- Lens-based stabilization: No No
- Macro capable: Yes Yes
- Application: Macro

Physical
- Max. length: 97 mm
- Weight: 405 g
- Filter diameter: 55 mm

Angle of view
- Horizontal: 27°

The SP AF 90mm f/2.8 Di 1:1 Macro lens is a macro lens produced by Tamron. It comes in the Canon EF-mount, Nikon F-mount, Pentax K-mount, and Sony A-mount. The lens was released in 1997. It received the European "Lens of the Year: 1997-1998" award. It was mechanically and cosmetically upgraded in February 2000. The lens is known for its high optical quality and reasonable price.
