= Canon EF-S 15–85mm lens =

Canon camera lens

EF-S 15–85mm f/3.5–5.6 IS USM
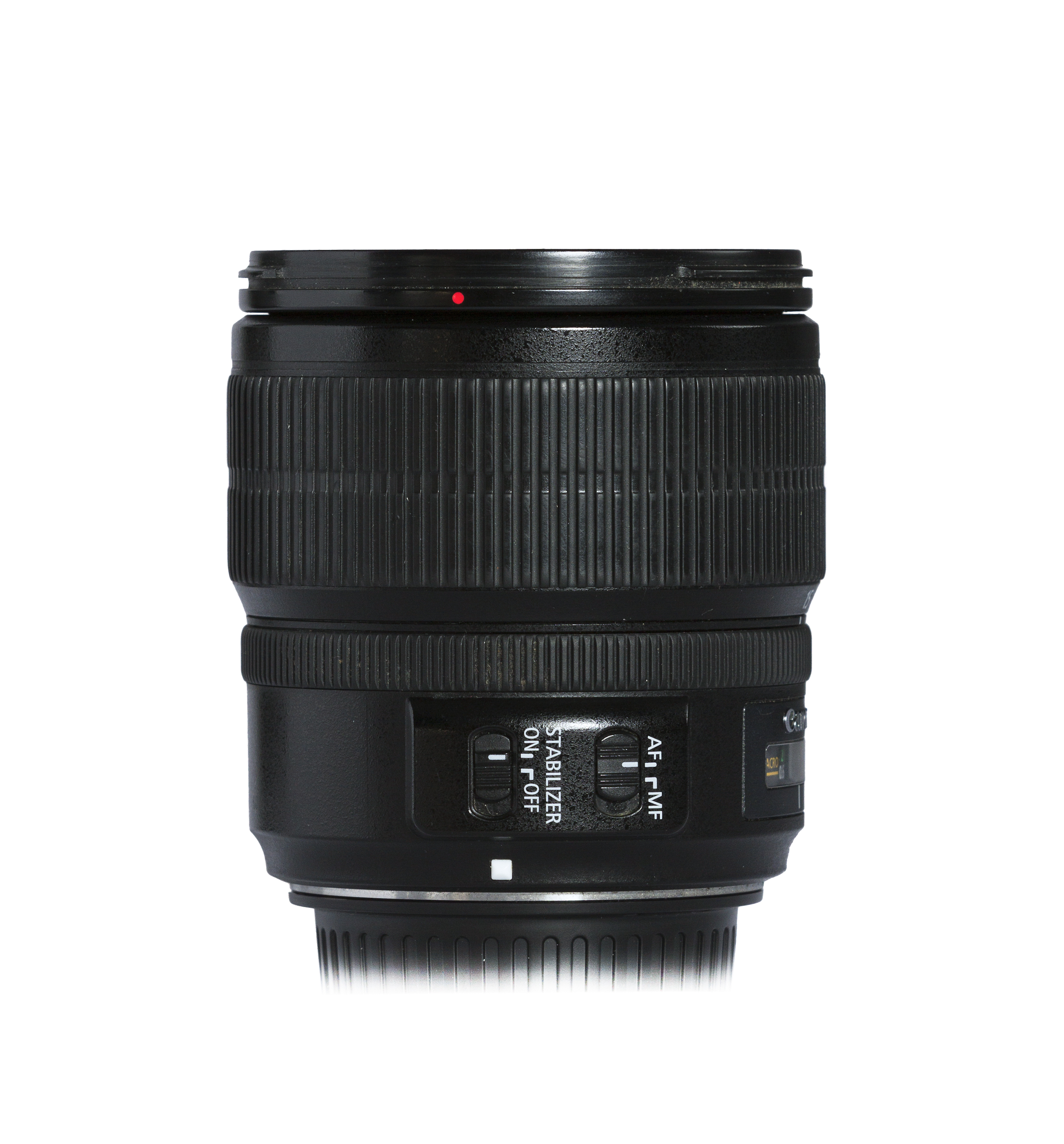
- Maker: Canon

Technical data
- Type: Zoom
- Focal length: 15–85mm
- Focal length (35mm equiv.): 24–136mm
- Crop factor: 1.6
- Aperture (max/min): f/3.5–5.6 / f/22–38
- Close focus distance: 0.35 m (1.15 ft)
- Max. magnification: 0.21 @ 85 mm
- Diaphragm blades: 7
- Construction: 17 elements in 12 groups

Features
- Short back focus: Yes Yes
- Ultrasonic motor: Yes Yes
- Lens-based stabilization: Yes Yes
- Macro capable: No No
- Application: Standard Zoom

Physical
- Max. length: 87.5 mm (3.4 in)
- Diameter: 81.6 mm (3.2 in)
- Weight: 575 g
- Filter diameter: 72 mm

Accessories
- Lens hood: EW-78E
- Case: LP1116 Soft Case

Angle of view
- Horizontal: 74°10'–15°25'
- Vertical: 53°30'–10°25'
- Diagonal: 84°30'–18°25'

History
- Introduction: 2009

Retail info
- MSRP: 799.99 USD

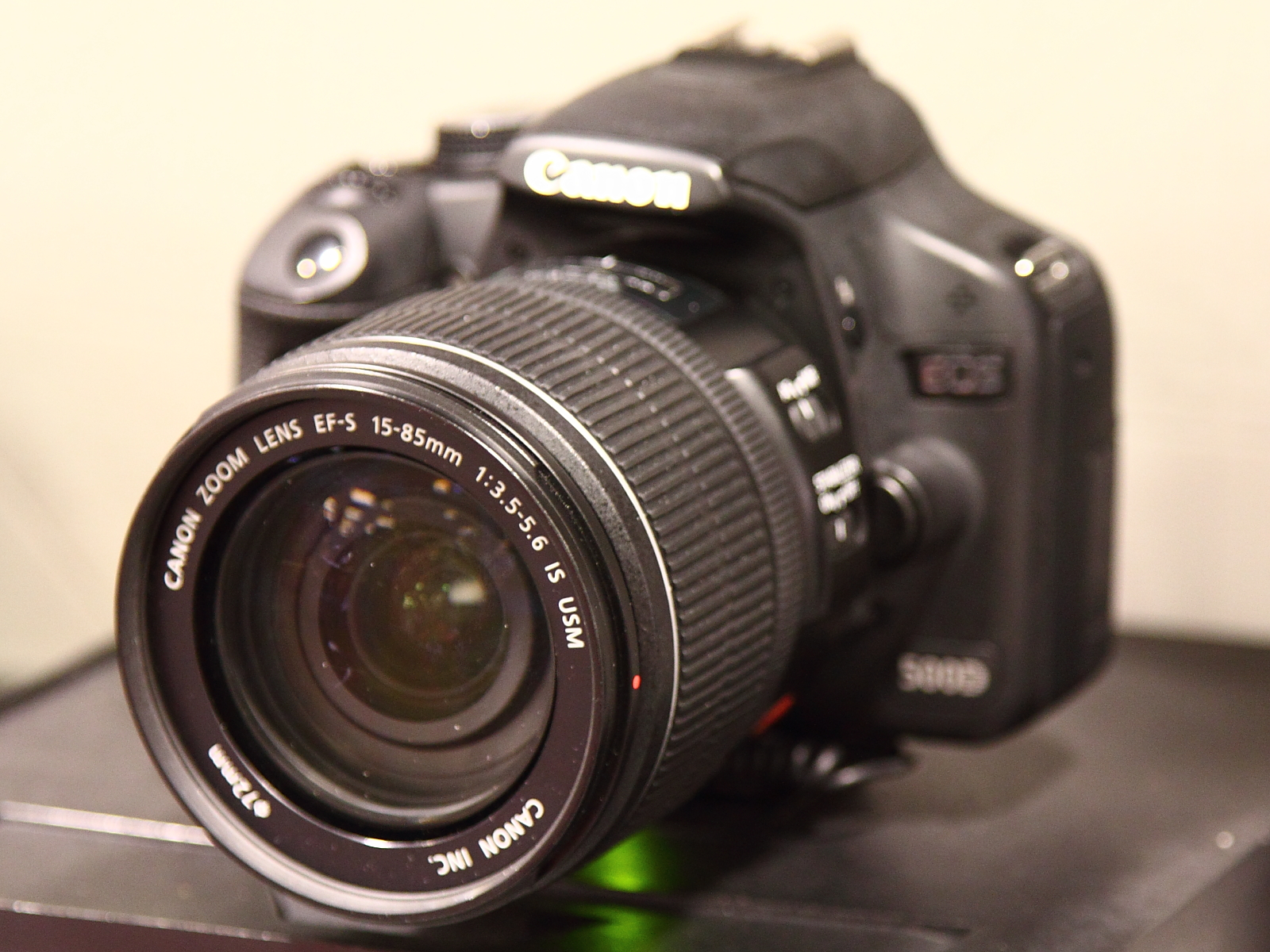
EF-S 15-85mm lens on Canon EOS 500D camera

The Canon EF-S 15–85mm f/3.5–5.6 IS USM is a standard zoom lens for Canon digital single-lens reflex cameras with an EF-S lens mount. The field of view has a 35 mm equivalent focal length of 24–136mm. The EF-S mount was specifically designed for APS-C cameras.

It is the higher end kit lens for the Canon EOS 7D.
