= Canon EOS 1000D =

2008 APS-C digital single-lens reflex camera

Canon EOS 1000D Canon EOS Rebel XS Canon EOS Kiss F
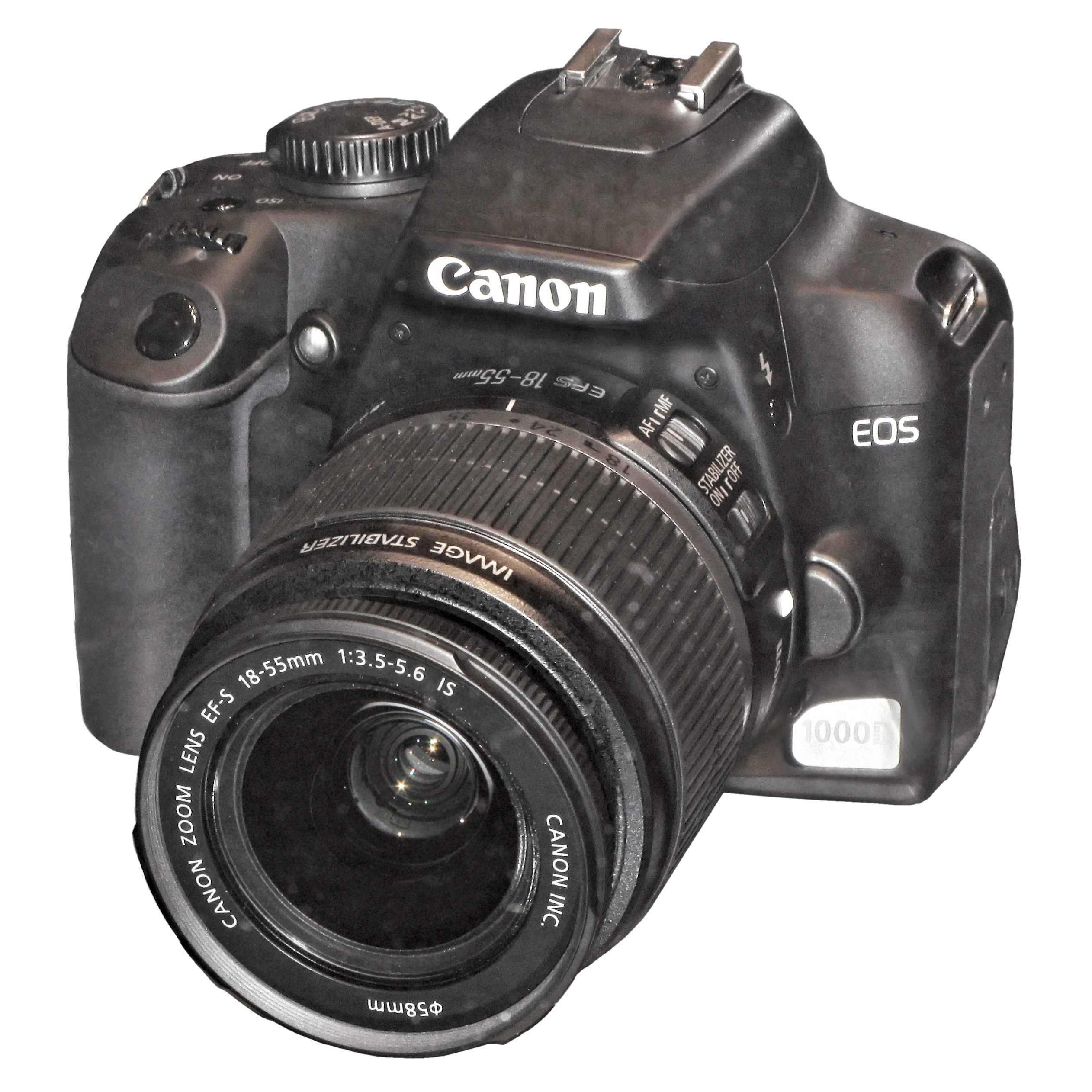

Overview
- Maker: Canon Inc.
- Type: Digital single-lens reflex

Lens
- Lens mount: Canon EF-S
- Lens: Interchangeable

Sensor/medium
- Sensor: CMOS APS-C 22.2 mm × 14.8 mm (1.6× conversion factor)
- Maximum resolution: 3,888 × 2,592 pixels (10.1 effective megapixels)
- Film speed: ISO 100–1,600
- Storage media: Secure Digital Card; Secure Digital High Capacity

Focusing
- Focus modes: AI Focus, One-Shot, Predictive AI Servo, Live Mode in Live View; Quick Mode in Live View
- Focus areas: 7 AF points

Exposure/metering
- Exposure modes: Full Auto, Portrait, Landscape, Close-up, Sports, Night Portrait, No Flash, Program AE, Shutter-priority, Aperture-priority, Manual, Auto Depth-of-field
- Exposure metering: Full aperture TTL, 35-zone SPC
- Metering modes: Evaluative, Partial (approx. 10% at center of viewfinder), Center-weighted average

Flash
- Flash: E-TTL II automatic built-in pop-up, 13m ISO 100 guide number, 27mm (equivalent in 35 format) lens focal length coverage; compatible with Canon EX Series Speedlite external hotshoe-mount flashes
- Flash synchronization: 1/200 s X-sync
- Flash bracketing: Yes

Shutter
- Shutter: Mechanical focal-plane
- Shutter speed range: 1/4000 to 30 s and Bulb
- Continuous shooting: 3 fps for 514 JPEG frames or 1.5 fps for 5 RAW frames

Viewfinder
- Viewfinder: Fixed eye-level pentamirror
- Viewfinder magnification: 0.81×
- Frame coverage: 95%

Image processing
- Image processor: DIGIC 3
- White balance: Auto, Daylight, Shade, Cloudy, Tungsten Light, White Fluorescent Light, Flash, Manual, user-set
- WB bracketing: ± 3 stops in 1-stop increments

General
- LCD screen: 2.5 in (6.4 cm) color TFT LCD, 230,000 pixels
- Battery: LP-E5 Battery Pack
- Optional battery packs: BG-E5
- Dimensions: 126.1 mm × 97.5 mm × 61.9 mm (4.96 in × 3.84 in × 2.44 in)
- Weight: 450 g (16 oz) (body only)
- Made in: Japan / Taiwan (body); Taiwan (kit lens)

Chronology
- Successor: Canon EOS 1100D

Canon EOS 1000D is a 10.1-megapixel digital single-lens reflex camera announced by Canon on 10 June 2008 and started shipping in mid August 2008. It is known as the EOS Kiss F in Japan and the EOS Rebel XS in the United States and Canada. The 1000D is an entry-level DSLR that has been described as being a step below the 450D.

The camera shares a few features with the 450D. It offers Live View shooting, DIGIC III Image Processor, and SDHC media storage. However, it has seven focus points (opposed to nine) and does not have spot light metering. The 1000D is also the second Canon EOS model (after the 450D) to exclusively use SD card and SDHC memory storage instead of CompactFlash.

== Features ==
- 10.1 effective megapixel APS-C CMOS sensor.
- Sensor Size : APS-C 22 mm ×14 mm
- Sensor Crop Factor: 1.6×
- DIGIC III Image Processor.
- 2.5 inches (6.4 cm) TFT color LCD monitor with 230,000-dot resolution.
- Wide-area 7-point AF with center cross-type sensors.
- EOS Self Cleaning Sensor Unit.
- Continuous Drive up to 3 frames per second for as many JPEG files or up to 1.5 frames per second for 5 RAW files or 4 RAW+JPEG files.
- ISO sensitivity 100–1600.
- Canon EF/EF-S lenses.
- NTSC/PAL video output.
- File formats include: JPEG, RAW (12-bit Canon original).
- Custom Functions (C.Fn) Such as Exposure Level Increment by f-stop etc.
- Canon LP-E5 battery pack, battery life (shots per charge) approx. 190–600 without flash or 180–500 with 50% flash use.
- Approx. weight 0.450 kilograms (0.99 lb).

== Reception ==
The 1000D has garnered positive reviews from independent photography review websites.

== Video recording and conferencing ==
Canon Live View with resolution 768x512 px can be recorded directly to a computer (not internal memory) with software:

- EOS-movrec (open source)
- Canon EOS Utility 2

Video conferencing can be done with the same resolution with EOS Webcam Utility 1.1 (not listed in the officially supported cameras, but it works)

Type	Sensor	Class	00	01	02	03	04	05	06	07	08	09	10	11	12	13	14	15	16	17	18	19	20	21	22	23	24	25	26
DSLR	Full-frame	Flagship				1Ds		1Ds Mk II			1Ds Mk III					1D C													
DSLR	Full-frame	Flagship				1Ds		1Ds Mk II			1Ds Mk III				1D X					1D X Mk II ^{T}			1D X Mk III ^{T}						
DSLR	APS-H	Flagship			1D			1D Mk II	1D Mk II N		1D Mk III		1D Mk IV																
DSLR	Full-frame	Professional																	5DS / 5DS R										
DSLR	Full-frame	Professional							5D			_{x} 5D Mk II			_{x} 5D Mk III					5D Mk IV ^{T}									
DSLR	Full-frame	Advanced														_{x} 6D					_{x} 6D Mk II ^{AT}								
DSLR	APS-C	Advanced											_{x} 7D					_{x} 7D Mk II											
DSLR	APS-C	Mid-range						20Da								_{x} 60Da ^{A}													
DSLR	APS-C	Mid-range		D30	D60	10D		20D	30D		40D	_{x} 50D		_{x} 60D ^{A}			_{x} 70D ^{AT}		80D ^{AT}				90D ^{AT}						
DSLR	APS-C	Mid-range																	760D ^{AT}		77D ^{AT}								
DSLR	APS-C	Entry-level					300D	350D		400D	450D	_{x} 500D	_{x} 550D	_{x} 600D ^{A}		_{x} 650D ^{AT}	_{x} 700D ^{AT}		_{x} 750D ^{AT}		800D ^{AT}			850D ^{AT}					
DSLR	APS-C	Entry-level															_{x} 100D ^{T}		_{x} 200D ^{AT}				250D ^{AT}						
DSLR	APS-C	Entry-level										1000D		_{x} 1100D			_{x} 1200D			1300D		2000D							
DSLR	APS-C	Value																				4000D							
Early models			Canon EOS DCS 5 (1995); Canon EOS DCS 3 (1995); Canon EOS DCS 1 (1995); Canon EOS D2000 (1998); Canon EOS D6000 (1998)																										
Type	Sensor	Spec																											
Type	Sensor	Spec	00	01	02	03	04	05	06	07	08	09	10	11	12	13	14	15	16	17	18	19	20	21	22	23	24	25	26
