= Canon EOS 1300D =

2016 APS-C digital single-lens reflex camera

Canon EOS 1300D Canon EOS Rebel T6 Canon EOS Kiss X80
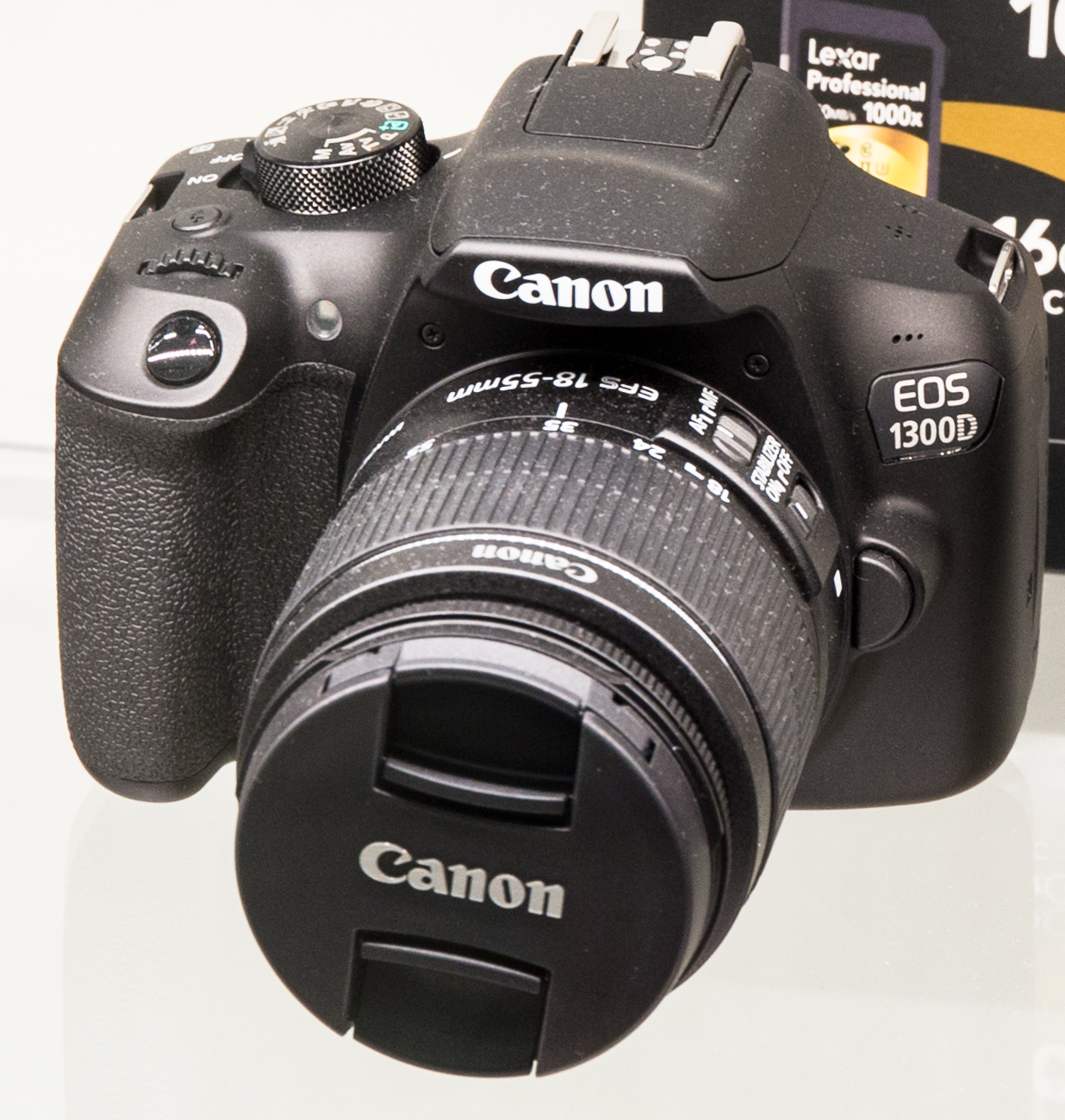

Overview
- Maker: Canon Inc.
- Type: Digital single-lens reflex camera

Lens
- Lens mount: Canon EF
- Lens: Interchangeable (EF / EF-S)

Sensor/medium
- Sensor type: CMOS
- Sensor size: 22.3 × 14.9 mm (APS-C format)
- Maximum resolution: 5184 × 3456 (18.0 effective megapixels)
- Film speed: 100 – 6400 (expandable to H: 12800)
- Storage media: SD/SDHC/SDXC card (Does not exploit UHS-I bus)

Focusing
- Focus modes: One-Shot, AI Focus, AI Servo, Live View (FlexiZone - Single, Face detection, AF Quick)
- Focus areas: 9 AF points

Exposure/metering
- Exposure modes: Scene Intelligent Auto, Flash Off, Creative Auto, Portrait, Landscape, Close-up, Sports, Foods, Night Portrait, Program AE, Shutter priority AE, Aperture priority AE, Manual exposure, Movie
- Exposure metering: Full aperture TTL, 63 zones

Flash
- Flash: E-TTL II auto-pop-up built-in / External
- Flash bracketing: Yes

Shutter
- Shutter: Electronic focal-plane
- Shutter speed range: 1/4000 sec. – 30 sec. and Bulb; X-sync at 1/200 sec.
- Continuous shooting: 3.0 fps for 69 JPEG frames or for 6 RAW frames

Viewfinder
- Viewfinder: Eye-level pentamirror with 95% coverage and 0.80× magnification / LCD (Live View)

Image processing
- Image processor: DIGIC 4+
- White balance: Auto, Daylight, Shade, Cloudy, Tungsten, White Fluorescent, Flash, Custom
- WB bracketing: -/+ 3 stops in 1-stop increments

General
- LCD screen: 3.0" (7.5 cm) 4:3 aspect ratio color TFT LCD screen with 920.000 dots
- Battery: Li-Ion LP-E10 rechargeable (860 mAh)
- Dimensions: 129 mm × 101 mm × 78 mm (5.1 in × 4.0 in × 3.1 in)
- Weight: 485 g (17.1 oz) CIPA
- Made in: Taiwan

Chronology
- Predecessor: Canon EOS 1200D
- Successor: Canon EOS 2000D

The Canon EOS 1300D, known as the Rebel T6 in the Americas or as the Kiss X80 in Japan, is an entry-level 18.0 megapixels digital single-lens reflex camera (DSLR) made by Canon. It was announced on March 10, 2016, with a suggested retail price of US$549.00.

The 1300D is an entry-level DSLR that supersedes the EOS 1200D. A key-added-feature was the introduction of Wi-Fi and near-field connectivity (NFC) for transfer of data to devices such as computers and smartphones.

== Features ==
- 18.0 effective megapixel APS-C CMOS sensor
- 9 AF points with 1 cross-type point in the center at f/5.6, extra sensitivity at f/2.8 or faster (except when an EF 28-80mm f/2.8-4L USM lens or EF 50mm f/2.5 Compact Macro lens is attached)
- ISO sensitivity 100 – 6400 (expandable to H: 12800)
- 95% viewfinder frame coverage with 0.80× magnification
- 1080p Full HD video recording at 24p, 25p (25 Hz) and 30p (29.97 Hz) with drop frame timing
- 720p HD video recording at 60p (59.94 Hz) and 50p (50 Hz)
- 480p ED video recording at 30p and 25p
- 3.0 frames per second continuous shooting
- 3.0" in 4:3 ratio color TFT LCD screen
- Low Pass Filter

Type	Sensor	Class	00	01	02	03	04	05	06	07	08	09	10	11	12	13	14	15	16	17	18	19	20	21	22	23	24	25
DSLR	Full-frame	Flagship				1Ds		1Ds Mk II			1Ds Mk III					1D C												
DSLR	Full-frame	Flagship				1Ds		1Ds Mk II			1Ds Mk III				1D X					1D X Mk II ^{T}			1D X Mk III ^{T}					
DSLR	APS-H	Flagship			1D			1D Mk II	1D Mk II N		1D Mk III		1D Mk IV															
DSLR	Full-frame	Professional																	5DS / 5DS R									
DSLR	Full-frame	Professional							5D			_{x} 5D Mk II			_{x} 5D Mk III					5D Mk IV ^{T}								
DSLR	Full-frame	Advanced														_{x} 6D					_{x} 6D Mk II ^{AT}							
DSLR	APS-C	Advanced											_{x} 7D					_{x} 7D Mk II										
DSLR	APS-C	Mid-range						20Da								_{x} 60Da ^{A}												
DSLR	APS-C	Mid-range		D30	D60	10D		20D	30D		40D	_{x} 50D		_{x} 60D ^{A}		_{x} 70D ^{AT}		80D ^{AT}					90D ^{AT}					
DSLR	APS-C	Mid-range																	760D ^{AT}		77D ^{AT}							
DSLR	APS-C	Entry-level					300D	350D		400D	450D	_{x} 500D	_{x} 550D	_{x} 600D ^{A}		_{x} 650D ^{AT}	_{x} 700D ^{AT}		_{x} 750D ^{AT}		800D ^{AT}			850D ^{AT}				
DSLR	APS-C	Entry-level															_{x} 100D ^{T}		_{x} 200D ^{AT}				250D ^{AT}					
DSLR	APS-C	Entry-level										1000D		_{x} 1100D			_{x} 1200D			1300D		2000D						
DSLR	APS-C	Value																				4000D						
Early models			Canon EOS DCS 5 (1995); Canon EOS DCS 3 (1995); Canon EOS DCS 1 (1995); Canon EOS D2000 (1998); Canon EOS D6000 (1998)																									
Type	Sensor	Spec																										
Type	Sensor	Spec	00	01	02	03	04	05	06	07	08	09	10	11	12	13	14	15	16	17	18	19	20	21	22	23	24	25
