= Canon EOS 1100D =

2011 APS-C digital single-lens reflex camera

Canon EOS 1100D Canon EOS Rebel T3 Canon EOS Kiss X50
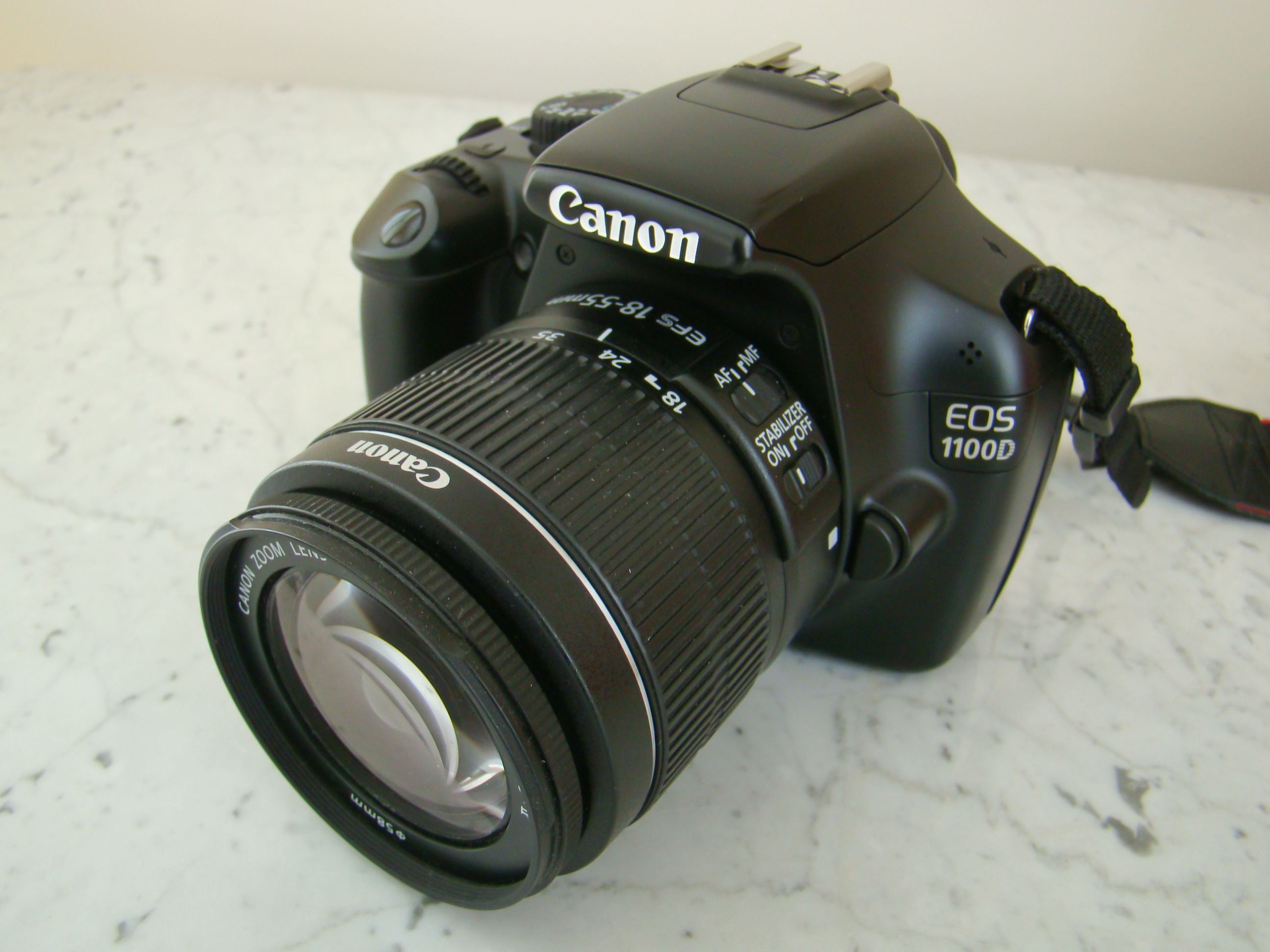

Overview
- Maker: Canon Inc.
- Type: Digital single-lens reflex camera

Lens
- Lens mount: Canon EF-S
- Lens: Canon EF lens mount, Canon EF-S lens mount

Sensor/medium
- Sensor: CMOS APS-C 22.2 × 14.7 mm (1.6x conversion factor)
- Maximum resolution: 12.2 effective megapixels, 4,272 × 2,848
- Film speed: ISO 100 to 6400
- Storage media: Secure Digital Card; Secure Digital High Capacity; Secure Digital Extended Capacity

Focusing
- Focus modes: AI Focus, One-Shot, AI Servo
- Focus areas: 9 AF points

Exposure/metering
- Exposure modes: Full Auto, Portrait, Landscape, Close-up, Sports, Night Portrait, No Flash, Program AE, Shutter-priority, Aperture-priority, Manual, Auto Depth-of-field, Creative Auto
- Exposure metering: Full aperture TTL, 63 zone iFCL SPC
- Metering modes: Evaluative, Partial (approx. 10% at center of viewfinder), Center-weighted average

Flash
- Flash: E-TTL II automatic built-in pop-up, 13m ISO 100 guide number, 27mm (equivalent in 135 format) lens focal length coverage; compatible with Canon EX Series Speedlite external hotshoe-mount flashes
- Flash bracketing: Yes

Shutter
- Shutter: focal-plane
- Shutter speed range: 1/4000 to 30 s and Bulb, 1/200 s X-sync
- Continuous shooting: 3 fps for 830 JPEG frames or 2 fps for 5 RAW frames

Viewfinder
- Viewfinder: Eye-level pentamirror SLR, 95% coverage, 0.87x magnification / LCD (Live View)

Image processing
- Image processor: DIGIC 4
- White balance: Auto, Daylight, Shade, Cloudy, Tungsten Light, White Fluorescent Light, Flash, Manual, user-set
- WB bracketing: ± 3 stops in 1-stop increments;

General
- LCD screen: 2.7 in color TFT LCD, 230,000 pixels
- Battery: LP-E10 Battery Pack
- Dimensions: 130 mm × 100 mm × 78 mm (5.11 in × 3.93 in × 3.07 in)
- Weight: 495 g (17 oz) (1.091 lb) (body only)
- Made in: Taiwan

Chronology
- Predecessor: Canon EOS 1000D
- Successor: Canon EOS 1200D

Canon EOS 1100D is a 12.2-megapixel digital single-lens reflex camera announced by Canon on 7 February 2011. It is known as the EOS Kiss X50 in Japan and the EOS Rebel T3 in the Americas. The 1100D is Canon's most basic entry-level DSLR, and introduces movie mode to other entry level DSLRs. It replaced the 1000D and is also the only Canon EOS model currently in production that is not made in Japan but in Taiwan, aside from the EOS Rebel T4i.

Canon announced in February 2014 that the 1100D was replaced by the 1200D/Rebel T5.

== Features ==
- 12.2 effective megapixel APS-C CMOS sensor.
- DIGIC IV Image Processor.
- 2.7-inch in color TFT LCD monitor with 230,000-dot resolution.
- Sensor Crop Factor: 1.6x
- Sensor Size : APS-C 22.2x14.7mm
- Longer battery life: 700 shots
- Less startup delay: 100 ms
- Slightly lower noise at high ISO: 755 ISO
- Continuous Drive up to 3 frames per second for 830 JPEG frames or 2 frames per second for 5 RAW frames.
- ISO sensitivity 100–6,400.
- Canon EF/EF-S lenses.
- sRGB and Adobe RGB colour spaces
- SD, SDHC, and SDXC memory card file storage
- File formats include: JPEG, RAW (14-bit CR2).
- 720p HD video at 25 or 30 fps
- Unlike many other Canon DSLRs the EOS 1100D model comes in three different body colors other than black: red, grey and brown. As of 2017 the only other Canon DSLR cameras which offered additional colors were EOS 100D and EOS 300D which were available in white.

== Dials ==
=== Creative Zone ===
- A-DEP (Auto Depth-of-field AE): The camera automatically selects the aperture and shutter speed to keep most of the image in focus. (Only recommended in high light conditions as the camera tends to choose smaller f/stops)
- M (Manual): The camera lets you choose manually the aperture and shutter speed.
- Av (Aperture priority): The camera lets the user choose the aperture (f/) value and then automatically adjusts the shutter speed for correct exposure.
- Tv (Shutter speed priority): The camera lets the user set the shutter speed and automatically sets the aperture for correct exposure.
- P (Program AE): The camera automatically chooses an aperture and shutter combination for correct exposure and the user can change between one of these combinations.

=== Basic Zone ===
- Full Auto (represented with a green rectangle): Completely automatic shooting.
- Creative Auto: is a camera setting that's designed to aid new users in achieving good quality results without having to learn and understand all of the camera's functions and how exposure is set.
- No Flash: All automatic with no flash.
- Portrait: The camera attempts to create a more shallow depth of field to create more striking portraits.
- Landscape: For shooting landscapes and sunsets.
- Close-Up: For shooting small objects near to the camera.
- Sports: For capturing fast moving objects.
- Night Portrait: Shoots with flash and with slow shutter so that the subject is illuminated by the flash and the background (e.g. a city) is also captured naturally in the night.

== Video recording ==
The 1100D captures 720p video, it does not have continuous auto-focus while filming video; to keep a moving subject in focus the user must either trigger the auto-focus, as when shooting stills, or manually adjust the focus while recording.

Type	Sensor	Class	00	01	02	03	04	05	06	07	08	09	10	11	12	13	14	15	16	17	18	19	20	21	22	23	24	25	26
DSLR	Full-frame	Flagship				1Ds		1Ds Mk II			1Ds Mk III					1D C													
DSLR	Full-frame	Flagship				1Ds		1Ds Mk II			1Ds Mk III				1D X					1D X Mk II ^{T}			1D X Mk III ^{T}						
DSLR	APS-H	Flagship			1D			1D Mk II	1D Mk II N		1D Mk III		1D Mk IV																
DSLR	Full-frame	Professional																	5DS / 5DS R										
DSLR	Full-frame	Professional							5D			_{x} 5D Mk II			_{x} 5D Mk III					5D Mk IV ^{T}									
DSLR	Full-frame	Advanced														_{x} 6D					_{x} 6D Mk II ^{AT}								
DSLR	APS-C	Advanced											_{x} 7D					_{x} 7D Mk II											
DSLR	APS-C	Mid-range						20Da								_{x} 60Da ^{A}													
DSLR	APS-C	Mid-range		D30	D60	10D		20D	30D		40D	_{x} 50D		_{x} 60D ^{A}			_{x} 70D ^{AT}		80D ^{AT}				90D ^{AT}						
DSLR	APS-C	Mid-range																	760D ^{AT}		77D ^{AT}								
DSLR	APS-C	Entry-level					300D	350D		400D	450D	_{x} 500D	_{x} 550D	_{x} 600D ^{A}		_{x} 650D ^{AT}	_{x} 700D ^{AT}		_{x} 750D ^{AT}		800D ^{AT}			850D ^{AT}					
DSLR	APS-C	Entry-level															_{x} 100D ^{T}		_{x} 200D ^{AT}				250D ^{AT}						
DSLR	APS-C	Entry-level										1000D		_{x} 1100D			_{x} 1200D			1300D		2000D							
DSLR	APS-C	Value																				4000D							
Early models			Canon EOS DCS 5 (1995); Canon EOS DCS 3 (1995); Canon EOS DCS 1 (1995); Canon EOS D2000 (1998); Canon EOS D6000 (1998)																										
Type	Sensor	Spec																											
Type	Sensor	Spec	00	01	02	03	04	05	06	07	08	09	10	11	12	13	14	15	16	17	18	19	20	21	22	23	24	25	26
