= Canon EF-S 60mm f/2.8 Macro USM lens =

EF-S 60mm Macro USM
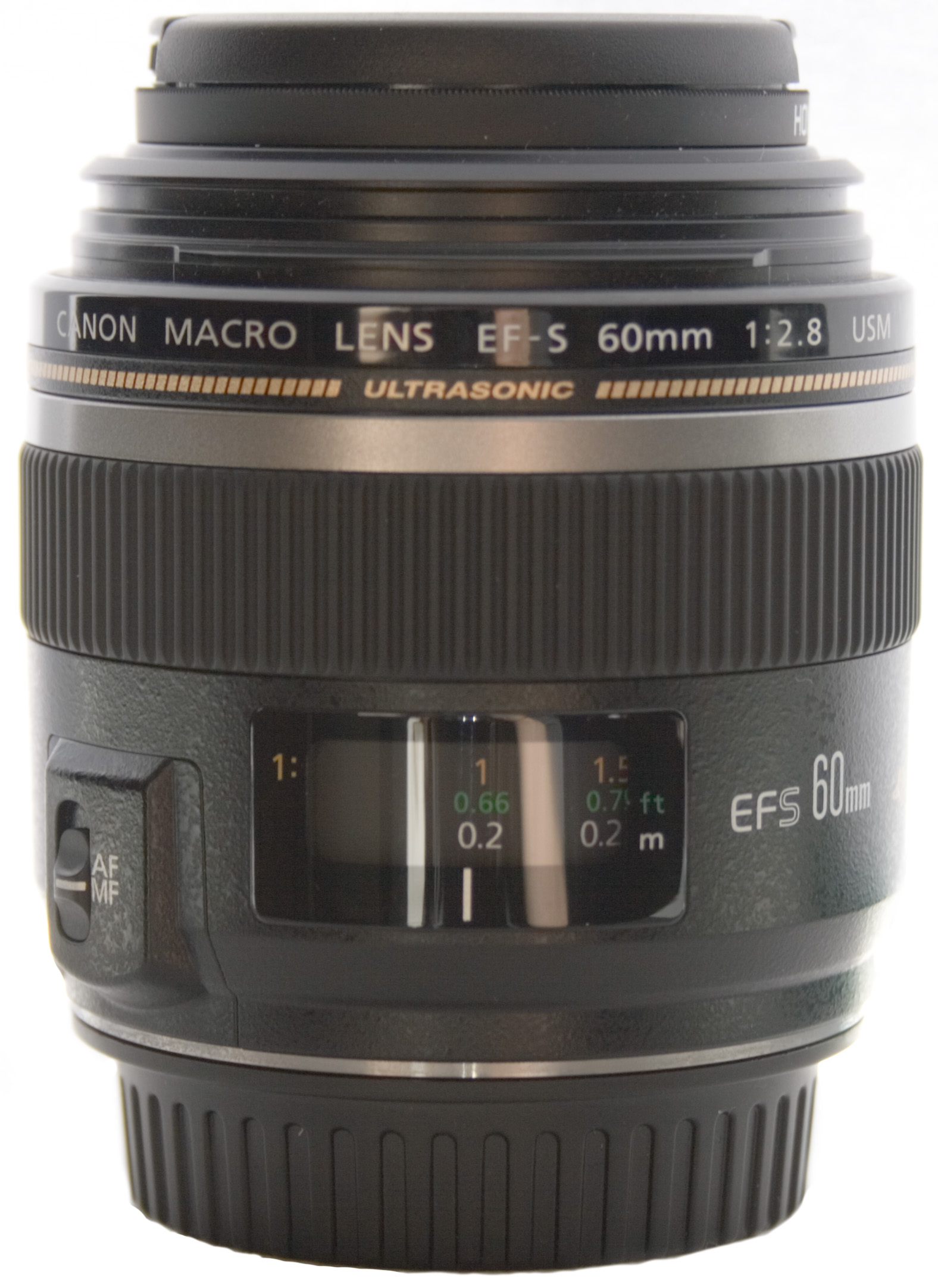
- Maker: Canon

Technical data
- Type: Prime
- Focus drive: Ultrasonic motor
- Focal length: 60mm
- Crop factor: APS-C
- Aperture (max/min): f/2.8 – f/32
- Close focus distance: 0.20 m (7.9 in)
- Max. magnification: 1:1
- Diaphragm blades: 7
- Construction: 12 elements in 8 groups

Features
- Short back focus: Yes Yes
- Lens-based stabilization: No No
- Macro capable: Yes Yes
- Unique features: 1:1 macro
- Application: Macro/portrait

Physical
- Max. length: 69.8 mm
- Diameter: 73 mm
- Weight: 335 g (0.74 lb)
- Filter diameter: 52 mm

Accessories
- Lens hood: ET-67B

Angle of view
- Horizontal: 20° 40'
- Vertical: 14° 10'
- Diagonal: 25° 30'

History
- Introduction: 2005
- Discontinuation: 2021

Retail info
- MSRP: 400 USD

The Canon EF-S 60mm f/2.8 Macro USM lens is Canon's first EF-S (APS-C sensor-specific) macro lens, and also the company's first prime lens made specifically for the EF-S mount. Introduced in 2005, it was the only EF-S prime lens until the announcement of the EF-S 24mm f/2.8 STM in September 2014; a second EF-S macro lens, the EF-S 35mm f/2.8 Macro IS STM, was added to the lens lineup in April 2017. As an EF-S lens, it can only be used on cameras with a 1.6x crop factor and is the equivalent of a 96mm lens mounted on a 35mm format camera. As such this lens also can be a good choice for portrait photography.

Its front element does not rotate, nor does it protrude when focusing. This is especially useful when working with a polarization filter or close to the subject.

The circular aperture results in a pleasantly soft bokeh.

== Example images ==
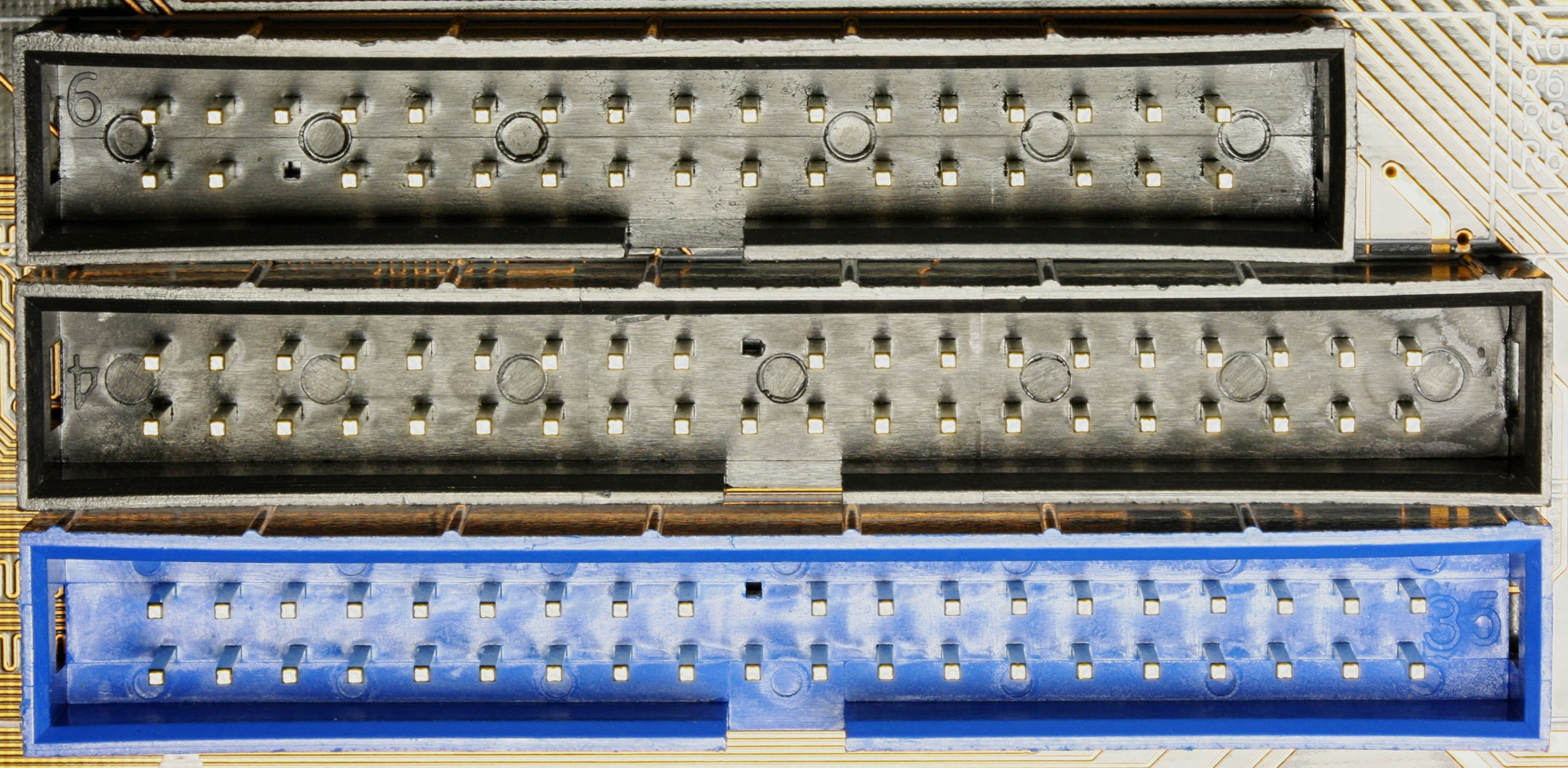
Parallel ATA connections on a motherboard

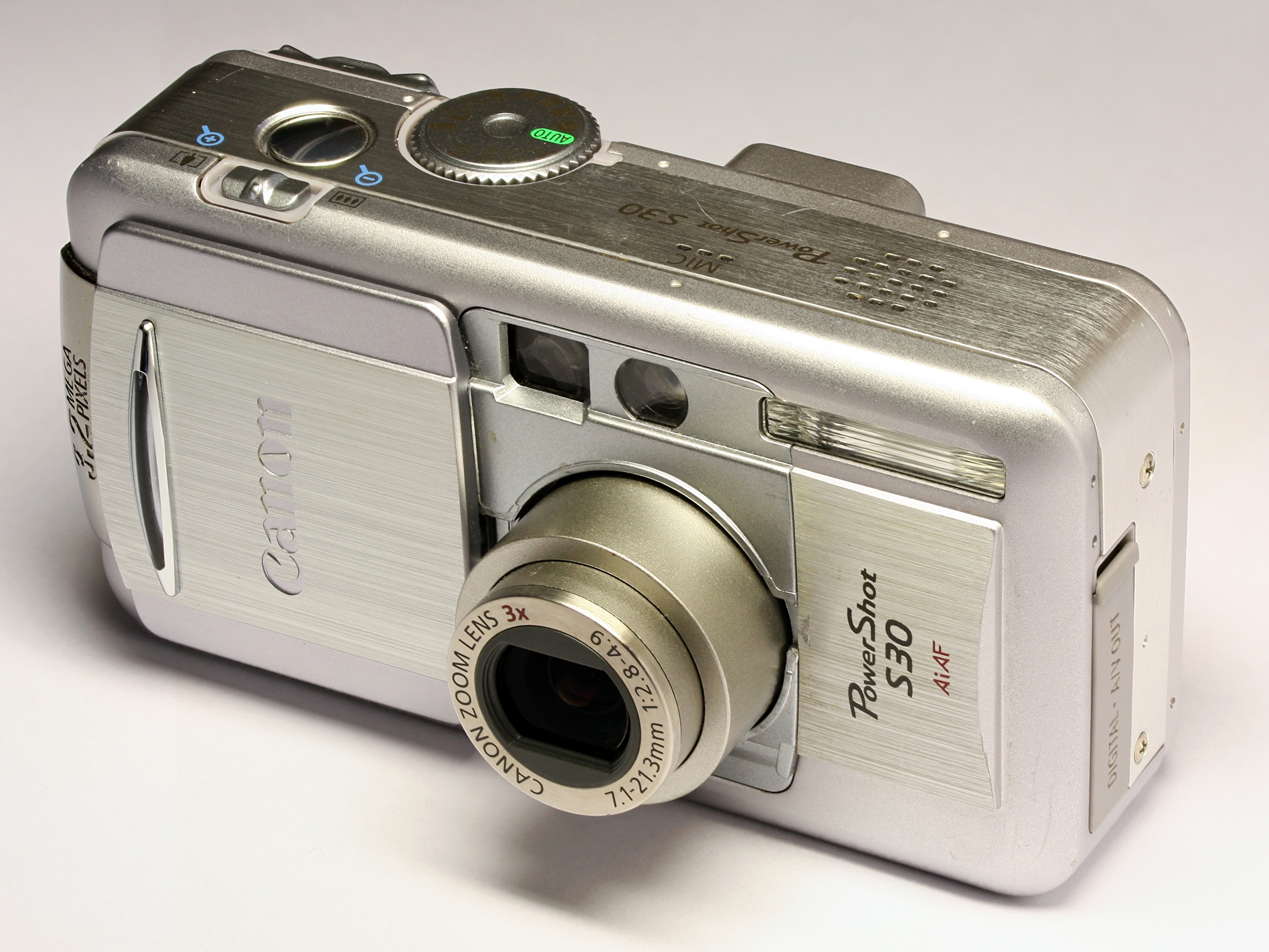
A Canon PowerShot S30

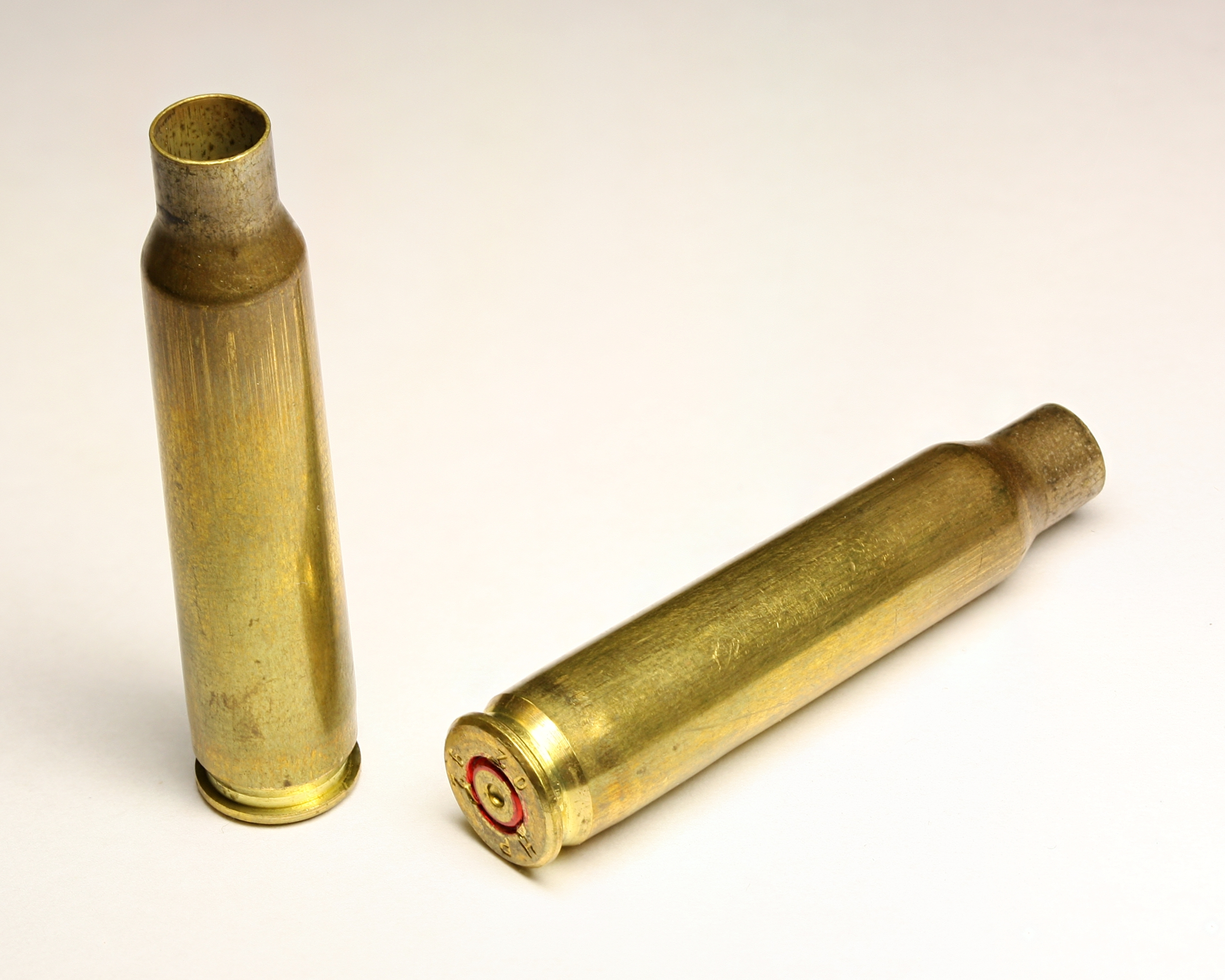
Bullet casings of a 5.56×45mm NATO cartridge

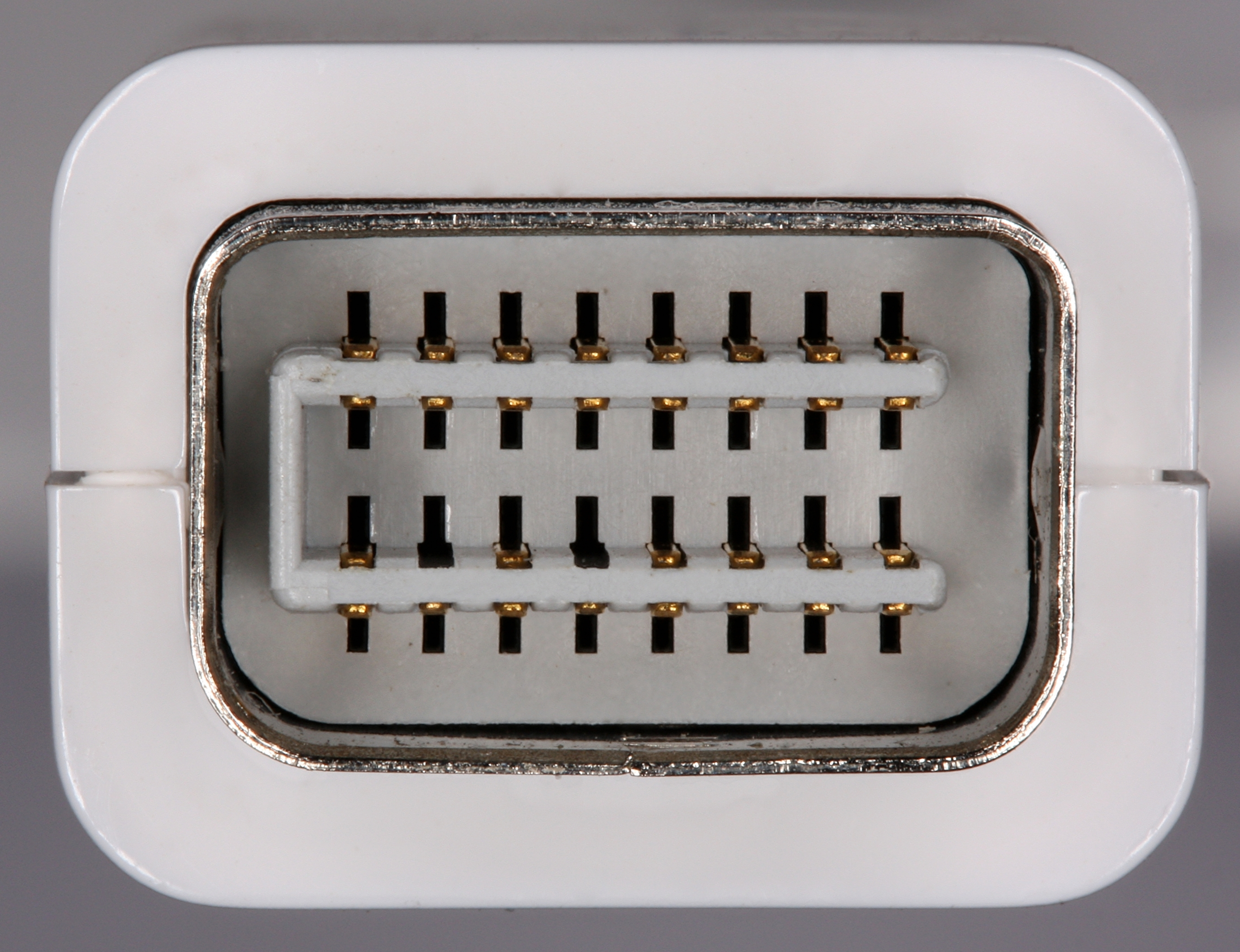
Front view of a male Mini-DVI connector

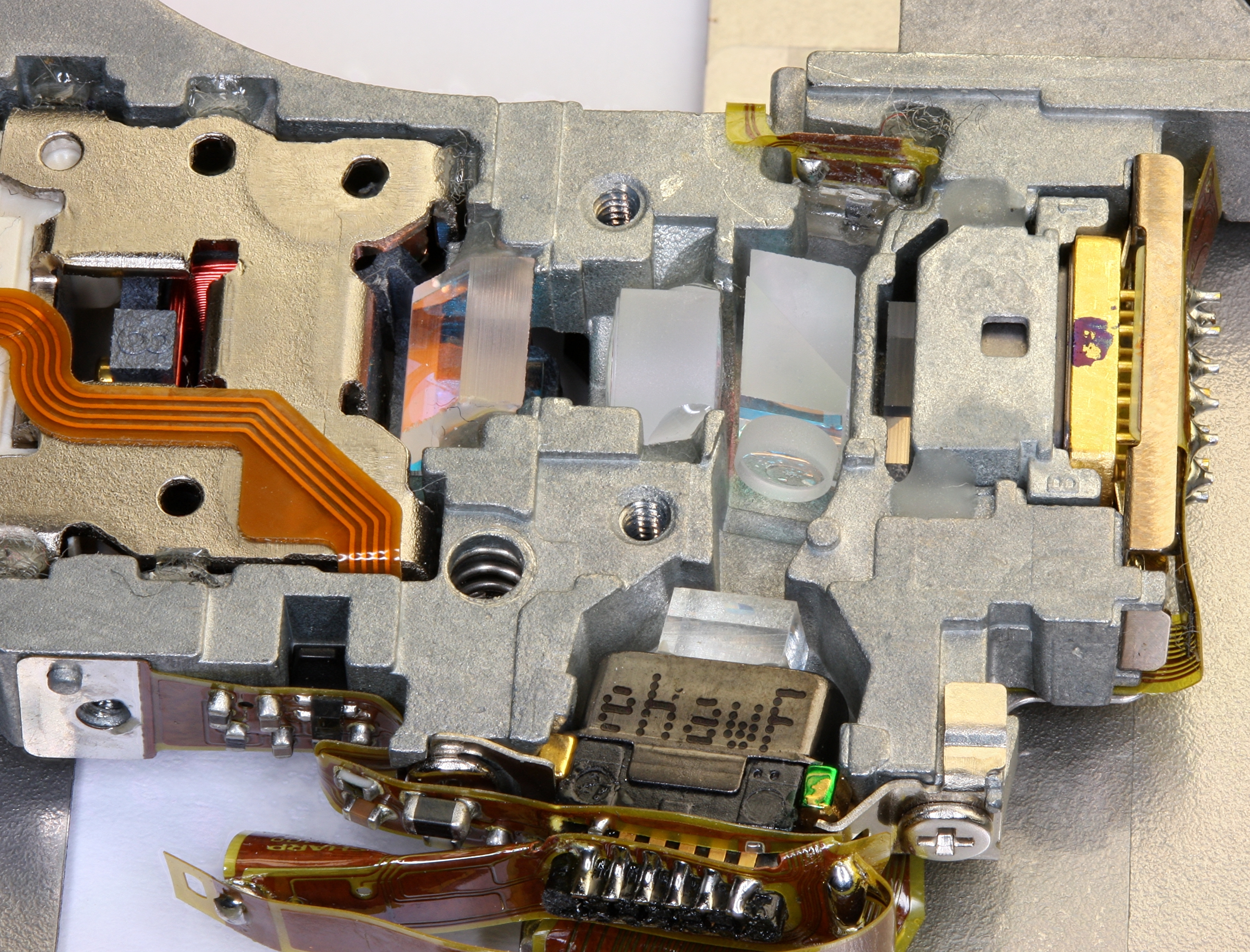
The laser of a DVD burner in SlimLine design

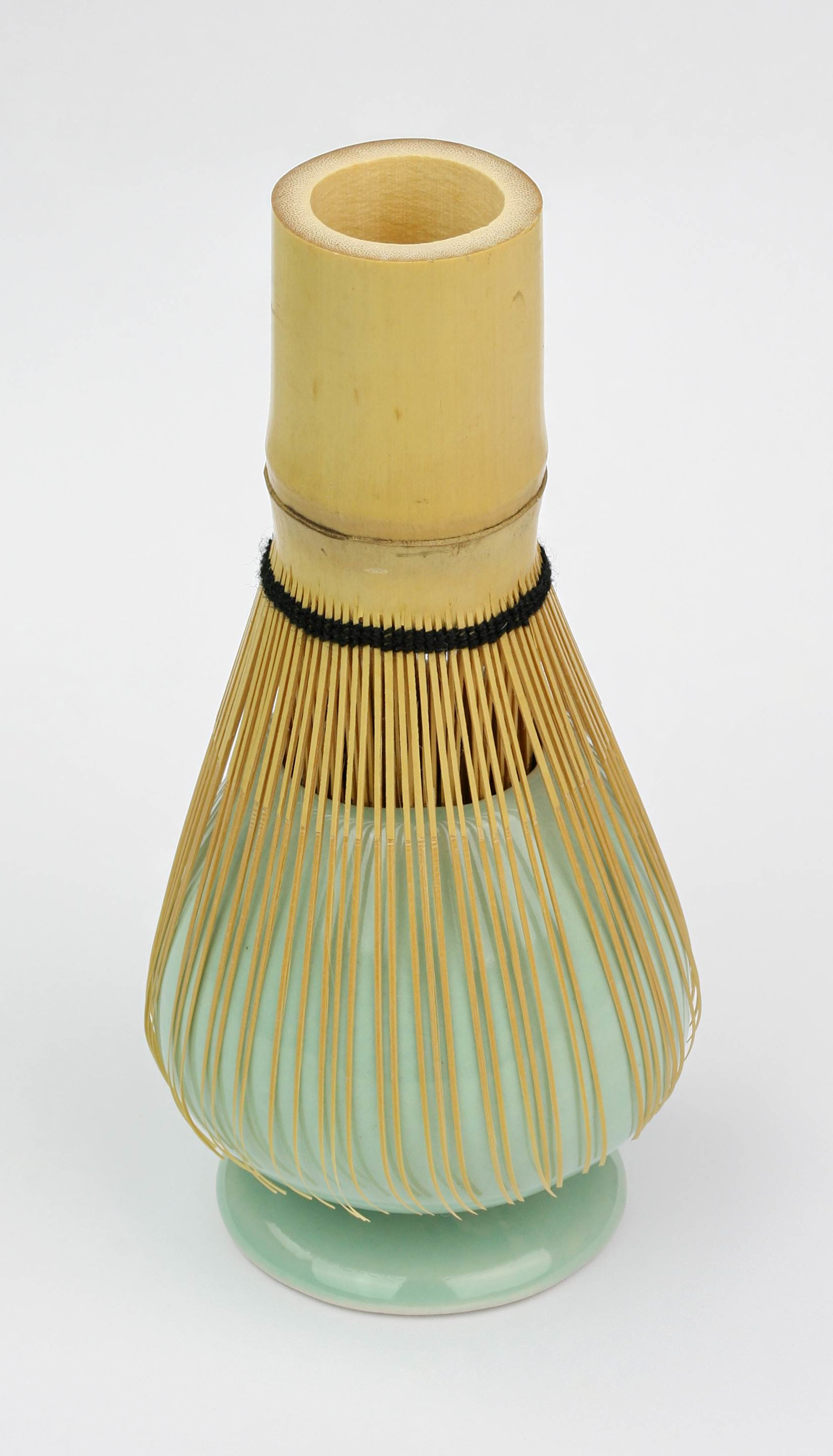
A chasen kusenaoshi (holding vessel for a chasen) used for the Japanese tea ceremony
