= Canon EF-S 55–250mm lens =

Series of camera lenses manufactured by Canon

The Canon EF-S 55–250mm f/4–5.6 IS lenses are a series of telephoto zoom lenses for Canon EOS digital single-lens reflex cameras with a Canon EF-S lens mount.

All versions of the lens provide a 35 mm equivalent focal length of 88–400mm, and are advertised by Canon as providing four-stop image stabilization. Additionally, it has a high maximum magnification ratio for a non-macro lens.

The first lens was released in America in mid-April 2008 for a retail price of US$255, and advertised as a companion to the Canon EF-S 18–55mm IS.

The Mark II version of the lens was announced June 2011, identical in specification to the previous version and featuring exactly the same optics and IS system but with a revised external design.

In August 2013 a new version of the lens was announced, featuring a revised optical formula and Canon's STM (stepping motor) technology. This lens shipped to retailers in late September 2013 and was initially priced at US$350.

== Specifications ==
Attribute	f/4–5.6 IS	f/4–5.6 IS II	f/4–5.6 IS STM
Image			
Key features
Full-frame compatible	No No		
Image stabilizer	Yes Yes		
Environmental sealing	No No		
Ultrasonic Motor	No No		
Stepping Motor	No No		Yes Yes
L-series	No No		
Diffractive Optics	No No		
Macro	No No		
Zoom Lock Lever	No No		
Technical data
Focal length (max/min)	55–250mm (35 mm equivalent of 88–400mm)		
Aperture (max/min)	f/4–5.6 / f/22–32		
Construction	12 elements / 10 groups		15 elements / 12 groups
# of diaphragm blades	7 (circular aperture)		
Closest focusing distance	1.1 m (3.61 ft)		0.85 m (2.79 ft)
Max. magnification	0.31x		0.29x
Horizontal viewing angle	23°20'–5°20'		
Vertical viewing angle	15°40'–3°30'		
Diagonal viewing angle	27°50'–6°15'		
Physical data
Weight	390 g (13.75 oz)		375 g (13.2 oz)
Maximum diameter	70 mm (2.76")		
Length	108 mm (4.25")		111.2 mm (4.7")
Filter diameter	58mm		
Accessories
Lens case	LP1019		
Lens hood	ET-60		ET-63
Retail information
Release date	November 2007	July 2011	August 2013
Currently in production?	No No	Yes Yes	Yes Yes
MSRP US$	$255.00	$299.99	$399.99

== Photographs taken with a Canon EOS M50m2 and the f/4–5.6 IS STM ==
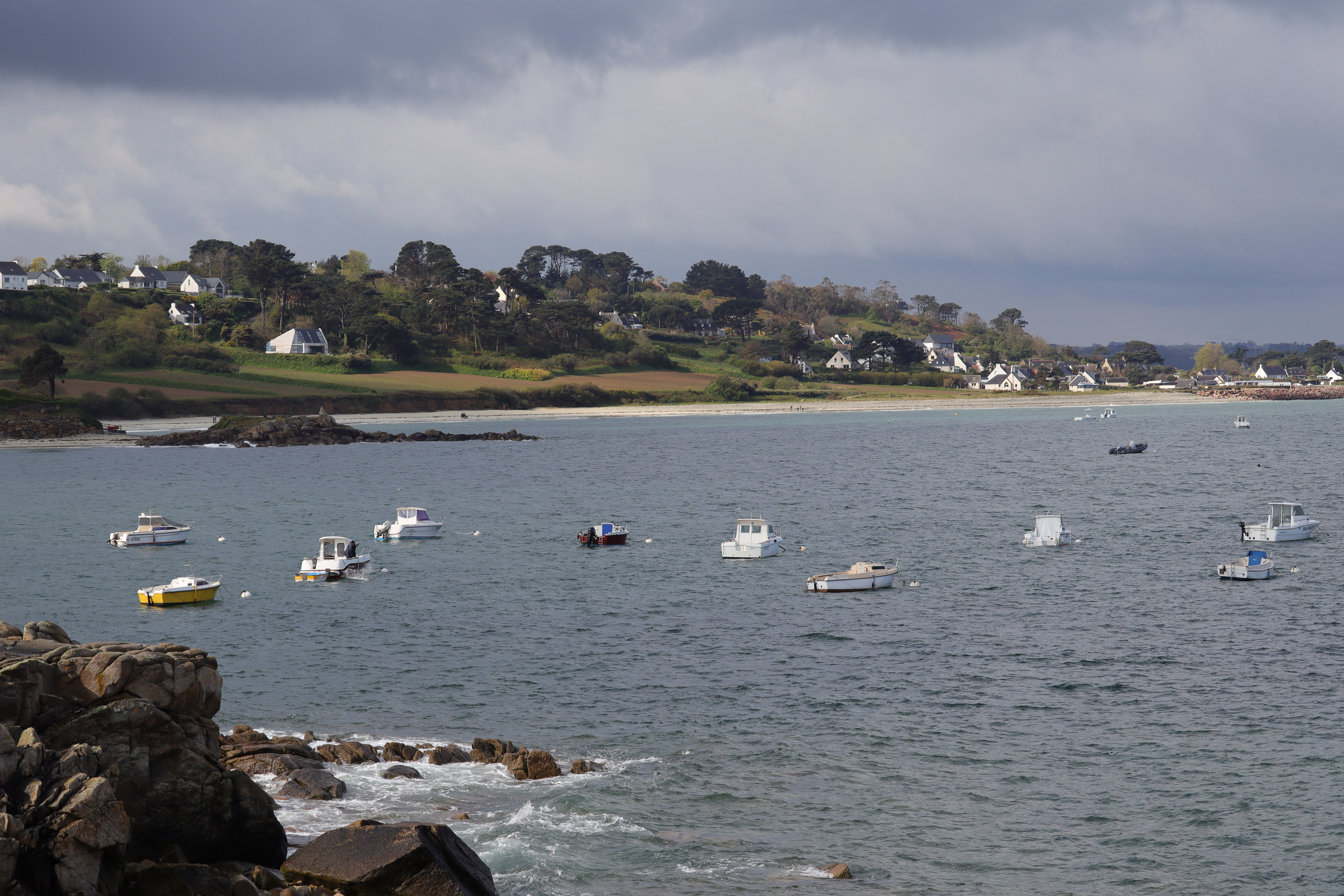

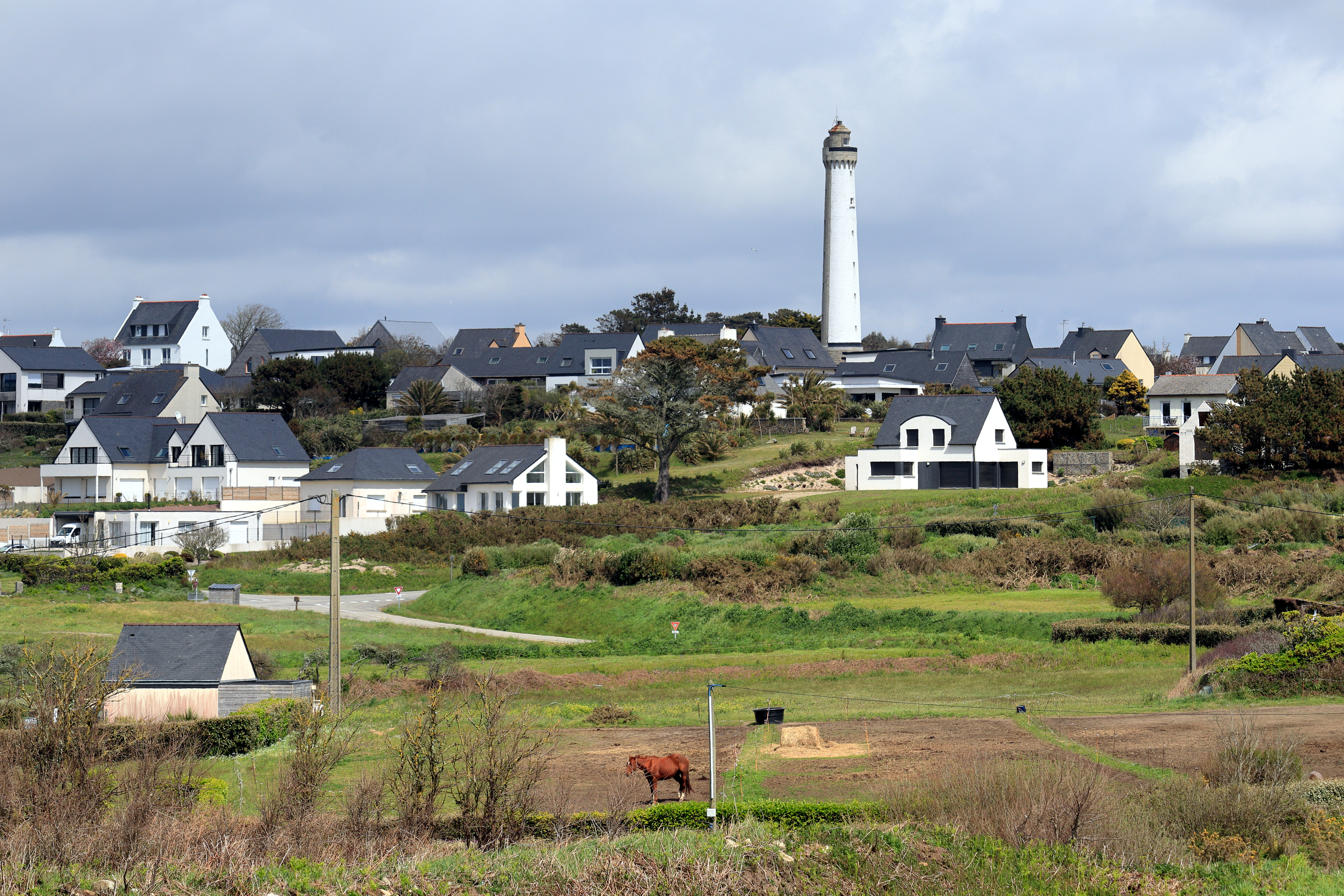

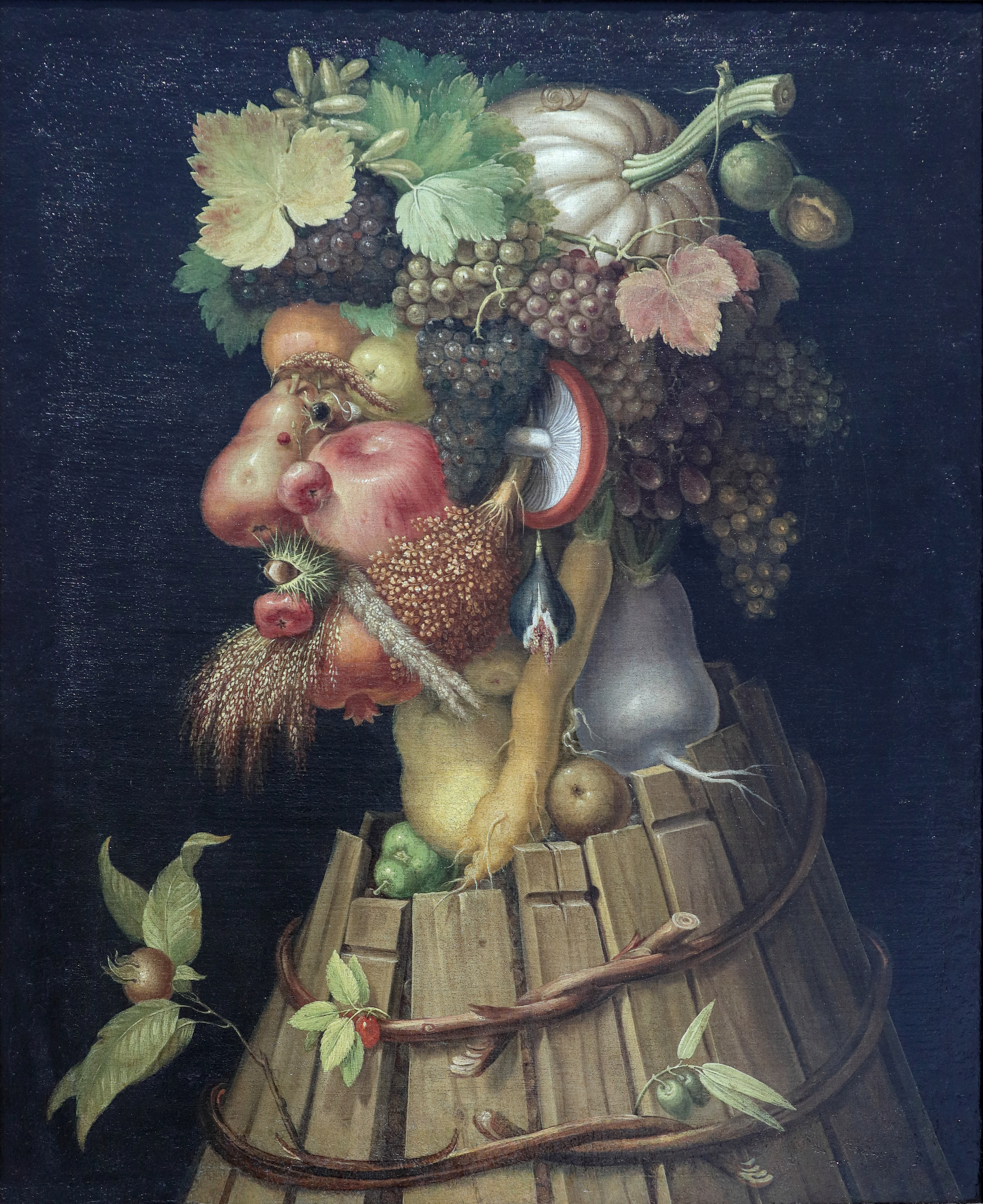
