= Canon EF-S lens mount =

Digital camera lens mount model

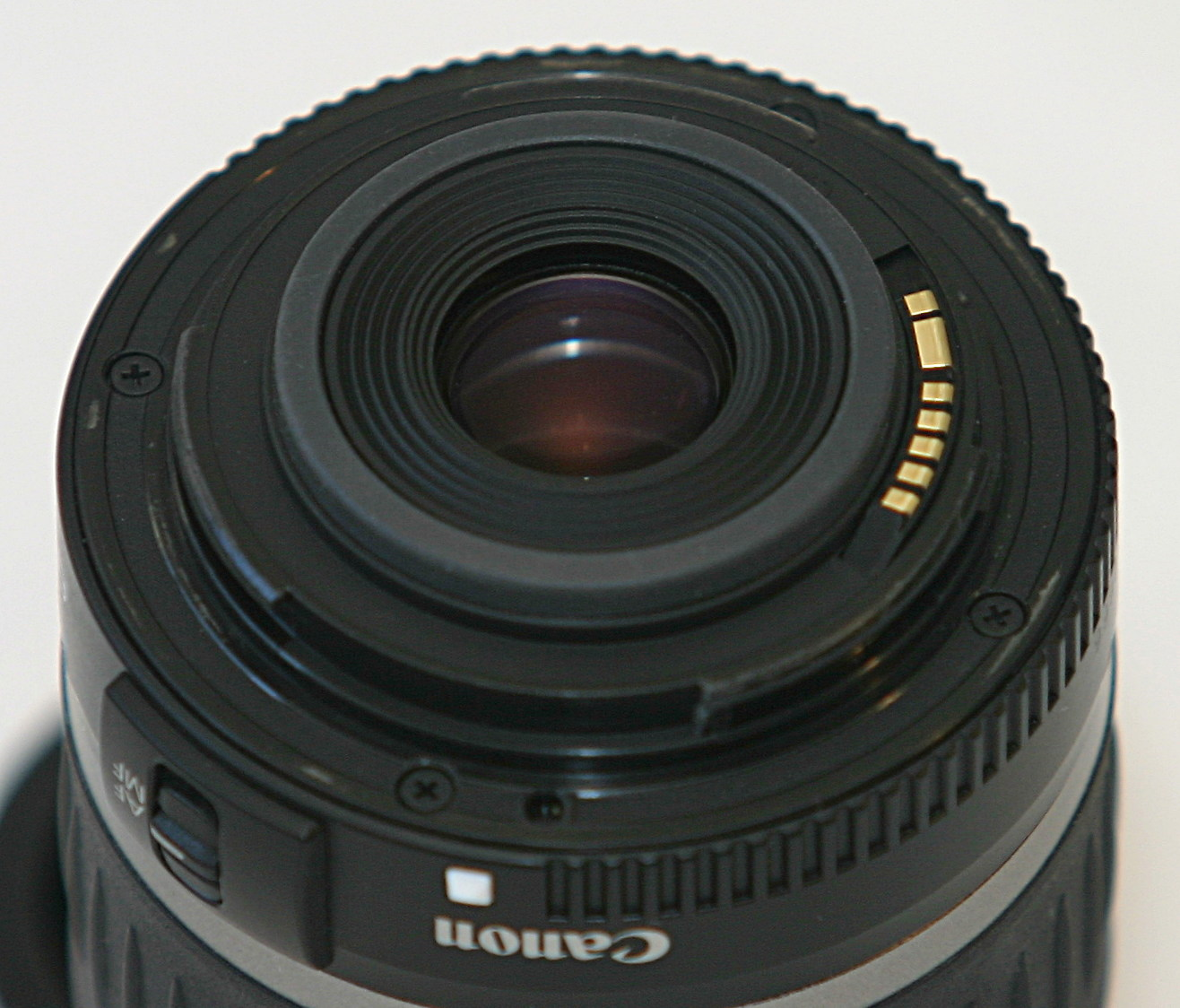
An example of a plastic EF-S lens mount.

The Canon EF-S lens mount is a derivative of the EF lens mount created for some Canon digital single-lens reflex cameras with APS-C sized image sensors. It was released in 2003. Cameras with the EF-S mount are backward compatible with the EF lenses and, as such, have a flange focal distance of 44.0 mm. Such cameras, however, have more clearance, allowing lens elements to be closer to the sensor than in the EF mount. Only Canon cameras released after 2003 with APS-C sized sensors support the EF-S mount.

The "S" in EF-S has variously been described by Canon as coming from either "Small image circle" (the lens projects a smaller image circle than normal EF lenses to match the sensor), or "Short back focus" (the smaller mirror used in APS-C cameras also allows optical elements to protrude further into the camera body, reducing the minimum distance between the sensor and the back element of the lens). The combination of a smaller sensor and shorter back focal length distance enhances the possibilities for wide angle and very wide angle lenses. Such lenses designed for the EF-S mount can be made smaller, lighter (containing less glass), faster (larger aperture) and less expensive.

Although not all Canon EF-S lenses use this short back focal length, they cannot be mounted on DSLRs with sensors larger than APS-C. However, some lenses produced by third-party manufacturers may feature the standard EF mount if they do not have the shorter back focal length but only have a small image circle. Such lenses will give noticeable vignetting or unsharp outer areas if used on a 35mm film or full frame sensor cameras. To a lesser degree, vignetting also occurs with APS-H sensor sizes, such as several (now discontinued) cameras of the 1D series.

== Compatibility ==
The cameras that can use the EF-S mount are:

- EOS 7D
- EOS 7D Mark II
- EOS 20D
- EOS 20Da
- EOS 30D
- EOS 40D
- EOS 50D
- EOS 60D
- EOS 60Da
- EOS 70D
- EOS 77D
- EOS 80D
- EOS 90D
- EOS 100D/Rebel SL1
- EOS 200D/Rebel SL2
- EOS 250D/Rebel SL3
- EOS 300D/Digital Rebel
- EOS 350D/Digital Rebel XT
- EOS 400D/Digital Rebel XTi
- EOS 450D/Rebel XSi
- EOS 500D/Rebel T1i
- EOS 550D/Rebel T2i
- EOS 600D/Rebel T3i
- EOS 650D/Rebel T4i
- EOS 700D/Rebel T5i
- EOS 750D/Rebel T6i
- EOS 760D/Rebel T6s
- EOS 800D/Rebel T7i
- EOS 850D/Rebel T8i
- EOS 1000D/Rebel XS
- EOS 1100D/Rebel T3
- EOS 1200D/Rebel T5
- EOS 1300D/Rebel T6
- EOS 2000D/Rebel T7
- EOS 4000D/Rebel T100
- Canon EOS C100
- Canon EOS C200
- Canon EOS C300
- Canon EOS C500
- Blackmagic Pocket Cinema Camera 6K
- Blackmagic Studio Camera 6K Pro

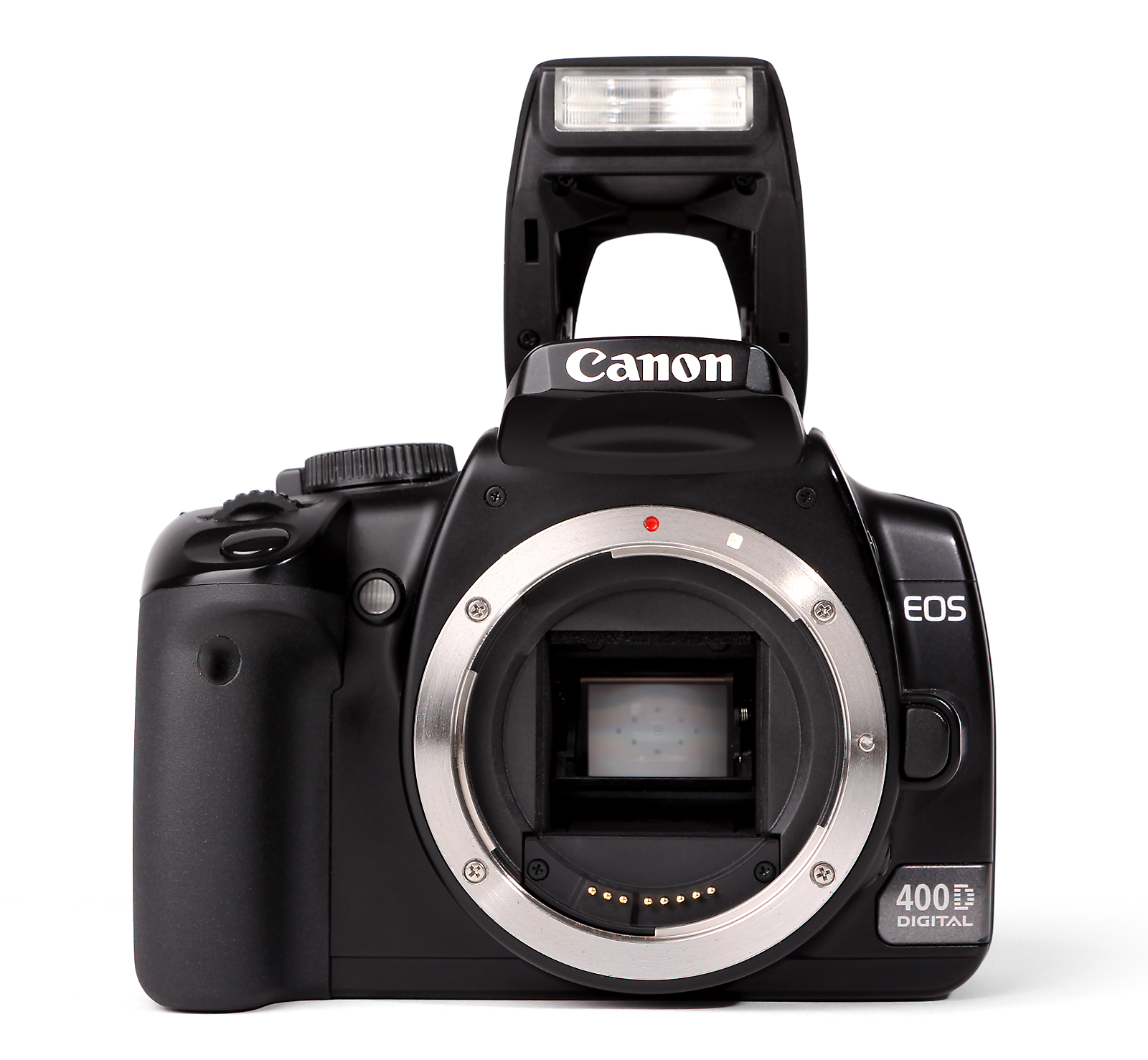
An EF-S compatible body, the Canon EOS 400D, with open lens mount

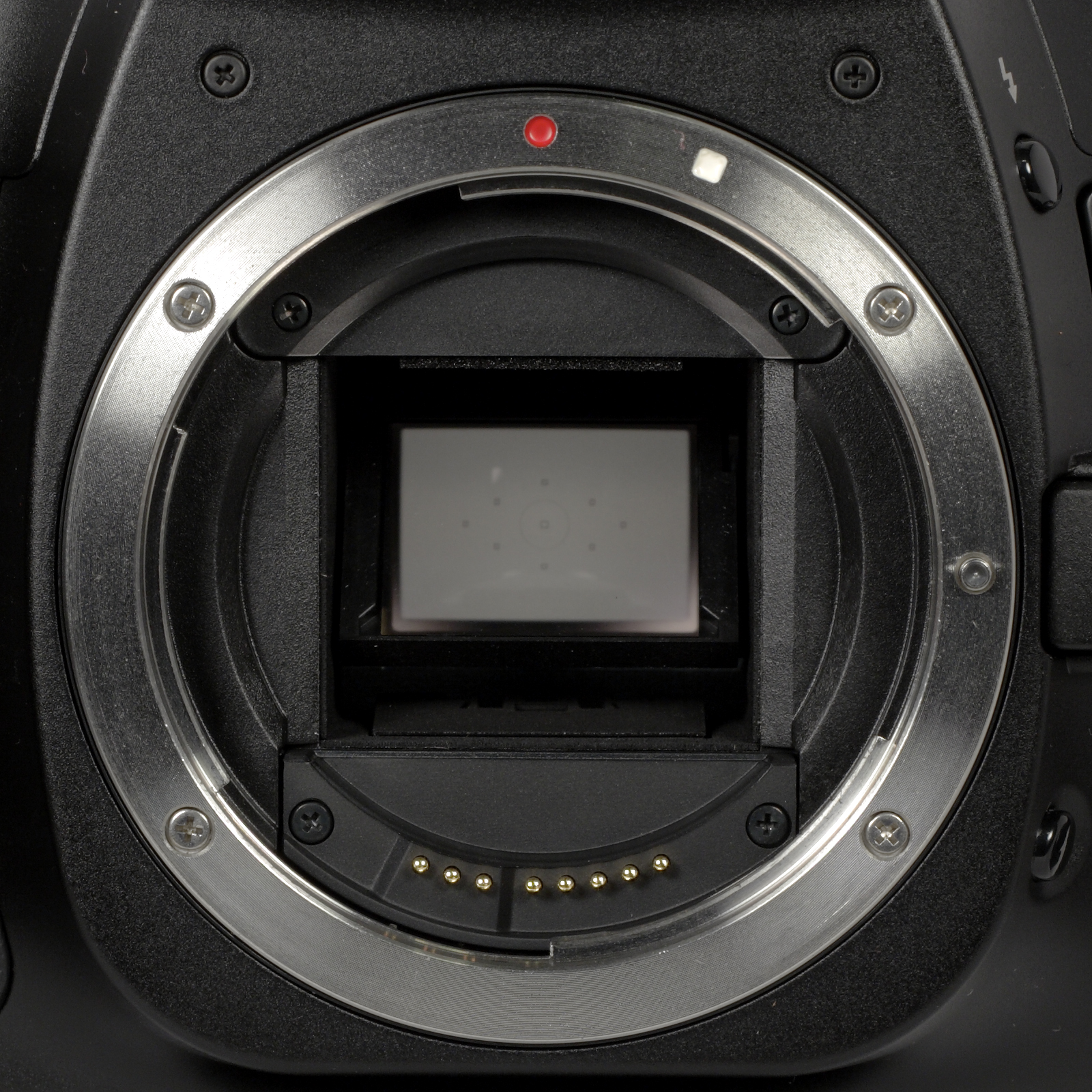
An EF-S compatible mount close-up, from the Canon 30D. Note the circular indent inside the mount, which corresponds to the raised ring on the lens.

By design, it is physically impossible to mount EF-S lenses on EF-only cameras. This is because the increased proximity of the lens to the sensor means that on full-frame sensor or 35mm film EF cameras the lens itself would obstruct the mirror's movement and cause damage to the lens and/or camera. While it is possible to modify the lens such that the physical obstruction is removed, allowing for mounting to EF mount cameras, the rear of the lens would still obstruct the mirror. An additional reason is that the lenses produce a smaller image circle of even illumination (circle of no vignetting). An EF-S lens alignment mark is indicated by a small white rectangle, whereas the EF employs a small red dot. The lens will insert into the body when the alignment marks on each are matched, and the lens can then be rotated and locked into the operating position. EF-S camera bodies have both EF-S and EF alignment marks, while EF bodies have only EF marks. Some have reported success attaching EF-S lenses to full-frame bodies with the use of an extension tube; however, this does not eliminate the vignetting problem, and also removes the lens's ability to achieve infinity focus. Also, attachment of EF-S lenses on EF bodies can often be accomplished by removing the small plastic ring seen in the photo above. Although vignetting is still an issue, photos can be taken, and infinity focus achieved. This modification comes with caveats, one being that on some lenses, like the EF-S 10-22mm, at the 10mm setting, the element protrudes too far back toward EF mount camera bodies.

The 10D, D60, D30, and earlier cameras share the EF-only mount with the full frame EOS camera bodies, and also with the APS-H size EOS camera bodies (1D series prior to the 1D X), despite having a smaller sensor and therefore a smaller mirror.

== List of EF-S lenses ==
The EF-S lens mount is a discontinued offering from Canon, and the selection of available lenses is limited compared to the full EF range, but it is backward compatible with the EF mount, and can therefore still accept all EF lenses. The variety of EF-S prime lenses is very limited in comparison to EF-S zoom lenses, with three primes to nine zooms. EF-S lenses are very popular due to their lower cost and zoom lenses are preferred by amateur photographers. As of April 2017, no EF-S lens has been produced with the "L" designation or with diffractive optics, and only three EF-S prime lenses have been produced.

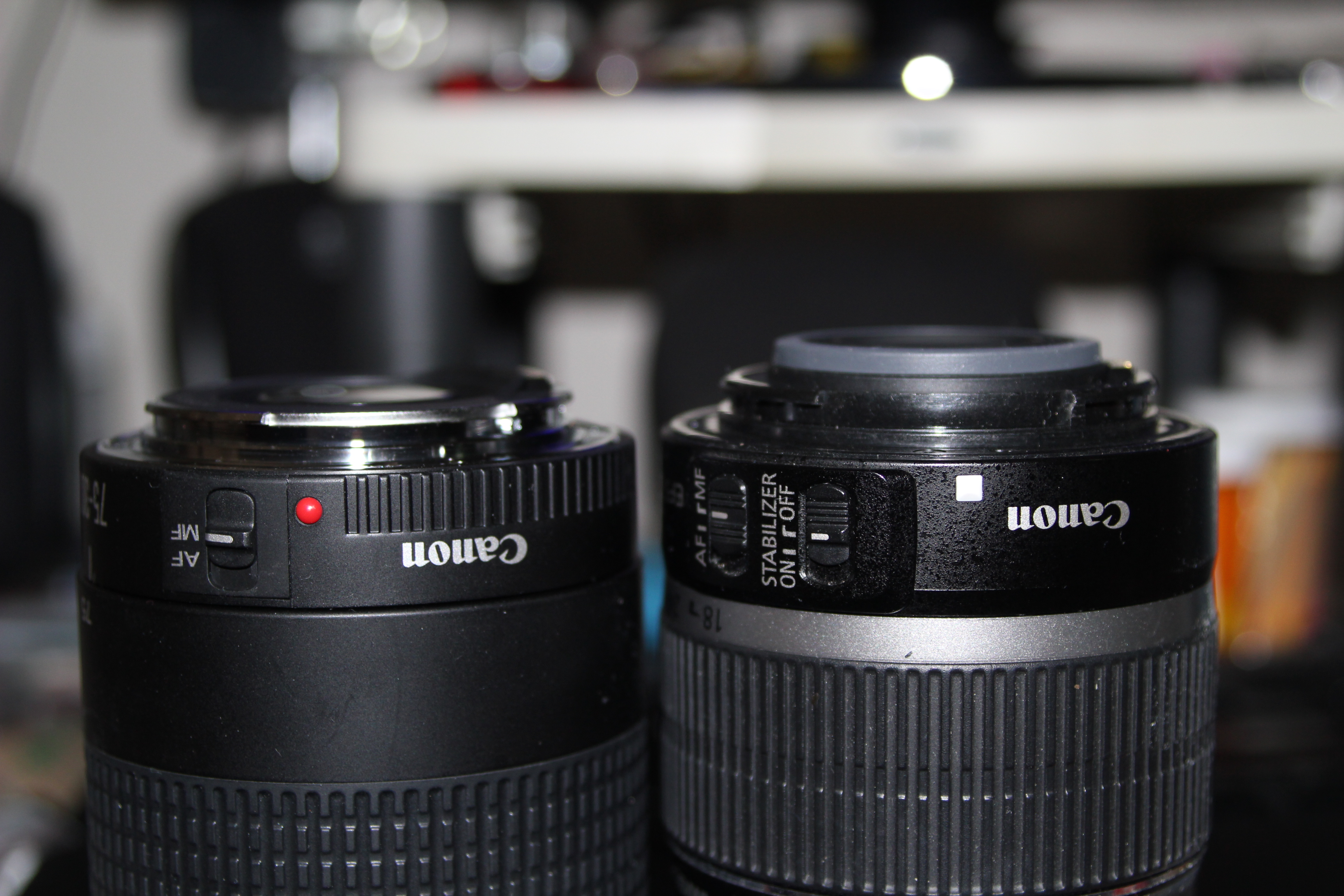
EF lens (left) and EF-S lens (right). Note raised ring on EF-S lens.

Focal length	Equivalent focal length (×1.6 crop factor)	Maximum Aperture range	Mark	Introduced	Macro	USM	STM	IS
10–18mm	16–28.8 mm	f/4.5–5.6	IS STM	2014	No	No	Yes	Yes
10–22mm	16–35.2 mm	f/3.5–4.5	USM	2004	No	Yes	No	No
15–85mm	24–136 mm	f/3.5–5.6	IS USM	2009	No	Yes	No	Yes
17–55mm	27.2–88 mm	f/2.8	IS USM	2006	No	Yes	No	Yes
17–85mm	27.2–136 mm	f/4–5.6	IS USM	2004	No	Yes	No	Yes
18–55mm	28.8–88 mm	f/3.5–5.6	I	2003	No	No	No	No
18–55mm	28.8–88 mm	f/3.5–5.6	I (Jpn.)	2003	No	Yes	No	No
18–55mm	28.8–88 mm	f/3.5–5.6	II	2005	No	No	No	No
18–55mm	28.8–88 mm	f/3.5–5.6	II (Jpn.)	2005	No	Yes	No	No
18–55mm	28.8–88 mm	f/3.5–5.6	III	2011	No	No	No	No
18–55mm	28.8–88 mm	f/3.5–5.6	IS	2007	No	No	No	Yes
18–55mm	28.8–88 mm	f/3.5–5.6	IS II	2011	No	No	No	Yes
18–55mm	28.8–88 mm	f/3.5–5.6	IS STM	2013	No	No	Yes	Yes
18–55mm	28.8–88 mm	f/4–5.6	IS STM	2017	No	No	Yes	Yes
18–135mm	28.8–216 mm	f/3.5–5.6	IS	2009	No	No	No	Yes
18–135mm	28.8–216 mm	f/3.5–5.6	IS STM	2012	No	No	Yes	Yes
18–135mm	28.8–216 mm	f/3.5–5.6	IS USM	2016	No	Yes	No	Yes
18–200mm	28.8–320 mm	f/3.5–5.6	IS	2008	No	No	No	Yes
55–250mm	88–400 mm	f/4–5.6	IS	2007	No	No	No	Yes
55–250mm	88–400 mm	f/4–5.6	IS II	2011	No	No	No	Yes
55–250mm	88–400 mm	f/4–5.6	IS STM	2013	No	No	Yes	Yes
24mm	38.4 mm	f/2.8	STM	2014	No	No	Yes	No
35mm	56 mm	f/2.8	IS STM	2017	Yes	No	Yes	Yes
60mm	96 mm	f/2.8		2005	Yes	Yes	No	No

Type	Focal Length	2004	2005	2006	2007	2008	2009	2010	2011	2012	2013	2014	2015	2016	2017	2018	2019	2020	2021	2022
Prime	24mm											EF-S 24mm f/2.8 STM								
Prime	35mm														EF-S 35mm f/2.8 Macro IS STM					
Prime	60mm		EF-S 60mm f/2.8 Macro USM																	
Zoom	10-18mm											EF-S 10-18mm f/4.5-5.6 IS STM								
Zoom	10-22mm	EF-S 10-22mm f/3.5-4.5 USM																		
Zoom	15-85mm						EF-S 15-85mm f/3.5-5.6 IS USM													
Zoom	17-55mm			EF-S 17-55mm f/2.8 IS USM																
Zoom	17-85mm	EF-S 17-85mm f/4-5.6 IS USM																		
Zoom	18-55mm	f/3.5-5.6 USM	EF-S 18-55mm f/3.5-5.6 II USM																	
Zoom	18-55mm	f/3.5-5.6	EF-S 18-55mm f/3.5-5.6 II						III											
Zoom	18-55mm				EF-S 18-55mm f/3.5-5.6 IS				f/3.5-5.6 IS II											
Zoom	18-55mm										f/3.5-5.6 IS STM									
Zoom	18-135mm						EF-S 18-135mm f/3.5-5.6 IS							18-135mm IS USM						
Zoom	18-135mm									EF-S 18-135mm IS STM										
Zoom	18-200mm					EF-S 18-200mm f/3.5-5.6 IS														
Zoom	55-250mm				EF-S 55-250mm f/4-5.6 IS				II		STM									
