= Magic Lantern (firmware) =

Firmware add-on for the Canon EOS cameras by Trammell Hudson

- Original author: Trammell Hudson
- Release: 2009
- License: GNU GPLv2
- Website: www.magiclantern.fm
- Repository: github.com/reticulatedpines/magiclantern_simplified

Magic Lantern is a firmware add-on for various Canon digital single-lens reflex (DSLR) cameras and the EOS M. It adds features for DSLR filmmaking and still photography, and is free and open-source.

Magic Lantern was originally written for the Canon EOS 5D Mark II by Trammell Hudson in 2009 after he reverse engineered its firmware. He ported it to the Canon EOS 550D in July 2010. There are now versions for many other Canon DSLRs and the current lead developer is known as "names_are_hard", previous lead developer was "a1ex".

Since installing Magic Lantern does not replace the stock Canon firmware or modify the ROM but rather runs alongside it, it is both easy to remove and carries little risk. The camera checks a "boot flag" in its re-writable memory, and if set, reads from a memory card to get the additional firmware routines. Each time the camera is started, there is an option to disable Magic Lantern.

== History ==
Magic Lantern firmware was originally written for the Canon EOS 5D Mark II by Trammell Hudson in 2009 after he reverse engineered its firmware. He ported it to the Canon EOS 550D in July 2010.

Starting in September 2010, a person using the name "A1ex" on the CHDK (Canon Hack Development Kit) website forum and other people ported Magic Lantern to the Canon EOS 50D, 60D, 500D and 600D. As of August 2017 support for the Canon EOS 5D, 5D Mk III, 6D, 7D, 60Da, 650D, 700D, and 1100D DSLRs and the mirrorless EOS M had also been added. Later mirrorless cameras are not supported because they use a codebase similar to Canon PowerShot cameras rather than Canon EOS cameras; therefore CHDK ports are planned.

Around 2020, a1ex, after years of hard work, left the project. A very small number of volunteers kept things alive, but nothing worked well. Nobody had deep knowledge of Magic Lantern code. Those that remained had to learn how everything worked, then fix it. Then add support for new cams without breaking the old ones. Newly supported cameras (as of June 2025) includes the 200D, 6D Mk II, 750D, 7D Mk II

The new Magic Lantern Core Team consists of g3gg0, kitor, names_are_hard, and WalterSchulz

Originally developed for DSLR filmmaking, Magic Lantern's features have expanded to also include those for still photography.

== Features ==
- Firmware and source code is released under the GNU General Public License.
- Audio controls, on-screen audio meter, audio monitoring via A/V cable
- HDR video, bitrate control, FPS control, auto-restart
- Precise ISO, White Balance, and Shutter Speed controls
- Zebras, false color -- histogram, waveform, spot meter, vectorscope
- Focus peaking, 'magic zoom', trap focus, rack focus, follow focus, motion detection
- Automatic Exposure Bracketing, focus stacking
- Intervalometer, bulb timer (up to 8 hours), bulb ramping
- Custom cropmarks/on-screen graphics
- On-screen focus and DOF info, CMOS temperature, clock
- Customizable menus and scripting
- Customizable "P" Program mode
- 14-bit raw video on some DSLRs
- Dual-ISO for increased dynamic range up to about 3 EV, with trade-off of somewhat less resolution and more complicated post processing involving cr2dng
- Auto-Dot-Tune on some DSLRs for automatic micro-focus-adjustment to calibrate lens and body (5D Mk II, 6D, 50D, 5D Mk III and 7D)

== Selected screenshots of advanced functions ==
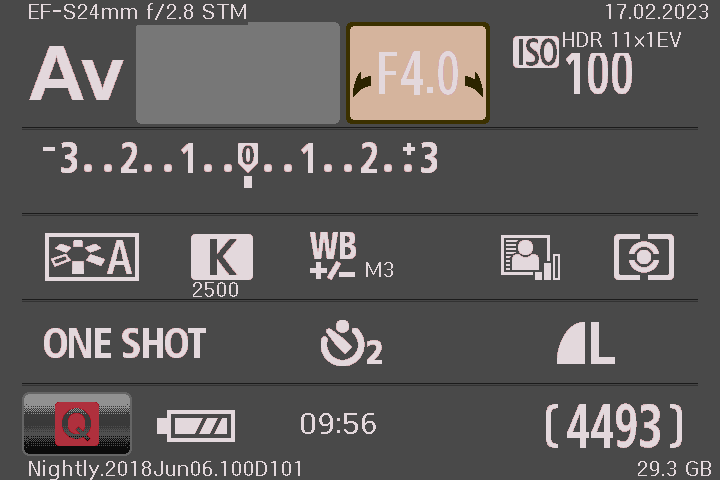
Main screen with additional information

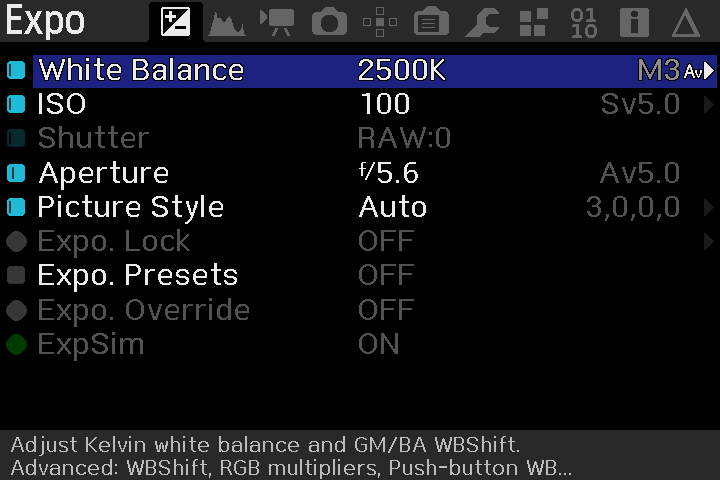
Expo menu with advanced exposure functions

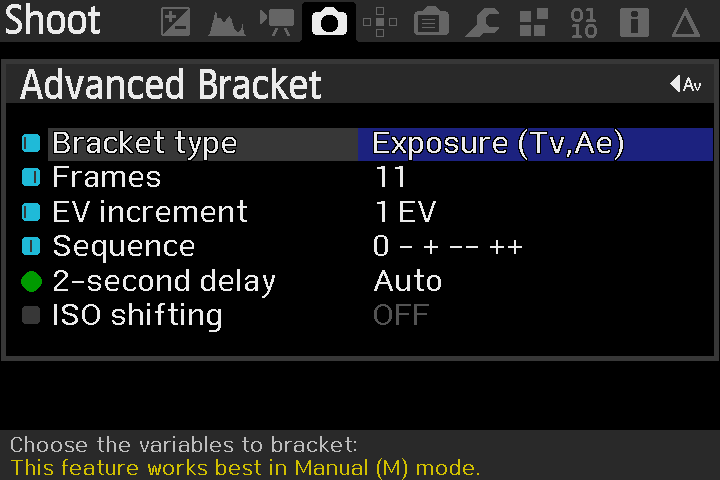
Advanced bracket options with up to 11 images

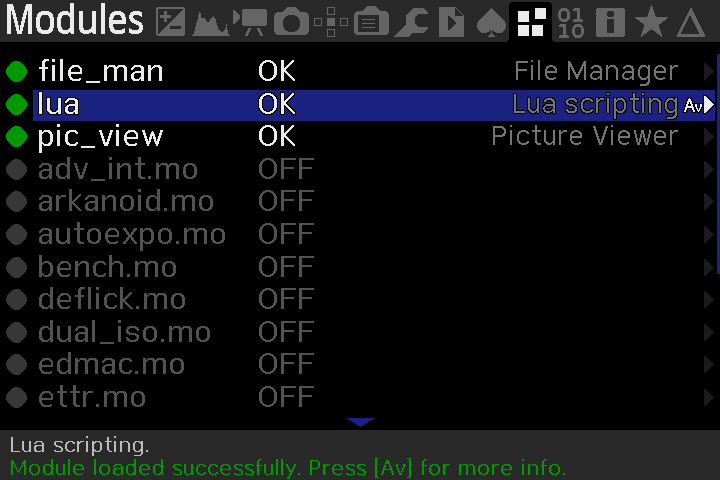
Extensibility via modules and Lua scripts

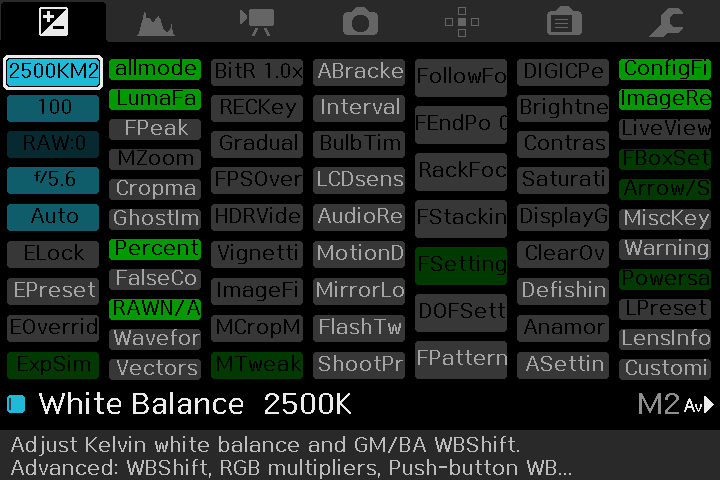
Overview screen of all functions

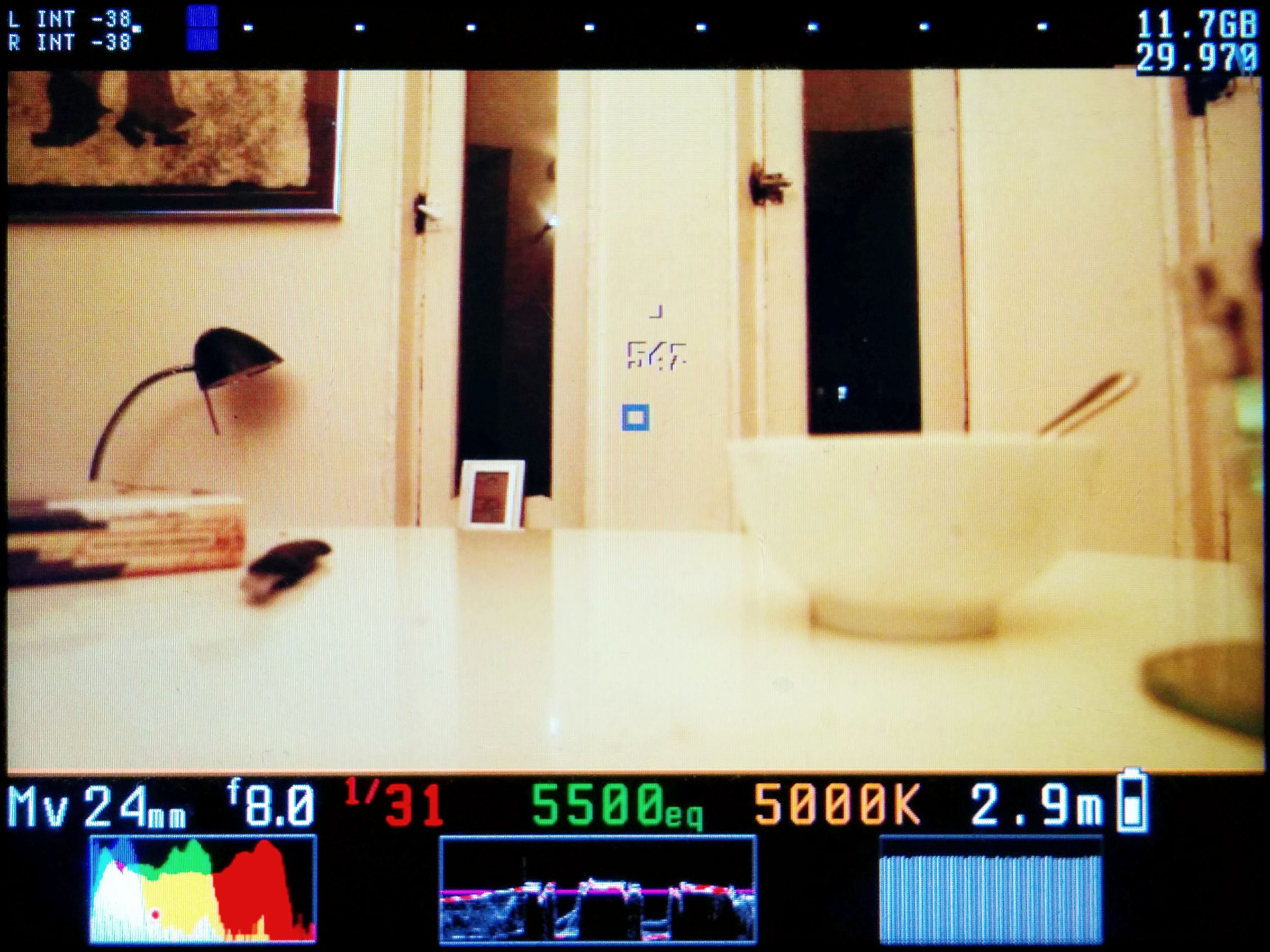
Overlays on the live view screen

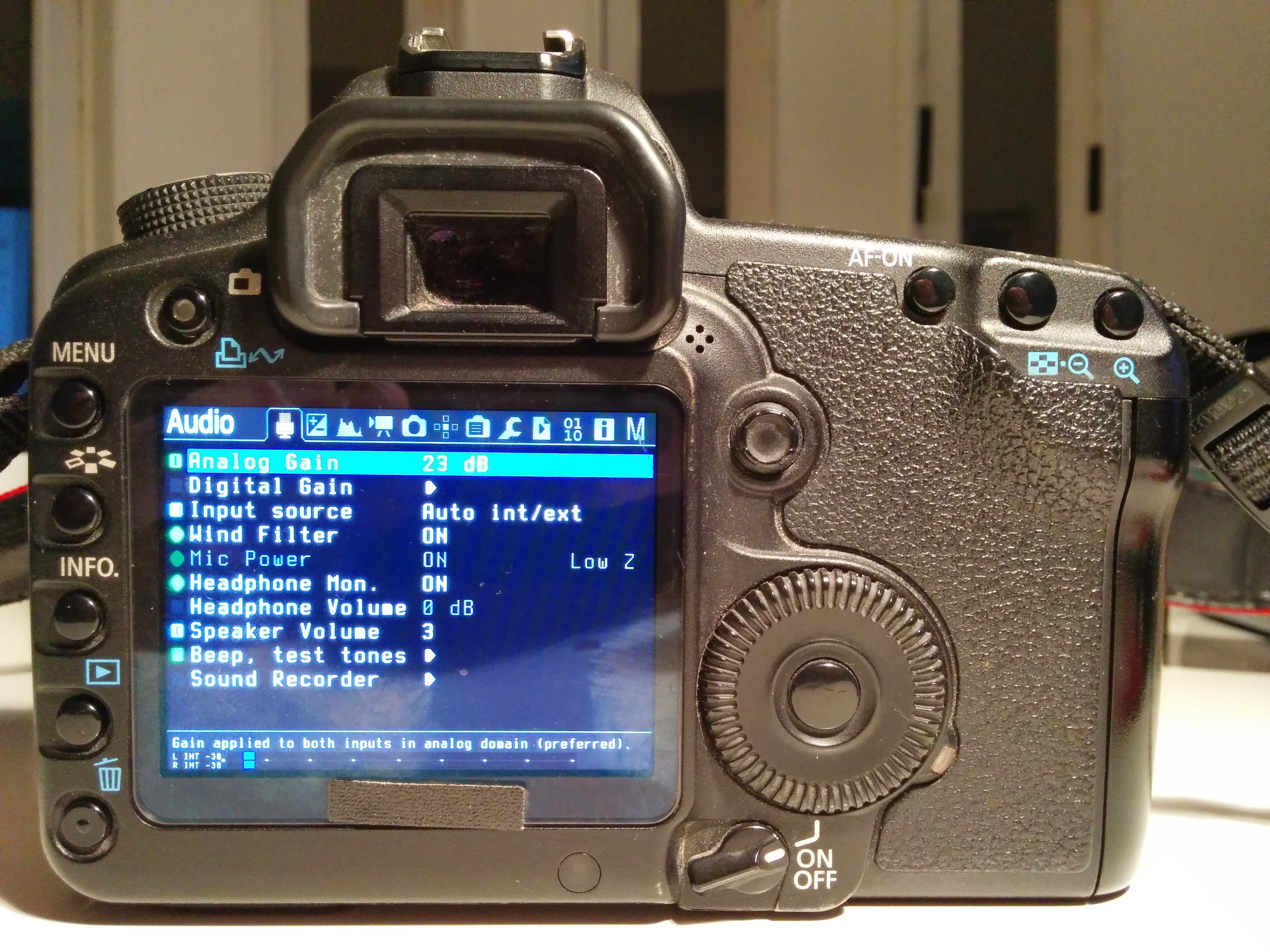
Audio menu on the Canon 5D Mark II

== Original Canon warranty ==
Because installing Magic Lantern does not replace the stock Canon firmware or modify the ROM but rather runs alongside it, it is both easy to remove and carries little risk. Canon has not made any official statements regarding the add-on firmware, either on the subject of warranty or on the features. In response to emails Canon has stated that while their warranty doesn't cover damage caused by third party firmware, it will cover unrelated issues such as malfunctioning buttons even if third party firmware has been installed.

== See also ==
- AXIOM (camera)

Type	Sensor	Class	00	01	02	03	04	05	06	07	08	09	10	11	12	13	14	15	16	17	18	19	20	21	22	23	24	25	26
DSLR	Full-frame	Flagship				1Ds		1Ds Mk II			1Ds Mk III					1D C													
DSLR	Full-frame	Flagship				1Ds		1Ds Mk II			1Ds Mk III				1D X					1D X Mk II ^{T}			1D X Mk III ^{T}						
DSLR	APS-H	Flagship			1D			1D Mk II	1D Mk II N		1D Mk III		1D Mk IV																
DSLR	Full-frame	Professional																	5DS / 5DS R										
DSLR	Full-frame	Professional							5D			_{x} 5D Mk II			_{x} 5D Mk III					5D Mk IV ^{T}									
DSLR	Full-frame	Advanced														_{x} 6D					_{x} 6D Mk II ^{AT}								
DSLR	APS-C	Advanced											_{x} 7D					_{x} 7D Mk II											
DSLR	APS-C	Mid-range						20Da								_{x} 60Da ^{A}													
DSLR	APS-C	Mid-range		D30	D60	10D		20D	30D		40D	_{x} 50D		_{x} 60D ^{A}			_{x} 70D ^{AT}		80D ^{AT}				90D ^{AT}						
DSLR	APS-C	Mid-range																	760D ^{AT}		77D ^{AT}								
DSLR	APS-C	Entry-level					300D	350D		400D	450D	_{x} 500D	_{x} 550D	_{x} 600D ^{A}		_{x} 650D ^{AT}	_{x} 700D ^{AT}		_{x} 750D ^{AT}		800D ^{AT}			850D ^{AT}					
DSLR	APS-C	Entry-level															_{x} 100D ^{T}		_{x} 200D ^{AT}				250D ^{AT}						
DSLR	APS-C	Entry-level										1000D		_{x} 1100D			_{x} 1200D			1300D		2000D							
DSLR	APS-C	Value																				4000D							
Early models			Canon EOS DCS 5 (1995); Canon EOS DCS 3 (1995); Canon EOS DCS 1 (1995); Canon EOS D2000 (1998); Canon EOS D6000 (1998)																										
Type	Sensor	Spec																											
Type	Sensor	Spec	00	01	02	03	04	05	06	07	08	09	10	11	12	13	14	15	16	17	18	19	20	21	22	23	24	25	26
