= T2I =

T2I may refer to:

- Take-Two Interactive, American video game publisher
- Text-to-image model, type of machine learning model
- Canon EOS 550D, known as EOS Rebel T2i in North America
