= Canon EOS 500D =

2009 APS-C digital single-lens reflex camera

Canon EOS 500D Canon EOS Rebel T1i Canon EOS Kiss X3
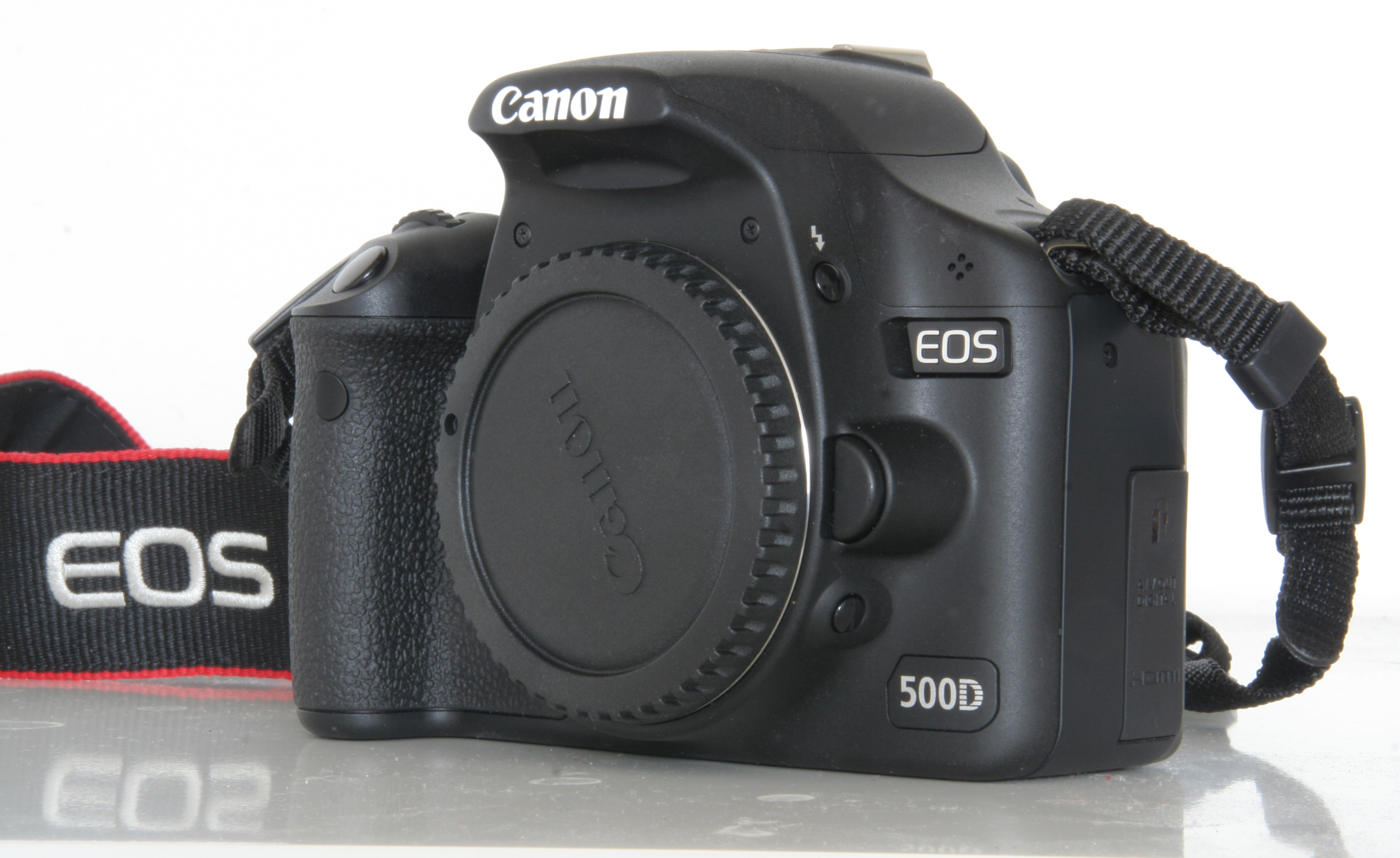

Overview
- Maker: Canon Inc.
- Type: Digital single-lens reflex
- Released: April 2009; 16 years ago

Lens
- Lens mount: Canon EF-S
- Lens: Interchangeable

Sensor/medium
- Sensor type: CMOS
- Sensor size: APS-C (22.3×14.9 mm)
- Maximum resolution: 15.1 effective megapixels, 4,752 x 3,168
- Film speed: ISO 100 to 3200 (expandable to 12800)
- Storage media: SD/SDHC

Focusing
- Focus modes: AI Focus, One-Shot, AI Servo, Live View
- Focus areas: 9 AF points

Exposure/metering
- Exposure modes: Full Auto, Portrait, Landscape, Close-up, Sports, Night Portrait, No Flash, Program AE, Shutter-priority, Aperture-priority, Manual, Auto Depth-of-field
- Exposure metering: Full aperture TTL, 35-zone SPC
- Metering modes: Spot, Evaluative, Partial (approx. 9% at center of viewfinder), Center-weighted average

Flash
- Flash: E-TTL II automatic built-in pop-up
- Flash synchronization: 1/200 s
- Flash bracketing: Yes

Shutter
- Shutter: Electronically-controlled focal-plane
- Shutter speed range: 1/4000 to 30 sec and Bulb
- Continuous shooting: 3.4 frame/s for 170 JPEGs or 9 raw files

Viewfinder
- Viewfinder: Fixed eye-level pentamirror
- Viewfinder magnification: 0.87×
- Frame coverage: 90%

Image processing
- White balance: Auto, Daylight, Shade, Cloudy, Tungsten Light, White Fluorescent Light, Flash, Manual, user-set
- WB bracketing: +/- 3 stops in 1-stop increments;

General
- LCD screen: 3 in (7.6 cm) color TFT LCD, 920,000 dots
- Battery: LP-E5 Lithium-Ion rechargeable battery (7.4 V, 1080 mAh)
- Optional battery packs: BG-E5 grip
- Dimensions: 129×98×62 mm (5.1×3.9×2.4 in)
- Weight: 480 g (17 oz) (body only)
- Made in: Japan, Taiwan

Chronology
- Predecessor: Canon EOS 450D
- Successor: Canon EOS 550D

The Canon EOS 500D is a 15-megapixel entry-level digital single-lens reflex camera, announced by Canon on 25 March 2009. It was released in April 2009. It is known as the EOS Kiss X3 in Japan, and as the EOS Rebel T1i in North America. It continues the Rebel line of mid-range DSLR cameras, is placed by Canon as the next model up from the EOS 450D, and has been superseded by the EOS 550D (T2i).

It is the third digital single-lens reflex camera to feature a movie mode and the second to feature full 1080p video recording, albeit at the rate of 20 frames/sec. The camera shares a few features with the high-end Canon EOS 5D Mark II, including movie mode, Live preview, and DiGIC 4. Like the EOS 450D and EOS 1000D, it uses SDHC media storage, and is the third EOS model to use that medium instead of CompactFlash. Like the EOS 5D Mark II, video clips are recorded as MOV (QuickTime) files with H.264/MPEG-4 compressed video and linear PCM audio.

== Features ==
- 15.1-megapixel CMOS sensor Type APS-C, 22.3 mm × 14.9 mm CMOS
- Type – TTL-CT-SIR with a CMOS sensor
- DIGIC 4 image processor
- 14-bit analog to digital signal conversion
- 3.0-inch (76 mm) LCD monitor (non-touchscreen)
- Live view mode and built-in flash
- Wide, selectable, nine-point AF with centre cross-type sensors
- Four metering modes, using 35-zones: spot, partial, center-weighted average, and evaluative metering.
- Auto lighting optimizer
- Highlight tone priority
- EOS integrated cleaning system
- sRGB and AdobeRGB colour spaces
- ISO 100–12,800
- ISO Sensitivity (8) – AUTO (100–1600), 100, 200, 400, 800, 1600, 3200; expandable to 6400 + H (approx. 12800) in 1-stop increments
- Continuous drive up to 3.4 frame/s (170 images (JPEG), 9 images (raw))
- Canon EF and EF-S lenses
- Support for PAL and NTSC video output
- SD and SDHC memory card file storage
- Raw and large JPEG simultaneous recording
- USB 2.0 and HDMI interfaces.
- LP-E5 battery
- Approximate weight 0.475 kg (1.05 lbs)
- Metering Range – EV 1–20 (at 23 °C with 50 mm f/1.4 lens ISO100)
- Low-Pass Filter – Built-in (fixed) with self-cleaning sensor unit
- AWB, Daylight, Shade, Cloudy, Tungsten, White, Fluorescent light, Flash, Custom. White balance compensation: Blue–Amber ±9, Magenta–Green ±9
- WB Bracketing – ±3 levels in single level increments, 3 bracketed images per shutter release. Selectable Blue/Amber bias or Magenta/ Green bias
- Viewfinder Information – AF information: AF points, focus confirmation light.
- Exposure information: Shutter speed, aperture value, ISO speed (always displayed), AE lock, exposure level/compensation, spot metering circle, exposure warning, AEB.
- Flash information: Flash ready, high-speed sync, FE lock, flash exposure compensation, red-eye reduction light. Image information: White balance correction, SD card information, monochrome shooting, maximum burst (1 digit display), Highlight tone priority (D+)

== Alternative firmware ==
Though not endorsed by Canon, the firmware of the camera allows for the installation of third-party custom firmware, altering the features of the camera. One example of such firmware is Magic Lantern.

== Reception ==
The Canon EOS 500D received favorable reviews on its release.

IT Reviews gave the camera a Recommended Award, and concluded: "Canon's DSLR range continues to go from strength to strength with this considerably enhanced upgrade of the EOS 450D, which manages to keep almost all of the previous physical features while improving the processor and the ISO range and adding a new Full HD video facility".

Digital Photography Review said: "For anybody buying their first DSLR the 500D is an easy recommendation but you might want to have a look at the Nikon D5000 as well. It comes with a similar feature set to the 500D ('only' 720P video though) and performs slightly better in low light".

== Alternatives and comparisons ==
Alternative cameras to the Canon EOS 500D:

- Sony Alpha 380 Digital SLR Camera
- Sony Alpha 35 Digital SLT Camera
- Olympus E-420 Digital SLR Camera
- Nikon D90 12.3 MP Digital SLR Camera
- Panasonic Lumix DMC-GF1 Micro Four-Thirds Camera
- Pentax K-x Digital SLR Camera

Next level upgrade cameras from the Canon EOS 500D:

- Canon EOS Rebel T2i (550D) Digital SLR Camera
- Panasonic DMC-GH1 Digital SLR Camera

Economical alternatives to the Canon EOS 500D:

- Canon Rebel XSi (450D) Digital SLR Camera
- Nikon D5000 Digital SLR Camera

== Sources ==
- Canon EOS Rebel T1i (500D) Digital SLR Kit w/EF-S 18-55mm f/3.5-5.6 IS Lens & Canon EF-S 55-250mm f/4-5.6 IS Autofocus Lens Reviews

Type	Sensor	Class	00	01	02	03	04	05	06	07	08	09	10	11	12	13	14	15	16	17	18	19	20	21	22	23	24	25
DSLR	Full-frame	Flagship				1Ds		1Ds Mk II			1Ds Mk III					1D C												
DSLR	Full-frame	Flagship				1Ds		1Ds Mk II			1Ds Mk III				1D X					1D X Mk II ^{T}			1D X Mk III ^{T}					
DSLR	APS-H	Flagship			1D			1D Mk II	1D Mk II N		1D Mk III		1D Mk IV															
DSLR	Full-frame	Professional																	5DS / 5DS R									
DSLR	Full-frame	Professional							5D			_{x} 5D Mk II			_{x} 5D Mk III					5D Mk IV ^{T}								
DSLR	Full-frame	Advanced														_{x} 6D					_{x} 6D Mk II ^{AT}							
DSLR	APS-C	Advanced											_{x} 7D					_{x} 7D Mk II										
DSLR	APS-C	Mid-range						20Da								_{x} 60Da ^{A}												
DSLR	APS-C	Mid-range		D30	D60	10D		20D	30D		40D	_{x} 50D		_{x} 60D ^{A}		_{x} 70D ^{AT}		80D ^{AT}					90D ^{AT}					
DSLR	APS-C	Mid-range																	760D ^{AT}		77D ^{AT}							
DSLR	APS-C	Entry-level					300D	350D		400D	450D	_{x} 500D	_{x} 550D	_{x} 600D ^{A}		_{x} 650D ^{AT}	_{x} 700D ^{AT}		_{x} 750D ^{AT}		800D ^{AT}			850D ^{AT}				
DSLR	APS-C	Entry-level															_{x} 100D ^{T}		_{x} 200D ^{AT}				250D ^{AT}					
DSLR	APS-C	Entry-level										1000D		_{x} 1100D			_{x} 1200D			1300D		2000D						
DSLR	APS-C	Value																				4000D						
Early models			Canon EOS DCS 5 (1995); Canon EOS DCS 3 (1995); Canon EOS DCS 1 (1995); Canon EOS D2000 (1998); Canon EOS D6000 (1998)																									
Type	Sensor	Spec																										
Type	Sensor	Spec	00	01	02	03	04	05	06	07	08	09	10	11	12	13	14	15	16	17	18	19	20	21	22	23	24	25
