= Canon EOS 550D =

2010 APS-C digital single-lens reflex camera

Canon EOS 550D Canon EOS Rebel T2i Canon EOS Kiss X4
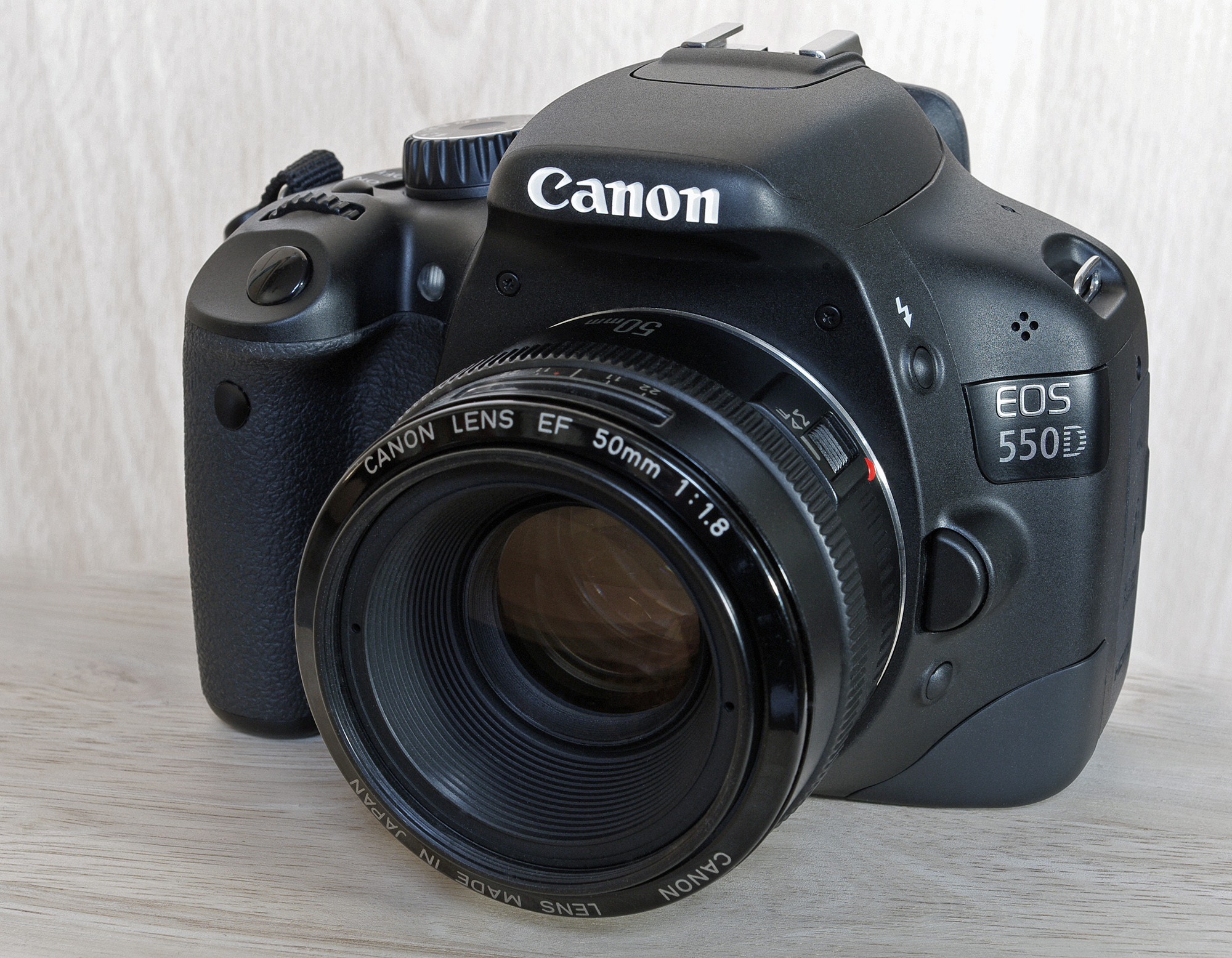

Overview
- Maker: Canon Inc.
- Type: Digital single-lens reflex

Lens
- Lens mount: Canon EF
- Lens: Canon EF lens mount, Canon EF-S lens mount

Sensor/medium
- Sensor: CMOS APS-C 22.3 × 14.9 mm (1.6x conversion factor)
- Maximum resolution: 5,184 × 3,456 pixels (18.0 megapixels)
- Film speed: ISO 100 to 6400 (expandable to 12800 with Canon Firmware, expandable to 24000 with Magic Lantern firmware)
- Storage media: Secure Digital Card; Secure Digital High Capacity; Secure Digital Extended Capacity

Focusing
- Focus modes: AI Focus, One-Shot, AI Servo, Live View
- Focus areas: 9 AF points, f/5.6 cross-type center (extra sensitivity at f/2.8)

Exposure/metering
- Exposure modes: Full Auto, Portrait, Landscape, Close-up, Sports, Night Portrait, No Flash, Program AE, Shutter-priority, Aperture-priority, Manual, Auto Depth-of-field, Movie
- Exposure metering: Full aperture TTL, 63-zone SPC
- Metering modes: Evaluative, Spot (4% at center), Partial (9% at center), Center-weighted average

Flash
- Flash: E-TTL II automatic built-in pop-up
- Flash bracketing: No

Shutter
- Shutter: focal-plane
- Shutter speed range: 1/4000 to 30 sec and bulb, 1/200 s X-sync
- Continuous shooting: 3.7 frame/s for 34 JPEG or 6 raw frames

Viewfinder
- Viewfinder: Eye-level pentamirror SLR, 95% coverage, 0.87× magnification, and electronic (Live View)

Image processing
- Image processor: DIGIC 4
- White balance: Auto, Daylight, Shade, Cloudy, Tungsten, Fluorescent, Flash, Custom
- WB bracketing: ± 5 stops for 3 frames

General
- LCD screen: 3 in 3:2 color TFT LCD, 1,040,000 dots
- Battery: LP-E8 Lithium-Ion rechargeable battery
- Optional battery packs: BG-E8 grip
- Dimensions: 129×98×62 mm (5.1×3.9×2.4 in)
- Weight: 530 g (19 oz) (including battery and card)
- Made in: Japan

Chronology
- Predecessor: Canon EOS 500D
- Successor: Canon EOS 600D

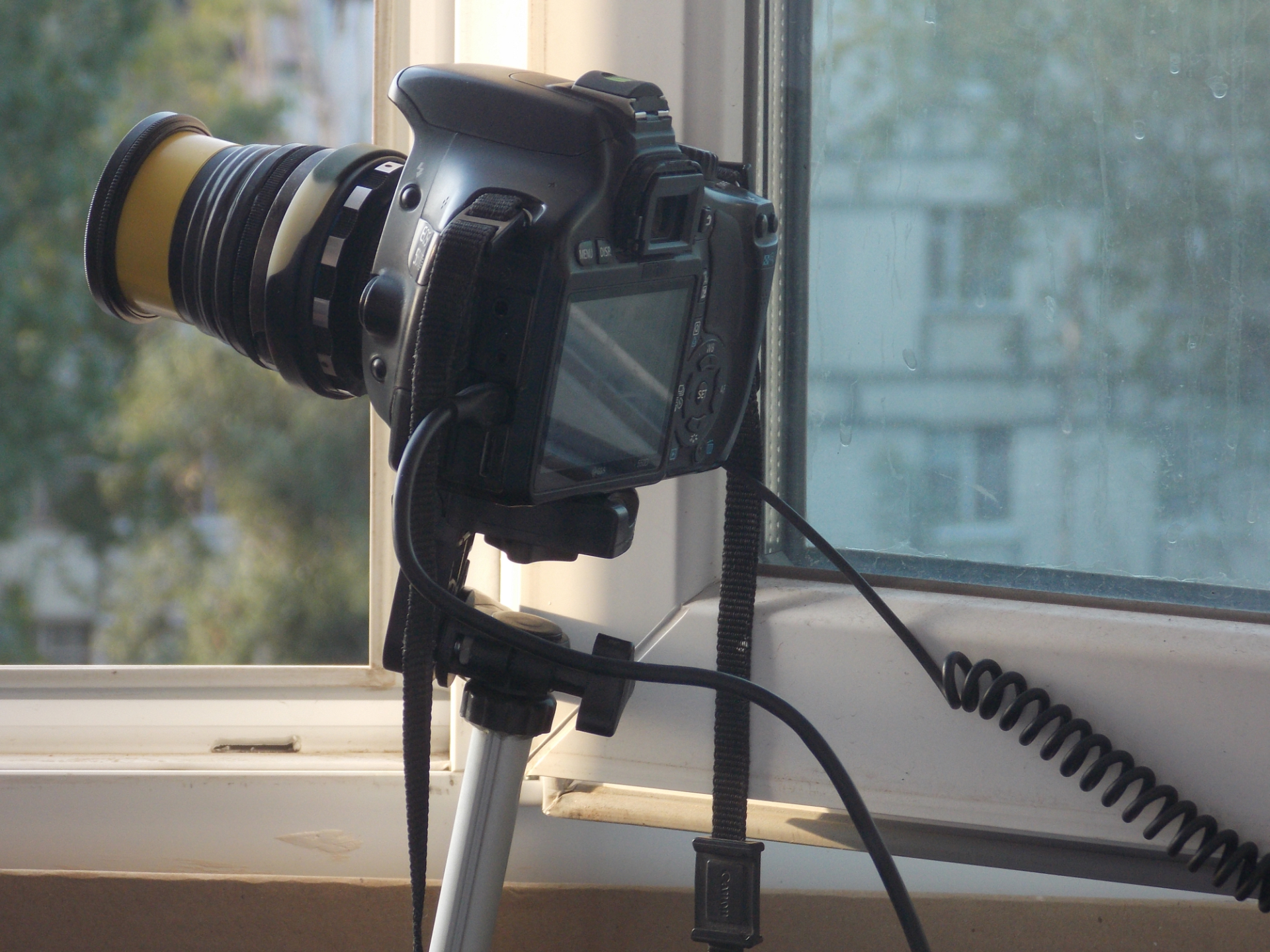

The Canon EOS 550D is an 18.0-megapixel digital single-lens reflex camera, announced by Canon on 8 February 2010. It was available since 24 February 2010, and to US dealers from early March. It is known as the EOS Kiss X4 in Japan, and as the EOS Rebel T2i in the Americas. It is part of Canon's entry/mid-level digital SLR camera series, and was the successor model to the EOS 500D. It was succeeded by the EOS 600D (Kiss X5 / Rebel T3i) but remained in Canon's lineup until being discontinued in June 2012 with the announcement of the EOS 650D (Kiss X6i / Rebel T4i).

== Features ==
- 18.0 effective megapixel CMOS sensor
- 1080p HD video recording at 24p (23.976 fps), 25p (25 fps), and 30p (29.97 fps) with drop-frame timing
- 720p HD video recording at 50 fps (50 Hz) and 60 fps (59.94 Hz)
- 480p video recording at 50 fps (50 Hz) and 60 fps (59.94 Hz)
- 3.5mm microphone jack for external microphones or recorders.
- PAL / NTSC video output
- DIGIC 4 image processor
- 14-bit analog to digital signal conversion
- 3.0-inch (76 mm) 3:2 aspect ratio LCD monitor
- Live view mode
- Built-in flash
- Wide, selectable, nine-point AF with centre cross-type sensor extra sensitive at f/2.8
- Four metering modes, using 63-zones: spot, partial, center-weighted average, and evaluative metering
- Highlight tone priority
- EOS integrated cleaning system
- Internal monaural microphone
- sRGB and Adobe RGB colour spaces
- ISO 100–6,400 expandable to 12,800
- Continuous drive up to 3.7 frame/s (34 images (JPEG), 6 images (raw))
- SD, SDHC, and SDXC memory card file storage
- Raw and large JPEG simultaneous recording
- USB 2.0, HDMI control (CEC)
- LP-E8 battery
- Approximate weight 0.53 kg (1.2 lb) with battery and card

== Bundled software ==
The 550D comes with following image-processing and camera-operating software:

- ZoomBrowser EX / ImageBrowser Image Processing
- Digital Photo Professional
- PhotoStitch
- EOS Utility
- Picture Style Editor

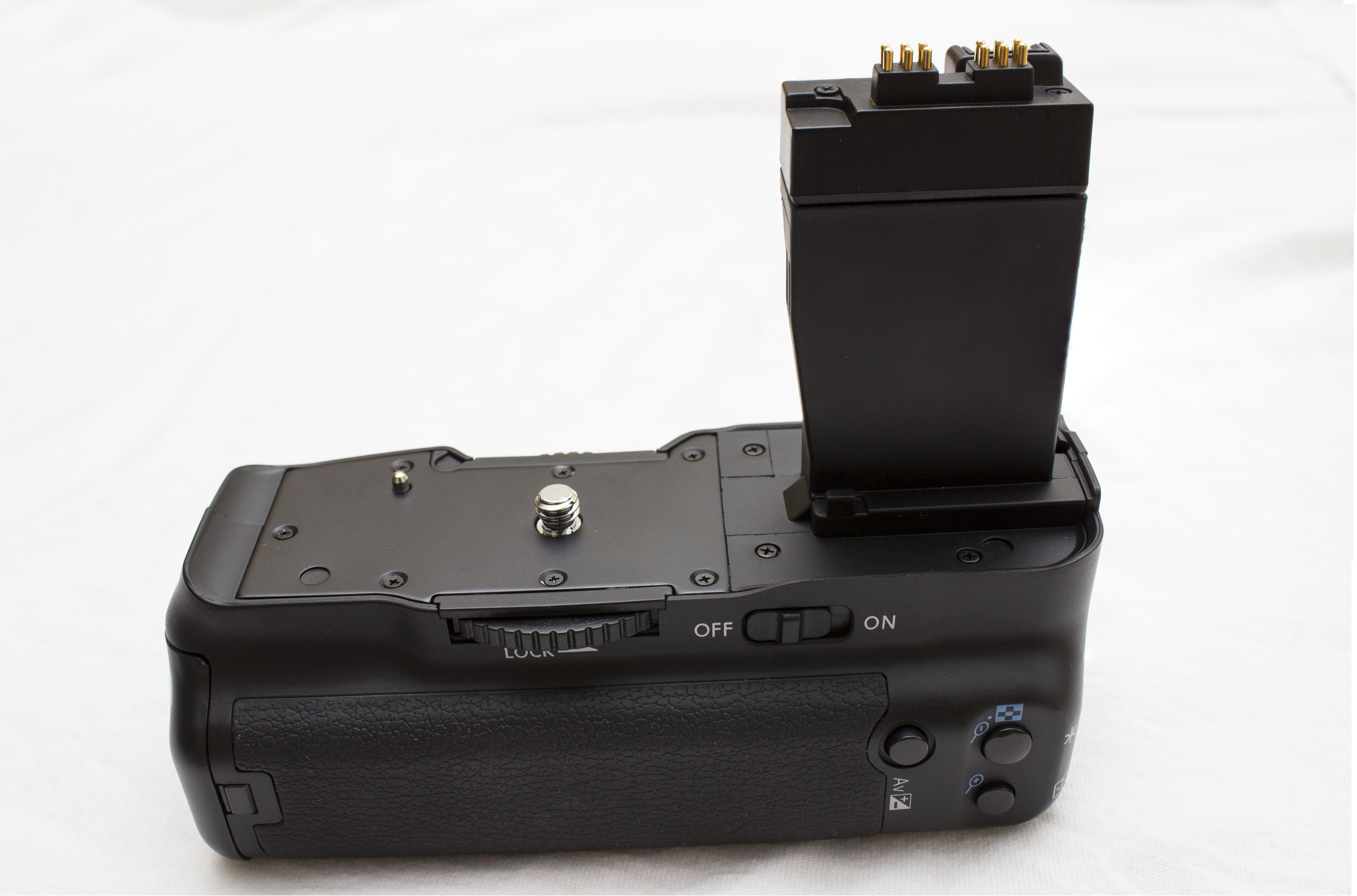
Neewer battery grip for T2i, T3i, T4i and T5i

== Optional accessories ==
The Canon EOS 550D has available accessories, such as:

- All EF and EF-S lenses
- Macro Ring Lite MR-14EX
- Macro twin lite MT-24EX
- E-series Dioptic Adjustment Lenses
- Angle Finder C
- Semi hard case EH19L
- Interface Cable IFC-200U/500U
- Original Data Security Kit OSK-E3
- Canon EX-series Speedlites & ST-E2
- AC Adapter Kit (AC Adapter CA-PS700 & DC Coupler – DR-E8)
- Battery grip BG-E8
- Battery Magazine BGME8A/L
- Eyepiece Extender EPEX15II
- HDMI Cable HTC-100
- Remote Switch RS-60E3
- Wireless Remote Controller RC-6

== Firmware updates ==
In July 2010, Canon released firmware 1.0.8 that fixed a phenomenon in which the set aperture moves unexpectedly when shooting movies in manual exposure mode using some Canon lenses (such as macro lenses). On 25 December 2010, Canon offered firmware version 1.0.9 which fixed tone jumps in some images, depending on the shooting scene and when shooting with the Auto Lighting Optimizer settings (low / standard / strong).

== Custom firmware ==
Magic Lantern is an open-source (GPL) firmware add-on for Canon DSLR cameras, which has enhancements for video and still photography without replacing the stock firmware. The Canon T2i is compatible with Magic Lantern firmware.

== Reception ==
The British Journal of Photography was impressed by the 550D and said "the EOS 550D is a good match for the 7D at half the price". On Digital Photography Review, it got overall score of 77%. For most of its product life, alternative cameras included the Nikon D5000, Nikon D3100, Canon 500D, Nikon D90, and Pentax K-7. Immediately before it was discontinued in 2012, the main competitors of the 550D were the Nikon D3200 and D5100 (respectively the replacements for the D3100 and D5000), Pentax K-r (replacement for the K-x), and the Sony Alpha 57, one of the company's SLT cameras. (The replacement for the Nikon D90, the D7000, is positioned upmarket from the 550D.)

== See also ==
- Canon EF lens mount

Type	Sensor	Class	00	01	02	03	04	05	06	07	08	09	10	11	12	13	14	15	16	17	18	19	20	21	22	23	24	25	26
DSLR	Full-frame	Flagship				1Ds		1Ds Mk II			1Ds Mk III					1D C													
DSLR	Full-frame	Flagship				1Ds		1Ds Mk II			1Ds Mk III				1D X					1D X Mk II ^{T}			1D X Mk III ^{T}						
DSLR	APS-H	Flagship			1D			1D Mk II	1D Mk II N		1D Mk III		1D Mk IV																
DSLR	Full-frame	Professional																	5DS / 5DS R										
DSLR	Full-frame	Professional							5D			_{x} 5D Mk II			_{x} 5D Mk III					5D Mk IV ^{T}									
DSLR	Full-frame	Advanced														_{x} 6D					_{x} 6D Mk II ^{AT}								
DSLR	APS-C	Advanced											_{x} 7D					_{x} 7D Mk II											
DSLR	APS-C	Mid-range						20Da								_{x} 60Da ^{A}													
DSLR	APS-C	Mid-range		D30	D60	10D		20D	30D		40D	_{x} 50D		_{x} 60D ^{A}			_{x} 70D ^{AT}		80D ^{AT}				90D ^{AT}						
DSLR	APS-C	Mid-range																	760D ^{AT}		77D ^{AT}								
DSLR	APS-C	Entry-level					300D	350D		400D	450D	_{x} 500D	_{x} 550D	_{x} 600D ^{A}		_{x} 650D ^{AT}	_{x} 700D ^{AT}		_{x} 750D ^{AT}		800D ^{AT}			850D ^{AT}					
DSLR	APS-C	Entry-level															_{x} 100D ^{T}		_{x} 200D ^{AT}				250D ^{AT}						
DSLR	APS-C	Entry-level										1000D		_{x} 1100D			_{x} 1200D			1300D		2000D							
DSLR	APS-C	Value																				4000D							
Early models			Canon EOS DCS 5 (1995); Canon EOS DCS 3 (1995); Canon EOS DCS 1 (1995); Canon EOS D2000 (1998); Canon EOS D6000 (1998)																										
Type	Sensor	Spec																											
Type	Sensor	Spec	00	01	02	03	04	05	06	07	08	09	10	11	12	13	14	15	16	17	18	19	20	21	22	23	24	25	26
