= Canon EOS 600D =

2011 APS-C digital single-lens reflex camera

Canon EOS 600D Canon EOS Rebel T3i Canon EOS Kiss X5
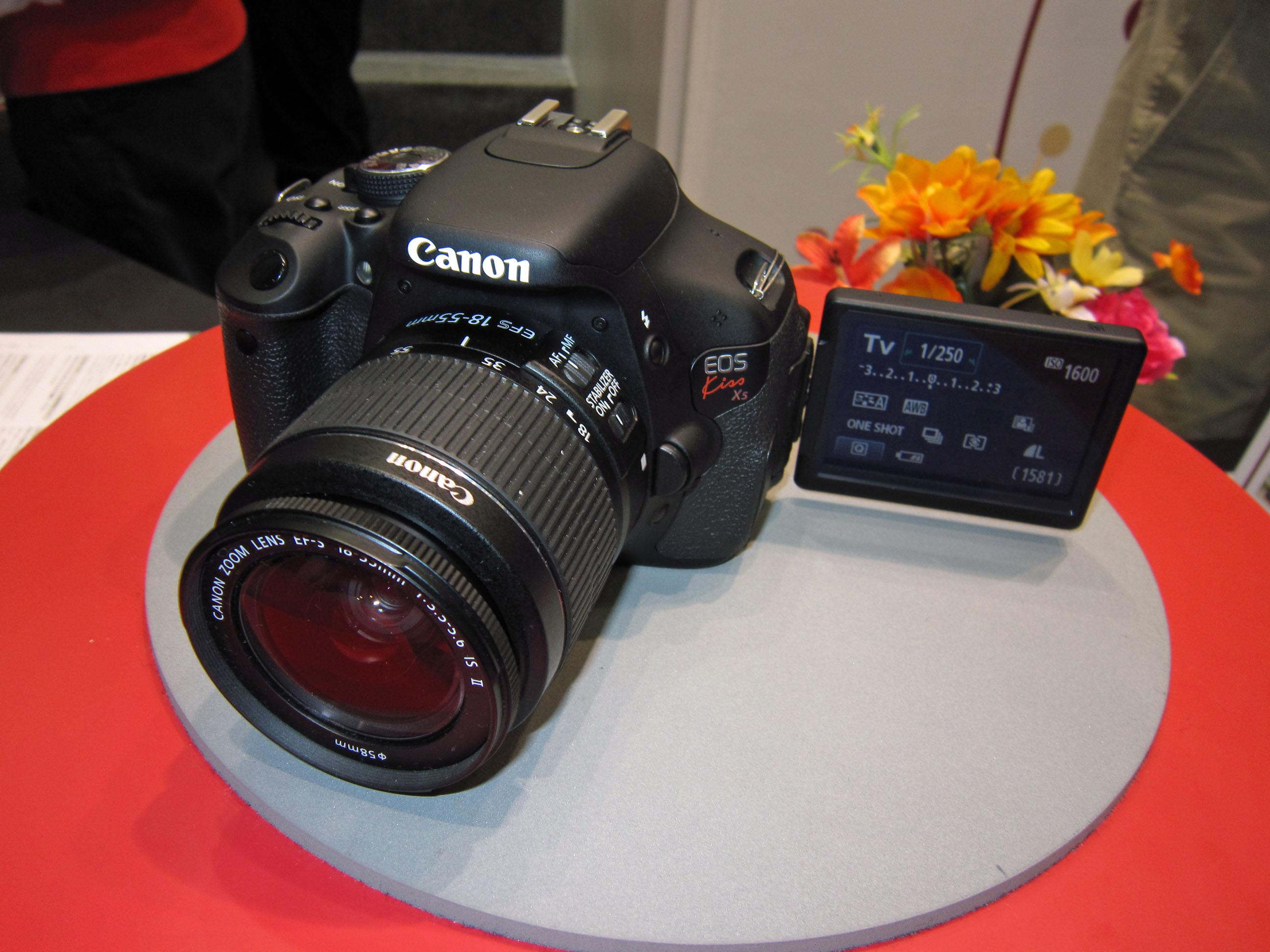

Overview
- Maker: Canon Inc.
- Type: Digital single-lens reflex

Lens
- Lens mount: Canon EF-S
- Lens: Interchangeable

Sensor/medium
- Sensor type: CMOS
- Sensor size: APS-C (22.3 × 14.9 mm)
- Maximum resolution: 5,184×3,456 (18.0 effective megapixels)
- Film speed: ISO 100 – 6400 (expandable to 12800)
- Storage media: SD/SDHC/SDXC

Focusing
- Focus modes: AI Focus, One-Shot, AI Servo, Live View
- Focus areas: 9 AF points, (f/5.6 cross type at centre, extra sensitivity at f/2.8)

Exposure/metering
- Exposure modes: Scene Intelligent Mode (or Full Auto), Portrait, Landscape (Daylight, Shade, Cloudy, Sunset, Default setting), Close-up, Sports, Night Portrait, No Flash, Program AE, Shutter-priority, Aperture-priority, Manual, Auto Depth-of-field, Movie
- Exposure metering: Full aperture TTL, 63-zone SPC
- Metering modes: Evaluative, Spot (4% at center), Partial (9% at center), Center-weighted average

Flash
- Flash: E-TTL II automatic built-in pop-up
- Flash bracketing: Yes

Shutter
- Shutter: focal-plane
- Shutter speed range: 1/4000 to 30 sec and bulb, 1/200 s X-sync
- Continuous shooting: 3.7 frame/s for 34 JPEG or 6 raw frames

Viewfinder
- Viewfinder: Fixed eye-level pentamirror
- Viewfinder magnification: 0.85×
- Frame coverage: 95%

Image processing
- Image processor: DIGIC 4
- White balance: Auto, Daylight, Shade, Cloudy, Tungsten, Fluorescent, Flash, Custom
- WB bracketing: +/- 3 stops for 3 frames

General
- LCD screen: 3 in 3:2 color TFT LCD, 1,040,000 dots, articulated, live preview
- Battery: LP-E8 Lithium-Ion rechargeable battery 7.2v 1120mAh (8.1Wh)
- Optional battery packs: BG-E8 grip
- Dimensions: 133.1×99.5×79.7 mm (5.24×3.92×3.14 in)
- Weight: 560 g (20 oz) (including battery and card)
- Made in: Taiwan/Japan

Chronology
- Predecessor: Canon EOS 550D
- Successor: Canon EOS 650D

The Canon EOS 600D is an 18.0 megapixel digital single-lens reflex camera, released by Canon on 7 February 2011. It is known as the EOS Kiss X5 in Japan and the EOS Rebel T3i in America. The 600D is the second Canon EOS camera with an articulating LCD screen and supersedes the 550D, although the earlier model was not discontinued until June 2012, when the successor of the 600D, the 650D, was announced.

== Feature list ==
- 18.0 effective megapixel APS-C CMOS sensor
- Full HD 1080p video recording at 24/25/30 frame/s
- HD 720p video recording at 50/60 frame/s
- 3–10× Digital Zoom in video recording (available only in 1080p).
  - One reviewer concluded that this feature takes a 1920×1080 crop from the middle of the sensor frame for the "3×" zoom, but was unable to confirm this with Canon. This feature has not been included in any subsequent models of the Rebel line, or in the EOS M mirrorless camera (although in that model, it can be implemented with Magic Lantern open source software), but returned with the 2013 release of the EOS 70D.
- DIGIC 4 image processor
- 14-bit analog to digital signal conversion
- 3.0-inch (76 mm) Vari-angle 3:2 aspect ratio LCD articulating screen.
  - The screen, inherited from the mid-range 60D, is also notable in that its aspect ratio matches that of the sensor—a rare feature among DSLRs at the time of introduction.
- Live view mode
- Built in flash with Speedlite wireless multi-flash support
- 9-point AF with centre cross-type sensor sensitive at f/2.8
- Four metering modes, using 63 zones: spot, partial, center-weighted average, and evaluative metering.
- Highlight tone priority
- EOS integrated cleaning system
- sRGB and Adobe RGB colour spaces
- ISO 100–6,400 expandable to 12,800
- Continuous drive up to 3.7 frame/s (34 images (JPEG), 6 images (raw))
- SD, SDHC, and SDXC memory card file storage
- RAW and large JPEG simultaneous recording
- Eye-Fi support
- USB 2.0, HDMI interface
- LP-E8 battery

== Video ==
As with many DSLRs (and unlike the SLT cameras), the 600D lacks continuous auto-focus while filming video. To keep a moving subject in focus the user must either trigger the auto-focus (as when shooting stills), or track the subject's motion manually.

== Successor ==
The successor of Canon EOS 600D was the Canon EOS 650D, equipped with a newly developed Hybrid CMOS sensor that enabled full-time AF during video and live-view mode, and had a multi-touch vari-angle display for one-touch shooting. The DIGIC V image processor gave 5 fps of continuous shooting speed and enabled the capture of HDR images with just one click of the shutter button. The Canon 650D also came with a multi-frame NR mode and Handheld Night Scene mode. DPReview praised its innovative touchscreen, but also pointed out that with regard to auto-focussing in live view mode the 650D was "still far behind the better mirrorless models we have seen from the likes of Panasonic and Olympus as well as rival Nikon's 1 series".

== See also ==
- Canon EF lens mount
- Canon EF-S lens mount, a subset of the EF mount designed for cameras with APS-C sensors such as the 600D

Type	Sensor	Class	00	01	02	03	04	05	06	07	08	09	10	11	12	13	14	15	16	17	18	19	20	21	22	23	24	25
DSLR	Full-frame	Flagship				1Ds		1Ds Mk II			1Ds Mk III					1D C												
DSLR	Full-frame	Flagship				1Ds		1Ds Mk II			1Ds Mk III				1D X					1D X Mk II ^{T}			1D X Mk III ^{T}					
DSLR	APS-H	Flagship			1D			1D Mk II	1D Mk II N		1D Mk III		1D Mk IV															
DSLR	Full-frame	Professional																	5DS / 5DS R									
DSLR	Full-frame	Professional							5D			_{x} 5D Mk II			_{x} 5D Mk III					5D Mk IV ^{T}								
DSLR	Full-frame	Advanced														_{x} 6D					_{x} 6D Mk II ^{AT}							
DSLR	APS-C	Advanced											_{x} 7D					_{x} 7D Mk II										
DSLR	APS-C	Mid-range						20Da								_{x} 60Da ^{A}												
DSLR	APS-C	Mid-range		D30	D60	10D		20D	30D		40D	_{x} 50D		_{x} 60D ^{A}		_{x} 70D ^{AT}		80D ^{AT}					90D ^{AT}					
DSLR	APS-C	Mid-range																	760D ^{AT}		77D ^{AT}							
DSLR	APS-C	Entry-level					300D	350D		400D	450D	_{x} 500D	_{x} 550D	_{x} 600D ^{A}		_{x} 650D ^{AT}	_{x} 700D ^{AT}		_{x} 750D ^{AT}		800D ^{AT}			850D ^{AT}				
DSLR	APS-C	Entry-level															_{x} 100D ^{T}		_{x} 200D ^{AT}				250D ^{AT}					
DSLR	APS-C	Entry-level										1000D		_{x} 1100D			_{x} 1200D			1300D		2000D						
DSLR	APS-C	Value																				4000D						
Early models			Canon EOS DCS 5 (1995); Canon EOS DCS 3 (1995); Canon EOS DCS 1 (1995); Canon EOS D2000 (1998); Canon EOS D6000 (1998)																									
Type	Sensor	Spec																										
Type	Sensor	Spec	00	01	02	03	04	05	06	07	08	09	10	11	12	13	14	15	16	17	18	19	20	21	22	23	24	25
