= Canon EOS 700D =

2013 APS-C digital single-lens reflex camera

Canon EOS 700D Canon EOS Rebel T5i Canon EOS Kiss X7i
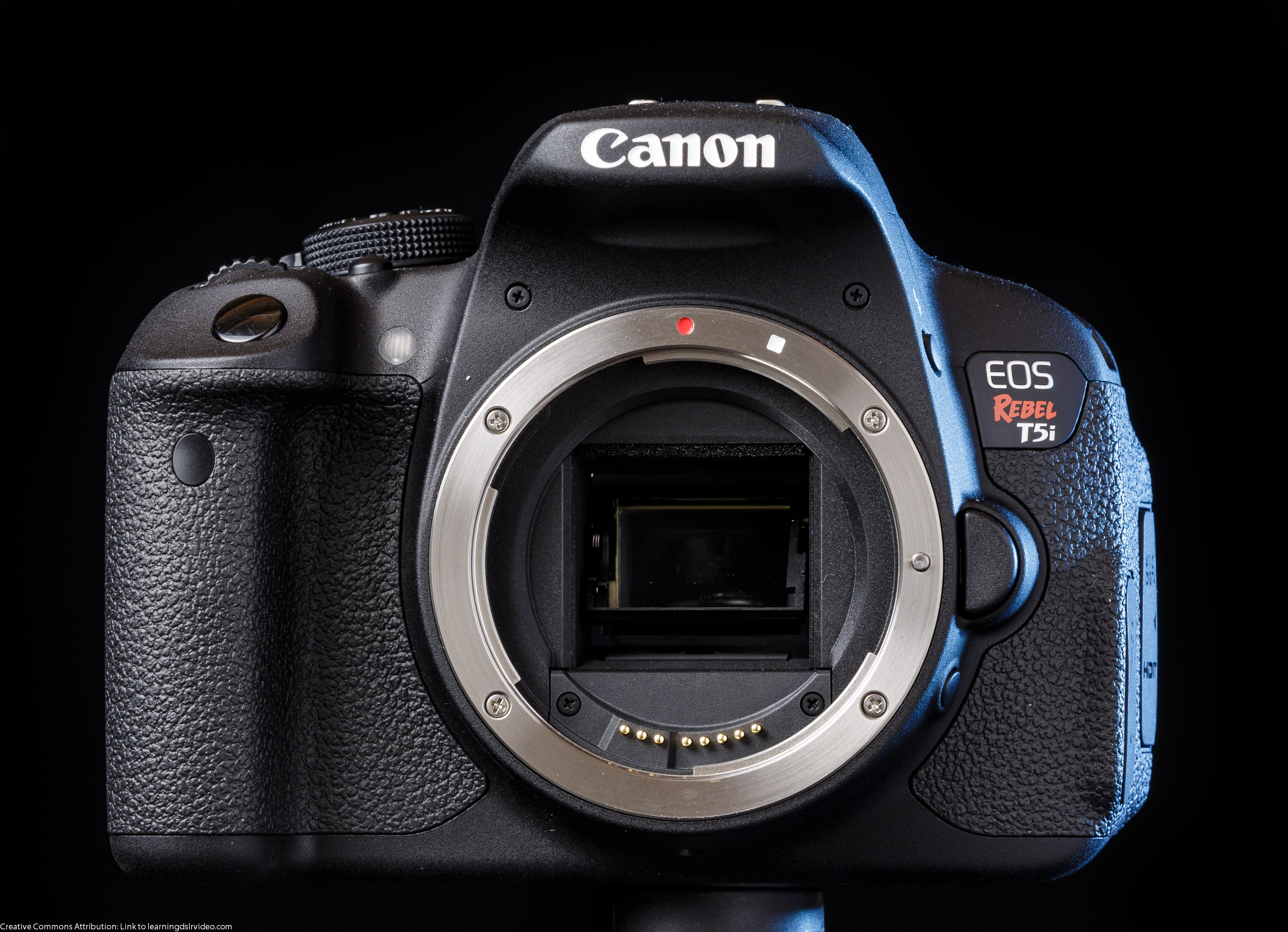
- The Canon EOS 700D/Rebel T5i/Kiss X7i body, as shown with no lens.

Overview
- Maker: Canon Inc.
- Type: Digital single-lens reflex camera

Lens
- Lens mount: Canon EF-S
- Lens: Interchangeable

Sensor/medium
- Sensor type: CMOS
- Sensor size: 22.3 × 14.9 mm (APS-C format)
- Maximum resolution: 5184 × 3456 (18.0 effective megapixels)
- Film speed: 100 – 12800 (expandable to H: 25600)
- Storage media: SD/SDHC/SDXC (UHS-I bus supported)

Focusing
- Focus modes: One-Shot, AI Focus, AI Servo, Live View (FlexiZone - Multi, FlexiZone - Single, Face Detection), Movie Servo
- Focus areas: 9 cross-type AF points

Exposure/metering
- Exposure modes: Scene Intelligent Auto, Flash Off, Creative Auto, Portrait, Landscape, Close-up, Sports, Special Scenes (Night Portrait, Handheld Night Scene, HDR Backlight Control), Program AE, Shutter priority AE, Aperture priority AE, Manual exposure, Movie
- Exposure metering: Full aperture TTL, 63 zones iFCL SPC
- Metering modes: Evaluative, Partial, Spot, Center-weighted average

Flash
- Flash: E-TTL II auto-pop-up built-in / External
- Flash bracketing: Yes

Shutter
- Shutter: Electronic focal-plane
- Shutter speed range: 1/4000 sec. - 30 sec. and Bulb; X-sync at 1/200 sec.
- Continuous shooting: 5.0 fps for 22 JPEG (30 with UHS-I cards) or for 6 RAW frames

Viewfinder
- Viewfinder: Eye-level pentamirror with 95% coverage and 0.85x magnification / LCD (Live View)

Image processing
- Image processor: DIGIC 5
- White balance: Auto, Daylight, Shade, Cloudy, Tungsten, White Fluorescent, Flash, Custom
- WB bracketing: +/- 3 stops for 3 frames

General
- LCD screen: 3.0" (7.7 cm) Clear View II colour TFT LCD touchscreen with 1,040,000 dots resolution
- Battery: LP-E8 Li-Ion rechargeable
- Optional battery packs: BG-E8 grip allows the use one LP-E8 battery or two LP-E8 batteries
- Dimensions: 133.1 mm × 99.5 mm × 78.8 mm (5.24 in × 3.92 in × 3.10 in)
- Weight: 525 g (18.5 oz) (body only)
- Made in: Taiwan / Japan

Chronology
- Predecessor: Canon EOS 650D
- Successor: Canon EOS 750D

The Canon EOS 700D, known as the Kiss X7i in Japan or as the Rebel T5i in the Americas, is an 18.0 megapixel digital single-lens reflex camera made by Canon. It was announced on March 21, 2013, with a suggested retail price of US$849. As a part of the Canon EOS three-digit/Rebel digital line, it is the successor to the EOS 650D/Kiss X6i/Rebel T4i and is the predecessor of both the EOS 750D/Kiss X8i/Rebel T6i and EOS 760D/EOS 8000D/Rebel T6s.

== Features ==
The 700D has a feature set almost identical to that of the older 650D. According to photographer and technology writer Gordon Laing,

It's fair to say that not a great deal has changed between the T5i / 700D and its predecessor. Indeed they're identical other than three changes: a new mode dial which can rotate through 360 degrees and keep turning, previews of Creative Filters in Live View, and a new external coating inherited from mid-range models like the 60D to provide a more durable finish.

The 700D, however, was introduced with a new kit lens — a new version of the existing EF-S 18–55mm that employs Canon's STM (stepping motor) technology. It also (for the first time in a Canon 18–55mm lens) has a front section that does not rotate.

Features include:

- 18.0 effective megapixel APS-C CMOS sensor (Hybrid CMOS sensor)
- 9 AF points, all cross-type at f/5.6. Center point is high precision, double cross-type at f/2.8 or faster
- DIGIC 5 image processor with 14-bit processing
- ISO 100 – 12800 sensitivity, extends to ISO 25600
- 95% viewfinder frame coverage with 0.85x magnification
- 1080p full HD video recording at 30fps, 25p (25 Hz) and 30p (29.97 Hz) with drop frame timing
- 720p HD video recording at 60p (59.94 Hz) and 50p (50 Hz)
- 480p ED video recording at 30p and 25p
- 5.0 frames per second continuous shooting
- 3.0-inch Vari-angle Clear View LCD II Touch screen with 1.04-megapixel resolution
- 3.5 mm microphone jack for external microphones or recorders

Differences compared to EOS 650D:

- Real-time preview of Creative Filters in Live View mode
- Redesigned new mode dial that can rotate 360 degrees
- New "upmarket" textured body finish

Type	Sensor	Class	00	01	02	03	04	05	06	07	08	09	10	11	12	13	14	15	16	17	18	19	20	21	22	23	24	25	26
DSLR	Full-frame	Flagship				1Ds		1Ds Mk II			1Ds Mk III					1D C													
DSLR	Full-frame	Flagship				1Ds		1Ds Mk II			1Ds Mk III				1D X					1D X Mk II ^{T}			1D X Mk III ^{T}						
DSLR	APS-H	Flagship			1D			1D Mk II	1D Mk II N		1D Mk III		1D Mk IV																
DSLR	Full-frame	Professional																	5DS / 5DS R										
DSLR	Full-frame	Professional							5D			_{x} 5D Mk II			_{x} 5D Mk III					5D Mk IV ^{T}									
DSLR	Full-frame	Advanced														_{x} 6D					_{x} 6D Mk II ^{AT}								
DSLR	APS-C	Advanced											_{x} 7D					_{x} 7D Mk II											
DSLR	APS-C	Mid-range						20Da								_{x} 60Da ^{A}													
DSLR	APS-C	Mid-range		D30	D60	10D		20D	30D		40D	_{x} 50D		_{x} 60D ^{A}			_{x} 70D ^{AT}		80D ^{AT}				90D ^{AT}						
DSLR	APS-C	Mid-range																	760D ^{AT}		77D ^{AT}								
DSLR	APS-C	Entry-level					300D	350D		400D	450D	_{x} 500D	_{x} 550D	_{x} 600D ^{A}		_{x} 650D ^{AT}	_{x} 700D ^{AT}		_{x} 750D ^{AT}		800D ^{AT}			850D ^{AT}					
DSLR	APS-C	Entry-level															_{x} 100D ^{T}		_{x} 200D ^{AT}				250D ^{AT}						
DSLR	APS-C	Entry-level										1000D		_{x} 1100D			_{x} 1200D			1300D		2000D							
DSLR	APS-C	Value																				4000D							
Early models			Canon EOS DCS 5 (1995); Canon EOS DCS 3 (1995); Canon EOS DCS 1 (1995); Canon EOS D2000 (1998); Canon EOS D6000 (1998)																										
Type	Sensor	Spec																											
Type	Sensor	Spec	00	01	02	03	04	05	06	07	08	09	10	11	12	13	14	15	16	17	18	19	20	21	22	23	24	25	26
