= Canon EOS flash system =

Camera flash system

Canon's EOS flash system refers to the photographic flash equipment and automation algorithms used on Canon's film (35mm and APS) or digital EOS single-lens reflex cameras. The line was first introduced in 1987. It has gone through a number of revisions over the years, as new flash exposure metering systems have been introduced. The main light-metering technologies are known as A-TTL, E-TTL, and E-TTL II.

The EOS flash system is capable of wireless multiple flash control, whereby a master flash unit IR (ST-E2) or RF (ST-E3-RT) transmitter mounted on the camera body can control up to 3 (optical) or 5 (radio) groups of flash units. The Canon EOS 7D is the first Canon body to be able to control Speedlites wirelessly without the use of a Master Speedlite or IR transmitter; four other EOS models, the 60D, 600D, 650D, 70D, and 700D, also have wireless flash capabilities. The 7D is capable of handling three slave groups. The other cameras can handle two slave groups.

== Metering systems ==
Canon has introduced several different metering systems for its flash products: A-TTL, E-TTL, and E-TTL II. Each system represents different approaches to achieving the proper flash exposure.

=== A-TTL ===
Advanced-Through The Lens (A-TTL) is a through-the-lens (TTL) metering system that was expanded to support flashes. A sensor inside the camera reads the amount of light being reflected off the film during the exposure. When the sensor determines that the exposure is sufficient, it terminates the flash pulse. A-TTL, first seen on the T90 (which predates the EOS family), is a flash exposure system that adds a brief preflash during exposure metering when the camera is in the programmed exposure (P) mode. The amount of light returned from this preflash is used to determine an appropriate tradeoff between aperture and shutter speed in P mode. Depending on the specific flash unit and whether or not it is set to bounce, the preflash might be infrared or it might be the normal white flash. In an A-TTL system the sensor that reads the preflash return is located on the flash unit; this caused some issues especially when using filters as the filter would cover the lens (but not the sensor outside the lens) thus causing inaccurate settings. Some early Canon EOS cameras also used the A-TTL preflash in non-programmed exposure modes to detect "out of range" conditions; the "out of range" warning feature was dropped on later models, reportedly due to patent conflicts.

=== E-TTL ===
Evaluative-Through The Lens (E-TTL) is a Canon EOS flash exposure system that uses a brief pre-flash before the main flash in order to obtain a more correct exposure. Unlike TTL and A-TTL metering, which use a dedicated flash metering sensor mounted in the base of the mirror box, E-TTL uses the same evaluative metering sensor used for ambient metering. Like TTL (and like the actual flash metering, but not the pre-flash, of A-TTL), the sensor is internal to the camera and takes its exposure via the lens so any filters added to the lens will also affect the E-TTL readings giving more accurate exposure information to the camera.

The pre-flash occurs immediately before the main flash (except when using the camera / flash in 2nd curtain sync mode) and is barely perceptible, although it can be seen if you watch carefully for it. The pre-flash may cause undesirable reactions from animate objects - e.g. humans may blink as a reaction to the pre-flash, and have their eyes closed by the time the main flash occurs. When using flash exposure lock (FEL), the pre-flash is fired when FEL is activated.

E-TTL has two major disadvantages over A-TTL when used with film cameras. One, since it takes its readings using the same sensor the camera uses for ambient metering, which is located above the prism in the viewfinder assembly, it cannot meter during exposure as the raised mirror prevents light from reaching the metering sensor. This means the flash cannot be quenched during the exposure, which can lead to overexposure if the lighting changes while the shutter is open, e.g. from a mirrored surface moving to reflect light directly back into the lens or another camera's flash going off at the same time. Two, since the E-TTL algorithm assumes the subject to be metered is positioned under an AF sensor and biases the exposure calculation to that sensor's location in the frame, it can choose settings that do not take into account the brightness in other areas of the image, resulting in overexposure if the selected AF sensor covers an area of low reflectance, or (more commonly) underexposure if the selected sensor covers an area of high reflectance that results in a bright specular highlight.

=== E-TTL II ===
E-TTL II is a software improvement on E-TTL and is now a standard in all EOS cameras introduced with or after the Canon EOS-1D Mark II in 2004. E-TTL II is implemented in the body, not the flash unit, and therefore can use existing E-TTL flash units and EF/RF lenses.

The main improvement of E-TTL II is that it gives a more natural flash exposure, by being able to handle tricky scenes where the old E-TTL system would normally be thrown off. Such improvements are possible because E-TTL II incorporates lens-to-subject distance information in its calculation (with lenses that communicate distance information to the camera body) to assist in determining an approximate guide number for flash output. The flash metering system is also no longer linked to the AF system, whereas in E-TTL metering, bias is given to the selected AF point. Rather, E-TTL II compares the ambient and the pre-flash light levels of the scene to determine where the subject lies, in conjunction with subject distance information if available. This gives the photographer the flexibility to lock focus and recompose the scene without fooling the flash metering system. "Hot spots" (areas of high reflectance) that would normally throw off the flash metering system with systems such as E-TTL are also ignored in the calculation.

== Speedlite products ==
Speedlite is the trade name for Canon's line of external flashes for use with their EOS line of cameras. It is similar but not to be confused with Nikon Corporation's "Speedlight" brand for their flashes. The Speedlite name is also used by Ricoh for its unrelated product line of flash units, such as the Ricoh Speedlite 202.

The Speedlite name is intended to indicate that strobe flashes produce much shorter and more intense bursts of light than earlier photographic lighting systems, such as flashbulbs, or the continuous lighting used in some studio situations.

The model number indicates the guide number in decimeters, EG, the 430EX has a guide number of 43 m (141 ft) at 100ISO.

=== 90 series flashes ===
==== 90EX ====
Introduced in autumn 2012, the Speedlite 90EX is a very small unit designed specifically for the company's first mirrorless interchangeable-lens camera, the EOS M. It runs off two AAA batteries, and can serve as a wireless flash controller. At introduction, the 90EX was bundled with all EOS M kits sold in the EU, though not in the U.S.

=== 100-series flashes ===
==== 160E ====
The Speedlite 160E was a compact basic flash with a guide number of 16 m (52 ft), introduced in 1988 to accompany the EOS 750/850. It is unique among Speedlites in being powered not by AA alkaline batteries, but by a 2CR5 lithium photo battery. It was replaced in 1990 by the 200E.

=== 200 series flashes ===
==== 200E ====
The Speedlite 200E was a minor upgrade to the 160E, bumping the output to GN 20 m (66 ft) and taking regular AA batteries.

==== 220EX ====
Introduced in 2000, Speedlite 220EX is a compact entry-level flash unit with a guide number of 22 m (at ISO 100). It operates with four AA batteries, and does not feature any wireless capabilities.

==== 270EX and 270EX II ====
Speedlite 270EX (introduced in March 2009) and 270EX II (introduced in February 2011) are compact entry-level flashes with a guide number of 27 m (ISO 100).

270EX features a zoom head which covers 28–55 mm lenses and bounce head capability. 270EX II adds wireless slave mode and remote shutter triggering.

=== 300 series flashes ===
==== 300EZ ====
The Speedlite 300EZ was a compact zoom flash released at the introduction of the EOS system in 1987 with the EOS 650. It has a guide number of 30 m (98 ft), takes 4 AA batteries, and incorporates automatic zooming of the flash head to match the angle of illumination to EF lenses in the range of 28 to 70mm. It also has a visible-light auxiliary AF illuminator which projects a pattern of red lines on the subject to aid autofocusing in dark environments.

==== 320EX ====
In 2011, Canon introduced a new flash that has a built-in LED light. One reviewer noted that the flash occupied a completely new niche in the Canon flash lineup, "slotting between the 270EX II and the 430EX II", and added that it did not replace a previous model.

The LED can be used as a spotlight to see objects in dim light before taking a photo, but is mainly present to provide fill light for video shooting. The aforementioned reviewer also stated that the LED could be used in some situations as a substitute for a standard flashlight.

==== 380EX ====
This unit is very similar to 430EX in terms of E-TTL functions and power levels. It does not feature an LCD screen like 400 series systems but has several LEDs indicating zoom position and other functions. It is the first E-TTL unit from Canon sold as a dedicated flash for the first E-TTL cameras - EOS 50 (Elan II) and EOS 50e (Elan IIe), which were introduced in 1995.

=== 400 Series Flashes ===
Canon's external flashes with model numbers in the 400 range tend to be their mid-range external flashes. They all tend to have the ability to adjust the direction of the flash via a swivel head, which allows the photographer to bounce the flash off walls, ceilings, and other objects, diffusing the light that hits the subject and reducing the harsh shadows associated with on-camera flash. The 400 series differs from the higher end 500 series mostly by lacking a remote controller.

==== 420EX ====
The Speedlite 420EX is an external flash formerly made by Canon. The Speedlite 420EX is one of Canon's older mid-range flashes, being replaced by the 430EX in 2005. It was primarily intended for users wanting to step up from the entry-level flashes, as well as for use as a slave flash along with the more advanced Speedlite 550EX flash.

Compared to its predecessor, the 380EX, it provided slightly more power, an improved autofocus assist beam, tilt and swivel (the 380EX could only tilt), and the ability to serve as a slave in Canon's wireless multiple-flash system. Like the 380EX, the 420EX did not provide user controls (other than enabling and disabling high-speed sync); any flash-related settings, such as exposure compensation or second-curtain synchronization, had to be set using the body.

Its autofocus assist system was designed to cover Canon's autofocus layouts with between 1 and 7 autofocus points; it was not designed to cover the 45-point autofocus layout used by higher-end bodies. It used two lamps to project horizontal and vertical patterns, which matched the line sensitivity of the autofocus sensors used in those autofocus layouts. Either or both patterns would be projected depending on the body being used and the user's selection of autofocus sensor(s).

==== 430EX, 430EX II and 430EX III-RT ====
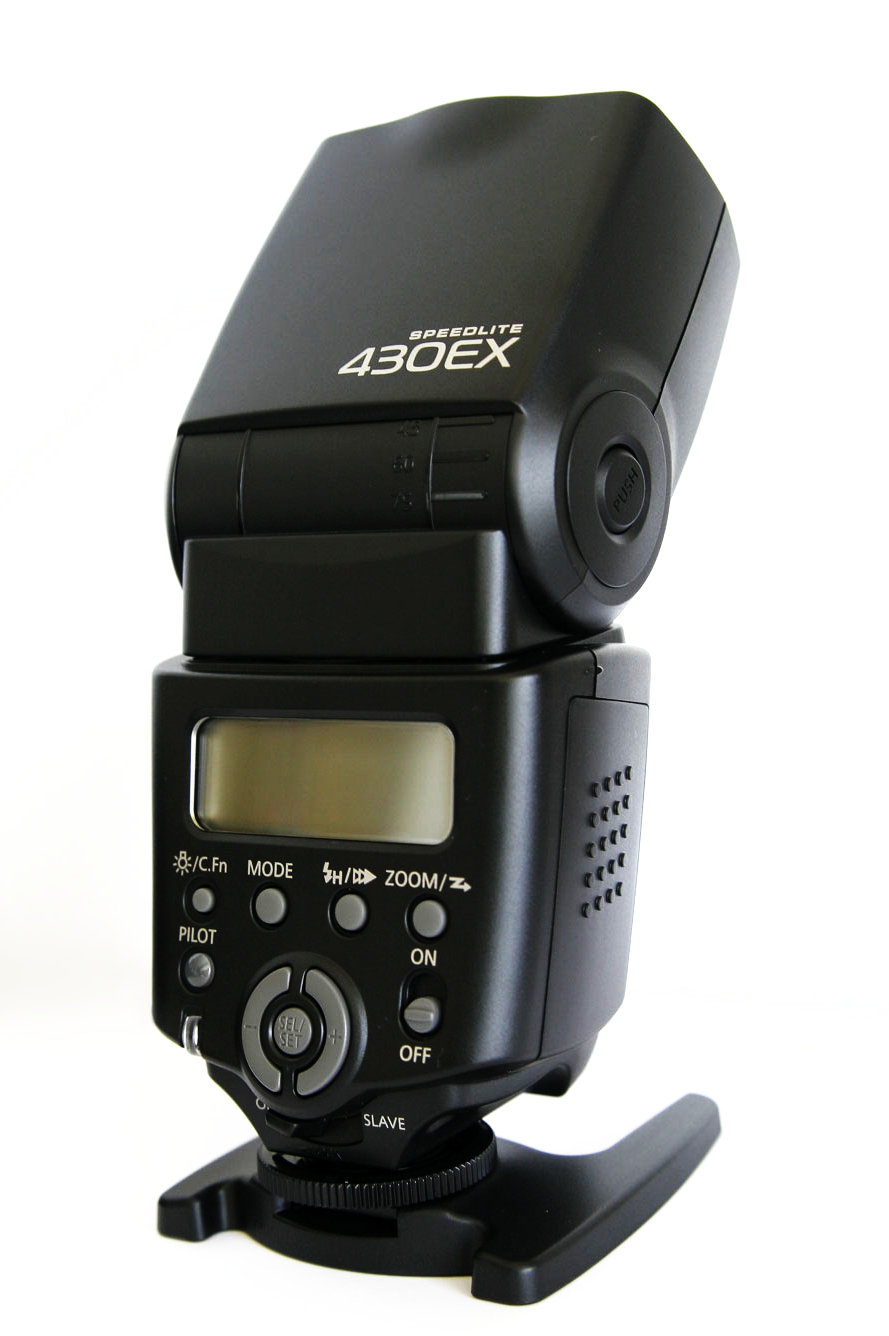
Canon Speedlite 430EX

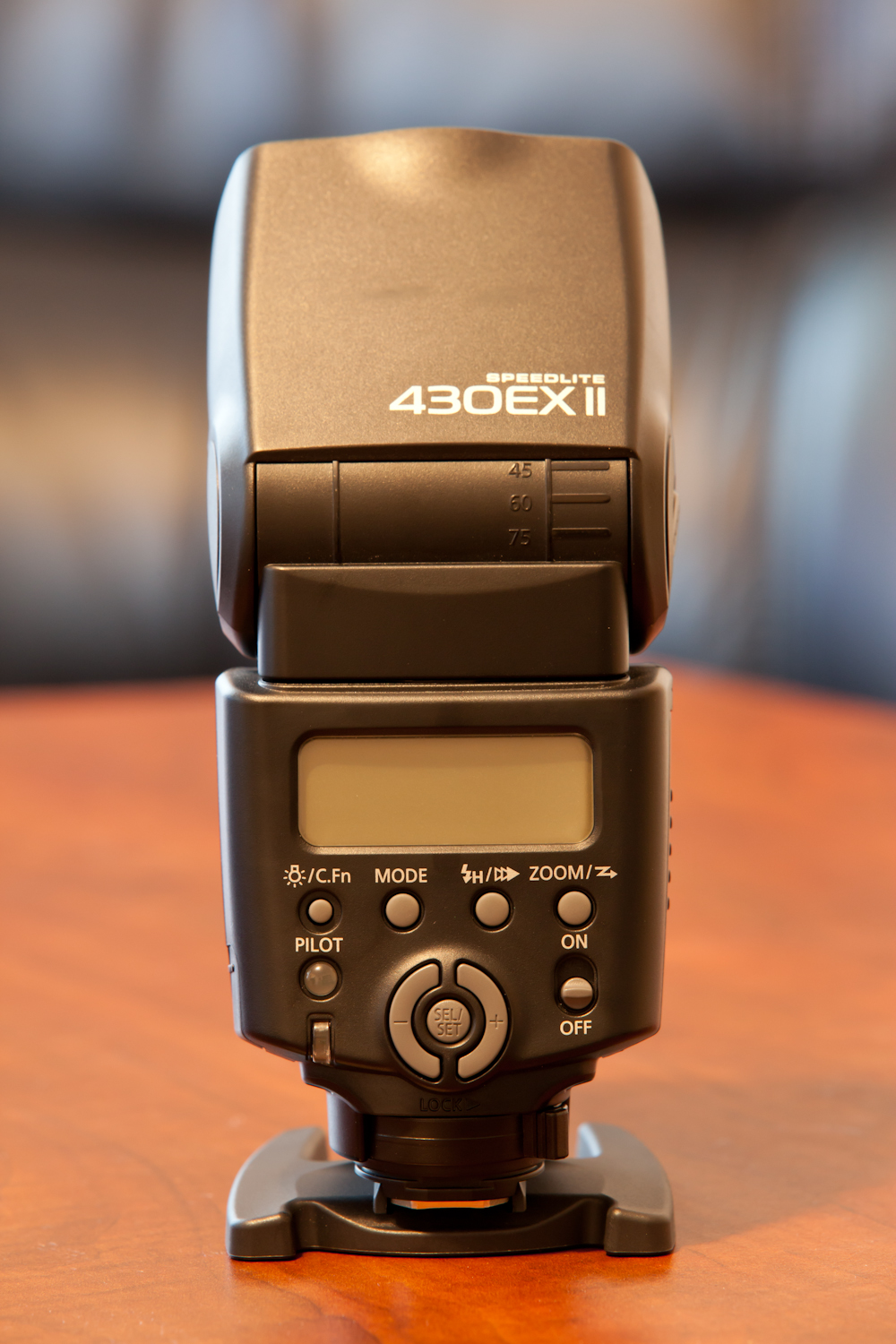
Canon Speedlite 430EX II

The Speedlite 430EX was introduced 22 August 2005 as a replacement for the 420 series. It has Guide Numbers of 141 ft/43m (at ISO 100 and 105 mm).

It can be used as a wireless optically controlled slave with flashes, flash controllers, or cameras which support Canon's infrared control system, including the 580 Speedlite series, the ST-E2 flash controller, and cameras such as the 7D Mark II. It supports TTL, E-TTL and E-TTL II.

The flash head can swivel up (to 90°), right (to 90°) and left (to 180°). The swivel properties allow the photographer to bounce the flash off walls, ceilings, and other objects, diffusing the light that hits the subject and reducing the harsh shadows associated with on-camera flash.

The 430EX II was announced on June 10, 2008 and improved on its predecessor by adding a stronger, all metal foot with quick release mechanism, silent flash recycling, 20% shorter recycle times and support for setup through the camera's menu system.

The 430EX III-RT was announced in July 2015 and shipped September 2015. It is smaller, lighter, faster, has increased swivel angles, revised controls, and brings master and slave compatibility with Canon's new radio control system in addition to functioning as a slave with the earlier infrared/optical control system.

==== 470EX-AI ====
The Speedlite 470EX-AI is an external flash made by Canon for use with their EOS line of cameras that was announced on February 25, 2018. It is Canon's first flash to feature AI Bounce, which "determines the optimal bounce angle and swivels into position to capture the appropriate camera exposure and flash output."

=== 500 and 600 series flashes ===
Canon's external flashes with model numbers in the 500 and 600 ranges tend to be their high end external flashes. All three products so far have included a controller that enables wireless control of other flashes. Another common feature is the ability to adjust the direction of the flash via a swivel head. The swivel properties allow the photographer to bounce the flash off walls, ceilings, and other objects, diffusing the light that hits the subject and reducing the harsh shadows associated with on-camera flash.

==== 550EX ====
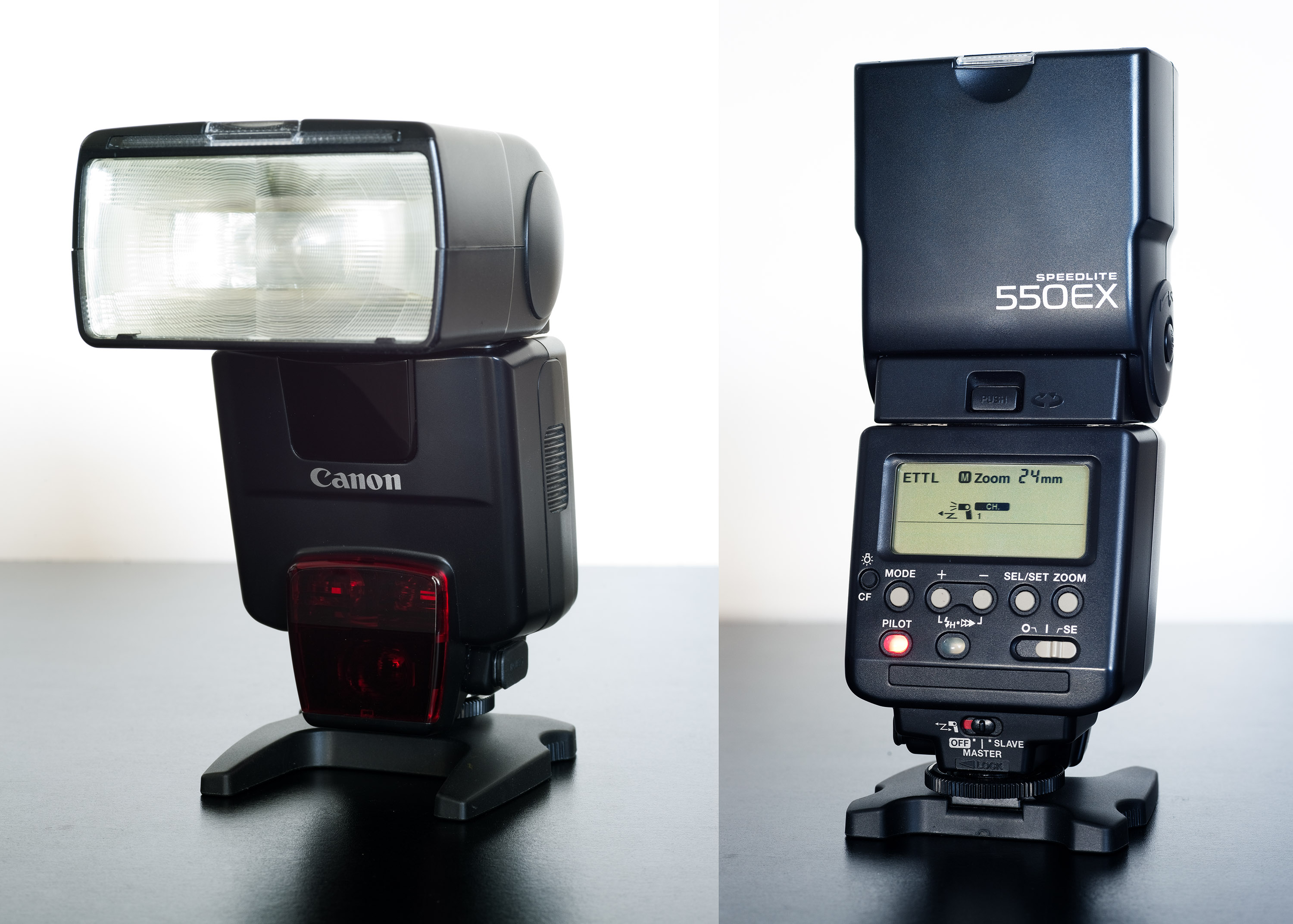
A Canon Speedlite 550EX flash unit

The Speedlite 550EX (introduced September 1998) is a flash made by Canon for use with their EOS line of cameras, primarily the Canon EOS 3. The 550EX can act as a controller that enables wireless control of other flashes. Until the release of the Speedlite 580EX in late 2004, the 550EX was Canon's top-of-the-line flash.

==== 580EX and 580EX II ====
The Speedlite 580EX (introduced in 2004 with a price of $480) and Speedlite 580EX II are flashes made by Canon for use with their EOS line of cameras. The 580EX was succeeded by the Speedlite 580EX II in early 2008. The flashes in the 500EX series can act as a controller that enables wireless control of other flashes. They also have a slightly stronger maximum flash output and a more durable casing than 430EX units.

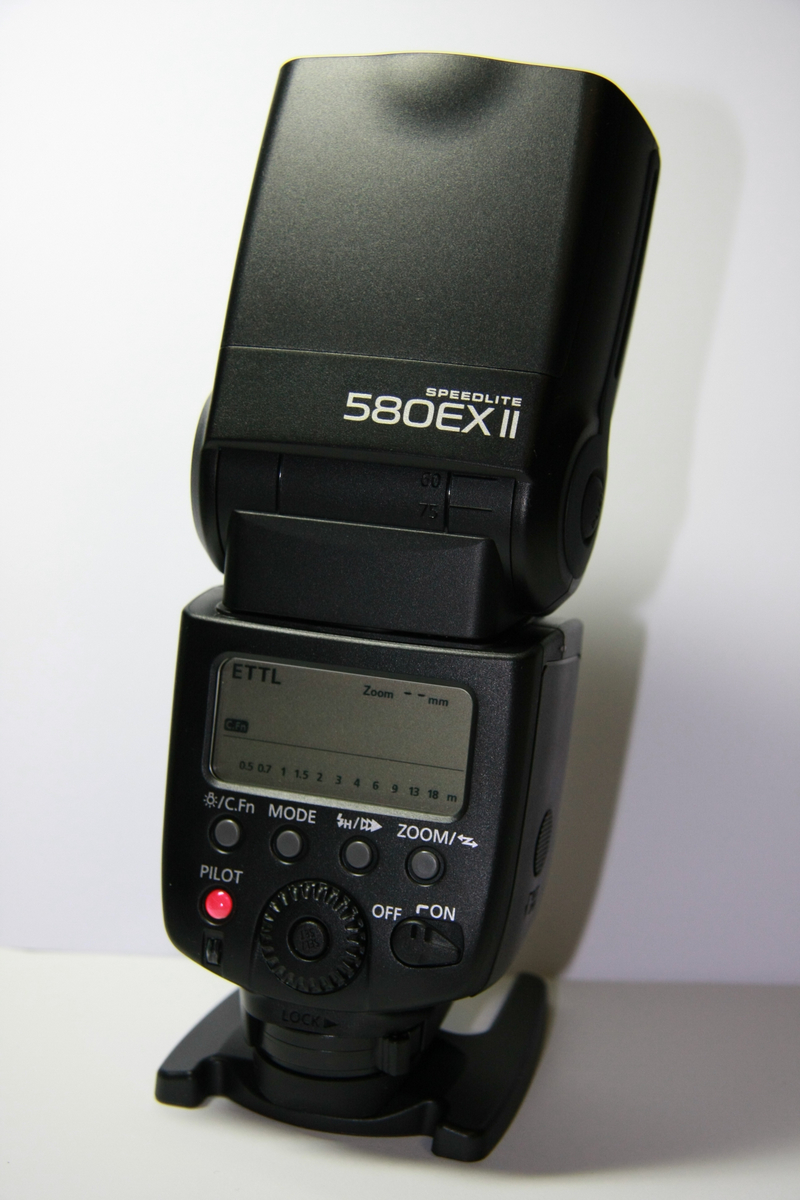
Back

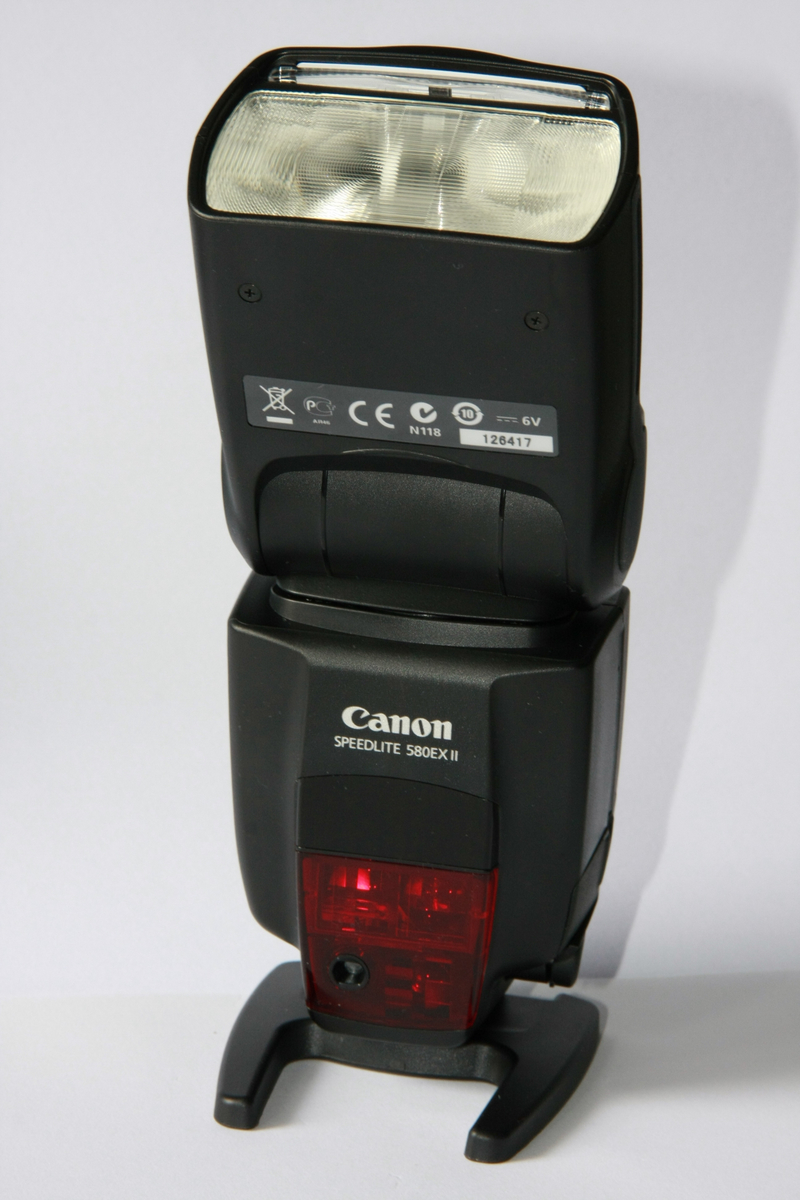
Front

Canon Speedlite 580EX II (with the flash head in an upright position)

Key features of the 580EX II that make it desirable are a built-in PC terminal, easy locking metal foot, faster recycling time, silent charge, a much easier-to-use battery cover and support for setup through the camera's menu system.

The unit is also fully sealed against moisture and weather conditions with silicon gaskets all around. However some better features on the earlier model were dropped like EL backlight on the LCD (580EX II uses simple led back-light) and designated master/slave switch. Both units are made in Japan.

==== 600EX-RT and 600EX II-RT ====
The Speedlite 600EX-RT was announced on March 2, 2012 alongside the new Canon EOS 5D Mark III. The 600EX-RT features new bi-directional 2.4 GHz wireless radio communication, compatible with the also-announced Speedlite ST-E3-RT transmitter; as well as backwards compatibility with the optical triggering of any combination of Speedlite 580EX II, 580EX, 550EX, 430EX II, 430EX, 420EX, 320EX, or 270EX II flashes.

Both the 600EX-RT and ST-E3-RT may be subject to legal restrictions of use when in their Radio Transmission (RT) mode. Official Canon documentation accompanying these units, "Regions of Use and Restrictions", lists 58 countries where the units do comply with local radio wave regulations. Countries that are not listed include: the Republic of South Africa, Israel, Argentina, Pakistan, to name but a few. Customers are advised to "not use this product in areas it was not designed for".

The 600EX II-RT (June 2016) improved on flash firing among other features.

=== EL-100 ===
The Speedlite EL-100 is a compact size flash available since October 2018. It weighs only 190g (without batteries) while providing full swivel and bounce support as well as ability to control other Speedlite flashes in master mode.

=== EL-1 ===
The Speedlite EL-1 was announced in October, 2020, and released in February, 2021, replacing the 600EX II-RT as Canon's flagship flash.

New features include rechargeable Li-ion Battery Pack (LP-EL), upgraded Xenon Flash tube and internal cooling system, as well as dust- and water-resistance of the same standard as found on Canon's EOS-1D camera.

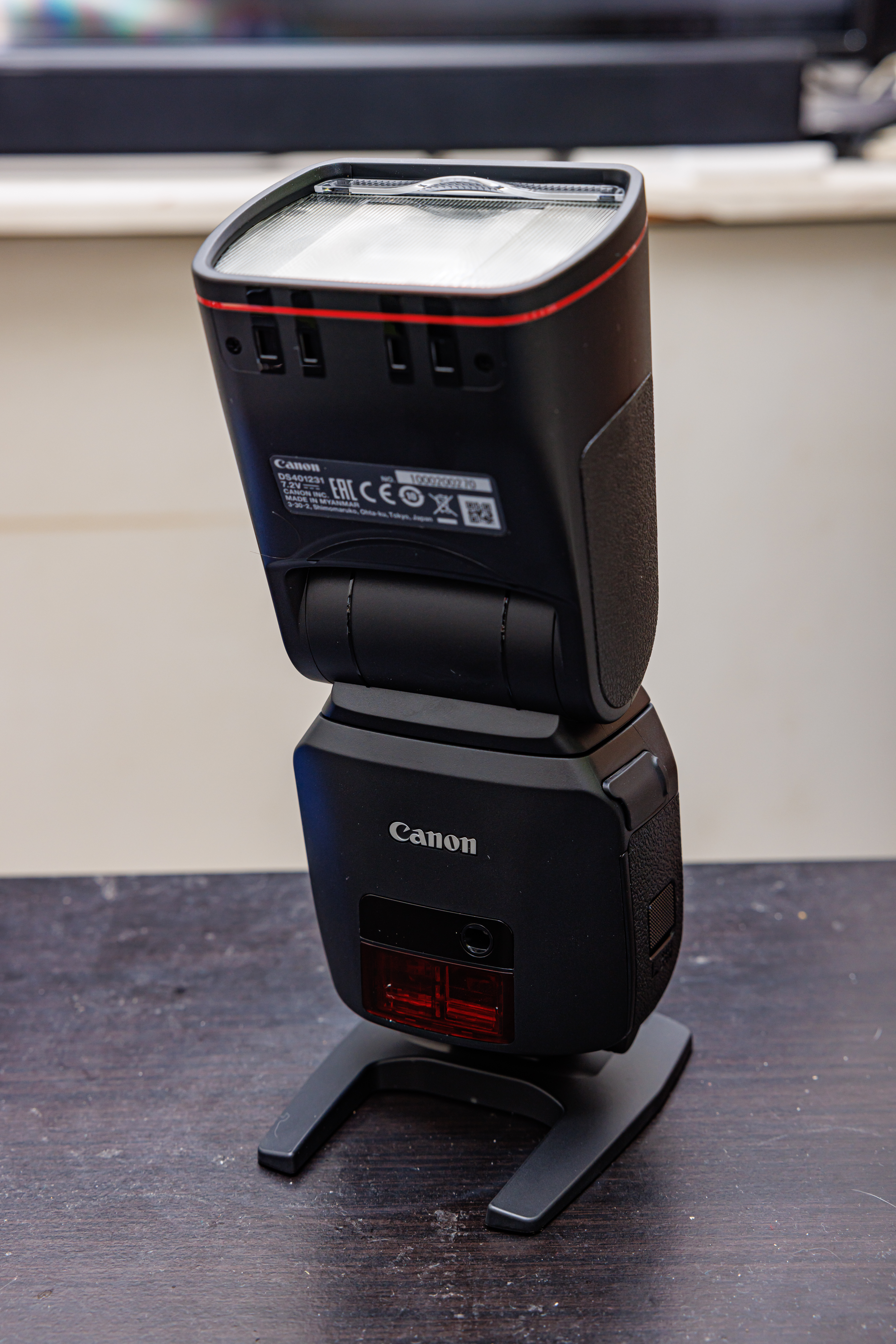
Canon Speedlite Flash SPEEDLITE EL-1

=== ST-E2 transmitter ===
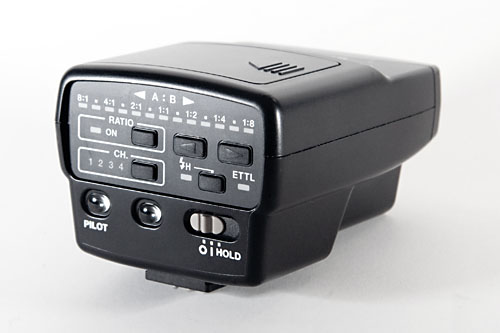
Back

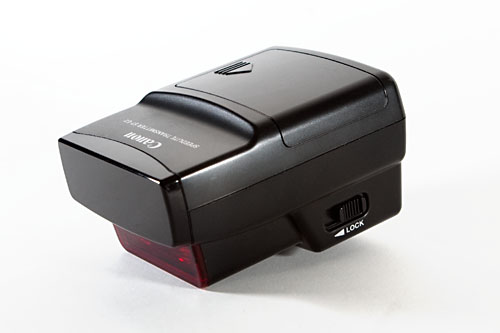
Front

Speedlite Transmitter ST-E2

The Speedlite Transmitter ST-E2 is a camera-mounted infrared controller for Canon's flashes. It allows for multiple off-camera flashes to be fired in E-TTL mode without the need for connecting wires.

Flashes being triggered by the ST-E2 can be assigned to either group A or group B, and the ST-E2 can be configured to with a user-set ratio of flash output between the two groups, with ratios varying from 8:1 to 1:8 in half-stop increments.

High-speed sync is also supported by the ST-E2, but it does not support second-curtain synchronization or stroboscopic flash.

A built-in focus assist light allows the ST-E2 to be used to help a camera focus in very low light.

The Speedlite 550EX, 580EX, 580EX II and the 600EX-RT flashes (when used as a master flash) use modulation of the pre flash from the main flash tube for communicating with slave flashes. The ST-E2 also uses a modulated flash tube for this purpose, but it is fitted with a near infra-red filter (it serves no other purpose). It has a quoted range of 10-15m indoors, and 8-10m outdoors.

The ST-E2 uses a single 2CR5 lithium battery, which is said to be good for 1500 transmissions.

=== ST-E3-RT transmitter ===
The Speedlite ST-E3-RT was also announced on March 2, 2012. It features a new bi-directional 2.4 GHz wireless communications with a range of 30m, but does not control the older IR-based Speedlites. The ST-E3-RT does not have a focus-assist light, but now uses more commonly available AA batteries, and supports high-speed sync.

The ST-E3-RT II was introduced February 4, 2021 and brings control over 2nd-curtain sync, support for the Speedlite EL-1’s low-power 1/8192 micro flash, and FE memory which saves E-TTL settings for further manual adjustment. All of these improvements can be retrofitted to the original ST-E3-RT by a Canon service center.

=== ST-E10 transmitter ===
The ST-E10 was introduced in September, 2021 along with the EOS R3, as a small, lightweight radio flash controller for cameras having the Multi-Function Shoe. It can control five groups of Speedlites over a distance of 30 meters. Remote triggering of the camera from one of the Speedlites is also possible.

The only control on the unit is a MENU button, which is a shortcut to the camera's flash control settings. All flash configuration is done using the camera's menu or with the Canon Connect app on a device. It is powered by the camera, so no batteries are needed, and it does not have a focus-assist light.

=== Macro flash products ===
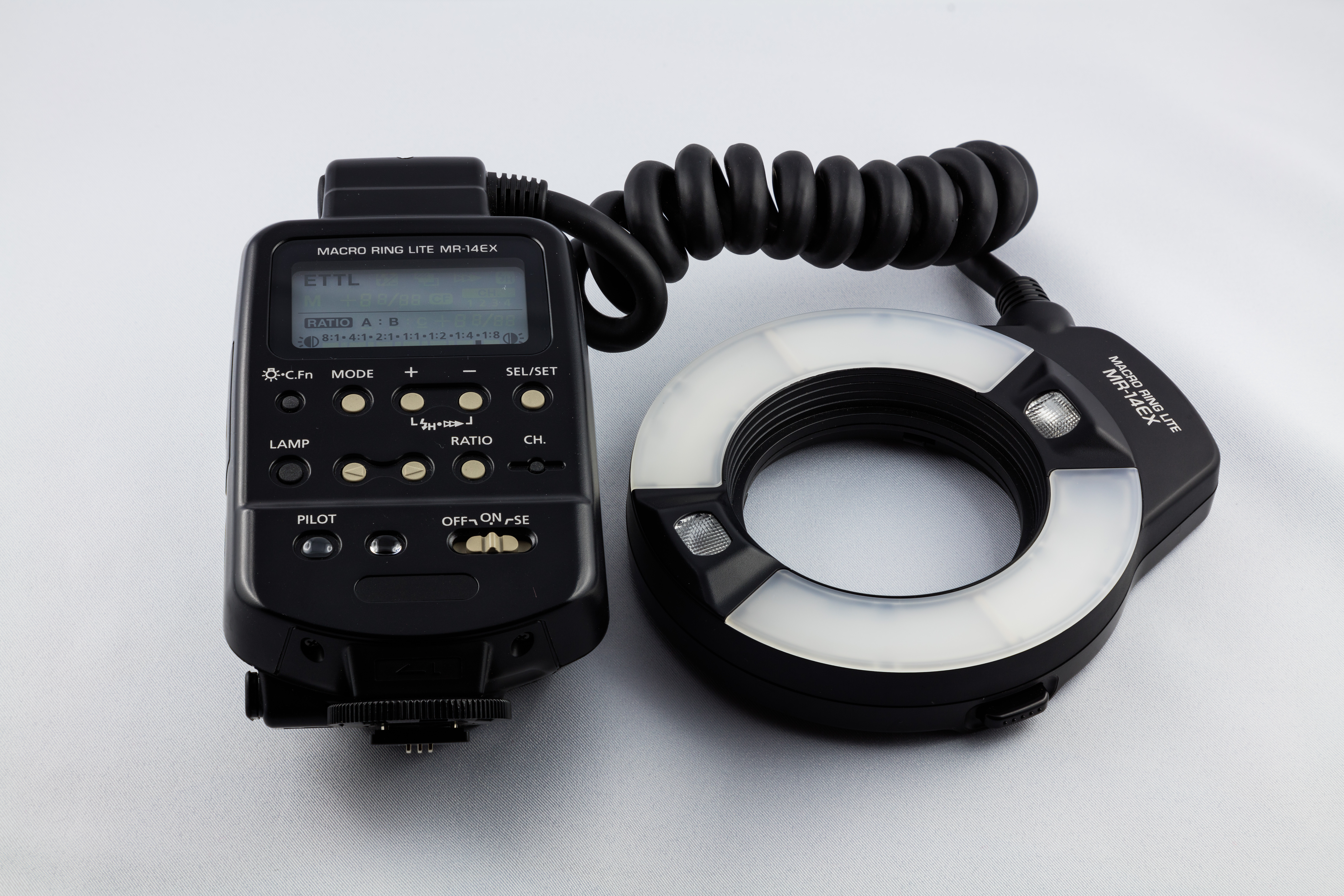
Canon Macro Ring Lite MR-14EX

Canon currently produces three flash products for macro photography

- Macro Twin Lite MT-26EX-RT
- Macro Twin Lite MT-24EX
- Macro Ring Lite MR-14EX II circular-shaped flash (replaced the earlier MR-14EX model)

=== Model specifications ===
Table of models
Model	600EX II-RT	600EX-RT	580EX II	580EX	430EX III-RT	430EX II	430EX
Release date	June 2016	March 2012	February 2007	August 2004	September 2015	June 2008	August 2005
Item codes		5296B002	1946B002	9445A002		2805B002	0298B002
Retail price (US)	$580	$550		$480	$300		
Max. guide number (ISO 100)	60 metres (200 ft)	60 metres (200 ft)	58 metres (190 ft)	58 metres (190 ft)	43 metres (141 ft)	43 metres (141 ft)	43 metres (141 ft)
Swivel range	360°	360°	360°	360°	330°	270°	270°
RF (radio frequency)	Master & Slave	Master & Slave	No	No	Master & Slave	No	No
IR (infrared)	Master & Slave	Master & Slave	Master & Slave	Master & Slave	Slave only	Slave only	Slave only
Accepts external power	Yes	Yes	Yes	Yes	No	No	No
Weight (without batteries)	435 grams (15.3 oz)	425 grams (15.0 oz)	375 grams (13.2 oz)	375 grams (13.2 oz)	295 grams (10.4 oz)	330 grams (12 oz)	330 grams (12 oz)
Predecessor	600EX-RT	580EX II	580EX	550EX	430EX II	430EX	420EX
Notable features over predecessor		RF, slightly greater flash range, self-cleaning shoe	quick-release clamp, slightly faster cycling time, menu setup support, weather resistant sealing, silent charge circuit		Revised interface. RF slave and master. Smaller, lighter, quicker recycle times.	quick-release clamp, slightly faster cycling time, menu setup support	

Table of models
Model	320EX	270EX II	270EX	90EX	MT-24EX
Release date	February 2011	February 2011	March 2009	July 2012	
Item codes					
Retail price (US)	$239.00	$169.00			
Max. guide number (ISO 100)	32 m (105 ft)	27 m (89 ft)	27 m (89 ft)	9 m (30 ft)	22 m (72 ft)
Swivel Range	360°				Multiple options
RF (radio frequency)	No	No	No	No	No
IR (infrared)	Slave only	Slave only	Slave only	Master	Master only
Accepts external power	No	No	No	No	Yes
Weight (without batteries)	275 g	155 g	145 g	50 g	
Predecessor	None	270EX	220EX	None	
Notable features over predecessor	LED light for video/Live View)	wireless slave mode, remote shutter triggering	90 degrees tilting zoom head, a near-silent recycling in a time of just 3.9 seconds.		Can be mounted on the front of a macro lens

== Misc. accessories ==
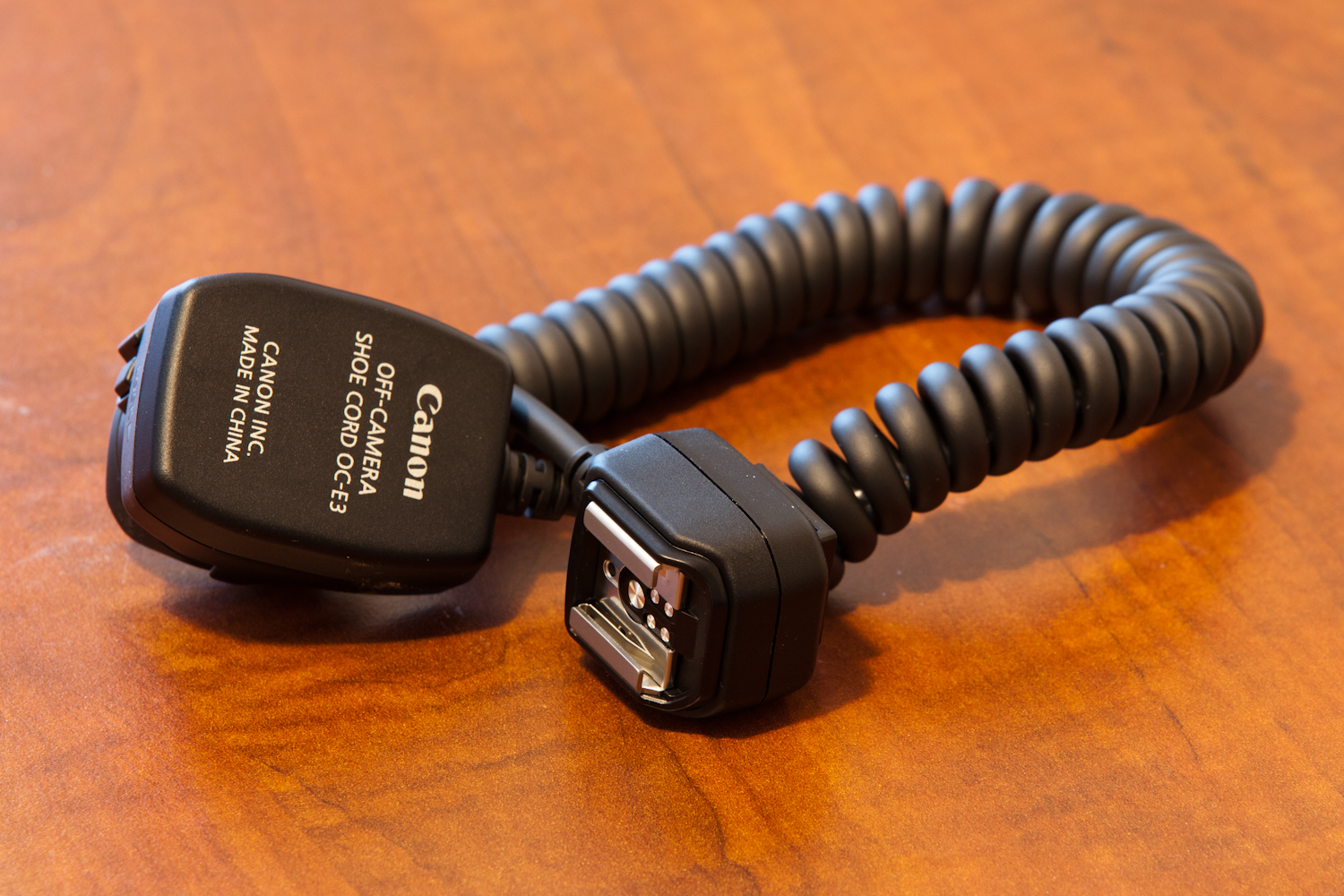
Canon OC-E3 Off-Camera Shoe Cord

Canon also sells several supporting accessories for its Speedlite products. Among these are

- Off-Camera Shoe Cord OC-E3,
- Compact Battery Pack CP-E4 (an external battery)
- Speedlite Bracket SB-E2, which allows off-axis flash
- Multi-Function Shoe adapter AD-E1, which preserves weather sealing when certain accessories with the older hotshoe are mounted to a Multi-Function hotshoe.

== See also ==
- Speedlight, Nikon's competing products
