= Canon EOS 650D =

2012 APS-C digital single-lens reflex camera

Canon EOS 650D Canon EOS Rebel T4i Canon EOS Kiss X6i
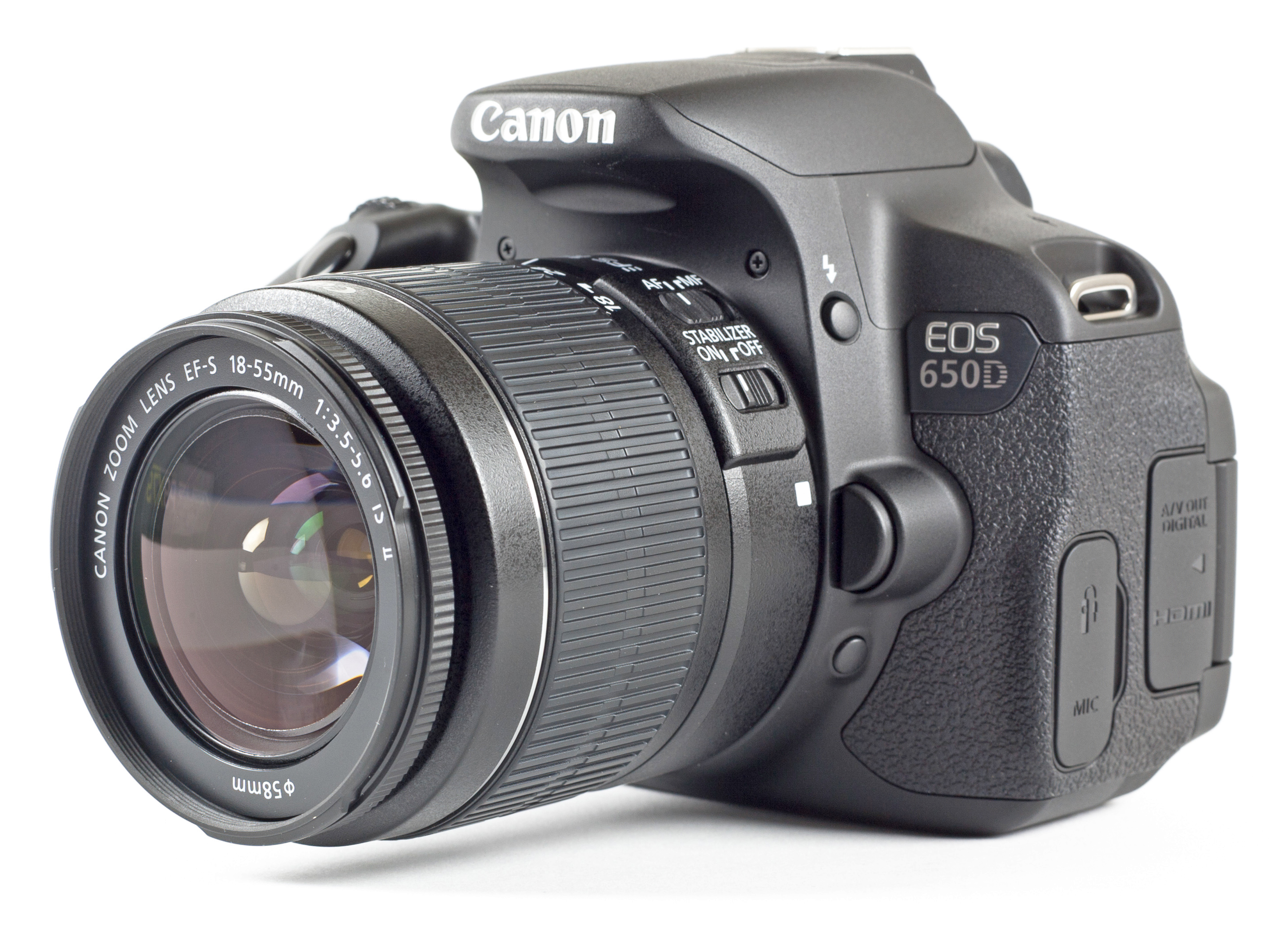

Overview
- Maker: Canon Inc.
- Type: Digital single-lens reflex camera

Lens
- Lens mount: Canon EF-S
- Lens: Interchangeable

Sensor/medium
- Sensor type: CMOS
- Sensor size: 22.3 × 14.9 mm (APS-C format)
- Maximum resolution: 5184 × 3456 (18.0 effective megapixels)
- Film speed: 100 - 12800 (expandable to H: 25600)
- Storage media: SD/SDHC/SDXC (UHS-I bus supported)

Focusing
- Focus modes: One-Shot, AI Focus, AI Servo, Live View (FlexiZone - Multi, FlexiZone - Single, Face Detection, Movie Servo), Manual
- Focus areas: 9 cross-type AF points

Exposure/metering
- Exposure modes: Scene Intelligent Auto, Flash Off, Creative Auto, Portrait, Landscape, Close-up, Sports, Night Portrait, Handheld Night Scene, HDR Backlight Control, Program AE, Shutter priority AE, Aperture priority AE, Manual exposure, Movie
- Exposure metering: Full aperture TTL, 63 zones iFCL SPC
- Metering modes: Evaluative, Partial, Spot, Center-weighted Average

Flash
- Flash: E-TTL II auto-pop-up built-in / External
- Flash bracketing: Available

Shutter
- Shutter: Electronic focal-plane
- Shutter speed range: 1/4000 sec. - 30 sec. and Bulb; X-sync at 1/200 sec.
- Continuous shooting: 5.0 fps for 22 JPEG frames (30 frames with UHS-I card) or for 6 RAW frames

Viewfinder
- Viewfinder: Fixed eye-level pentamirror
- Viewfinder magnification: 0.85×
- Frame coverage: 95%

Image processing
- Image processor: DIGIC 5
- White balance: Auto, Daylight, Shade, Cloudy, Tungsten, White Fluorescent, Flash, Custom
- WB bracketing: +/- 3 stops for 3 frames

General
- LCD screen: 3.0 in (7.6 cm) Clear View II colour TFT vari-angle touchscreen with 1,040,000 dots, live preview
- Battery: Li-Ion LP-E8 rechargeable (1040 mAh)
- Optional battery packs: BG-E8 grip allows the use of one LP-E8 battery or two LP-E8 batteries
- Dimensions: 133.1×99.5×79.7 mm (5.24×3.92×3.14 in) (W * H * D)
- Weight: 525 g (18.5 oz) (body only)
- Made in: Taiwan / Japan

Chronology
- Predecessor: Canon EOS 600D
- Successor: Canon EOS 700D

The Canon EOS 650D, known as the Kiss X6i in Japan or the Rebel T4i in America, is an 18.0 megapixels digital single-lens reflex camera (DSLR), announced by Canon on 8 June 2012. It is the successor of the EOS 600D/Kiss X5/Rebel T3i and is the predecessor of the EOS 700D/Kiss X7i/Rebel T5i. Sales began on 15 June 2012. At introduction, recommended retail prices for the body were US$849.99, £699.99 (including VAT), and €839.99 (including VAT).

== Features ==
The 650D is the first Canon DSLR that has continuous autofocus in video mode and live view, which Canon calls "Hybrid CMOS AF". This feature, intended mainly for video recording, is implemented through a new sensor technology in which certain pixels are dedicated to phase-detection AF (traditionally used in DSLRs) and others to contrast-detection AF (used in camcorders). When the subject is in the center of the frame, phase detection is used to identify the subject's current location, with contrast detection then used to fine-tune the focus. Hybrid CMOS AF will be available with all lenses, but other improvements to video autofocus, specifically in smoothness and quietness, will depend on the use of Canon's new STM lenses, two of which were announced alongside the 650D. DPReview noted that the Hybrid CMOS AF system was similar to the focusing system of the Nikon 1 mirrorless cameras.

The 650D is also the first DSLR from any manufacturer equipped with a touchscreen, although it is not the first interchangeable-lens camera with this feature. Almost all shooting parameters and camera functions can be controlled either via the touchscreen, or by buttons and the control dial.

The AF system used for stills shooting through the optical viewfinder is inherited from the EOS 60D. All 9 points are cross-type, as opposed to only the central point in the 600D. The central point is also dual cross-type (i.e., also sensitive to diagonal lines) at f/2.8. The EOS 650D is built with two new shooting modes designed for inexperienced photographers: the Handheld Night Scene mode and the HDR backlight mode. The Handheld Night Scene mode reduces the risk of blur while taking nighttime shots without a tripod while the HDR backlight mode uses Canon's patented multishot system to combine three images into one, balancing both foreground and background exposure.

=== Feature list ===
- 18.0 megapixel APS-C CMOS sensor
- DIGIC 5 image processor with 14-bit processing
- 95% viewfinder frame coverage with 0.85x magnification
- 1080p HD video recording at 24p, 25p (25 Hz) and 30p (29.97 Hz) with drop frame timing
- 720p HD video recording at 50p (50 Hz) and 60p (59.94 Hz)
- 480p ED video recording at 50p (50 Hz) and 60p (59.94 Hz)
- 5.0 frames per second continuous shooting
- ISO sensitivity 100 – 12800 (expandable to H: 25600)
- 3.0" Clear View II vari-angle LCD touchscreen with 1.040.000 dots resolution
- 9 points AF system, all cross-type at f/5.6. Center point is high precision, double cross-type at f/2.8
- 63-zone color sensitive metering system
- Built-in Speedlite transmitter
  - The camera is compatible with Canon's latest radio-controlled flashes, but the built-in transmitter is infrared-only.
- Built-in stereo microphone
- 3.5mm microphone jack for external microphones or recorders

One feature of the 600D missing from the 650D is the former's 3-10x digital zoom capability when shooting 1080p video.

=== Ergonomics ===
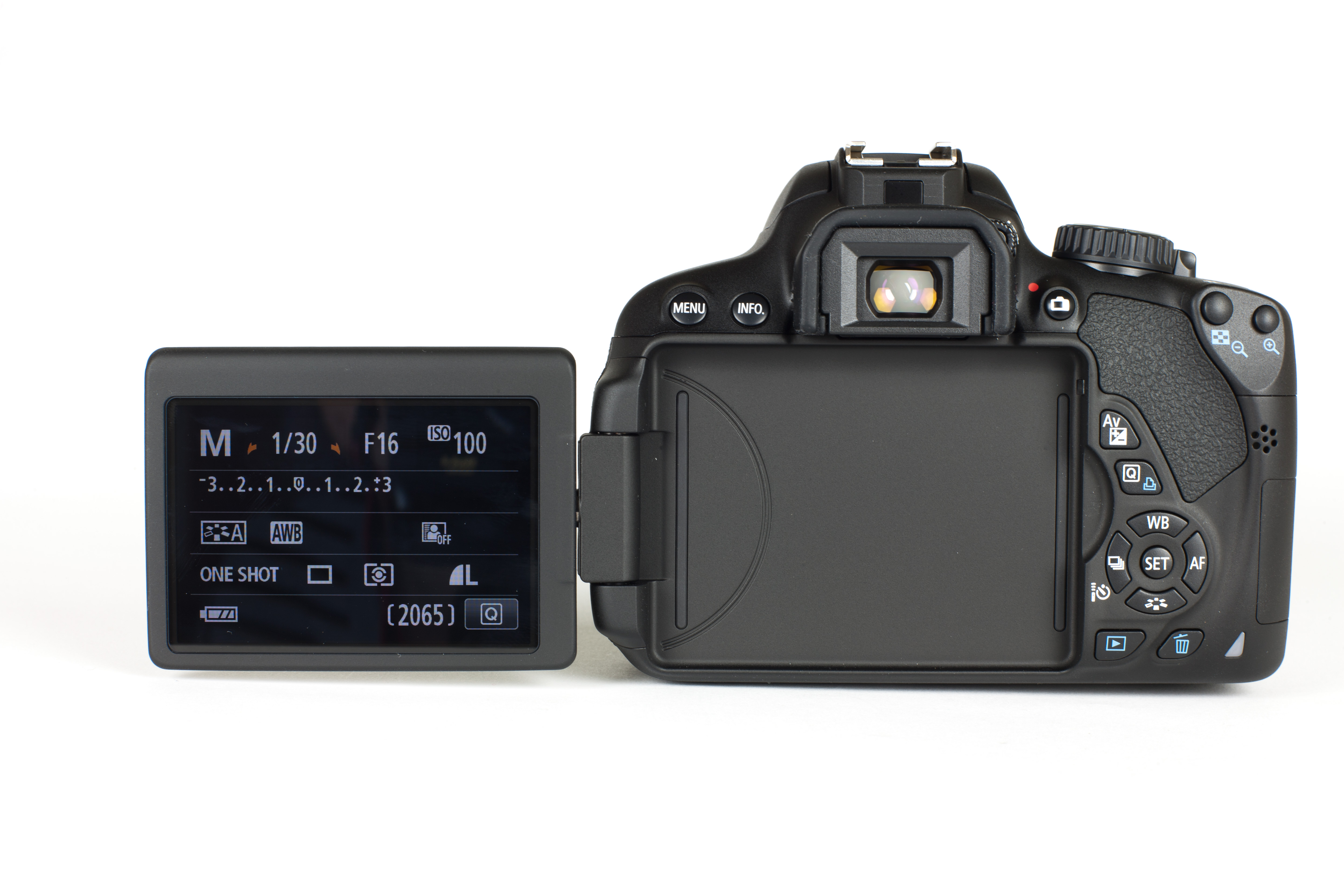
The articulated screen

The 650D has roughly the same dimensions as the 600D, and apart from the touchscreen has largely the same physical controls as previous models. One notable difference is that the two-position power switch of the 600D is replaced with a three-position switch on the 650D, with the added position used to activate the video shooting mode.

=== Speed ===
The DIGIC 5 processor, used for the first time in a consumer-level Canon DSLR, allows for a significant increase in continuous shooting from the 600D of 5.0 frames per second, up from 3.7 frames per second. The 650D is also the first Canon DSLR to support the UHS-I bus. The 650D's autofocus during live view mode is approximately two times faster than the 600D.

Type	Sensor	Class	00	01	02	03	04	05	06	07	08	09	10	11	12	13	14	15	16	17	18	19	20	21	22	23	24	25
DSLR	Full-frame	Flagship				1Ds		1Ds Mk II			1Ds Mk III					1D C												
DSLR	Full-frame	Flagship				1Ds		1Ds Mk II			1Ds Mk III				1D X					1D X Mk II ^{T}			1D X Mk III ^{T}					
DSLR	APS-H	Flagship			1D			1D Mk II	1D Mk II N		1D Mk III		1D Mk IV															
DSLR	Full-frame	Professional																	5DS / 5DS R									
DSLR	Full-frame	Professional							5D			_{x} 5D Mk II			_{x} 5D Mk III					5D Mk IV ^{T}								
DSLR	Full-frame	Advanced														_{x} 6D					_{x} 6D Mk II ^{AT}							
DSLR	APS-C	Advanced											_{x} 7D					_{x} 7D Mk II										
DSLR	APS-C	Mid-range						20Da								_{x} 60Da ^{A}												
DSLR	APS-C	Mid-range		D30	D60	10D		20D	30D		40D	_{x} 50D		_{x} 60D ^{A}		_{x} 70D ^{AT}		80D ^{AT}					90D ^{AT}					
DSLR	APS-C	Mid-range																	760D ^{AT}		77D ^{AT}							
DSLR	APS-C	Entry-level					300D	350D		400D	450D	_{x} 500D	_{x} 550D	_{x} 600D ^{A}		_{x} 650D ^{AT}	_{x} 700D ^{AT}		_{x} 750D ^{AT}		800D ^{AT}			850D ^{AT}				
DSLR	APS-C	Entry-level															_{x} 100D ^{T}		_{x} 200D ^{AT}				250D ^{AT}					
DSLR	APS-C	Entry-level										1000D		_{x} 1100D			_{x} 1200D			1300D		2000D						
DSLR	APS-C	Value																				4000D						
Early models			Canon EOS DCS 5 (1995); Canon EOS DCS 3 (1995); Canon EOS DCS 1 (1995); Canon EOS D2000 (1998); Canon EOS D6000 (1998)																									
Type	Sensor	Spec																										
Type	Sensor	Spec	00	01	02	03	04	05	06	07	08	09	10	11	12	13	14	15	16	17	18	19	20	21	22	23	24	25
