= Canon EOS 70D =

2013 APS-C digital single-lens reflex camera

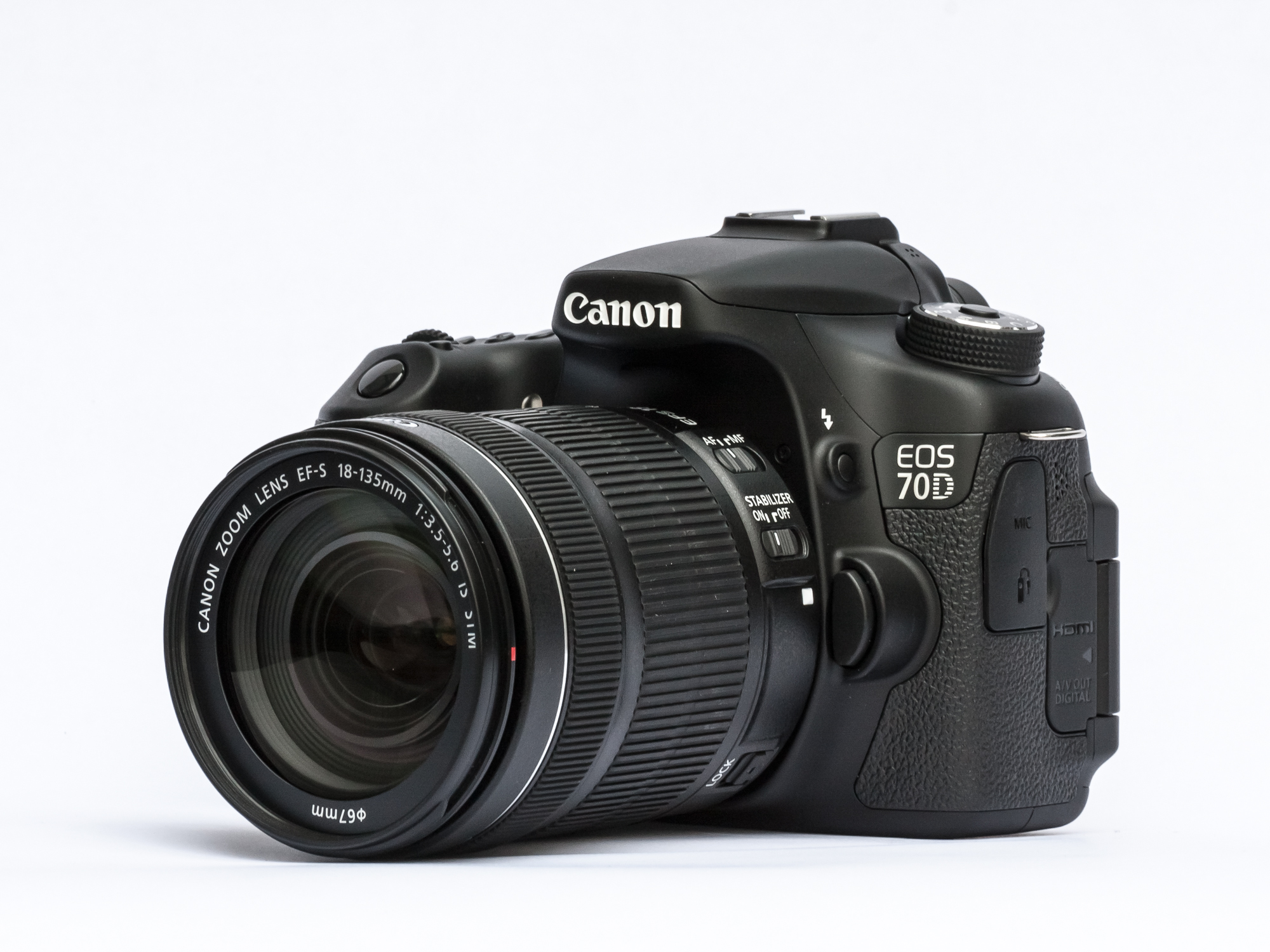

Overview
- Maker: Canon Inc.
- Type: Digital single-lens reflex camera
- Intro price: US$1199/€1099/£1080 (body only)

Lens
- Lens mount: Canon EF-S
- Lens: Interchangeable

Sensor/medium
- Sensor type: CMOS
- Sensor size: 22.5 × 15.0 mm (APS-C format)
- Maximum resolution: 5472 × 3648 pixels (4,1 μm pixel size) (20.2 effective megapixels)
- Film speed: 100 – 12800 in 1/3 stop increments (expandable to H: 25600)
- Storage media: SD/SDHC/SDXC card (UHS-I bus supported)

Focusing
- Focus modes: One Shot, AI Focus, AI Servo, Live View (FlexiZone - Multi, FlexiZone - Single, Face detection, Movie Servo), Manual
- Focus areas: 19 cross-type AF points

Exposure/metering
- Exposure modes: Scene Intelligent Auto, Flash Off, Creative Auto, Special Scenes (Portrait, Landscape, Close-up, Sports, Night Portrait, Handheld Night Scene, HDR Backlight Control), Program AE, Shutter priority AE, Aperture priority AE, Manual exposure, Bulb exposure, Custom, Movie
- Exposure metering: Full aperture TTL, 63 zones iFCL SPC
- Metering modes: Evaluative, Partial, Spot, Centre-weighted Average

Flash
- Flash: E-TTL II auto-pop-up built-in / External
- Flash bracketing: N/A

Shutter
- Shutter: Electronic focal-plane
- Shutter speed range: 1/8000 sec. - 30 sec. and Bulb; X-sync at 1/250 sec.
- Continuous shooting: 7.0 fps for 40 JPEG frames or for 15 raw frames

Viewfinder
- Viewfinder: Eye-level pentaprism with 98% coverage and 0.95x magnification / LCD (Live View)

Image processing
- Image processor: DIGIC 5+
- White balance: Auto, Daylight, Shade, Cloudy, Tungsten, White Fluorescent, Flash, Kelvin (2500 – 10000 K in 100 K steps)
- WB bracketing: Yes

General
- LCD screen: 3.0" (7.7 cm) Clear View II colour TFT vari-angle LCD touchscreen with 1.040.000 dots
- Battery: Li-Ion LP-E6 rechargeable (1800 mAh)
- Optional battery packs: BG-E14 grip allows the use of 6 AA cells, one LP-E6 battery or two LP-E6 batteries
- Weight: 675 g (23.8 oz) (body only)
- Made in: Japan

Chronology
- Predecessor: Canon EOS 60D
- Successor: Canon EOS 80D

The Canon EOS 70D is a digital single-lens reflex camera by Canon publicly announced on July 2, 2013, with a suggested retail price of $1,199. As a part of the Canon EOS two-digit line, it is the successor to the EOS 60D and is the predecessor of the EOS 80D.

The EOS 70D is the launch platform for Canon's Dual Pixel CMOS Autofocus, which provides great improvement in focusing speed while in Live View, both for stills and video. At large apertures such as f/1.8, the 70D's Dual Pixel CMOS Autofocus provides a significant improvement in focus accuracy and consistency over conventional autofocus.

The 70D can be purchased as a body alone, or in a package with an EF-S 18–55mm f/3.5–5.6 IS STM lens, EF-S 18–135mm f/3.5-5.6 IS STM lens, and/or EF-S 18–200mm f/3.5-5.6 IS lens.

The most recent available firmware is version 1.1.3.

== Features ==
Compared to the EOS 60D, the following changes have been made, including:

- Resolution increased to 20.2 MP CMOS Sensor (60D has 18.1 MP)
- DIGIC 5+ image processor (DIGIC 4 on 60D)
- 19-point AF System, all cross-type at f/5.6. Center point is high precision, double cross-type at f/2.8 or faster. (9 points, all cross-type on 60D)
- 98% viewfinder coverage, 0.95× magnification (96% coverage with same magnification for 60D)
- Faster continuous shooting at 7.0 fps (5.3 fps on the 60D)
- Built-in Wi-Fi (not on the 60D)
- 3.0″ vari-angle Clear View II LCD touchscreen (no touchscreen on the 60D)
- Maximum sensor sensitivity increased to ISO 12800 maximum (H: 25600 expanded) – compare to 6400 (H: 12800 expanded) on the 60D
- New Dual Pixel CMOS AF (only standard contrast-detection in live view on 60D)
  - Allows the use of high precision phase-detection autofocus in live view, functional across 80% of the frame down to 0EV and f/11
- Full HD EOS Movies
  - Digital Zoom in movie mode—offers a full HD crop from the center of the sensor for an approximate 3x zoom with no loss of image quality, plus a digitally interpolated 10x zoom (only previously available on 600D/Rebel T3i)
- AF microadjustment (was introduced on the 50D, but not present on the 60D)
  - The 70D allows microadjustment at both focal length extremes of the same zoom lens.
- HDR (not available in-camera on the 60D)
- Multi exposure Mode (not available on the 60D)
- Exposure bracketing of up to 7 frames (3 frames for the 60D)
- One SD/SDHC/SDXC card slot, supports the UHS-I bus (UHS-I support is an upgrade compared to the 60D)
- External 3.5mm stereo microphone jack
- Viewfinder level indicator. The indicator remains active in autofocus mode until the shutter is released. (In earlier Canon bodies with this feature, the indicator remains fully active only in manual focus mode; if in autofocus mode, the indicator disappears from view once the shutter button is half-pressed for autofocus.)

== Phenomenon ==
The Canon EOS 70D with certain serial numbers (within the range "00" to "22") produced the error codes 70 and 80 due to circuit board issues associated with high internal temperatures during prolonged use, notably when filming video for long periods of time. Continued use with error codes would often result in a completely dead camera due to heat-related circuit board component failure. Canon had recalled the product. Customers who experienced this phenomenon could contact Canon by registering their serial number and requesting free service/replacement, which included replacing the circuit board if needed.

This recall program was discontinued at the end of 2022.

| Type | Sensor | Class | 00 | 01 | 02 | 03 | 04 | 05 | 06 | 07 | 08 | 09 | 10 | 11 | 12 | 13 | 14 | 15 | 16 | 17 | 18 | 19 | 20 | 21 | 22 | 23 | 24 | 25 | 26 |
|---|---|---|---|---|---|---|---|---|---|---|---|---|---|---|---|---|---|---|---|---|---|---|---|---|---|---|---|---|---|
| DSLR | Full-frame | Flagship | | | | 1Ds | | 1Ds Mk II | | | 1Ds Mk III | | | | | 1D C | | | | | | | | | | | | | |
| DSLR | Full-frame | Flagship | | | | 1Ds | | 1Ds Mk II | | | 1Ds Mk III | | | | 1D X | | | | | 1D X Mk II ^{T} | | | 1D X Mk III ^{T} | | | | | | |
| DSLR | APS-H | Flagship | | | 1D | | | 1D Mk II | 1D Mk II N | | 1D Mk III | | 1D Mk IV | | | | | | | | | | | | | | | | |
| DSLR | Full-frame | Professional | | | | | | | | | | | | | | | | | 5DS / 5DS R | | | | | | | | | | |
| DSLR | Full-frame | Professional | | | | | | | 5D | | | _{x} 5D Mk II | | | _{x} 5D Mk III | | | | | 5D Mk IV ^{T} | | | | | | | | | |
| DSLR | Full-frame | Advanced | | | | | | | | | | | | | | _{x} 6D | | | | | _{x} 6D Mk II ^{AT} | | | | | | | | |
| DSLR | APS-C | Advanced | | | | | | | | | | | _{x} 7D | | | | | _{x} 7D Mk II | | | | | | | | | | | |
| DSLR | APS-C | Mid-range | | | | | | 20Da | | | | | | | | _{x} 60Da ^{A} | | | | | | | | | | | | | |
| DSLR | APS-C | Mid-range | | D30 | D60 | 10D | | 20D | 30D | | 40D | _{x} 50D | | _{x} 60D ^{A} | | | _{x} 70D ^{AT} | | 80D ^{AT} | | | | 90D ^{AT} | | | | | | |
| DSLR | APS-C | Mid-range | | | | | | | | | | | | | | | | | 760D ^{AT} | | 77D ^{AT} | | | | | | | | |
| DSLR | APS-C | Entry-level | | | | | 300D | 350D | | 400D | 450D | _{x} 500D | _{x} 550D | _{x} 600D ^{A} | | _{x} 650D ^{AT} | _{x} 700D ^{AT} | | _{x} 750D ^{AT} | | 800D ^{AT} | | | 850D ^{AT} | | | | | |
| DSLR | APS-C | Entry-level | | | | | | | | | | | | | | | _{x} 100D ^{T} | | _{x} 200D ^{AT} | | | | 250D ^{AT} | | | | | | |
| DSLR | APS-C | Entry-level | | | | | | | | | | 1000D | | _{x} 1100D | | | _{x} 1200D | | | 1300D | | 2000D | | | | | | | |
| DSLR | APS-C | Value | | | | | | | | | | | | | | | | | | | | 4000D | | | | | | | |
| Early models | | | Canon EOS DCS 5 (1995); Canon EOS DCS 3 (1995); Canon EOS DCS 1 (1995); Canon EOS D2000 (1998); Canon EOS D6000 (1998) | | | | | | | | | | | | | | | | | | | | | | | | | | |
| Type | Sensor | Spec | | | | | | | | | | | | | | | | | | | | | | | | | | | |
| Type | Sensor | Spec | 00 | 01 | 02 | 03 | 04 | 05 | 06 | 07 | 08 | 09 | 10 | 11 | 12 | 13 | 14 | 15 | 16 | 17 | 18 | 19 | 20 | 21 | 22 | 23 | 24 | 25 | 26 |
