= Canon EOS 80D =

2016 APS-C digital single-lens reflex camera

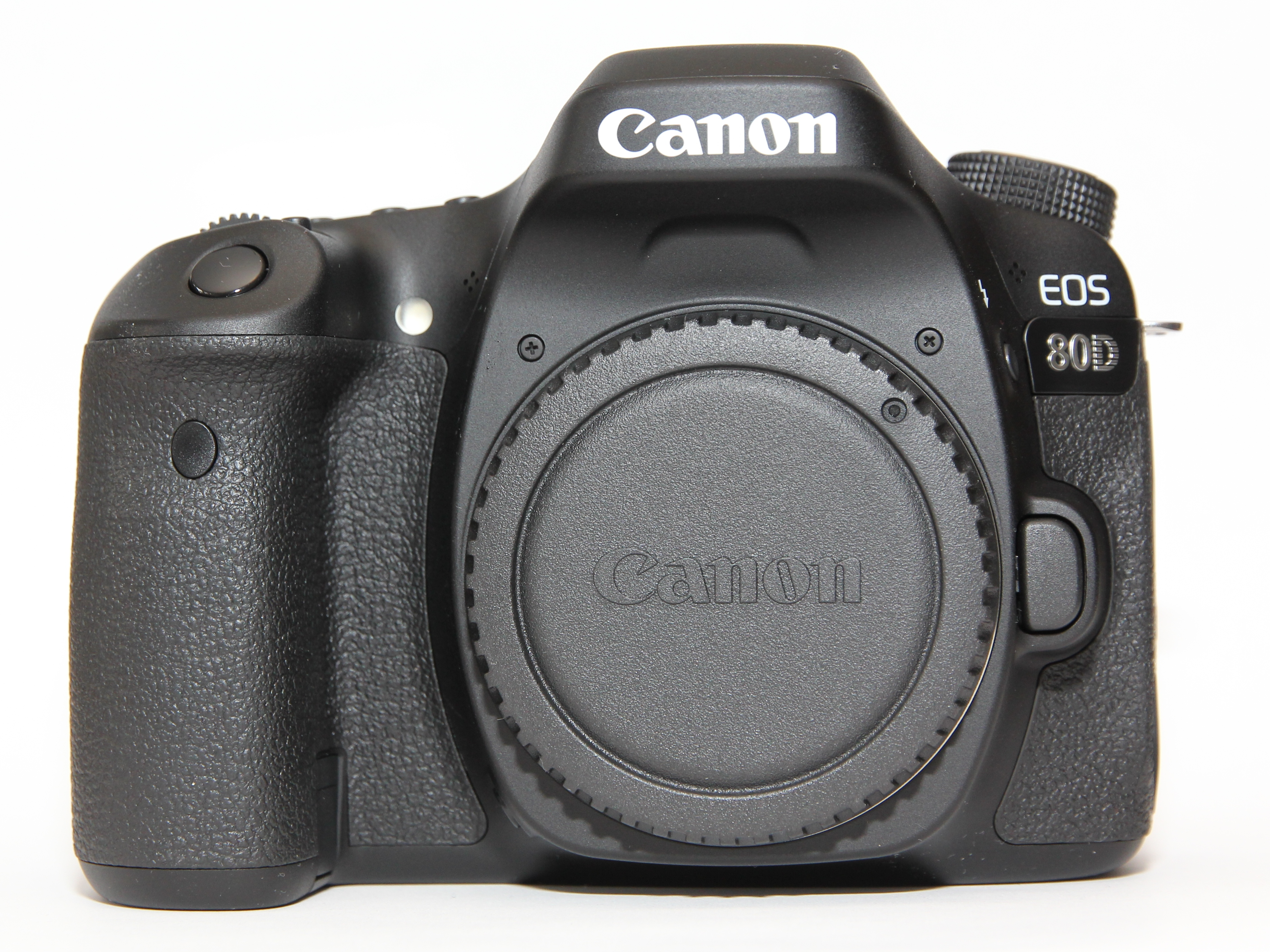

Overview
- Type: Digital single-lens reflex camera
- Released: March 2016
- Intro price: US$ 1,199.00

Lens
- Lens mount: Canon EF-S
- Lens: Interchangeable

Sensor/medium
- Sensor type: CMOS
- Sensor size: 22.3 × 14.9 mm (APS-C format)
- Maximum resolution: 6000 × 4000 pixels (3.7 μm pixel size) (approx. 24.2 effective megapixels)
- Film speed: 100 – 16000 in 1/3 stop increments (expandable up to H: 25600)
- Storage media: SD/SDHC/SDXC card (UHS-I bus supported)

Focusing
- Focus modes: One-Shot, AI Focus, AI Servo, Live View (FlexiZone - Multi, FlexiZone - Single, Face detection, Movie Servo)
- Focus areas: 45 cross-type AF points
- Focus bracketing: N/A

Exposure/metering
- Exposure modes: Scene Intelligent Auto, Flash Off, Creative Auto, Special Scene (Portrait, Landscape, Close-up, Sports, Night Portrait, Handheld Night Scene, HDR Backlight Control), Creative Filters, Program AE, Shutter priority AE, Aperture priority AE, Manual exposure, Bulb exposure, Custom (2x), Movie
- Exposure metering: TTL, full aperture, 63 zones sensor with 7560 pixels RGB + IR sensor
- Metering modes: Evaluative, Partial, Spot, Centre-weighted Average

Flash
- Flash: E-TTL II auto-pop-up built-in / External
- Flash bracketing: N/A

Shutter
- Shutter: Electronic focal-plane
- Shutter speed range: 1/8000 sec. – 30 sec., Bulb; X-sync at 1/250 sec.
- Continuous shooting: Up to 7.0 fps

Viewfinder
- Viewfinder: Optical pentaprism with 100% coverage and 0.95x magnification / LiveView LCD

Image processing
- Image processor: DIGIC 6
- White balance: Auto, Daylight, Shade, Cloudy, Tungsten, White Fluorescent, Flash, Kelvin (2500 K – 10000 K in 100 K steps)
- WB bracketing: Yes

General
- LCD screen: 3.0" (7.7 cm) Clear View II colour TFT vari-angle LCD touchscreen with 1,040,000 dots
- Battery: Li-Ion LP-E6N rechargeable (1800 mAh); 960 shots (CIPA rating)
- Optional battery packs: BG-E14 grip allows the use of 6 AA cells, one LP-E6N battery or two LP-E6N batteries
- Dimensions: 139 mm × 105.2 mm × 78.5 mm (5.47 in × 4.14 in × 3.09 in) (W × H × D)
- Weight: 650 g (23 oz) (body only)
- Made in: Japan

Chronology
- Predecessor: Canon EOS 70D
- Successor: Canon EOS 90D

The Canon EOS 80D is a digital single-lens reflex camera announced by Canon on February 18, 2016. It has the same body-only MSRP as the Canon EOS 70D, which it replaces. The camera can be purchased as a body-only, as kit with the 18-55mm IS STM lens, with the new 18-135mm IS USM lens or with the EF-S 18-200mm IS. As a part of the Canon EOS two-digit line, it is the successor to the EOS 70D and is the predecessor of the EOS 90D.

The camera is aimed at mid-market, semi-pro and enthusiast photographers.

== New features from 70D ==
Compared to the EOS 70D, several modifications were made, including:

- New 24.2-megapixel dual-pixel CMOS sensor
- 45 cross-type AF points, compared to 19 for the 70D
  - Of these points, 27 will support autofocus at f/8 when the body is attached to one of two specific lens/teleconverter combinations (the Canon 100-400 Mark II with 1.4x III or the Canon 200-400 with 2x III). Any other lens/teleconverter combinations resulting in an aperture of f/8 will only function with the center point. The 80D is the first non-professional EOS body that can autofocus in this situation; previous non-professional bodies could not autofocus if the maximum aperture of an attached lens/teleconverter combination was smaller than f/5.6.
- DIGIC 6 (DIGIC 5+ on the 70D)
- New 7560-pixel RGB+IR metering sensor to aid the AF system
- New shutter mechanism to help reduce vibrations and camera shake
- "Anti-flicker" (introduced on EOS 7D Mk II) – shutter release can be set to compensate for flickering electric lighting
- 100% scene coverage viewfinder
- Built-in NFC
- 1080p at 60/50 fps video recording capability
- Built-in HDR and time-lapse recording capability (new software)
- Better low-light AF battery life, from 920 shots per battery to 960 shots per battery
- External 3.5 mm stereo headphone jack

Type	Sensor	Class	00	01	02	03	04	05	06	07	08	09	10	11	12	13	14	15	16	17	18	19	20	21	22	23	24	25
DSLR	Full-frame	Flagship				1Ds		1Ds Mk II			1Ds Mk III					1D C												
DSLR	Full-frame	Flagship				1Ds		1Ds Mk II			1Ds Mk III				1D X					1D X Mk II ^{T}			1D X Mk III ^{T}					
DSLR	APS-H	Flagship			1D			1D Mk II	1D Mk II N		1D Mk III		1D Mk IV															
DSLR	Full-frame	Professional																	5DS / 5DS R									
DSLR	Full-frame	Professional							5D			_{x} 5D Mk II			_{x} 5D Mk III					5D Mk IV ^{T}								
DSLR	Full-frame	Advanced														_{x} 6D					_{x} 6D Mk II ^{AT}							
DSLR	APS-C	Advanced											_{x} 7D					_{x} 7D Mk II										
DSLR	APS-C	Mid-range						20Da								_{x} 60Da ^{A}												
DSLR	APS-C	Mid-range		D30	D60	10D		20D	30D		40D	_{x} 50D		_{x} 60D ^{A}		_{x} 70D ^{AT}		80D ^{AT}					90D ^{AT}					
DSLR	APS-C	Mid-range																	760D ^{AT}		77D ^{AT}							
DSLR	APS-C	Entry-level					300D	350D		400D	450D	_{x} 500D	_{x} 550D	_{x} 600D ^{A}		_{x} 650D ^{AT}	_{x} 700D ^{AT}		_{x} 750D ^{AT}		800D ^{AT}			850D ^{AT}				
DSLR	APS-C	Entry-level															_{x} 100D ^{T}		_{x} 200D ^{AT}				250D ^{AT}					
DSLR	APS-C	Entry-level										1000D		_{x} 1100D			_{x} 1200D			1300D		2000D						
DSLR	APS-C	Value																				4000D						
Early models			Canon EOS DCS 5 (1995); Canon EOS DCS 3 (1995); Canon EOS DCS 1 (1995); Canon EOS D2000 (1998); Canon EOS D6000 (1998)																									
Type	Sensor	Spec																										
Type	Sensor	Spec	00	01	02	03	04	05	06	07	08	09	10	11	12	13	14	15	16	17	18	19	20	21	22	23	24	25
