= SRAW =

SRAW may refer to:

- Canon sRAW, digital camera "small RAW" file format introduced on the Canon EOS 40D camera
- FGM-172 SRAW Short-Range Assault Weapon
- Specific airway resistance (sR_{aw})
