= Canon EOS 60D =

2010 APS-C digital single-lens reflex camera

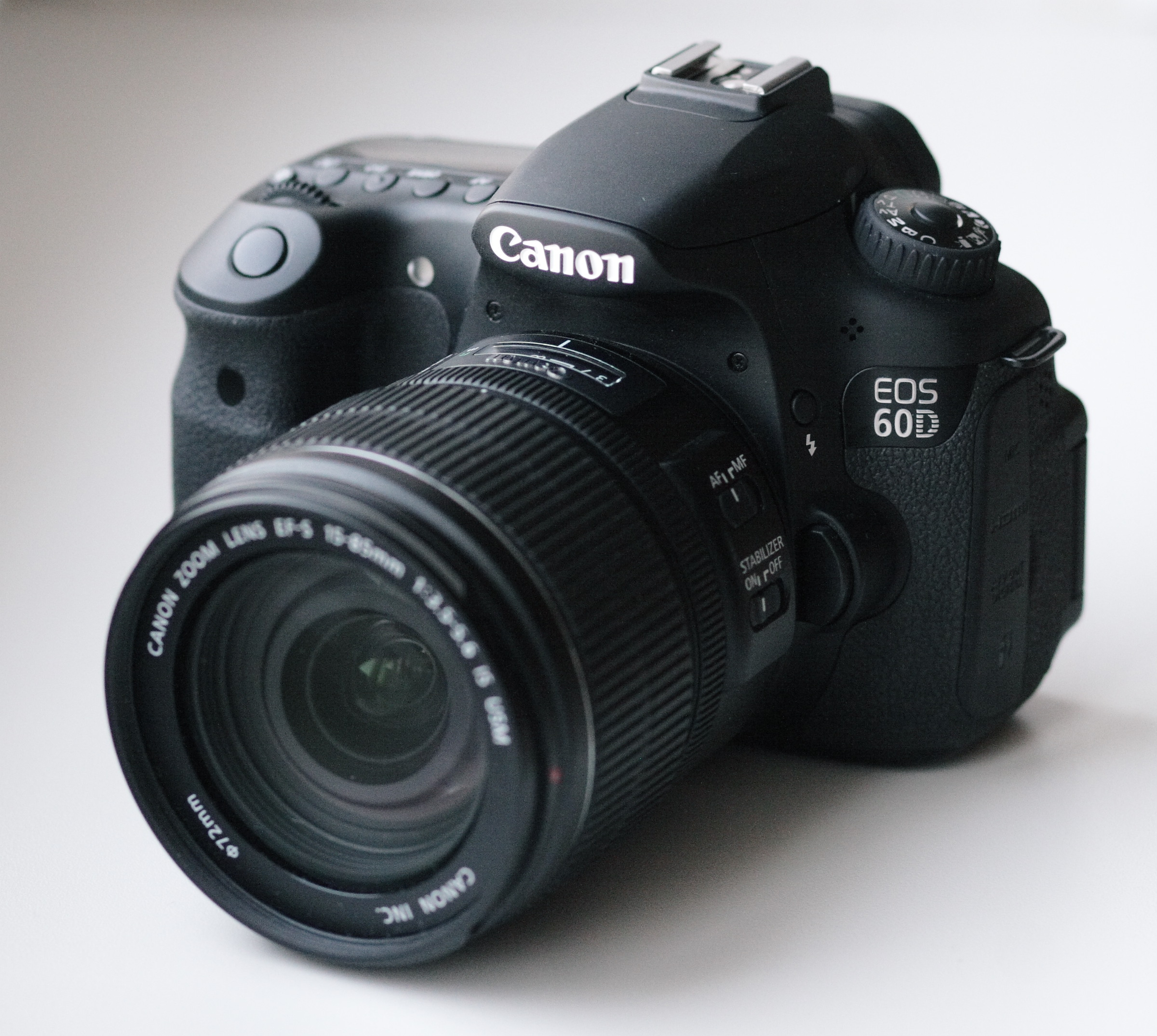

Overview
- Maker: Canon Inc.
- Type: Digital single-lens reflex camera
- Intro price: US$1099.00

Lens
- Lens mount: Canon EF-S
- Lens: Interchangeable

Sensor/medium
- Sensor type: CMOS
- Sensor size: 22.3 × 14.9 mm (APS-C format)
- Maximum resolution: 5184 × 3456 pixels (4.3 μm pixel size) (18.1 effective megapixels)
- Film speed: 100 – 6400 (expandable to H: 12800)
- Storage media: SD/SDHC/SDXC (Does not exploit UHS-I bus)

Focusing
- Focus modes: One-Shot, AI Focus, AI Servo, Live View (FlexiZone - Multi, FlexiZone - Single, Face detection, AF Quick)
- Focus areas: 9 cross-type AF points

Exposure/metering
- Exposure modes: Full Auto, Flash Off, Creative Auto, Portrait, Landscape, Close-up, Sports, Night Portrait, Program AE, Shutter priority AE, Aperture priority AE, Manual exposure, Bulb exposure, Custom, Movie
- Exposure metering: Full aperture TTL, 63 zones iFCL SPC
- Metering modes: Evaluative, Partial, Spot, Centre-weighted Average

Flash
- Flash: E-TTL II auto-pop-up built-in / External
- Flash bracketing: N/A

Shutter
- Shutter: Electronic focal-plane
- Shutter speed range: 1/8000 sec. – 30 sec. and Bulb; X-sync at 1/250 sec.
- Continuous shooting: Up to 5.3 fps

Viewfinder
- Viewfinder: Eye-level pentaprism with 96% coverage and 0.95x magnification

Image processing
- Image processor: DIGIC 4
- White balance: Auto, Daylight, Shade, Cloudy, Tungsten, White Fluorescent, Flash, Custom, Kelvin (2500 - 10000K in 100K steps)

General
- LCD screen: Fully articulating 3.0" (7.7 cm) Clear View II colour LCD screen with 1,040,000 dots resolution
- Battery: Li-Ion LP-E6 rechargeable (1800 mAh)
- Optional battery packs: BG-E9 grip allows the use of 6 AA cells, one LP-E6 battery or two LP-E6 batteries
- Dimensions: 144.5 mm × 105.8 mm × 78.6 mm (5.69 in × 4.17 in × 3.09 in)
- Weight: 755 g (26.6 oz)
- Made in: Japan

Chronology
- Predecessor: Canon EOS 50D
- Successor: Canon EOS 70D

The Canon EOS 60D is an 18.1 megapixels semi-pro digital single-lens reflex camera made by Canon. It was announced on August 26, 2010, with a suggested retail price of US$1099.00. As a part of the Canon EOS two-digit line, it is the successor of the EOS 50D and is the predecessor of the EOS 70D.

It is the first Canon EOS camera which has an articulating LCD screen. Apart from its screen, the main new features of the 60D in the two-digit Canon line include increased resolution and ISO range, full-HD video capabilities, and in-camera post-processing functions for the images. It uses the DIGIC 4 image processor.

Like the 50D, the camera has an LCD of settings on the top of the camera where the ISO, AF-Mode, Shooting mode, and metering mode can be controlled.

The 60D was offered for purchase as a body alone or in a package with an EF-S 18-200mm f/3.5-5.6 IS lens, EF-S 17–85mm f/4-5.6 IS USM lens, EF-S 18–135mm f/3.5-5.6 IS lens, EF-S 17-55mm f/2.8 IS USM lens, or an EF-S 18–55mm f/3.5–5.6 lens.

== Features ==
Compared to the EOS 50D, the following changes have been made, including:

- Resolution increase to 18.1 megapixels APS-C CMOS Sensor (50D has 15.1 megapixels).
- Maximum sensitivity increased to ISO 6400 (12800 as optional expanded setting) (50D has max 3200 ISO, with 6400 and 12800 as optional expanded settings).
- Video recording, with same controls as the 550D/Rebel T2i.
  - 1080p Full HD video recording at 24p, 25p and 30p with drop frame timing.
  - 720p HD video recording at 50p (50 Hz) and 60p (59.94 Hz).
  - 480p ED video recording at 50p (50 Hz) and 60p (59.94 Hz).
- Manual control of audio recording (same as newer firmware on 5D MkII).
- Articulating screen - 3.0 inches (76 mm) with a slightly higher resolution of 1,040,000 pixels, 288 ppi, in 3:2 ratio (50D has 4:3). (Note: Canon counts the sub-pixels of each pixel, i.e. the red, green, and blue channel of each pixel, and therefore specifies the rear display to have 345,600 × 3 = 1,036,800 or ca. 1,040,000 dots.)
  - The 60D screen, unlike that of the 50D, matches the aspect ratio of the sensor.
- Lower maximum burst frame rate of 5.3 fps (50D maximum is 6.3 fps).
- SD/SDHC/SDXC card slot (50D uses CompactFlash).
- Smaller and lighter polycarbonate resin with glass fibre on aluminium chassis (50D has magnesium alloy body).
- Wireless Speedlite control.
- Lack of AF micro-adjustment feature (included in 50D).
- Redesign of controls – multi-controller has been relocated to center of quick control dial; top buttons of 60D control only one setting.
- Locking mode dial.
- Electronic level that can be viewed in the viewfinder, rear LCD monitor, and top LCD panel.
- LP-E6 battery, as used in the 5D MkII and 7D.
- Lack of PC socket for flash synchronization.
- External shutter release port changed from 'Canon N3' socket to 3/32" (2.5mm) TRS pin.
- In-camera raw development and built-in creative filters and special effects.
- External 3.5mm stereo microphone jack

Digital Photography Review described the changes as representing the move from 'semi-pro'/'prosumer' to 'enthusiast' due to the reduction in some features; however the pentaprism viewfinder and iconic rear control wheel remain, as does the top informational LCD. The slightly smaller body retains the grip of the two-digit Canon line.

== Gallery ==
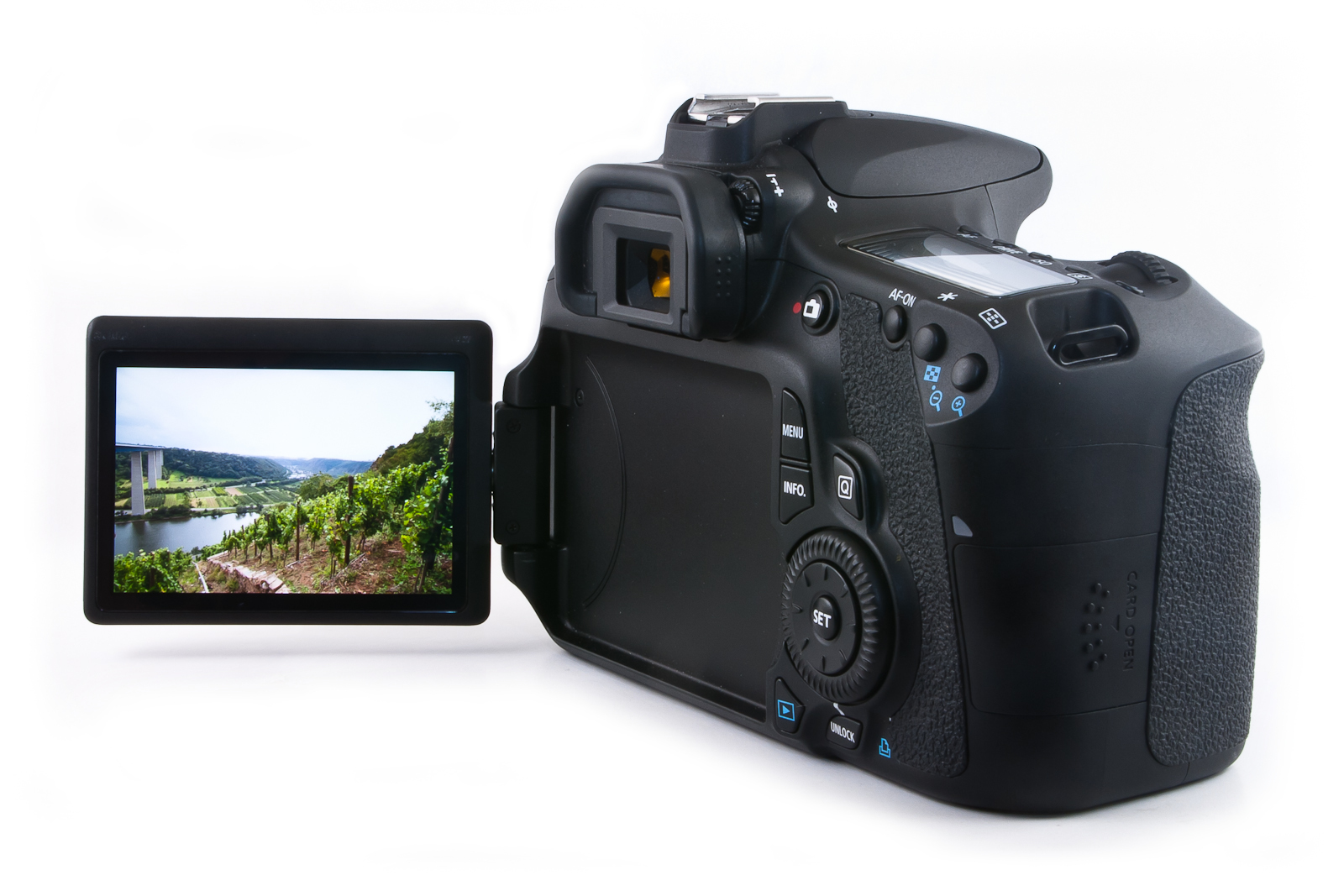
The articulated display

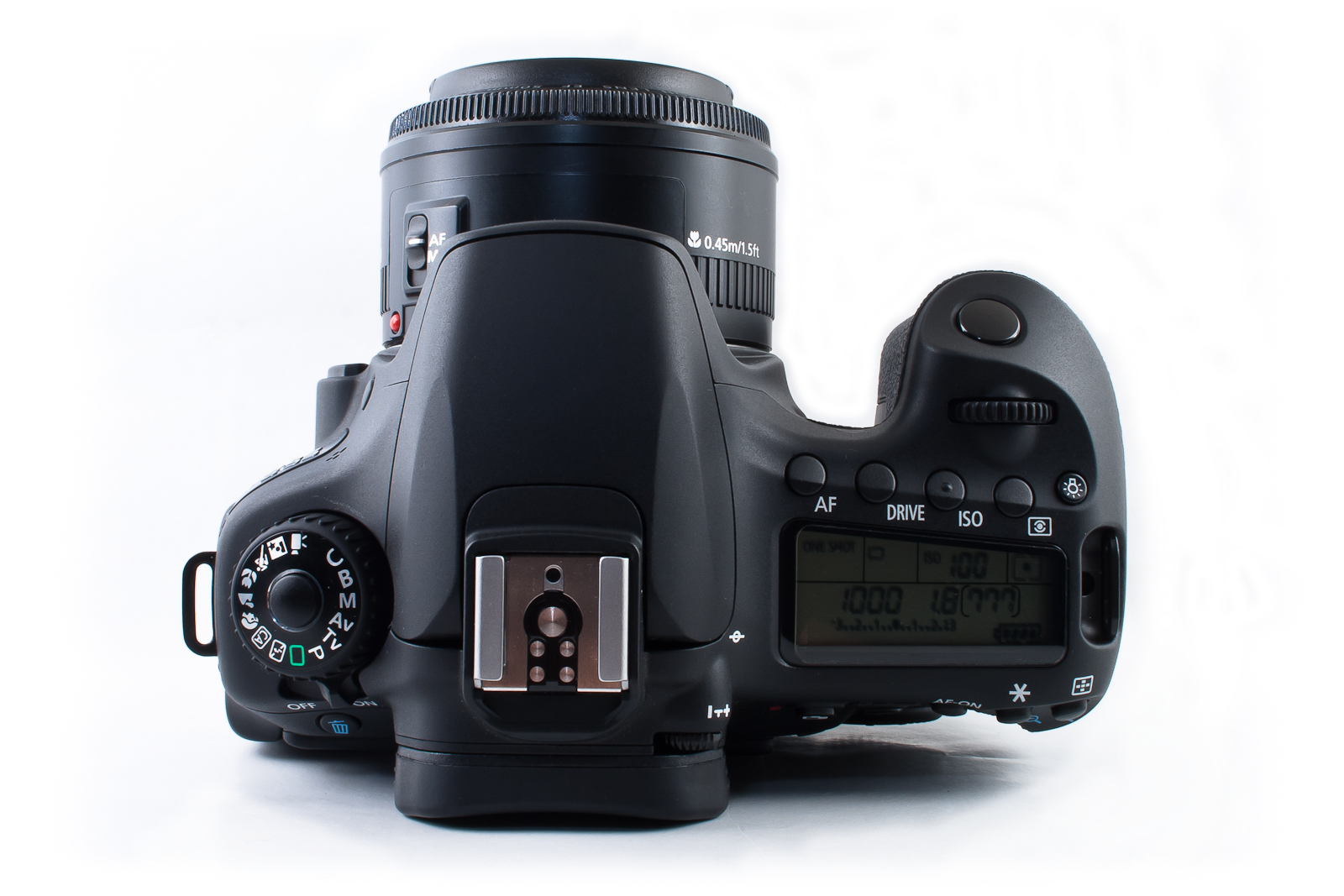
Top view

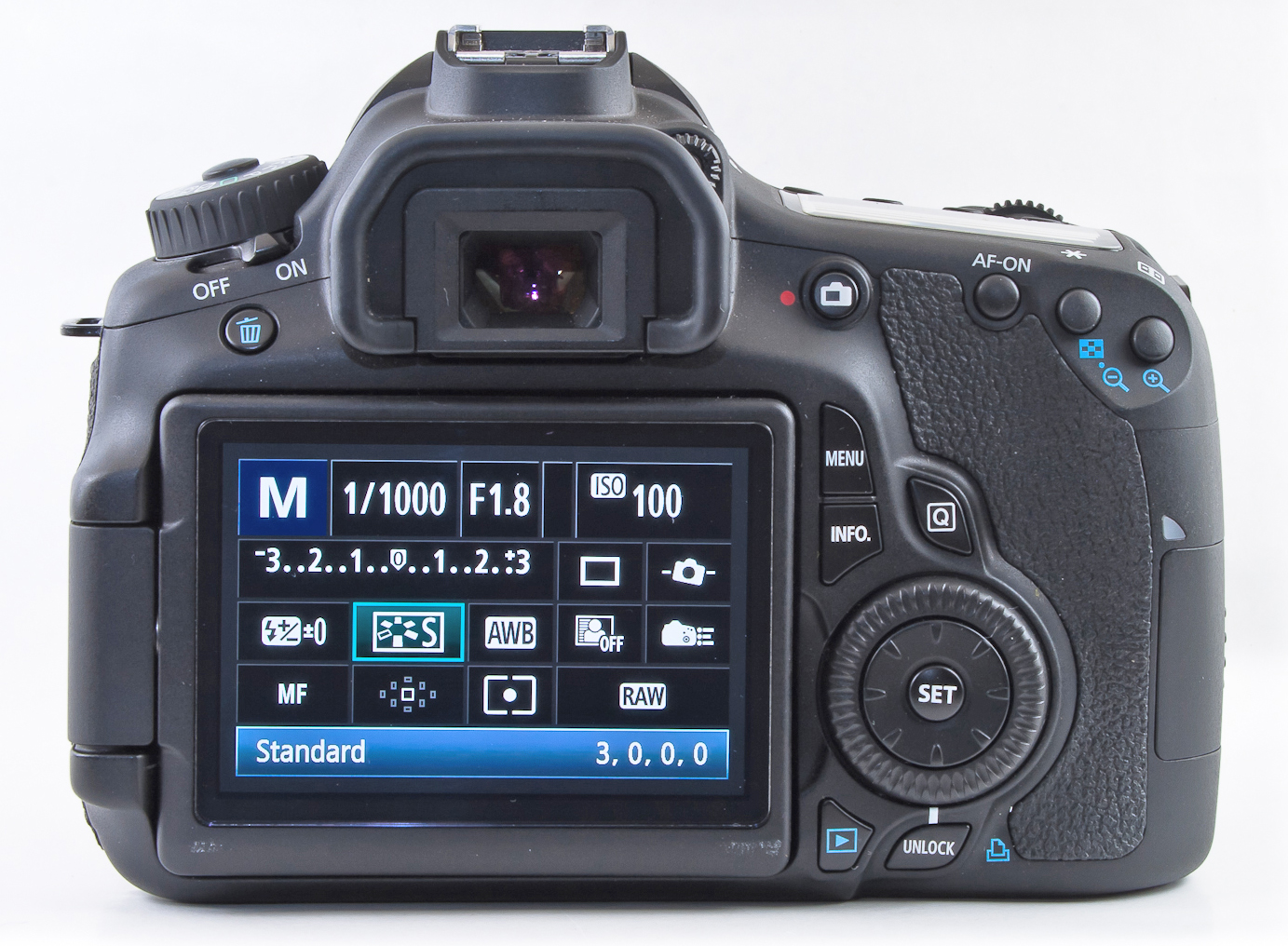
Back view

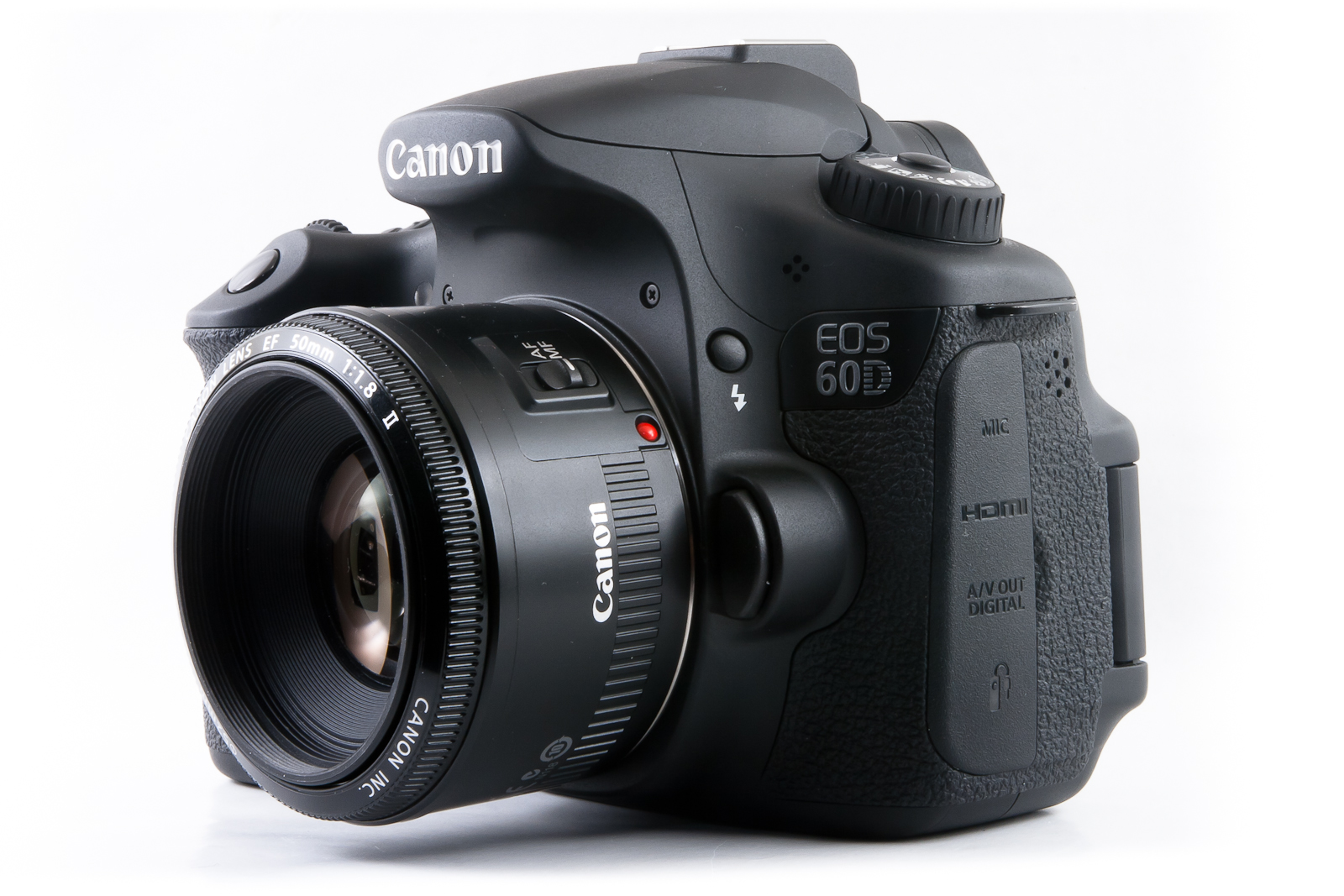
60D with mounted 50mm f/1.8 II

== EOS 60Da ==
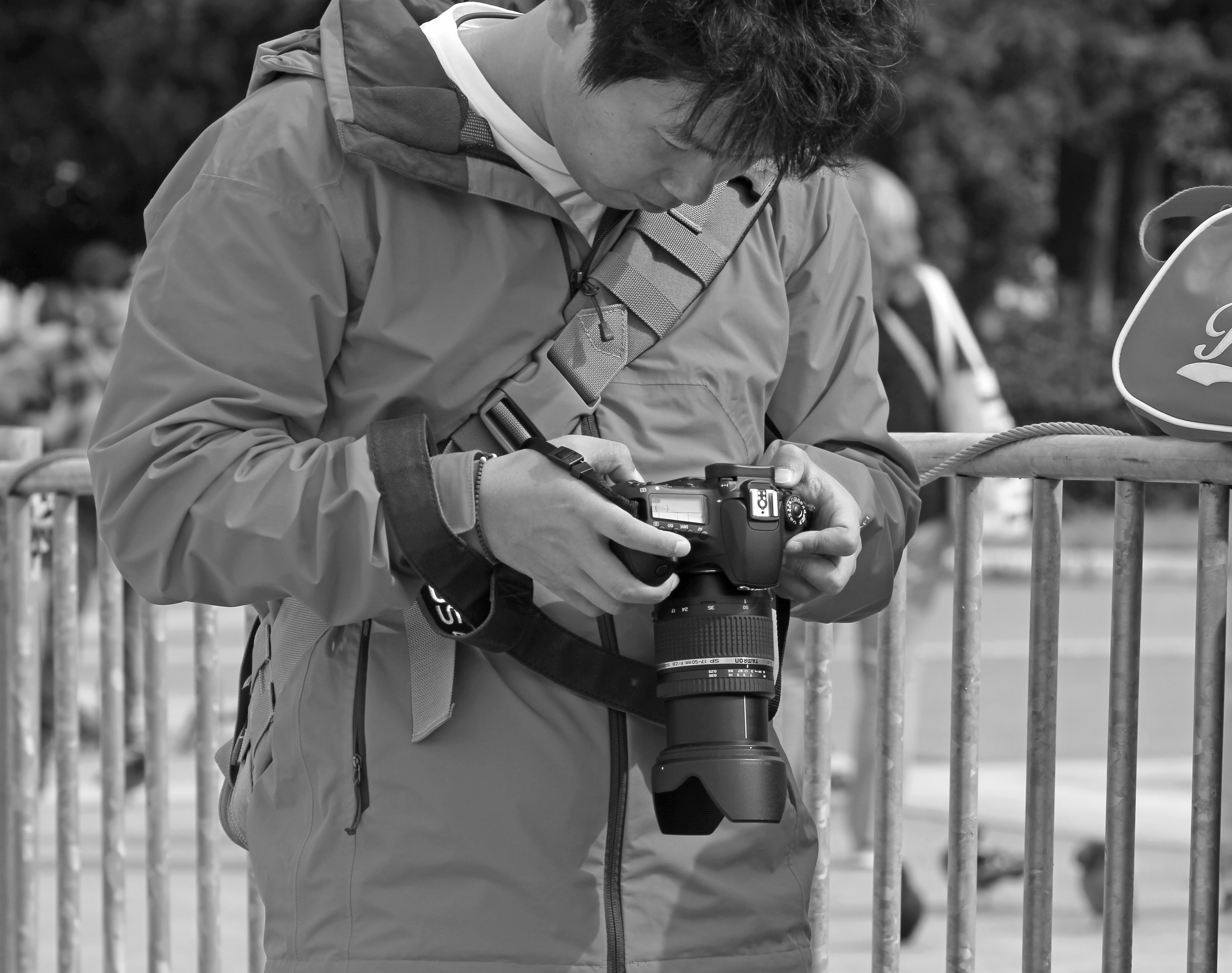
The LCD screen of the Canon EOS 60D allows quick review of taken pictures or of the camera settings

Canon announced a modified version of the EOS 60D for astrophotography on April 3, 2012, called the EOS 60Da. The 60Da is the successor to the EOS 20Da. It was expected to cost $1,499. The camera has a modified infrared filter and a low-noise sensor with heightened hydrogen-alpha (H-alpha) sensitivity for improved capture of red hydrogen emission nebulae. The 60Da is three times as sensitive to H-alpha light as the 60D to allow for better images of nebulae.

== Notes ==
Type	Sensor	Class	00	01	02	03	04	05	06	07	08	09	10	11	12	13	14	15	16	17	18	19	20	21	22	23	24	25
DSLR	Full-frame	Flagship				1Ds		1Ds Mk II			1Ds Mk III					1D C												
DSLR	Full-frame	Flagship				1Ds		1Ds Mk II			1Ds Mk III				1D X					1D X Mk II ^{T}			1D X Mk III ^{T}					
DSLR	APS-H	Flagship			1D			1D Mk II	1D Mk II N		1D Mk III		1D Mk IV															
DSLR	Full-frame	Professional																	5DS / 5DS R									
DSLR	Full-frame	Professional							5D			_{x} 5D Mk II			_{x} 5D Mk III					5D Mk IV ^{T}								
DSLR	Full-frame	Advanced														_{x} 6D					_{x} 6D Mk II ^{AT}							
DSLR	APS-C	Advanced											_{x} 7D					_{x} 7D Mk II										
DSLR	APS-C	Mid-range						20Da								_{x} 60Da ^{A}												
DSLR	APS-C	Mid-range		D30	D60	10D		20D	30D		40D	_{x} 50D		_{x} 60D ^{A}		_{x} 70D ^{AT}		80D ^{AT}					90D ^{AT}					
DSLR	APS-C	Mid-range																	760D ^{AT}		77D ^{AT}							
DSLR	APS-C	Entry-level					300D	350D		400D	450D	_{x} 500D	_{x} 550D	_{x} 600D ^{A}		_{x} 650D ^{AT}	_{x} 700D ^{AT}		_{x} 750D ^{AT}		800D ^{AT}			850D ^{AT}				
DSLR	APS-C	Entry-level															_{x} 100D ^{T}		_{x} 200D ^{AT}				250D ^{AT}					
DSLR	APS-C	Entry-level										1000D		_{x} 1100D			_{x} 1200D			1300D		2000D						
DSLR	APS-C	Value																				4000D						
Early models			Canon EOS DCS 5 (1995); Canon EOS DCS 3 (1995); Canon EOS DCS 1 (1995); Canon EOS D2000 (1998); Canon EOS D6000 (1998)																									
Type	Sensor	Spec																										
Type	Sensor	Spec	00	01	02	03	04	05	06	07	08	09	10	11	12	13	14	15	16	17	18	19	20	21	22	23	24	25
