= Canon EF-S 18–135mm lens =

Canon DSLR EF-S-mount zoom lens

The Canon EF-S 18–135mm lens is a standard to short telephoto telezoom for Canon digital single-lens reflex cameras with an EF-S lens mount. The field of view has a 35 mm equivalent focal length of 29–216mm. With its 7.5× zoom range, it is placed into the superzoom category. Canon offers further lenses with even higher zoom ranges, such as the EF-S 18–200mm lens (11× zoom range).

== Canon EF-S 18–135mm f/3.5–5.6 IS ==
The original version of the lens, the f/3.5–5.6 IS, was introduced in 2009 with a suggested retail price of US$499.99. It is the standard kit lens for the Canon EOS 60D and EOS 7D, and is an alternative kit lens in some markets for the EOS 600D/Rebel T3i.

== Canon EF-S 18–135mm f/3.5–5.6 IS STM ==
A new version of the lens, the f/3.5–5.6 IS STM, was announced on 8 June 2012, alongside the EOS 650D/Rebel T4i/Kiss X6i. The "STM" stands for "Stepping Motor", a new autofocus technology claimed by Canon "to smoothly and silently focus" and "achieve continuous AF while recording video" when used with the 650D (and presumably future Canon bodies). Its suggested retail price was US$549.99 at introduction. It was an alternative kit lens for the 650D, and is now an alternative kit lens for the 650D's successor, the EOS 700D/Rebel T5i.

This STM version, in some markets, is available as a kit lens for the Canon EOS 70D, as is also the Canon EF-S 18–55mm lens in its STM version.

== Canon EF-S 18–135mm f/3.5–5.6 IS USM ==
The latest addition of the 18–135 series is the EF-S f/3.5-5.6 IS USM, announced on 17 February 2016. New features are the new Nano USM and the possibility to connect the Power Zoom Adapter PZ-E1, which allows a soft zoom for video. The lens is also available as bundle with the Canon EOS 77D and 80D, which was announced same date.

== Specifications ==
Attribute	f/3.5–5.6 IS	f/3.5–5.6 IS STM	f/3.5–5.6 IS USM
Image			
Key features
Full-frame compatible	No		
Image stabilizer	Yes (4 stops)		
Environmental sealing	No		
Ultrasonic Motor	No		Yes
Stepping Motor	No	Yes	No
L-series	No		
Diffractive Optics	No		
Macro	No		
Zoom Lock Lever	No	Yes	
Technical data
Maximum Aperture	f/3.5-5.6		
Minimum Aperture	f/22-38		
Construction	12 groups / 16 elements		
# of diaphragm blades	6	7	
Closest focusing distance	0.45 m (1.5 ft)	0.39 m (1.3 ft)	
Max. magnification	0.21×	0.28×	
Horizontal viewing angle	64°30'–9°30'		
Diagonal viewing angle	74°20'–11°30'		
Vertical viewing angle	45°30'–6°20'		
Physical data
Weight	455 g (16.0 oz)	480 g (17 oz)	515 g (18.2 oz)
Maximum diameter	75.4 mm (3.0")	77 mm (3.0")	77.4 mm (3.1")
Length	101 mm (4.0")	96 mm (3.8")	
Filter diameter	67mm		
Accessories
Lens hood	EW-73B		EW-73D
Retail information
Release date	September 2009	June 2012	March 2016
Currently in production?	No		Yes
MSRP US$	$499.00	$549.00	$599.00
