= Canon EOS 30D =

2006 APS-C digital single-lens reflex camera

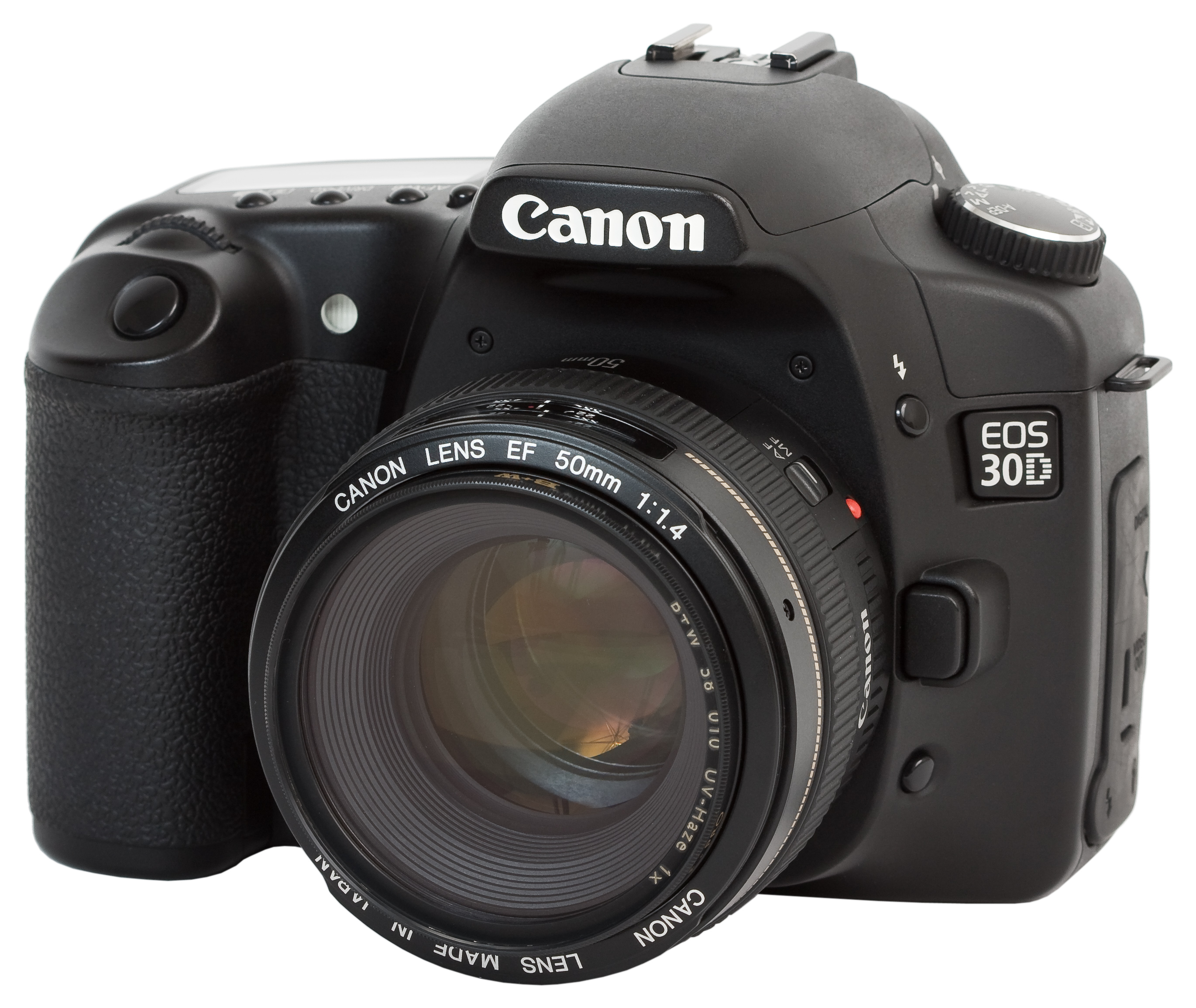

Overview
- Maker: Canon Inc.
- Type: Digital Single-lens reflex

Lens
- Lens mount: Canon EF-S
- Lens: Interchangeable

Sensor/medium
- Sensor: 22.5 mm x 15.0 mm CMOS
- Maximum resolution: 3,504 × 2,336 (8.2 megapixels)
- Film speed: 100-3200 in 1/3 EV steps
- Storage media: CompactFlash (CF) (Type I or Type II) and Microdrive / max 32GB

Focusing
- Focus modes: One-shot, AI Servo, AI-Focus, Manual
- Focus areas: 9 user points
- Focus bracketing: none

Exposure/metering
- Exposure modes: Full auto, programmed, shutter-priority, aperture priority, manual
- Exposure metering: TTL, full aperture, zones
- Metering modes: Evaluative, Partial, Spot, C/Wgt Average

Flash
- Flash: pop-up, sync at 1/250 second
- Flash bracketing: none

Shutter
- Shutter: electronic focal-plane
- Shutter speed range: 30 s to 1/8000 s
- Continuous shooting: up to 5.0 frames/s

Viewfinder
- Viewfinder: Optical

Image processing
- Image processor: DIGIC 2
- White balance: 6 presets, Auto, custom, and WB by colour temperature 2800–10000 kelvins, 100 K steps
- WB bracketing: 3 images, +/-3 levels

General
- LCD screen: 2.5 in (63 mm), 230,000 pixels
- Battery: Li-Ion BP-511A rechargeable
- Optional battery packs: BP-511A, BP-514, BP-511, BP-512. BG-E2 grip allows use of AA batteries.
- Dimensions: 144×105.5×73.5 mm (5.67×4.15×2.89 in)
- Weight: 700 g (25 oz) (body only)
- Made in: Japan

Chronology
- Predecessor: Canon EOS 20D
- Successor: Canon EOS 40D

The Canon EOS 30D is an 8.2-megapixel semi-professional digital single-lens reflex camera, initially announced on February 21, 2006. It is the successor of the Canon EOS 20D, and is succeeded by the EOS 40D. It can accept EF and EF-S lenses, and like its predecessor, it uses an APS-C sized image sensor, so it does not require the larger imaging circle necessary for 35 mm film and 'full-frame' digital cameras.

== Improvements ==
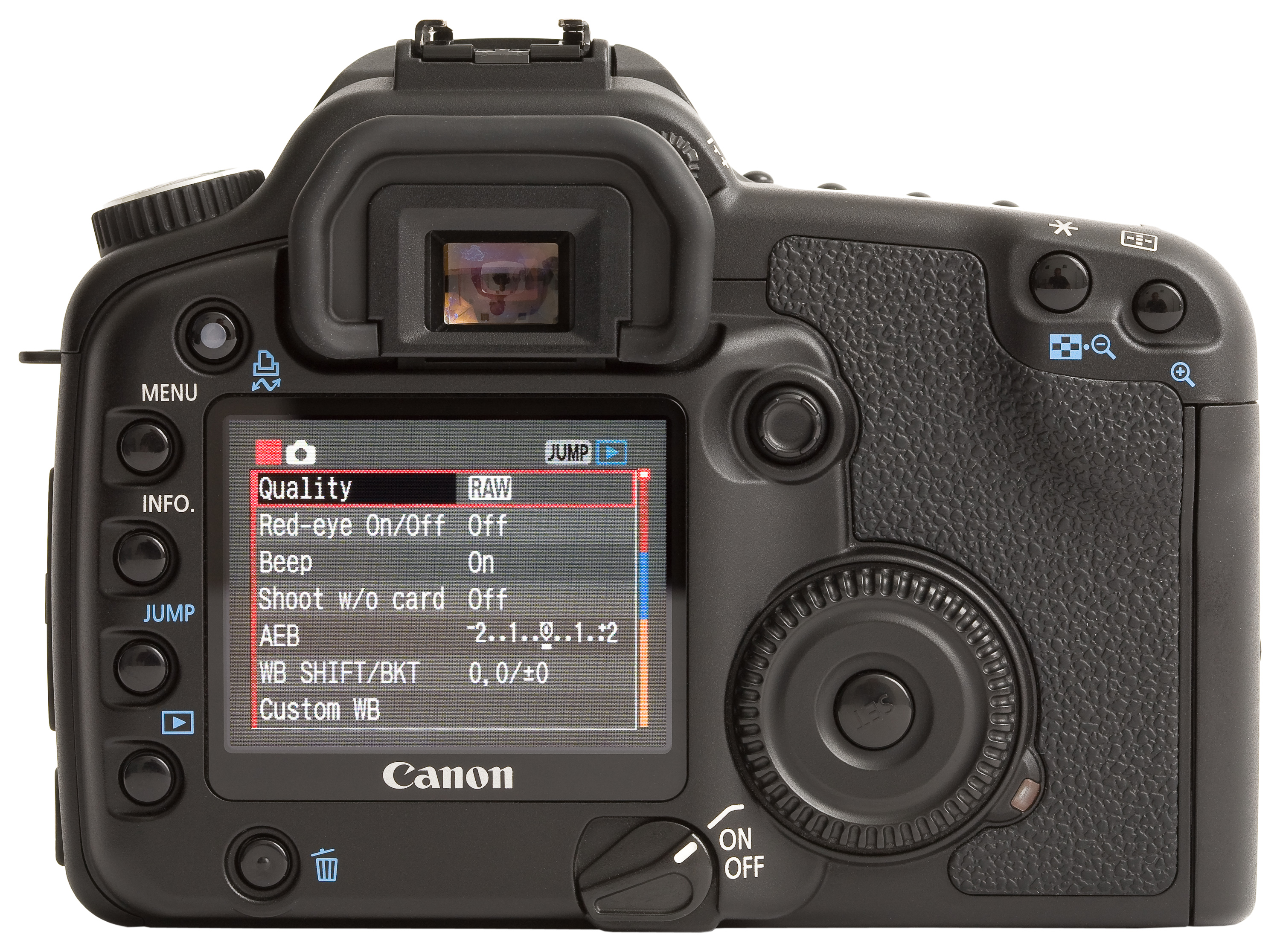
Back of the Canon EOS 30D camera

Changes over the 20D include a bigger 2.5-inch (64 mm) LCD rear screen, improved shutter mechanism rated for 100,000 actuations, improved frame capacity, 1/3 stop increments for sensor speed and an added spot meter. This unit retains the same sensor as its predecessor; all lenses still have an angle of view crop of 1.6. Other changes include a larger 11 frame RAW / 30 frame JPEG buffer, and slightly faster 0.15 second startup. The maximum frame rate is the same (5 frame/s), but a lower-speed 3 frame/s option has been added. The 30D uses the same number of autofocus points as the 20D (nine), but has improved algorithms. The 30D's file numbering system holds 9,999 images to one folder, which was introduced with the 5D.

The EOS 30D can also accept the Canon Wireless File Transmitter WFT-E1/E1A for fast file transfer to a remote file server, either through an Ethernet cable or a Wi-Fi network. This capability expands the EOS 30D's range of applications to sports and studio set ups where real-time transfer of the images is crucial.

== Resolution ==
The Canon EOS 30D has several resolution settings:

- Raw CR2 format (3504 x 2336)
- Large/Fine (3504 x 2336)
- Large/Normal (3504 x 2336)
- Middle/Fine (2544 x 1696)
- Middle/Normal (2544 x 1696)
- Small/Fine (1728 x 1152)
- Small/Normal (1728 x 1152)
- (There are also six resolution settings for JPEG+Raw which are the same as the first six but which also attach a Raw file in a separate .cr2 file).

== Features ==
The Canon EOS 30D features a Mode Dial on the top which selects the shooting mode. It is divided into two sections: Creative Zone and Basic Zone. The Creative zone provides manual and semi-manual modes; it gives access to RAW format, manual exposure, aperture and ISO sensitivity.

=== Creative Zone ===
- A-DEP: The camera automatically selects the aperture and shutter speed to keep most of the image in focus. (Only recommended in high light conditions as the camera tends to choose smaller f/stops)
- M (Manual): The camera lets you choose manually the aperture and shutter speed.
- Av (Aperture priority): The camera lets the user choose the aperture (f/) value and then automatically adjusts the shutter speed for correct exposure.
- Tv (Shutter speed priority): The camera lets the user set the shutter speed and automatically sets the aperture for correct exposure.
- P (Program AE): The camera automatically chooses an aperture and shutter combination for correct exposure and the user can change between one of these combinations.

=== Basic Zone ===
- Auto (represented with a green rectangle): Completely automatic shooting.
- Portrait: The camera attempts to create a more shallow depth of field to create more striking portraits.
- Landscape: For shooting landscapes and sunsets.
- Close-Up: For shooting small objects near to the camera.
- Sports: For capturing fast moving objects.
- Night Scene: Shoots with flash and with slow shutter so that the subject is illuminated by the flash and the background (e.g. a city) is also captured naturally in the night.
- No Flash: All automatic with no flash.

The camera features (like many others) two LCDs, one monochrome at the top, which contains all information pertinent to shooting, and a full-color one at the back, which is used for picture reviewing and menu navigation. The rear display has a resolution of 320 × 240 pixel (76,800 pixels).

The Canon EOS 30D also features a large dial on its back which is used for fast scrolling over the stored pictures or over the settings in the menu. The JUMP button can also be used to reach sections of the menu easily, as well as scroll through either 10 or 100 image in playback mode. The 8 way controller above the dial is used to select one of the 9 AF points, to move around a zoomed image in playback mode, and to set custom white balance.

Its internal flash can be set to release several consecutive strobe bursts to aid focusing in dim situations, but there is no dedicated AF assist lamp. Photographers can attach an external flash with AF assist lamp like many of Canon Speedlites.

== See also ==
- Canon EOS
- Canon EF lens mount
- Canon EF-S lens mount

Type	Sensor	Class	00	01	02	03	04	05	06	07	08	09	10	11	12	13	14	15	16	17	18	19	20	21	22	23	24	25	26
DSLR	Full-frame	Flagship				1Ds		1Ds Mk II			1Ds Mk III					1D C													
DSLR	Full-frame	Flagship				1Ds		1Ds Mk II			1Ds Mk III				1D X					1D X Mk II ^{T}			1D X Mk III ^{T}						
DSLR	APS-H	Flagship			1D			1D Mk II	1D Mk II N		1D Mk III		1D Mk IV																
DSLR	Full-frame	Professional																	5DS / 5DS R										
DSLR	Full-frame	Professional							5D			_{x} 5D Mk II			_{x} 5D Mk III					5D Mk IV ^{T}									
DSLR	Full-frame	Advanced														_{x} 6D					_{x} 6D Mk II ^{AT}								
DSLR	APS-C	Advanced											_{x} 7D					_{x} 7D Mk II											
DSLR	APS-C	Mid-range						20Da								_{x} 60Da ^{A}													
DSLR	APS-C	Mid-range		D30	D60	10D		20D	30D		40D	_{x} 50D		_{x} 60D ^{A}			_{x} 70D ^{AT}		80D ^{AT}				90D ^{AT}						
DSLR	APS-C	Mid-range																	760D ^{AT}		77D ^{AT}								
DSLR	APS-C	Entry-level					300D	350D		400D	450D	_{x} 500D	_{x} 550D	_{x} 600D ^{A}		_{x} 650D ^{AT}	_{x} 700D ^{AT}		_{x} 750D ^{AT}		800D ^{AT}			850D ^{AT}					
DSLR	APS-C	Entry-level															_{x} 100D ^{T}		_{x} 200D ^{AT}				250D ^{AT}						
DSLR	APS-C	Entry-level										1000D		_{x} 1100D			_{x} 1200D			1300D		2000D							
DSLR	APS-C	Value																				4000D							
Early models			Canon EOS DCS 5 (1995); Canon EOS DCS 3 (1995); Canon EOS DCS 1 (1995); Canon EOS D2000 (1998); Canon EOS D6000 (1998)																										
Type	Sensor	Spec																											
Type	Sensor	Spec	00	01	02	03	04	05	06	07	08	09	10	11	12	13	14	15	16	17	18	19	20	21	22	23	24	25	26
