= Canon EOS 50D =

2008 APS-C digital single-lens reflex camera

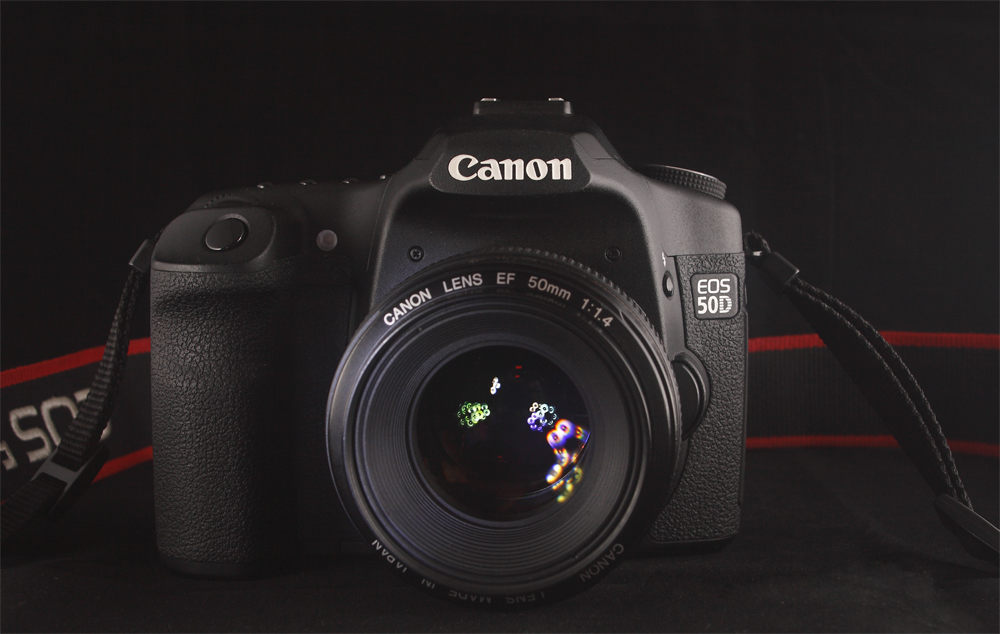

Overview
- Maker: Canon Inc.
- Type: Digital Single-lens reflex

Lens
- Lens mount: Canon EF-S
- Lens: Interchangeable

Sensor/medium
- Sensor: 22.3 × 14.9 mm CMOS (1.6x conversion factor)
- Maximum resolution: 4752 × 3168 (15.1 megapixels)
- Film speed: 100–3200 in 1/3 EV steps; 6400 and 12800 expansion available
- Storage media: CompactFlash (CF) (Type I or Type II) and Microdrive (max 32 GB)

Focusing
- Focus modes: One-shot, AI Servo, AI-Focus, Manual
- Focus areas: 9 user points (cross type)
- Focus bracketing: none

Exposure/metering
- Exposure modes: Full auto, programmed, shutter-priority, aperture priority, manual
- Exposure metering: TTL, full aperture, zones
- Metering modes: 35-area Evaluative, Partial, Spot, C/Wgt Average

Flash
- Flash: pop-up, sync at 1/250 second
- Flash bracketing: none

Shutter
- Shutter: focal-plane
- Shutter speed range: 30 s to 1/8000 s, bulb
- Continuous shooting: 3 or 6.3 frames/second

Viewfinder
- Viewfinder: Optical, pentaprism / LiveView LCD

Image processing
- Image processor: DIGIC 4
- White balance: 7 presets, Auto and custom 2000–10000 kelvins, 100 K steps
- WB bracketing: 3 images, ±9 levels

General
- LCD screen: 3.0 in (76 mm), 640 × 480 pixel (307,200 pixels; 921,600 Sub-pixels), 267 ppi
- Battery: Li-Ion BP-511A rechargeable
- Optional battery packs: BP-511A, BP-514, BP-511, BP-512. BG-E2N grip allows use of AA batteries.
- Dimensions: 146×108×74 mm (5.7×4.3×2.9 in)
- Weight: 730 g (26 oz) or 1.61 lb (body only)
- Made in: Japan

Chronology
- Predecessor: Canon EOS 40D
- Successor: Canon EOS 60D

The Canon EOS 50D is a 15.1-megapixel digital single-lens reflex camera. It is part of the Canon EOS line of cameras, succeeding the EOS 40D and preceding the EOS 60D.

Canon announced the camera on 26 August 2008. The camera was released on 6 October 2008.

== Overview and features ==
The 50D has many similar characteristics to its predecessor, the 40D. This includes various shooting modes, the ability to change ISO and white balance, a pop-up flash unit, and an LCD screen. The LCD screen is the same size (3.0") as the 40D but has a higher resolution (640 × 480 pixel or 307,200 pixels) than any previous model. It is also the final Canon xxD to use a CompactFlash or Microdrive for memory storage, along with the BP-511 series battery.

The 50D has a higher pixel count (15.1 megapixels), hence higher shooting resolutions, than its predecessor and, like the 40D, has a 14-bit raw format.

The camera has Live View, which allows photographers to use the LCD screen as the viewfinder. Because the sensor mirror needs to be in the locked position (see Live preview), shutter noise is reduced in this mode.

- 15.1 megapixel APS-C CMOS sensor
- 3.0 inch VGA LCD monitor
- LiveView mode
- Wide 9-point AF with center cross-type sensors
- Selectable AF and metering modes
- Built-in flash
- Canon EOS Integrated Cleaning System
- ISO 100–3200 (6400 and 12800 with custom function)
- Auto correction of vignetting
- Continuous Drive up to 6.3 fps (90 images (JPEG), 16 images (raw))
- DIGIC 4 image processor
- Canon EF/EF-S Lenses
- Canon EX Speedlites
- PAL/NTSC/HDMI video output
- File Formats include: JPEG, raw, sRAW1 (7.1 MP) and sRAW2 (3.8 MP)
- Raw and JPEG simultaneous recording
- USB 2.0 computer interface
- BP-511/BP-511A or BP-512/BP-514 Battery Types (BP-511A battery supplied)
- Dimensions 146 mm × 108 mm × 74 mm (5.7 in × 4.2 in × 2.9 in)
- Approx weight 730 g (1.61 lb)
- Retail price at time of release $1399 (body only)

== Improvements ==
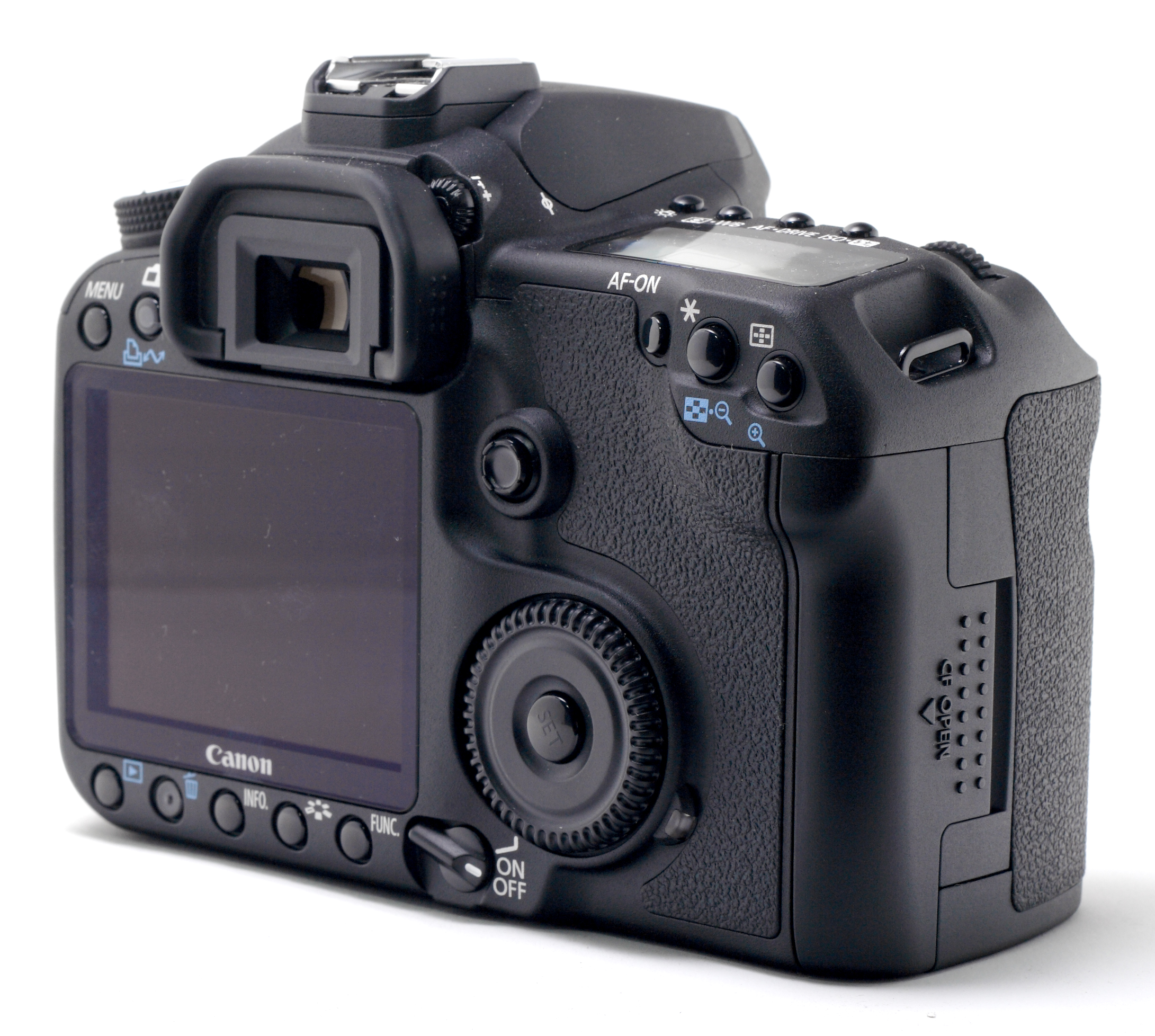

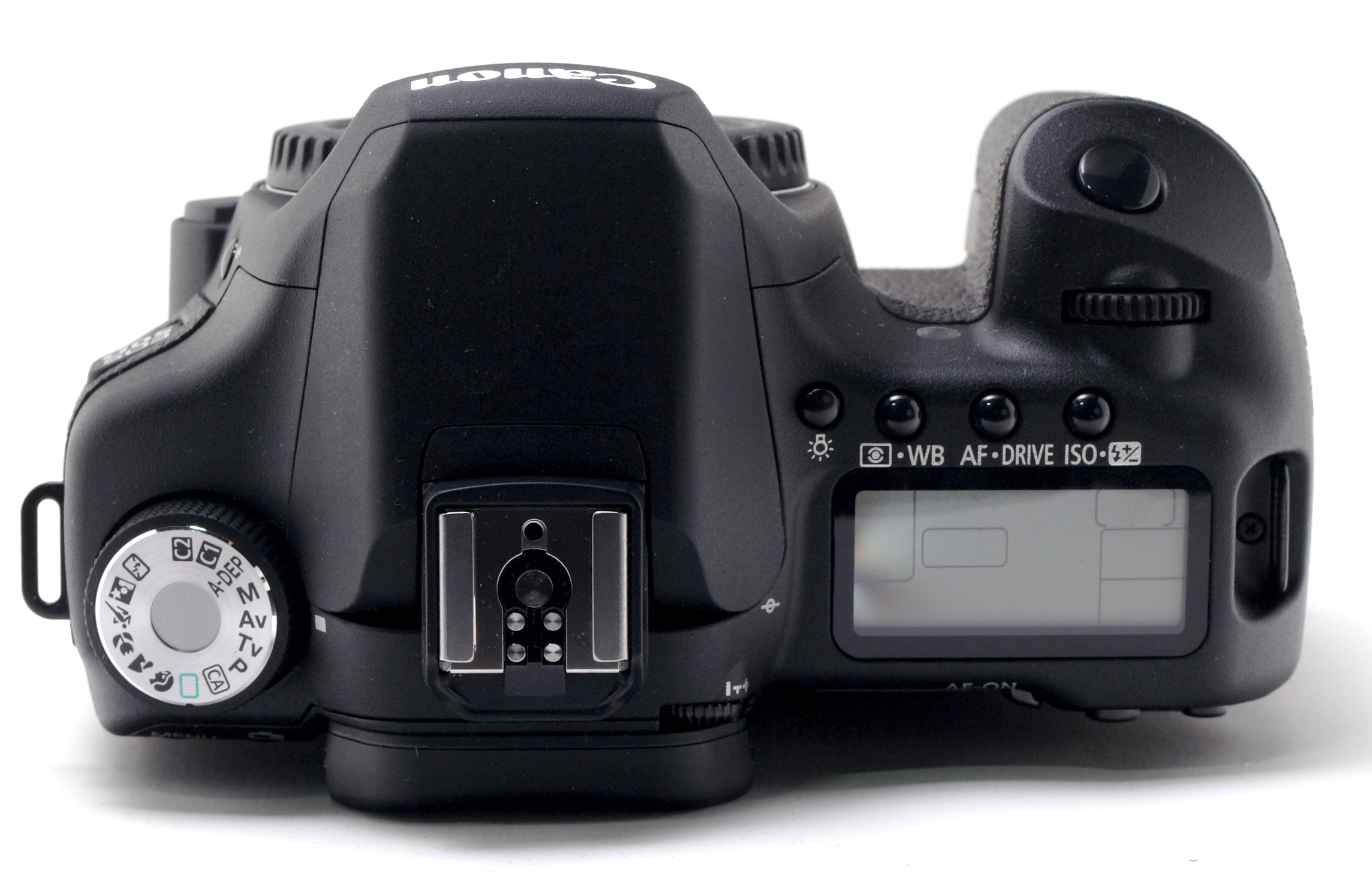

Changes over the 40D include a higher-resolution sensor (15.1 megapixel instead of 10.1 megapixel).

The ISO goes up to 3200 in standard mode, and can be increased to 12800 through the use of a custom function. The burst rate is the same as on the 40D, 6.3 frames per second, though the 40D was advertised as 6.5.

The camera uses Canon's DIGIC 4 image processor. The processor delivers more responsive operation, improved color rendition and near-instant start-up time. A new sensor cleaning system has also been introduced. The camera can also use the Canon Wireless File Transmitter WFT-E3/E3A.

The 50D has a 3-inch screen – the same size as the 40D – but the resolution is 640×480 pixels, which allows it to show more image detail than any of Canon's previous 3" LCD displays. The 50D features two new Autofocus Modes in Liveview and an HDMI port.

The 50D was offered as a body only or in a package with a new EF-S 18-200mm f/3.5-5.6 IS lens or EF 28–135 f/3.5-5.6 IS USM lens.

== Image quality and noise ==
The 50D adds 5 megapixels to an APS-C sized sensor (compared to the 40D), and as a result the size of the individual photosensors has decreased. To offset the increased noise that inevitably results from smaller photosensors, Canon eliminated the gaps between the microlenses covering the photosensors. Thus the microlenses are larger, and capture more light and direct it to the sensor sites.

== Reception ==
The Canon EOS 50D received generally favourable reviews. Digital Photography Review concluded: "Looking at the specification differences between the EOS 40D and our test candidate it appears you pay quite a premium for the 50D's extra megapixels and as we've found out during this review you don't get an awful lot of extra image quality for your money. The Canon EOS 50D still earns itself our highest reward but considering its price point and our slight concerns about its pixel-packed sensor, it only does so by a whisker." Gordon Laing of CameraLabs.com had a slightly better view of the camera, noting that "Canon’s bold claims of matching the noise levels of the earlier EOS 40D were confirmed in our High ISO tests," and concluded by calling it "a very capable DSLR that handles confidently, delivers great results and is a joy to use. . . .[but] to exploit that high resolution you’ll need to couple it with a decent quality lens."

== Magic Lantern video ==
As of 2013, there has been Magic Lantern development of 50D video support. The 50D compares favorably to many later Canon APS-C models in terms of light sensitivity: "The camera is also a totally unbelievable low light performer. The 50D was designed before the megapixel race really took off. It has a 15MP APS-C sensor, so individual pixels are much larger than those on the later 18MP Rebel CMOS sensors.". In addition to raw video, the Magic Lantern firmware add-on also enabled high bitrate compressed H.264 video at 30 frames per second. Other publications, while impressed, pointed out downsides such as no audio, expensive fast CF-cards and no Canon support for Magic Lantern firmware.

Type	Sensor	Class	00	01	02	03	04	05	06	07	08	09	10	11	12	13	14	15	16	17	18	19	20	21	22	23	24	25	26
DSLR	Full-frame	Flagship				1Ds		1Ds Mk II			1Ds Mk III					1D C													
DSLR	Full-frame	Flagship				1Ds		1Ds Mk II			1Ds Mk III				1D X					1D X Mk II ^{T}			1D X Mk III ^{T}						
DSLR	APS-H	Flagship			1D			1D Mk II	1D Mk II N		1D Mk III		1D Mk IV																
DSLR	Full-frame	Professional																	5DS / 5DS R										
DSLR	Full-frame	Professional							5D			_{x} 5D Mk II			_{x} 5D Mk III					5D Mk IV ^{T}									
DSLR	Full-frame	Advanced														_{x} 6D					_{x} 6D Mk II ^{AT}								
DSLR	APS-C	Advanced											_{x} 7D					_{x} 7D Mk II											
DSLR	APS-C	Mid-range						20Da								_{x} 60Da ^{A}													
DSLR	APS-C	Mid-range		D30	D60	10D		20D	30D		40D	_{x} 50D		_{x} 60D ^{A}			_{x} 70D ^{AT}		80D ^{AT}				90D ^{AT}						
DSLR	APS-C	Mid-range																	760D ^{AT}		77D ^{AT}								
DSLR	APS-C	Entry-level					300D	350D		400D	450D	_{x} 500D	_{x} 550D	_{x} 600D ^{A}		_{x} 650D ^{AT}	_{x} 700D ^{AT}		_{x} 750D ^{AT}		800D ^{AT}			850D ^{AT}					
DSLR	APS-C	Entry-level															_{x} 100D ^{T}		_{x} 200D ^{AT}				250D ^{AT}						
DSLR	APS-C	Entry-level										1000D		_{x} 1100D			_{x} 1200D			1300D		2000D							
DSLR	APS-C	Value																				4000D							
Early models			Canon EOS DCS 5 (1995); Canon EOS DCS 3 (1995); Canon EOS DCS 1 (1995); Canon EOS D2000 (1998); Canon EOS D6000 (1998)																										
Type	Sensor	Spec																											
Type	Sensor	Spec	00	01	02	03	04	05	06	07	08	09	10	11	12	13	14	15	16	17	18	19	20	21	22	23	24	25	26
