= Canon EOS 90D =

2019 APS-C digital single-lens reflex camera

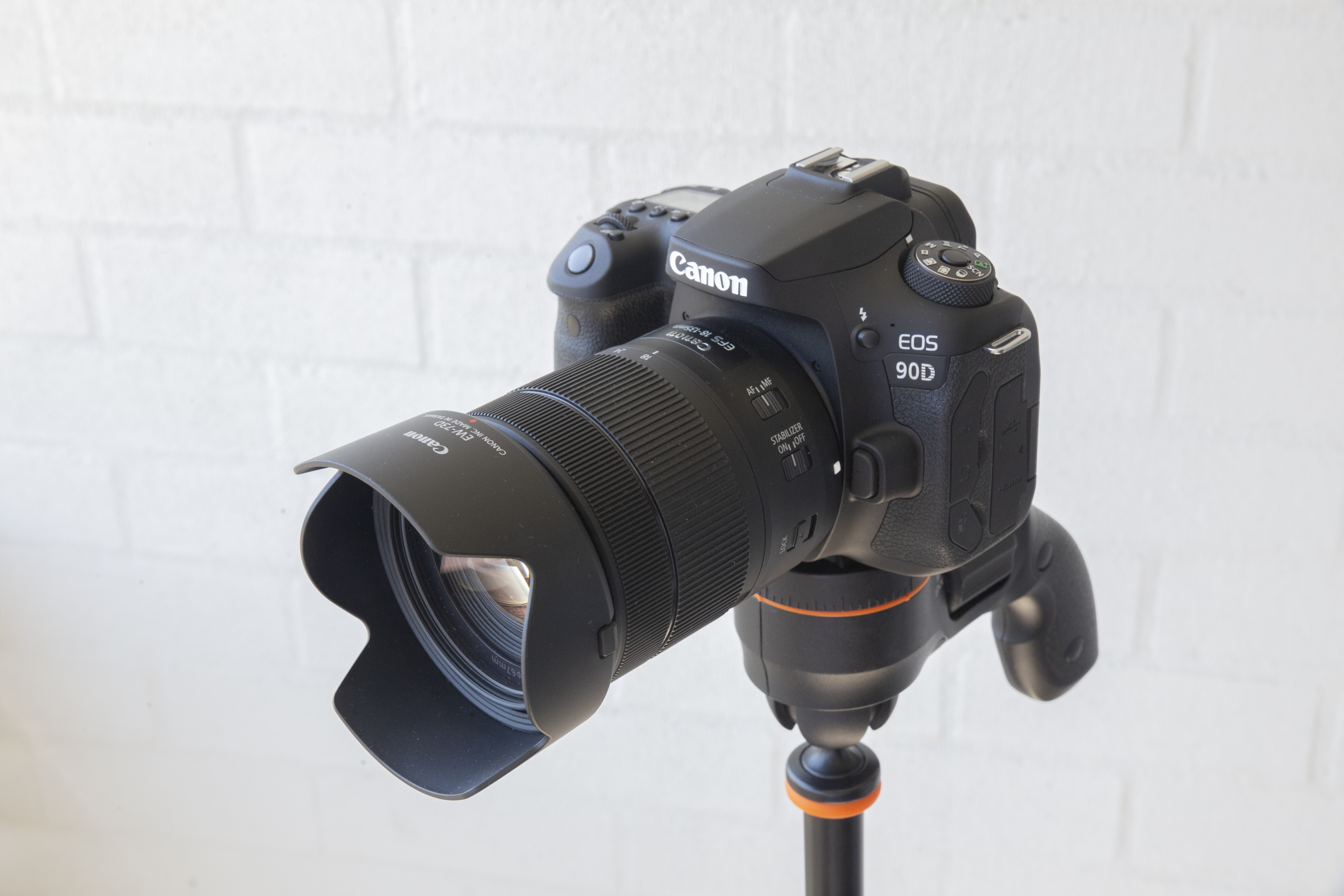

Overview
- Maker: Canon
- Type: Digital single-lens reflex camera
- Intro price: US$1,199.00 (body only); US$1,349.00 (EF-S 18-55mm IS STM); US$1,599.00 (EF-S 18-135mm IS USM)

Lens
- Lens mount: Canon EF-S
- Lens: Interchangeable

Sensor/medium
- Sensor: APS-C (22.3 x 14.9 mm)
- Sensor type: CMOS
- Sensor size: 22.3 × 14.9 mm (APS-C format)
- Maximum resolution: 32.5 megapixels (6960 × 4640 pixels with 3.2 μm pixel size)
- Film speed: 100 – 25600 in 1/3 stop increments (expandable up to H: 51200)
- Storage media: SD/SDHC/SDXC card (UHS-II bus supported)

Focusing
- Focus modes: One-Shot, AI Focus, AI Servo, Live View (FlexiZone - Multi, FlexiZone - Single, Face detection, Movie Servo)
- Focus areas: 45 cross-type AF points (optical viewfinder), 5481 phase-detection points (live-view)
- Focus bracketing: Yes

Exposure/metering
- Exposure modes: Scene Intelligent Auto, Flash Off, Creative Auto, Special Scene (Portrait, Landscape, Close-up, Sports, Night Portrait, Handheld Night Scene, HDR Backlight Control), Creative Filters, Program AE, Shutter priority AE, Aperture priority AE, Manual exposure, Bulb exposure, Custom (2x), Movie
- Exposure metering: TTL, full aperture, 216 zones sensor with 220,000 pixels RGB + IR sensor
- Metering modes: Evaluative, Partial, Spot, Centre-weighted Average

Flash
- Flash: E-TTL II manual-pop-up built-in / External
- Flash bracketing: Yes

Shutter
- Shutter: Electronic focal-plane
- Shutter speed range: 30 sec. – 1/8000 sec. (mechanical shutter) or 1/16000 .sec (electronic shutter), Bulb; X-sync at 1/250 sec.
- Continuous shooting: Up to 10 fps

Viewfinder
- Viewfinder: Optical pentaprism with 100% coverage and 0.95x magnification / LiveView LCD

Image processing
- Image processor: DIGIC 8
- White balance: Auto, Daylight, Shade, Cloudy, Tungsten, White Fluorescent, Flash, Kelvin (2500 K – 10000 K in 100 K steps)
- WB bracketing: Yes

General
- LCD screen: 3.0" (7.7 cm) Clear View II color TFT vari-angle LCD touchscreen with 1,040,000 dots
- Battery: Li-Ion LP-E6N rechargeable (1800 mAh); 1300 shots (CIPA rating)
- Optional battery packs: BG-E14 grip allows the use of 6 AA cells, one LP-E6N battery or two LP-E6N batteries
- Dimensions: 140.8 mm × 104.8 mm × 76.8 mm (5.54 in × 4.13 in × 3.02 in) (W × H × D)
- Weight: 701 g (24.7 oz) (body only)
- Latest firmware: 1.1.1 / 25 October 2019; 6 years ago
- Made in: Japan

Chronology
- Predecessor: Canon EOS 80D
- Successor: Canon EOS R10 (mirrorless)

The Canon EOS 90D is a digital single-lens reflex (DSLR) camera released by Canon on August 28, 2019. It has a body-only MSRP of US$1199, which is the same as the Canon EOS 80D, which it replaces.

The camera is one of Canon's APS-C cameras part of the Canon EOS two-digit line, it is the successor to the EOS 80D and is referred to as an enthusiast model. The 90D has a 32.5 Megapixel APS-C image CMOS sensor. The 90D is offered as a body only, with the EF-S 18-55mm IS STM kit lens or the EF-S 18-135mm IS USM kit lens.

== New features the EOS 90D improved over the 80D ==
The Canon EOS 90D introduces several key improvements over its predecessor, the 80D, including:

- A 32.5 megapixel APS-C CMOS sensor (up from 24.2MP)
- The faster DIGIC 8 processor
- 4K UHD video recording without a crop
- 45-point cross-type autofocus system
- Faster continuous shooting up to 10 frames per second
  - Up 7 frames per second in live-view
- Dual Pixel CMOS AF with 5481 phase-detection points
- Bluetooth
- A more durable weather-sealed body
- Improved battery life which offers a significant boost in performance and versatility for both photography and video
- A joystick which offers the ability to move the focus point more easily, which makes the 90D the first Canon EOS two-digit line body since the 50D to include one

== See also ==
other Canon APS-C cameras with sensors higher than 24 megapixels:

- Canon EOS R7
- Canon EOS M6 Mark II

Type	Sensor	Class	00	01	02	03	04	05	06	07	08	09	10	11	12	13	14	15	16	17	18	19	20	21	22	23	24	25	26
DSLR	Full-frame	Flagship				1Ds		1Ds Mk II			1Ds Mk III					1D C													
DSLR	Full-frame	Flagship				1Ds		1Ds Mk II			1Ds Mk III				1D X					1D X Mk II ^{T}			1D X Mk III ^{T}						
DSLR	APS-H	Flagship			1D			1D Mk II	1D Mk II N		1D Mk III		1D Mk IV																
DSLR	Full-frame	Professional																	5DS / 5DS R										
DSLR	Full-frame	Professional							5D			_{x} 5D Mk II			_{x} 5D Mk III					5D Mk IV ^{T}									
DSLR	Full-frame	Advanced														_{x} 6D					_{x} 6D Mk II ^{AT}								
DSLR	APS-C	Advanced											_{x} 7D					_{x} 7D Mk II											
DSLR	APS-C	Mid-range						20Da								_{x} 60Da ^{A}													
DSLR	APS-C	Mid-range		D30	D60	10D		20D	30D		40D	_{x} 50D		_{x} 60D ^{A}			_{x} 70D ^{AT}		80D ^{AT}				90D ^{AT}						
DSLR	APS-C	Mid-range																	760D ^{AT}		77D ^{AT}								
DSLR	APS-C	Entry-level					300D	350D		400D	450D	_{x} 500D	_{x} 550D	_{x} 600D ^{A}		_{x} 650D ^{AT}	_{x} 700D ^{AT}		_{x} 750D ^{AT}		800D ^{AT}			850D ^{AT}					
DSLR	APS-C	Entry-level															_{x} 100D ^{T}		_{x} 200D ^{AT}				250D ^{AT}						
DSLR	APS-C	Entry-level										1000D		_{x} 1100D			_{x} 1200D			1300D		2000D							
DSLR	APS-C	Value																				4000D							
Early models			Canon EOS DCS 5 (1995); Canon EOS DCS 3 (1995); Canon EOS DCS 1 (1995); Canon EOS D2000 (1998); Canon EOS D6000 (1998)																										
Type	Sensor	Spec																											
Type	Sensor	Spec	00	01	02	03	04	05	06	07	08	09	10	11	12	13	14	15	16	17	18	19	20	21	22	23	24	25	26
