= Canon EOS 40D =

2007 APS-C digital single-lens reflex camera

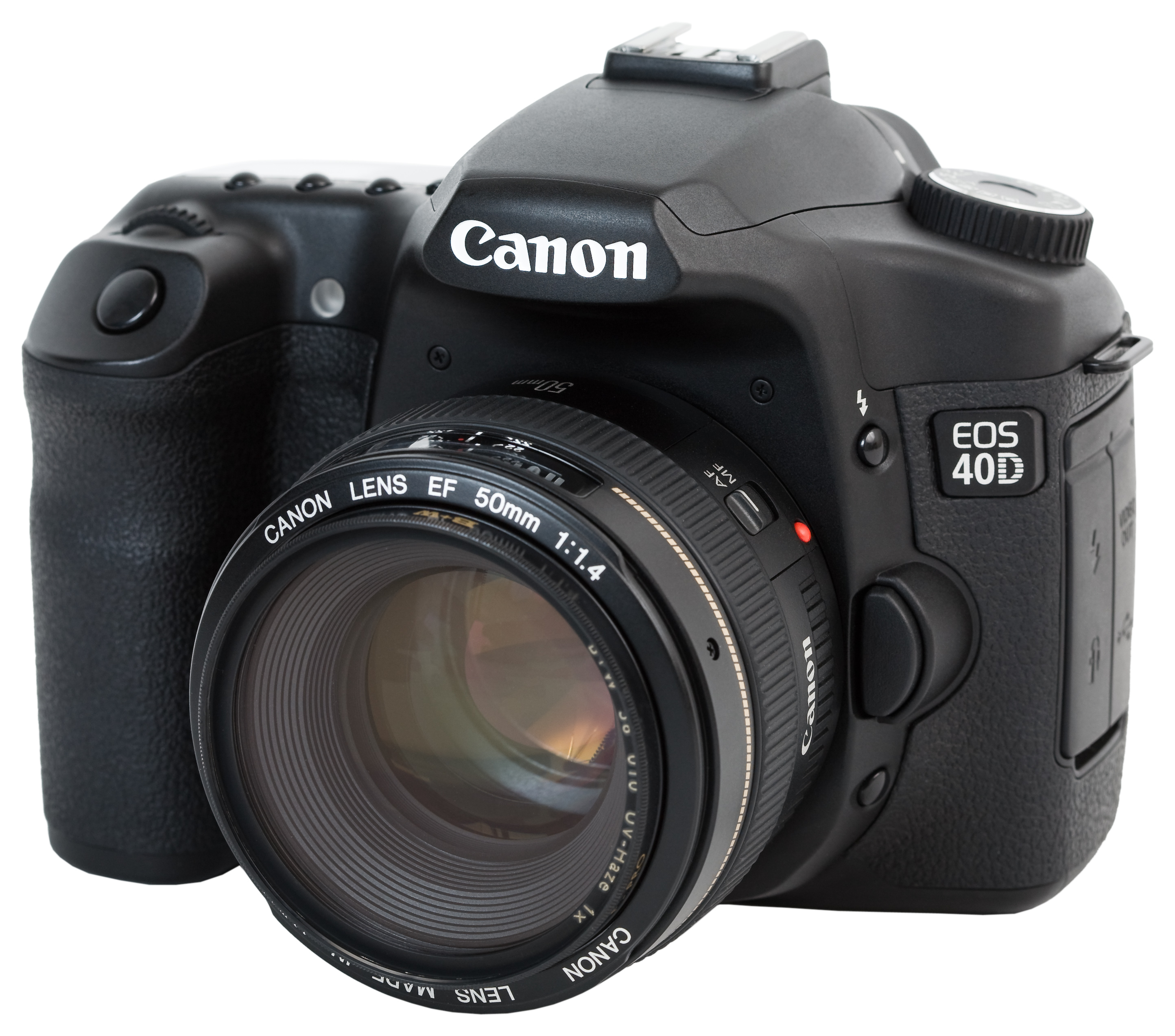

Overview
- Maker: Canon Inc.
- Type: Digital single-lens reflex
- Released: August 2007
- Intro price: Body only: €1299 / $1299

Lens
- Lens mount: Canon EF-S
- Lens: Interchangeable

Sensor/medium
- Sensor: 22.2 x 14.8 mm CMOS
- Maximum resolution: 3888 × 2592 (10.1 megapixels)
- Film speed: 100–1600 in 1/3 EV steps; 3200 expansion available
- Storage media: CompactFlash (CF) (Type I or Type II) and Microdrive (max 32GB)

Focusing
- Focus modes: One-shot, AI Servo, AI-Focus, Manual
- Focus areas: 9 user points (cross type)
- Focus bracketing: none

Exposure/metering
- Exposure modes: Full auto, programmed, shutter-priority, aperture priority, manual
- Exposure metering: TTL, full aperture, zones
- Metering modes: 35-area Evaluative, Partial, Spot, C/Wgt Average

Flash
- Flash: pop-up, sync at 1/250 second
- Flash bracketing: none

Shutter
- Shutter: focal-plane
- Shutter speed range: 30 s to 1/8000 s, bulb
- Continuous shooting: 3 or 6.5 frames/second (selectable)

Viewfinder
- Viewfinder: Optical / LiveView LCD

Image processing
- Image processor: Canon DIGIC III
- White balance: 7 presets, Auto and custom 2000–10000 kelvins, 100 K steps
- WB bracketing: 3 images, ±9 levels

General
- LCD screen: 3.0 in (76 mm), 320 × 240 pixels (4:3)
- Battery: Li-Ion BP-511A rechargeable
- Optional battery packs: BP-511A, BP-514, BP-511, BP-512. BG-E2N grip allows use of AA batteries.
- Dimensions: 145.5×107.8×73.5 mm (5.73×4.24×2.89 in)
- Weight: 740 g (body only), 822g (29oz) (with battery & card)
- Made in: Japan

Chronology
- Predecessor: Canon EOS 30D
- Successor: Canon EOS 50D

The Canon EOS 40D is a 10.1-megapixel semi-professional digital single-lens reflex camera. It was initially announced on 20 August 2007 and was released at the end of that month. It is the successor of the Canon EOS 30D, and is succeeded by the EOS 50D. It can accept EF and EF-S lenses. Like its predecessor, it uses an APS-C sized image sensor, resulting in a 1.6x field of view crop factor.

== Improvements ==
Changes over the 30D include a higher-resolution sensor (10.1 megapixel instead of 8.2). The sensor also has better noise control than previous models. The 40D has a larger memory buffer so more pictures can be taken in succession without a slow down in frame rate. Frames per second has been increased from 5 to 6.5.

The 40D adds a new format, Canon's sRAW, which is a smaller RAW image for smaller prints and reduced file sizes. The 40D's RAW format is 14-bit instead of the 12-bit of the 30D.

The camera uses the new DIGIC III image processor, which was first used in the Canon EOS-1D Mark III, introduced earlier that year. Canon's DIGIC III processor delivers responsive operation, improved color rendering and near-instant start-up time. A new sensor cleaning system has been introduced. It can also use the Canon Wireless File Transmitter WFT-E3/E3A.

The 40D has a larger screen (3", of the same resolution of 320 × 240 pixel = 76,800 pixels) than the 30D (2.5"). There is also a new menu for external and internal flash control, including second curtain sync.

Other additions on the Canon 40D include interchangeable focusing screens, an AF-ON button, the EOS Integrated Cleaning System for sensor dust reduction, rubber strips around the battery and CF doors for improved weather sealing and three new optional accessories: an IS version of the 18-55mm kit lens; a new backward-compatible, live view mode, and a weather-sealed battery grip.

== Overview and features ==
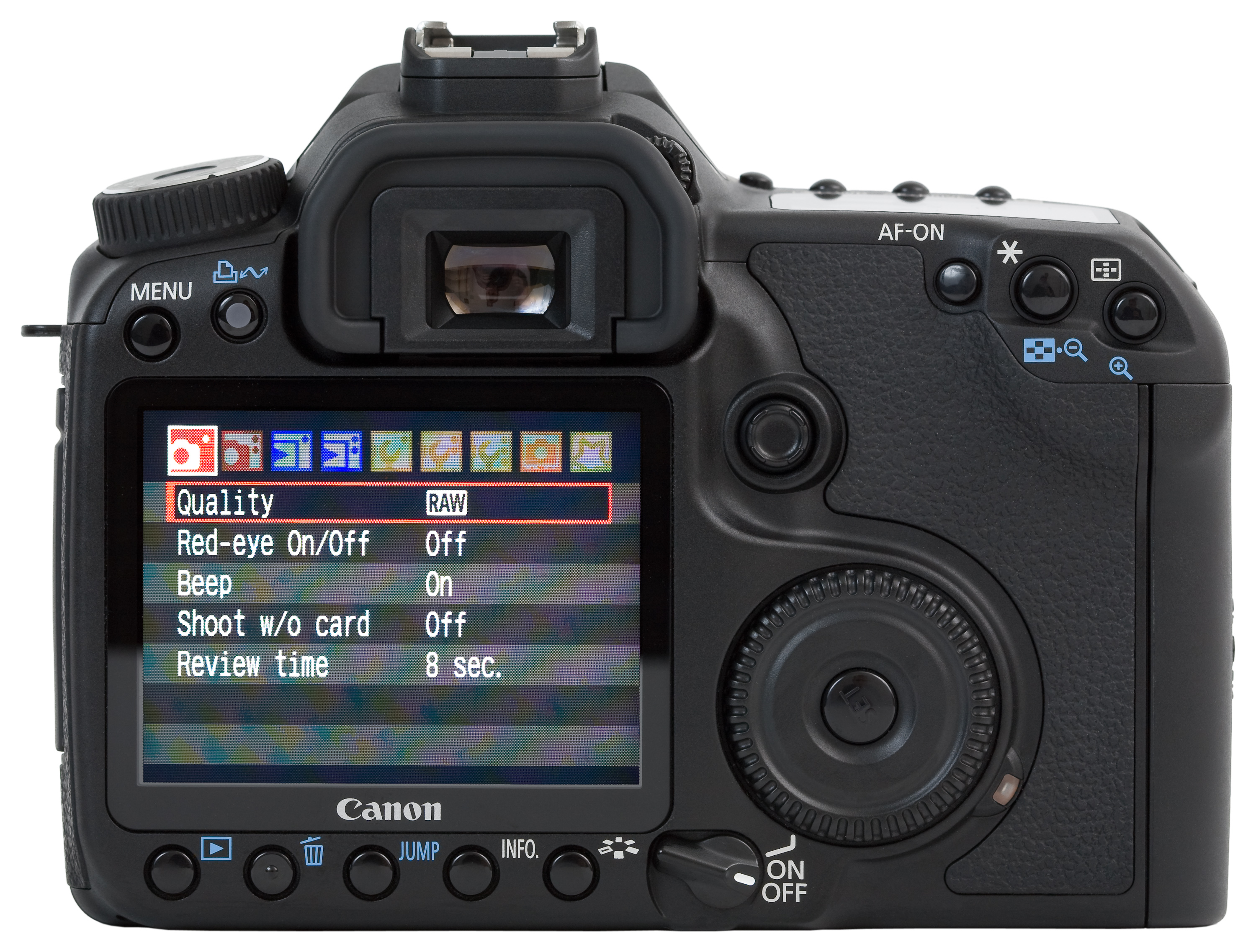
Back of the Canon EOS 40D camera

The 40D has many similar characteristics to its predecessors the 20D and 30D, but also many differences. This includes various shooting modes, ability to change ISO and white balance, a pop-up flash unit, an LCD screen of 3.0 inches (an upgrade from the previous model, the Canon EOS 30D with a screen of only 2.5 inches), and a rugged magnesium alloy protective inner-shell, which both the Canon 30D and 40D have.

The newest feature to the 40D is Live View (previously used on the EOS 20Da), allowing photographers to use the LCD screen as their viewfinder. It is very useful for taking pictures low to the ground, when the eye cannot reach the viewfinder. The shutter noise is quieter in this mode as well.

- 10.1 megapixel APS-C CMOS sensor
- DIGIC III processor
- 3.0 inch LCD Monitor
- 14-bit Processor
- Live View Mode
- Wide 9-point AF (all points are cross-type with the centre point having an additional f/2.8 sensitive cross-type sensor placed diagonally)
- Selectable AF and metering modes
- Built in Flash
- EOS Integrated Cleaning System
- ISO 100–1600 (3200 with custom function)
- Continuous Drive up to 6.5 frame/s (75 images (JPEG), 17 images (RAW))
- Canon EF/EF-S Lenses
- Canon EX Speedlites
- PAL/NTSC video output
- File Formats include: JPEG, RAW, sRAW (both RAW formats are 14-bit)
- RAW & JPEG simultaneous recording
- USB 2.0 computer interface
- BP-511/BP-511A or BP-512/BP-514 Battery Types (BP-511A battery supplied)
- Tough inner metal (magnesium alloy) shell
- Approx Weight 0.822 kg

== Firmware and software ==
As of May 2014, the latest firmware is 1.1.1, released 20 January 2009. The firmware updates have fixed some bugs, and made minor changes in operation.

Canon released its DPP 3.1 RAW converter alongside the 40D.

Initially, Adobe Lightroom did not have official support for the 40D though RAW, but JPEGs from the camera did still work. Official support for the 40D as well as the 1Ds Mark III was added with Lightroom 1.3, available as a free update from Adobe.

Type	Sensor	Class	00	01	02	03	04	05	06	07	08	09	10	11	12	13	14	15	16	17	18	19	20	21	22	23	24	25	26
DSLR	Full-frame	Flagship				1Ds		1Ds Mk II			1Ds Mk III					1D C													
DSLR	Full-frame	Flagship				1Ds		1Ds Mk II			1Ds Mk III				1D X					1D X Mk II ^{T}			1D X Mk III ^{T}						
DSLR	APS-H	Flagship			1D			1D Mk II	1D Mk II N		1D Mk III		1D Mk IV																
DSLR	Full-frame	Professional																	5DS / 5DS R										
DSLR	Full-frame	Professional							5D			_{x} 5D Mk II			_{x} 5D Mk III					5D Mk IV ^{T}									
DSLR	Full-frame	Advanced														_{x} 6D					_{x} 6D Mk II ^{AT}								
DSLR	APS-C	Advanced											_{x} 7D					_{x} 7D Mk II											
DSLR	APS-C	Mid-range						20Da								_{x} 60Da ^{A}													
DSLR	APS-C	Mid-range		D30	D60	10D		20D	30D		40D	_{x} 50D		_{x} 60D ^{A}			_{x} 70D ^{AT}		80D ^{AT}				90D ^{AT}						
DSLR	APS-C	Mid-range																	760D ^{AT}		77D ^{AT}								
DSLR	APS-C	Entry-level					300D	350D		400D	450D	_{x} 500D	_{x} 550D	_{x} 600D ^{A}		_{x} 650D ^{AT}	_{x} 700D ^{AT}		_{x} 750D ^{AT}		800D ^{AT}			850D ^{AT}					
DSLR	APS-C	Entry-level															_{x} 100D ^{T}		_{x} 200D ^{AT}				250D ^{AT}						
DSLR	APS-C	Entry-level										1000D		_{x} 1100D			_{x} 1200D			1300D		2000D							
DSLR	APS-C	Value																				4000D							
Early models			Canon EOS DCS 5 (1995); Canon EOS DCS 3 (1995); Canon EOS DCS 1 (1995); Canon EOS D2000 (1998); Canon EOS D6000 (1998)																										
Type	Sensor	Spec																											
Type	Sensor	Spec	00	01	02	03	04	05	06	07	08	09	10	11	12	13	14	15	16	17	18	19	20	21	22	23	24	25	26
