= Canon EOS 20D =

2004 APS-C digital single-lens reflex camera

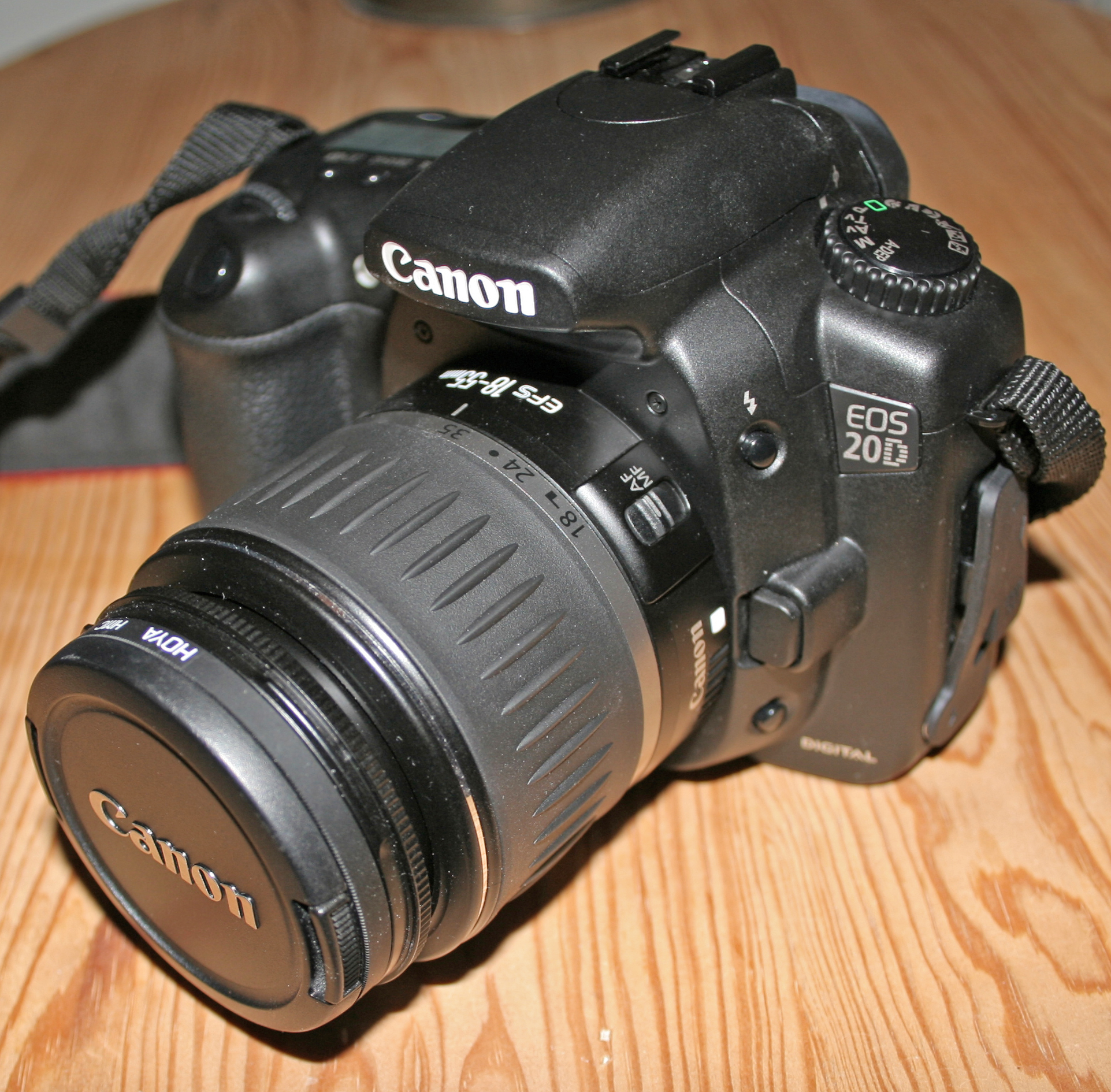

Overview
- Maker: Canon Inc.
- Type: Single-lens reflex

Lens
- Lens mount: Canon EF-S
- Lens: Interchangeable

Sensor/medium
- Sensor: 22.5 mm × 15.0 mm CMOS
- Maximum resolution: 3,520 × 2,344 (8.25 megapixels)
- Film speed: 100–1600 in 1 EV steps, 3200 in extended mode
- Storage media: CompactFlash (CF) (Type I or Type II) and Microdrive (MD) / max 8GB (The camera can format up to 8GB, but can use larger cards.)

Focusing
- Focus modes: One-shot, AI servo, AI Focus, Manual
- Focus areas: 9 autofocus points
- Focus bracketing: none

Exposure/metering
- Exposure modes: Full auto, programmed, shutter-priority, aperture priority, manual
- Exposure metering: TTL full aperture, 35 area evaluative, partial, center-weighted
- Metering modes: Evaluative, Partial, C/Wgt Average

Flash
- Flash: Auto pop-up E-TTL II (retractable)
- Flash bracketing: none

Shutter
- Shutter: Vertical travel, focal-plane shutter, all speeds electronically controlled
- Shutter speed range: 1/8,000 to 30 s, bulb
- Continuous shooting: 5.0 frame/s, up to 23 frames (6 in RAW)

Viewfinder
- Viewfinder: Optical, pentaprism

Image processing
- Image processor: DIGIC 2
- White balance: 7 presets, Auto and custom
- WB bracketing: ±3 stops, blue-amber or magenta-green bias

General
- LCD screen: 1.8 in (46 mm), 118,000 pixels
- Battery: Main battery Li-Ion BP-511A rechargeable battery pack; internal memory battery CR2016 supports clock, frame counter
- Optional battery packs: Li-Ion BP-511A, BP-511, BP-512, BP-514AC and optional DC coupler.
- Dimensions: 144×105.5×71.5 mm (5.67×4.15×2.81 in)
- Weight: 685 g (24 oz) (body only)
- Made in: Japan

Chronology
- Predecessor: Canon EOS 10D
- Successor: Canon EOS 30D

The Canon EOS 20D is an 8.2-megapixel semi-professional digital single-lens reflex camera, initially announced on 19 August 2004 at a recommended retail price of US$1,499. It is the successor of the EOS 10D, and was succeeded by the EOS 30D in August 2006. It accepts EF and EF-S lenses and uses an APS-C sized image sensor.

== Improvements ==
The 20D features a new sensor and a greater megapixel count (8.2 megapixels instead of 6.3) and retains the Canon 1.6x crop factor. The 20D supports USB 2.0. The 20D has a larger buffer and can shoot more frames per second. It also uses the E-TTL II flash metering system and uses the DIGIC II image processor.

The EOS 20D (with appropriate firmware updates) can also accept the Canon Wireless File Transmitter WFT-E1/E1A for fast file transfer to a remote file server, either through an ethernet cable or a Wi-Fi network.

== Resolution ==
The Canon EOS 20D has several resolution settings:

- Large/Fine (3504 x 2336 JPEG Fine)
- Large/Normal (3504 x 2336 JPEG Normal)
- Medium/Fine (2544 x 1696 JPEG Fine)
- Medium/Normal (2544 x 1696 JPEG Normal)
- Small/Fine – (1728 x 1152 JPEG Fine)
- Small/Normal (1728 x 1152 JPEG Normal)
- RAW + Large/Fine (3504 RAW + 3504 JPEG Fine)
- RAW + Large/Normal (3504 RAW + 3504 JPEG Normal)
- RAW + Medium/Fine (3504 RAW + 2544 JPEG Fine)
- RAW + Medium / Normal (3504 RAW + 2544 JPEG Normal)
- RAW + Small/Fine (3504 RAW + 1152 JPEG Fine)
- RAW + Small/Normal – (3504 RAW + 1152 JPEG Normal)
- RAW (3504 x 2336 RAW)

== Features ==
The 20D is the first Canon prosumer camera to use the EF-S lens mount; the first Canon EOS camera to use the mount was the 300D (the Digital Rebel in North America).

=== Creative Zone ===
- A-DEP: The camera automatically selects the aperture and shutter speed to keep most of the image in focus. (Only recommended in high light conditions as the camera tends to choose smaller f/stops)
- M (Manual): The camera lets you choose manually the aperture and shutter speed.
- Av (Aperture priority): The camera lets the user choose the aperture (f/) value and then automatically adjusts the shutter speed for correct exposure.
- Tv (Shutter speed priority): The camera lets the user set the shutter speed and automatically sets the aperture for correct exposure.
- P (Program AE): The camera automatically chooses an aperture and shutter combination for correct exposure and the user can change between one of these combinations.

=== Basic Zone ===
- Auto (represented with a green rectangle): Completely automatic shooting.
- Portrait: The camera attempts to create a more shallow depth of field to create more striking portraits.
- Landscape: For shooting landscapes and sunsets.
- Close-Up: For shooting small objects near to the camera.
- Sports: For capturing fast moving objects.
- Night Scene: Shoots with flash and with slow shutter so that the subject is illuminated by the flash and the background (e.g. a city) is also captured naturally in the night.
- No Flash: All automatic with no flash.

== EOS 20Da ==
Canon released the EOS 20Da on 14 February 2005 in Japan. It is a variant of the 20D designed for astrophotography. On 1 June 2005 Canon announced that the 20Da would be made available worldwide.

The main differences between the 20Da and 20D are the replacement of the "hot mirror" infra-red (IR) filter which covers the CMOS sensor on the 20D and live view mode.

In conventional photography, the IR filter is used to make the spectral response of the CMOS sensor more like that of the human eye. In this way, the pictures gathered by the sensor more closely resemble the world as we see it. In astro-photography, many objects of interest emit strongly in the red H-α line, which is heavily attenuated by the IR filter on the 20D. The IR filter of the 20Da passes 2.5 times more light at around this 656 nm wavelength as the filter of the 20D, allowing more fine detail to be revealed in long exposures of emission nebulae. As a side effect, the color balance is slightly altered in normal daylight photography.

It is extremely difficult to focus an extremely dim image with a reflex viewfinder; locking the mirror up and opening the shutter (live view) was introduced in the 20Da to address this issue. When used the camera provides a live image of the center of the field of view to allow focusing on a bright star. Live view for this application requires a lens which supports fully mechanical focus in manual mode, and is not suitable for normal daytime use.

Reviews report that image noise in the 20Da is lower than in the 20D, and equivalent to that of the 5D MkII.

The EOS 20Da was discontinued when the 30D was introduced in 2006. Canon produced no similar model for astrophotography for years, resulting in many astrophotographers making similar aftermarket modifications to later Canon models.

In April 2012, Canon announced the EOS 60Da which is the successor to the EOS 20Da.

== Firmware ==
The latest firmware available for the 20D (and believed to be the final update) is version 2.0.3, made available 23 August 2005, which improves the communication reliability with some CF cards and other minor changes.

Type	Sensor	Class	00	01	02	03	04	05	06	07	08	09	10	11	12	13	14	15	16	17	18	19	20	21	22	23	24	25	26
DSLR	Full-frame	Flagship				1Ds		1Ds Mk II			1Ds Mk III					1D C													
DSLR	Full-frame	Flagship				1Ds		1Ds Mk II			1Ds Mk III				1D X					1D X Mk II ^{T}			1D X Mk III ^{T}						
DSLR	APS-H	Flagship			1D			1D Mk II	1D Mk II N		1D Mk III		1D Mk IV																
DSLR	Full-frame	Professional																	5DS / 5DS R										
DSLR	Full-frame	Professional							5D			_{x} 5D Mk II			_{x} 5D Mk III					5D Mk IV ^{T}									
DSLR	Full-frame	Advanced														_{x} 6D					_{x} 6D Mk II ^{AT}								
DSLR	APS-C	Advanced											_{x} 7D					_{x} 7D Mk II											
DSLR	APS-C	Mid-range						20Da								_{x} 60Da ^{A}													
DSLR	APS-C	Mid-range		D30	D60	10D		20D	30D		40D	_{x} 50D		_{x} 60D ^{A}			_{x} 70D ^{AT}		80D ^{AT}				90D ^{AT}						
DSLR	APS-C	Mid-range																	760D ^{AT}		77D ^{AT}								
DSLR	APS-C	Entry-level					300D	350D		400D	450D	_{x} 500D	_{x} 550D	_{x} 600D ^{A}		_{x} 650D ^{AT}	_{x} 700D ^{AT}		_{x} 750D ^{AT}		800D ^{AT}			850D ^{AT}					
DSLR	APS-C	Entry-level															_{x} 100D ^{T}		_{x} 200D ^{AT}				250D ^{AT}						
DSLR	APS-C	Entry-level										1000D		_{x} 1100D			_{x} 1200D			1300D		2000D							
DSLR	APS-C	Value																				4000D							
Early models			Canon EOS DCS 5 (1995); Canon EOS DCS 3 (1995); Canon EOS DCS 1 (1995); Canon EOS D2000 (1998); Canon EOS D6000 (1998)																										
Type	Sensor	Spec																											
Type	Sensor	Spec	00	01	02	03	04	05	06	07	08	09	10	11	12	13	14	15	16	17	18	19	20	21	22	23	24	25	26
