= Canon EF-S 18–200mm lens =

EF-S 18–200 f/3.5–5.6 IS
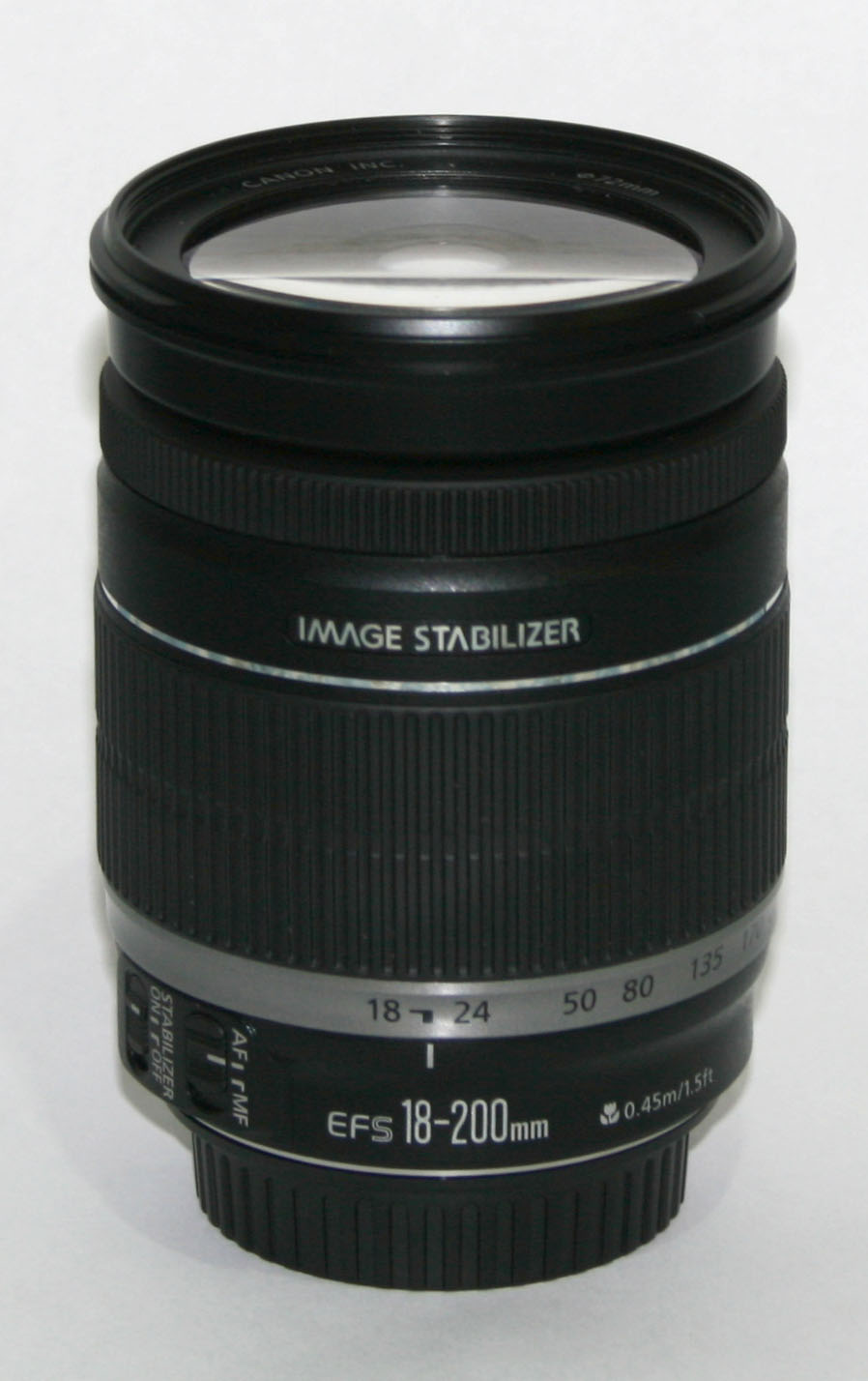
- Maker: Canon

Technical data
- Type: Zoom
- Focal length: 18–200mm
- Focal length (35mm equiv.): 29–320mm
- Crop factor: 1.6
- Aperture (max/min): f/3.5–5.6 / f/22–38
- Close focus distance: 0.45 m
- Max. magnification: 0.24x @ 200mm
- Diaphragm blades: 6
- Construction: 16 elements in 12 groups

Features
- Short back focus: Yes Yes
- Ultrasonic motor: No No
- Lens-based stabilization: Yes Yes
- Macro capable: No No
- Application: Superzoom

Physical
- Max. length: 162.5 mm
- Diameter: 78.6 mm
- Weight: 595g
- Filter diameter: 72 mm

Accessories
- Lens hood: EW-78D
- Case: LP1116 Soft Case

Angle of view
- Horizontal: 64°30'–6°30'
- Vertical: 45°30'–4°20'
- Diagonal: 74°20'–7°50'

History
- Introduction: 2008

Retail info
- MSRP: 700 USD

The Canon EF-S 18–200mm lens is a superzoom lens, manufactured by Canon.
