= Kit lens =

Starter lens which can be sold with an interchangeable-lens camera

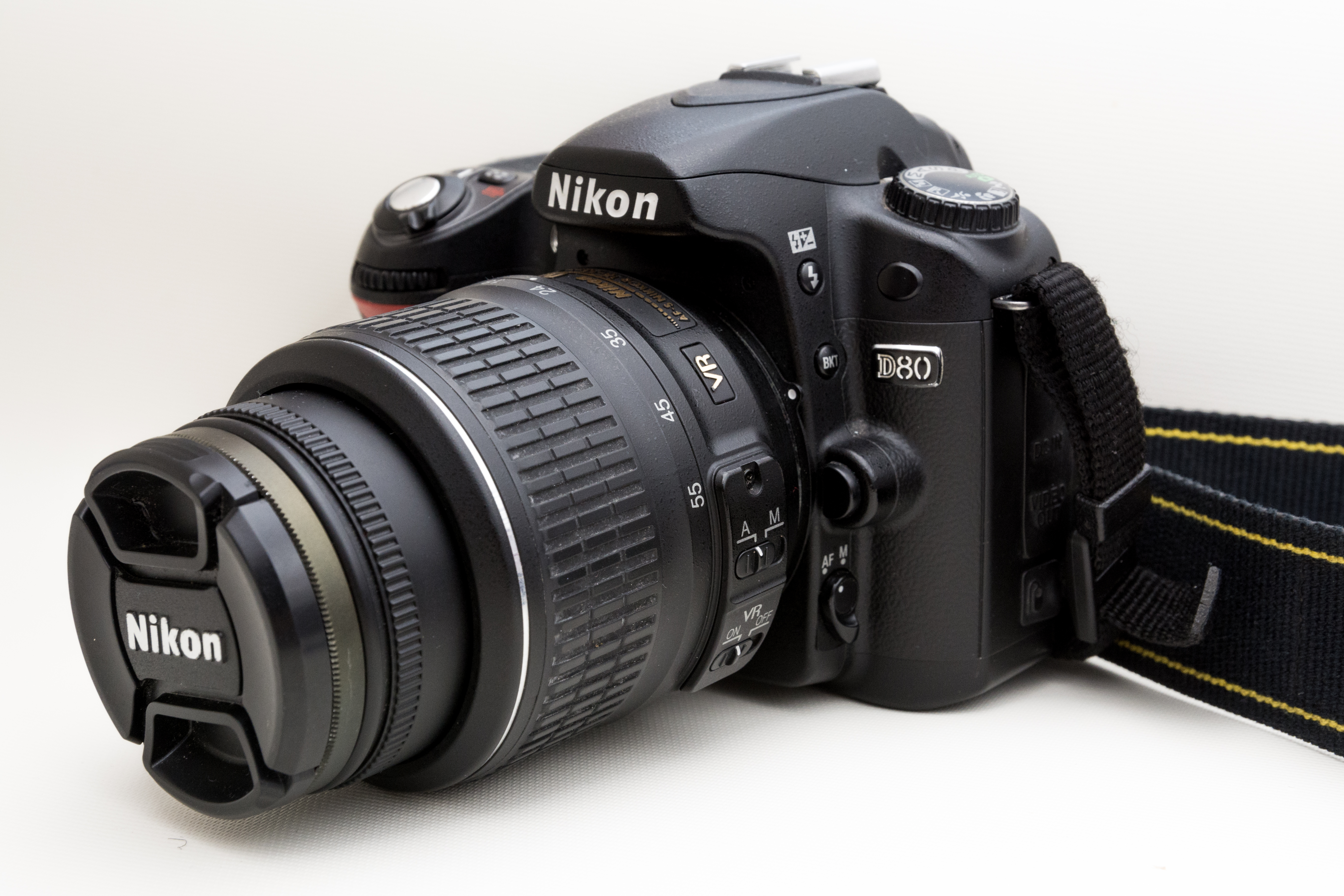
Nikon D80 with a kit lens

A kit lens is a "starter" lens which can be sold with an interchangeable-lens camera such as a mirrorless camera or DSLR. It is generally an inexpensive lens priced at the lowest end of the manufacturer's range so as to not add much to a camera kit's price. The kit consists of the camera body, the lens, and various accessories usually necessary to get started. A kit lens can be sold by itself outside of a kit, particularly the ones that are moderately expensive; for instance a kit lens included in a prosumer camera kit is often marketed as an upgrade lens for a consumer camera. In addition, retailers often have promotions of standalone low-end camera bodies without the lens, or a package that bundles a body with one or two more expensive lenses.

Originally kit lenses were of normal focal length; more recently kit lenses tend to be inexpensive zoom lenses that range from medium wide angle to mid telephoto for added versatility. Prime lenses are generally faster (smaller f-number) than comparably priced zoom lenses, so the change to zoom lenses means that recent kit lenses are usually also slower (higher f-number). However, in most cases the inclusion of an inexpensive zoom lens is to maintain a low entry price and maximize usability for the beginner photographer. More expensive camera bodies are often paired with a likewise more expensive, thus possibly faster, lens.

Originally high end cameras were always sold body-only without a lens as most buyers were experienced users who already had lenses. Today however this is not always the case and even high end cameras can be purchased with a lens, albeit an appropriately higher-quality lens. In these cases the typically uncomplimentary term "kit lens" is somewhat of a misnomer. Sometimes the lens is added by the retailer at a reduced price compared to separate body and lens pricing.

== Mirrorless interchangeable-lens cameras ==
This is a list of the smallest mirrorless camera kit zoom lenses — limit one per brand, lens mount, and sensor size combination. Note that cameras are sometimes kitted with prime lenses, which are not shown here.

Model	Lens mounts	Focal length (Note: 35mm equivalent.)		Aperture		OIS	PZ (Note: Power zoom.)	Weight	Length	Release year	Availability
Model	Lens mounts	Wide	Tele	Wide	Tele	OIS	PZ	Weight	Length	Release year	Availability
1.0-type ("1-inch")
Nikon 10-30mm F3.5-5.6 PD	1	27mm	81mm	f/3.5	f/5.6	Yes	Yes	85g	28mm	2014	Discontinued
Samsung 9-27mm F3.5-5.6	NX-M	24mm	73mm	f/3.5	f/5.6	Yes	No	73g	30mm	2014	Discontinued
Micro Four Thirds
Olympus 14-42mm F3.5-5.6 EZ	MFT	28mm	84mm	f/3.5	f/5.6	No	Yes	93g	23mm	2014	Current
Panasonic 12-32mm F3.5-5.6	MFT	24mm	64mm	f/3.5	f/5.6	Yes	No	70g	24mm	2013	Current
APS-C
Sony 16-50mm F3.5-5.6	E	24mm	75mm	f/3.5	f/5.6	Yes	Yes	116g	30mm	2012	Current
Samsung 16-50mm F3.5-5.6	NX	24mm	75mm	f/3.5	f/5.6	Yes	Yes	111g	31mm	2014	Discontinued
Nikon 16-50mm F3.5-6.3	Z	24mm	75mm	f/3.5	f/6.3	Yes	No	135g	32mm	2019	Current
Panasonic 18-40mm F4.5-6.3	L	27mm	60mm	f/4.5	f/6.3	No	No	155g	41mm	2024	Current
Fujifilm 15-45mm F3.5-5.6	X	23mm	68mm	f/3.5	f/5.6	Yes	Yes	135g	44mm	2018	Current
Canon 18-45mm F4.5-6.3	RF	29mm	72mm	f/4.5	f/6.3	Yes	No	130g	44mm	2022	Current
Canon 15-45mm F3.5-6.3	EF-M	24mm	72mm	f/3.5	f/5.6	Yes	No	130g	45mm	2015	Discontinued
Full frame
Panasonic 18-40mm F4.5-6.3	L	18mm	40mm	f/4.5	f/6.3	No	No	155g	41mm	2024	Current
Sony 28-60mm F4-5.6	E	28mm	60mm	f/4.0	f/5.6	No	No	167g	45mm	2020	Current
Nikon 24-50mm F4-6.3	Z	24mm	50mm	f/4.0	f/6.3	No	No	195g	51mm	2020	Current
Canon 24-50mm F4.5-6.3	RF	24mm	50mm	f/4.5	f/6.3	Yes	No	210g	58mm	2023	Current
Medium format
Fujifilm 35-70mm F4.5-5.6	G	28mm	55mm	f/4.5	f/5.6	No	No	390g	74mm	2021	Current

== Digital single-lens reflex cameras ==
Because of the crop factor, kit lenses for APS-C format cameras (like Canon EF-S and Nikon DX) have shorter focal lengths, to get the same field of view.

=== Canon ===
- Canon EF-S 18–55mm lens: common on consumer-level cameras series (known as Rebel in North America and Kiss in Japan), such as 400D
- Canon EF-S 18–55mm IS lens: Replaced the original 18–55mm on all consumer-level cameras starting from the 450D. It was replaced by an updated version starting with the 600D and 1100D.
- Canon EF-S 18–55mm IS STM lens: Replaced the first 18–55mm IS on all consumer-level cameras starting with the 700D and 100D. A revised version became the standard consumer-level kit lens with the introduction of the 77D and 800D.
- Canon EF-S 17–85mm lens: Canon EOS 20D, Canon EOS 30D, 40D, 50D, optional on 400D
- Canon EF 24–105mm lens: 5D, 5D Mark II, 5D Mark III, Canon 6D
- Canon EF 28–135mm lens: 50D, optional on 7D
- Canon EF 28–105mm lens: Alternative lens
- Canon EF 28–80mm lens: Kit lens for film-body Canon Elan series. The original version of this lens (with metal mount and full-time manual focus) is considered a vastly superior lens to later versions, however both were included as kit lenses.
- Canon EF-S 15–85mm lens: Canon EOS 60D, 7D
- Canon EF-S 18–135mm lens: 550D, 60D, 70D, 7D; optional on 600D
- Canon EF-S 18–135 IS USM lens: Optional on 7D Mark II, 80D, 77D, and 800D.
- Canon EF-S 18–200mm lens: 50D, optional on 60D

Canon have also marketed twin lens kits, typically with the non IS version of the Canon EF-S 18-55mm lenses and

- Canon EF 55-200mm lens: A now discontinued lens supplied with earlier cameras such as the 350D.
- Canon EF 75-300mm lens: Supplied with later cameras such as the 500D.

=== Nikon ===
- AF-S DX Nikkor 18-105mm f/3.5-5.6G SWM IF-ED VR (as of August 2008, Nikon D90)
- AF-S DX Nikkor 18-135mm f/3.5-5.6G SWM IF-ED (as of September 2006, Nikon D80)
- Nikon AF-S DX Nikkor 18-140mm f/3.5-5.6G ED VR (with Nikon D5300, D5500)
- Nikkor 18-55mm DX f/3.5-5.6G, various versions:
  - AF-S DX Nikkor 18-55mm f/3.5-5.6G (as of April 2005, Nikon D50)
  - AF-S DX Nikkor 18-55mm f/3.5-5.6G II (as of November 2006, Nikon D40 and D40x)
  - AF-S DX Nikkor 18-55mm f/3.5-5.6G VR (as of November 2007, low end entry level DSLRs)
  - AF-S DX Nikkor 18-55mm f/3.5-5.6G VR II (as of January, 2014, low end entry-level DSLRs)
  - AF-P DX Nikkor 18-55mm f/3.5-5.6G VR (as of January, 2014, low end entry-level DSLRs)
- Nikon Nikkor AF-S 55-200mm f/4-5.6 ED VR (with Nikon D5000, D3100)
- Nikon AF-S Nikkor 16-80mm f/2.8-4E ED VR (with Nikon D500)
- Nikon AF-S Nikkor 24-85mm f/3.5-4.5G ED AF-S VR (with Nikon D600)
- Nikon AF-S Nikkor 24-120mm f/4G ED VR (with Nikon D750, D780)
- Nikon AF-S Nikkor 70-300mm f/4.5-5.6G VR (with Nikon D610)
- Nikon AF-S 18-70mm f/3.5-4.5G ED-IF DX Zoom-Nikkor (Nikon D70)
- AF Nikkor 28-80mm f/3.3-5.6G (late 90s film SLRs and early 2000s, such as the Nikon F75 and Nikon N80)
- Nikon 50mm F1.8 Series E (older 70s and 80s film cameras, such as the Nikon EM)
- Nikon 50mm F1.8G SE (with Nikon Df body)
- Nikon 35-70mm f/3.3-4.5 AF (early AF cameras such as the N4004)

=== Pentax ===
- SMC DA 18-55mm f/3.5-5.6 AL: bundled with Pentax K10D, K100D, K110D, and K100D Super.
- SMC DA 18-55mm f/3.5-5.6 AL II: updated version, bundled with K20D and K200D.
- SMC DA L 18-55mm f/3.5-5.6 AL: plastic mount version, bundled with K-x and K-r.
- SMC DA 18-55mm f/3.5-5.6 AL WR: weather-resistant version, bundled with K-7, K-5.
- SMC DA L 18-50mm F4-5.6 DC WR RE; plastic mount version of HD Pentax-DA 18-50mm F4-5.6 DC WR RE, bundled with K-S2
- SMC DA 18-135mm f/3.5-5.6 ED AL DC WR: weather-resistant version, bundled with K-5 and K-30 and K-r.
- SMC DA 40mm f/2.8 XS: pancake, bundled with K-01.
- SMC DA L 50-200mm f/4.0-5.6 ED: plastic mount version, bundled with K-r and K-x.
- SMC DA 50-200mm f/4.0-5.6 ED WR: weather-resistant version, bundled with K-5 and K-30.

=== Sony ===
- Sony DT 18-70mm f/3.5-5.6: bundled with Sony α 100, Sony α 200.Sony α 300, Sony α 350.
- Sony DT 18-55mm f/3.5-5.6 SAM, bundled with Sony A230, A330, A380, A33, A35, A55, A65.
- Sony DT 16-105 f/3.5-5.6: A700
- Sony DT 16–50 f/2.8: A77

=== Olympus ===
- Zuiko Digital 14-42mm f/3.5-5.6 (a.k.a. short kit)
- Zuiko Digital 40-150mm f/4.0-5.6 (a.k.a. long kit)

== Analog single-lens reflex cameras ==
=== Olympus ===
- Zuiko 50mm f/1.8 for all manual focus Olympus OMs
- Zuiko 50mm f/2.0 PF for Olympus OM-101

== See also ==
- Pancake lens
- Standard zoom lens
