= Pentax K-5 II =

Camera

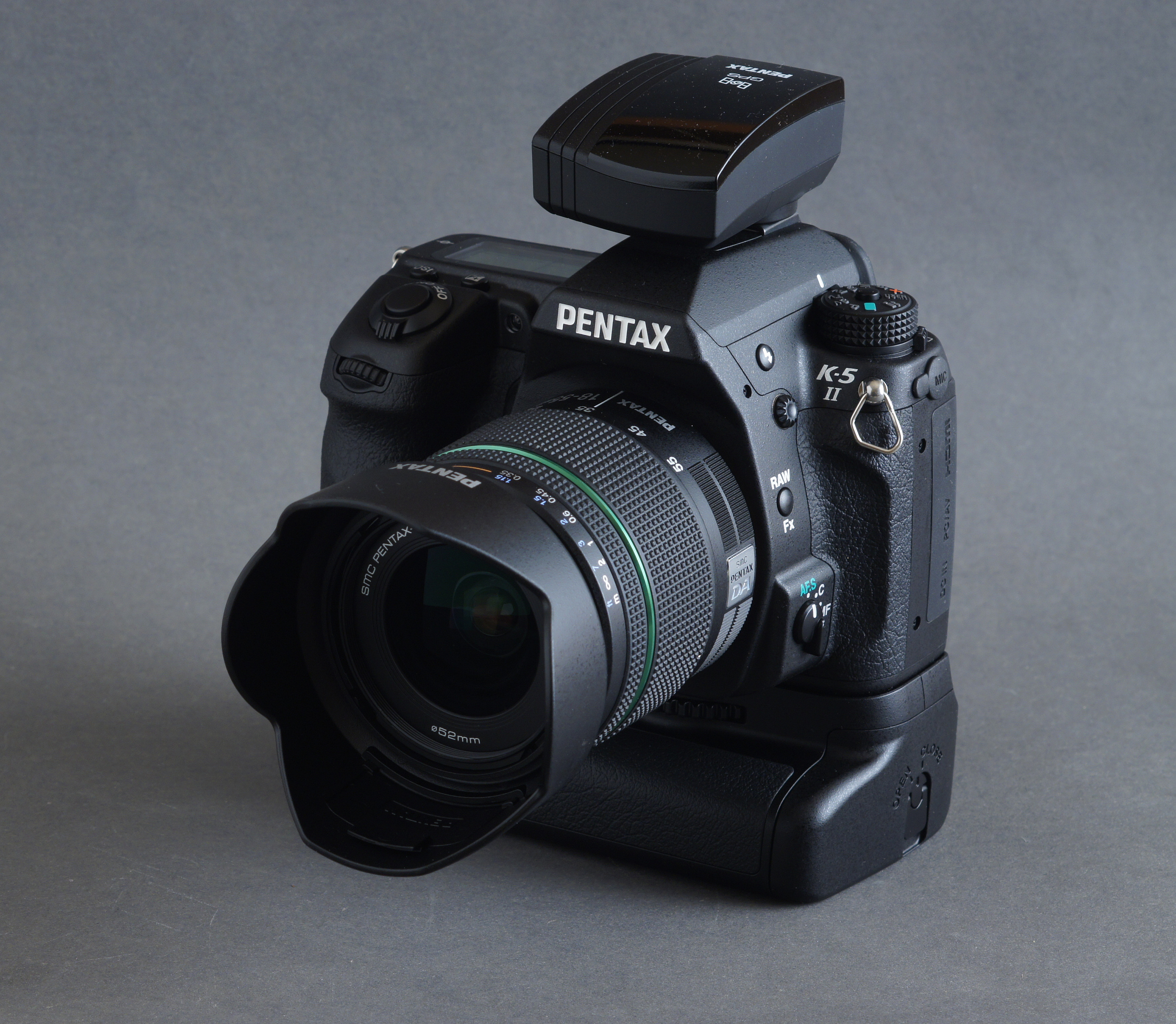
- K-5 II with optional GPS unit and battery grip

Overview
- Maker: Hoya Corporation
- Type: Digital single-lens reflex camera

Lens
- Lens: Interchangeable Pentax K_{AF3} and K_{AF2} mount compatible with Pentax auto-aperture lenses; older lenses supported in stop-down metering mode

Sensor/medium
- Sensor: APS-C 23.7×15.7 mm CMOS sensor
- Maximum resolution: 16.3 megapixels (4928×3264)
- Film speed: ISO 100–12,800 in 1, 1/2, or 1/3 EV steps; expandable to ISO 80–51,200
- Recording medium: SD, SDHC, SDXC and, according to one source, microSD

Exposure/metering
- Exposure modes: Green (fully automatic), program, aperture priority, shutter priority, sensitivity priority, aperture and shutter priority, manual, bulb, X-sync shutter speed, five User presets.
- Exposure metering: TTL open-aperture metering, 77 segments
- Metering modes: Multi-segment, Center-weighted, Spot

Flash
- Flash: Onboard pop-up flash; hot shoe for P-TTL flash units with high-speed sync support; PC socket for studio flashes; 1/180 s X-sync speed

Shutter
- Shutter speed range: 30–1/8000 s, Bulb
- Continuous shooting: Up to 7 fps

Viewfinder
- Viewfinder: Eye-level pentaprism, near-100% coverage, 0.92× magnification

Image processing
- Image processor: Prime II

General
- LCD screen: 3″, 921,000 dots (640×480 RGB pixels)
- Battery: D-LI90 lithium-ion rechargeable battery
- Optional battery packs: D-BG4 battery grip accepts additional D-LI90 battery or 6 AA batteries
- Weight: With battery: 760 g (1.68 lb)

The Pentax K-5 II is a 16.3-megapixel digital single-lens reflex camera, successor to the Pentax K-5, sharing its body shape with its two predecessors including the Pentax K-7, and making incremental improvements on the K-5.

Both models have improved autofocus ability, particularly in low and tungsten light, down to −3EV, which at the time of release makes it the best low-light autofocus camera. Also improved is the sensitivity of the central AF area which now has an AF base of f/2.8 instead of the common f/5.6. This increased AF base length helps to improve focus accuracy, in particular with fast (wide aperture) lenses and in low light.

The Pentax K-5 II/IIs each have HD video capabilities, with resolutions of 1920×1080 (at 25 fps), 1280×720 (at 25 & 30 fps), 640×480 (at 25 & 30 fps).

Externally, the cameras are distinguished by a recessed screen, where the K-5 had a flush-mounted one. The K-5II/IIs has a gapless design—the typical air gap is avoided by the use of a special resin—helps to reduce internal reflections and gives better visibility in bright light. The material of the screen has been changed from plastic to tempered glass, which is scratch resistant. Like its predecessor, the K-5 II/IIs is fully weather-sealed.

It has the highest camera sensor rating of any Pentax APS-C camera, according to DxO Labs, with a score of 82.

== Pentax K-5 IIs ==
The Pentax K-5 IIs is a version of the K-5 II which omits the traditional low pass filter for greater sharpness but potentially greater moiré.

== Bundling ==
The K-5 II/IIs are available in two different kits, one including the DA 18–55 mm WR lens, and the other the DA 18–135 mm WR lens, as well as a body only.

Type	Sensor	Class	2003	2004	2005	2006		2007	2008	2009	2010	2011	2012	2013	2014	2015	2016	2017	2018	2019	2020	2021	2022	2023	2024	2025
DSLR	MF	Professional										645D				645Z										
DSLR	FF	Professional																K-1		K-1 II						
DSLR	APS-C	High-end															K-3 II						K-3 III			
DSLR	APS-C	High-end													K-3											
DSLR	APS-C	Advanced									K-7	K-5		K-5 II / K-5 IIs												
DSLR	APS-C	Advanced		*ist D			K10D		K20D									KP								
DSLR	APS-C	Midrange					K100D	100DS	K200D					K-30	K-50			K-70						KF		
DSLR	APS-C	Entry-level			*ist DS	*ist DS2						K-r			K-500	K-S2										
DSLR	APS-C	Entry-level			*ist DL	DL2	K110D			K-m/K2000	K-x					K-S1										
MILC	APS-C	K-mount											K-01													
MILC	1/1.7"	Q-mount													Q7											
MILC	1/1.7"	Q-mount														Q-S1										
MILC	1/2.3"	Q-mount											Q	Q10												
DSLR	Prototypes		MZ-D (2000); 645D Prototype (2006); AP 50th Anniv. (2007)																							
Type	Sensor	Class																								
Type	Sensor	Class	2003	2004	2005	2006		2007	2008	2009	2010	2011	2012	2013	2014	2015	2016	2017	2018	2019	2020	2021	2022	2023	2024	2025
