= Pentax K-S2 =

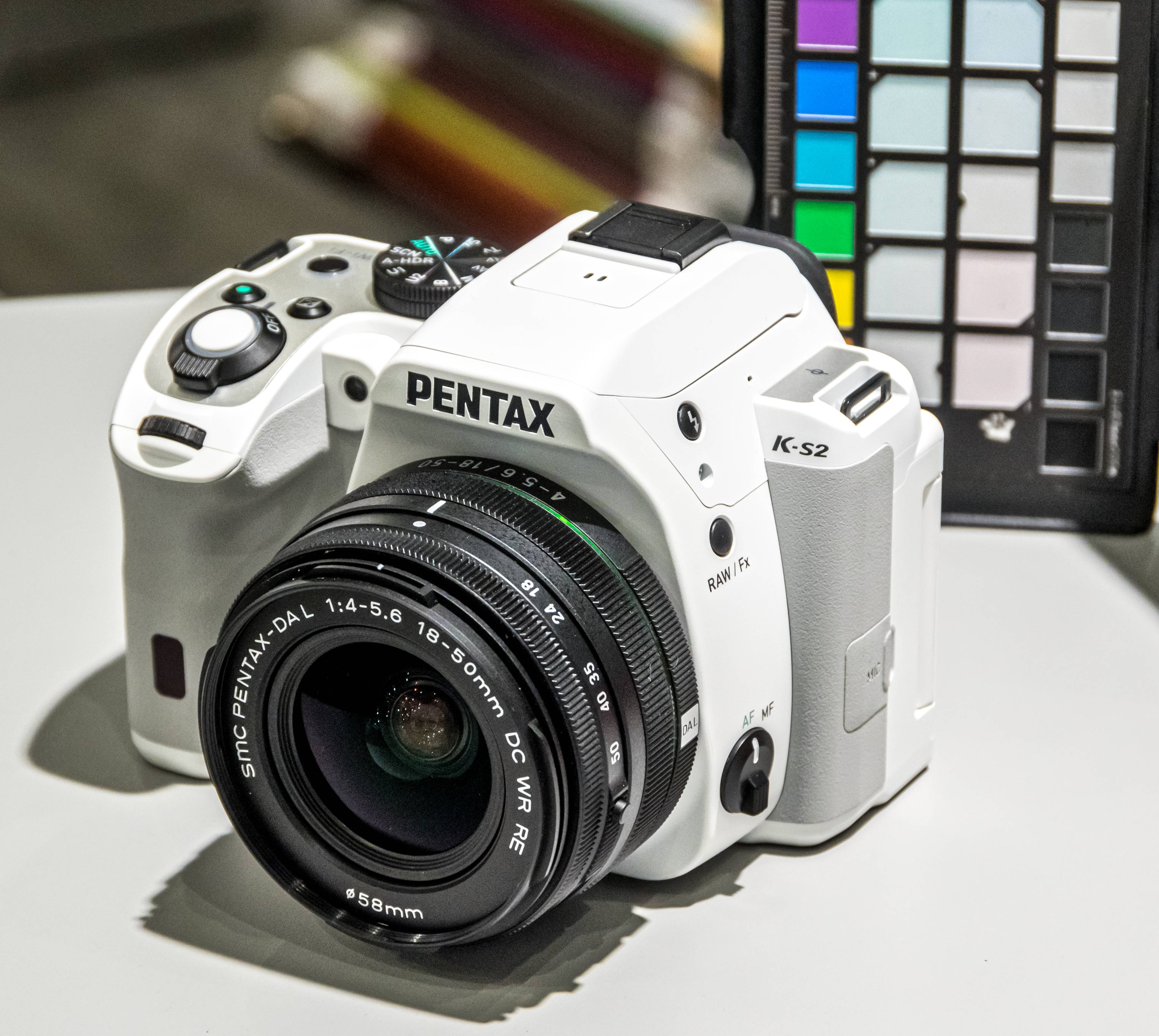

Overview
- Maker: Ricoh

Lens
- Lens mount: Pentax KAF2

Sensor/medium
- Sensor type: CMOS
- Sensor size: 23.5 x 15.6mm (APS-C type)
- Maximum resolution: 20 megapixels (5472x3648)
- Recording medium: SD, SDHC or SDXC card

Focusing
- Focus areas: 11 focus points

Shutter
- Shutter speeds: 1/6000s to 30s
- Continuous shooting: 5.4 frames per second

Viewfinder
- Viewfinder magnification: 0.95
- Frame coverage: 100%

Image processing
- Image processor: PRIME MII
- White balance: Yes

General
- LCD screen: 3 inches with 921,000 dots
- Dimensions: 91 x 123 x 73mm (3.58 x 4.84 x 2.87 inches)
- Weight: 678 g (24 oz)including battery

The Pentax K-S2 is a weather-sealed digital SLR camera announced by Ricoh on February 9, 2015. It is the first Pentax SLR to feature an articulated LCD, and it is the smallest DSLR to include this feature and also be weather-sealed. In 2015, the K-S2 won the TIPA Award in the category Best Digital SLR Advanced.

Its release is also the debut of a new retractable kit lens that it will be bundled with, the SMC Pentax-DA L 18-50mm f/4-5.6 DC WR RE - Pentax' second kit lens after the 18-135mm model to have a "silent" focus motor.

The K-S2 also does not have an AA filter which increases sharpness but makes it more susceptible to moiré. The K-S2 comes in 7 color combinations.

It has been in limited availability in North America and other markets since Summer of 2017, but was still an active product on the Ricoh Imaging, Japan Web site as of 5 December 2017; the slightly more advanced K-70 would be the nearest replacement model.

Type	Sensor	Class	2003	2004	2005	2006		2007	2008	2009	2010	2011	2012	2013	2014	2015	2016	2017	2018	2019	2020	2021	2022	2023	2024	2025
DSLR	MF	Professional										645D				645Z										
DSLR	FF	Professional																K-1		K-1 II						
DSLR	APS-C	High-end															K-3 II						K-3 III			
DSLR	APS-C	High-end													K-3											
DSLR	APS-C	Advanced									K-7	K-5		K-5 II / K-5 IIs												
DSLR	APS-C	Advanced		*ist D			K10D		K20D									KP								
DSLR	APS-C	Midrange					K100D	100DS	K200D					K-30	K-50			K-70						KF		
DSLR	APS-C	Entry-level			*ist DS	*ist DS2						K-r			K-500	K-S2										
DSLR	APS-C	Entry-level			*ist DL	DL2	K110D			K-m/K2000	K-x					K-S1										
MILC	APS-C	K-mount											K-01													
MILC	1/1.7"	Q-mount													Q7											
MILC	1/1.7"	Q-mount														Q-S1										
MILC	1/2.3"	Q-mount											Q	Q10												
DSLR	Prototypes		MZ-D (2000); 645D Prototype (2006); AP 50th Anniv. (2007)																							
Type	Sensor	Class																								
Type	Sensor	Class	2003	2004	2005	2006		2007	2008	2009	2010	2011	2012	2013	2014	2015	2016	2017	2018	2019	2020	2021	2022	2023	2024	2025
