= Pentax K-x =

2009 APS-C digital single-lens reflex camera

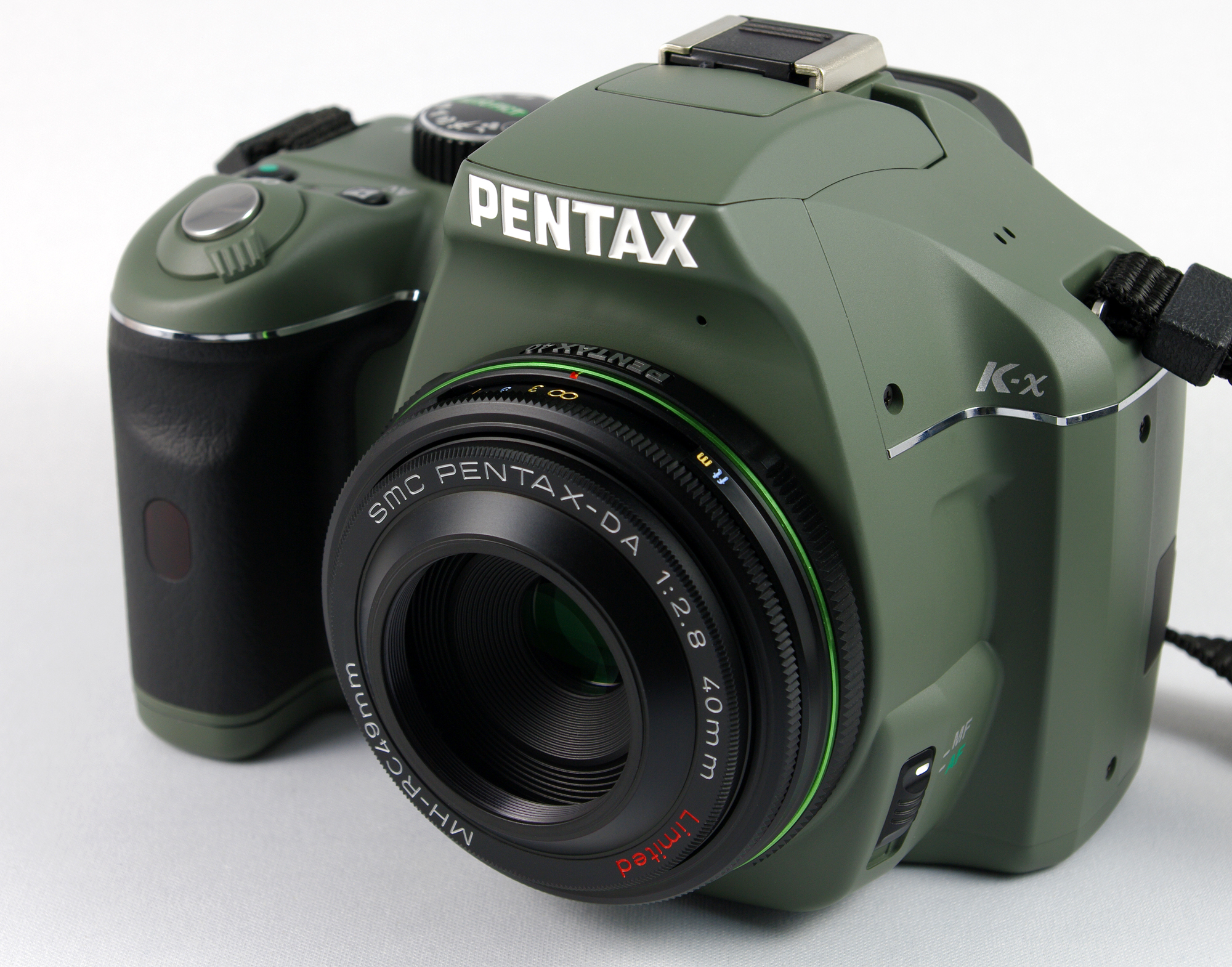

Overview
- Maker: Pentax
- Type: Digital single-lens reflex camera

Lens
- Lens: Interchangeable Pentax K_{AF2} mount compatible with Pentax auto-aperture lenses and SDM lenses; older lenses supported in stop-down metering mode.

Sensor/medium
- Sensor: 23.6 × 15.8 mm CMOS image sensor with a primary color filter
- Maximum resolution: 12.4 megapixels
- Film speed: ISO Auto, 200, 400, 800, 1600, 3200, 6400 (100, 12800 with expansion)
- Recording medium: SD, SDHC, SDXC

Exposure/metering
- Exposure modes: Program, Shutter-Speed Priority, Aperture Priority, Manual, Bulb, Auto, Picture modes (Standard, Portrait, Landscape, Macro, Action, Night scene portrait, Standard flash-off)
- Exposure metering: TTL open-aperture metering with choice of: 16-segment, Center-weighted & Spot meter

Shutter
- Shutter speed range: 1/6000 sec – 30 sec, Bulb

Viewfinder
- Viewfinder: Eye-level pentamirror, 96% coverage, 0.85x magnification

General
- LCD screen: 2.7", 230,000 pixels
- Battery: AA (×4), Optional AC adapter
- Weight: 515 g (18.2 oz) without battery
- Made in: Philippines

The Pentax K-x is a 12.4 megapixel digital single-lens reflex camera, which was announced on September 16, 2009. The Pentax K-x uses a Sony Exmor sensor (different from the back-lit Exmor-R used in other Sony models). In some cases it even approaches the quality produced by full-frame DSLRs like the Nikon D700 and the Canon 5DMkII, both with larger sensors. The Pentax K-x is suitable for low light conditions for both still and video photography.

The K-x is a compact model above the entry-level K2000/K-m. It is lighter than other Pentax DSLRs, including the K2000, and lacks the weather sealing of the K10D, K200D, K20D, and K-7, and is intended to be sold with lightweight DA-L-series lenses. It offers some improvements over the high-end K-7, including a maximum sensitivity of ISO12800 with lower noise than comparable cameras and even than some of higher class, a maximum shutter speed improved to 1/6000 s, and a faster burst mode of 4.7 frame/s. DPReview.com has observed that the K-x offers many of the same features as the K-7 features in what is essentially the same body as the K2000

The K-x also offers a large range of body colors compared to the traditional black DSLR body. In Japan, up to 100 color combinations are available.

The Pentax K-x won the Technical Image Press Association (TIPA) award for Best DSLR Entry Level in Europe 2010 and Time Magazine listed the Pentax K-x in its Best Travel Gadgets of 2009 list.

The Pentax K-x is often sold packaged with the DA-L 18-55mm f/3.5-5.6 kit lens.

Other features:

- Live preview
- HD 720p video at 24 frame/s
- In-body stabilization
- HDR (high-dynamic-range) image capture

The K-x was discontinued in March, 2011, shortly after the Pentax K-r was introduced. Also introduced at a similar price was the mirrorless Pentax K-01.

== In-body stabilization ==
The Pentax K-x includes in-body stabilization for shake reduction, similar to the Sony Optical Steady-Shot system.

The Shake Reduction function automatically turns off in the following situations.

- Self-Timer
- Remote control shooting
- Bulb shooting
- HDR Capture

== High-dynamic-range imaging (HDR) ==
HDR takes three frames of different exposure and combines them into a single jpeg image while turning off the shake reduction.

This essentially means tripod only shots in most cases while trying to minimize any movement.

Self timer would be the ideal method but unfortunately the Pentax K-x HDR feature cannot be used with the camera's self timer as it is not enabled in Firmware 1.01 and 1.02 for reasons unknown.

This lack of timer "drive mode" can be compensated for with a Pentax IR remote and remote "drive mode" selection.

== AA battery life ==
There are many reports that using 4xAA rechargeable Sanyo Eneloop batteries will give ~500–1000 photos on a single charge with firmware 1.01 depending on usage.

In a test of different compatible AA batteries:

- Lithium took 1900 photos and 1100 with 50% flash
- Ni-MH 1900mAh took 640 photos and 420 with 50% flash
- Alkaline took 210 photos and 130 with 50% flash

The biggest effect on battery life is using LiveView and Video.

== RAW formats ==
The camera can shoot RAW images using either the Pentax PEF format or the open standard Adobe Digital negative (DNG). Shooting RAW and a JPEG at the same time is also possible.

== Video function ==
The camera is capable of recording HD video files which made it quite popular for some independent filmmakers. The camera is using the "DV codec alike" MJPEG codec, which is a very soft compression that creates relatively huge video files but on the other hand allows editing of this video files even on older editing systems with less CPU power. The advantage of this compression method is that it saves every single frame as a progressive frame and is (compared to AVCHD) not only saving the changes inside the group of pictures.

Videos can be recorded either in HD (1280x720p) or SD (640x416), both with 24 frame/s. They are stored as AVI files.

The sound of the videos are all uncompressed PCM 32 kHz, 16 bit. If sound is not needed for video recordings, it can be deactivated and silent videos can be recorded.

There are some limits for the length of a single video. At the very least, there is a limitation on the file size for each video file, which is 4 GB (the maximum file size that is allowed by the FAT32 format of the SDHC cards). But it is possible that a video will not reach 4 GB because it will be limited by excessive sensor heat (usually after 12 minutes of continuous video shooting). Depleted batteries or a full memory card may also interfere with video length.

== Firmware ==
The Pentax K-x firmware updates have added functionality and fixed a few issues.

- Improved reliability of recording operation when using SDXC memory card. (v 1.03)
- Compatible with SDXC memory card. (v 1.02)
- Added three kinds of particular effect shooting function (Pre-set 1,2 and 3) on [Cross Processing]. (v 1.01)
- Added assignment of Cross Processing function to the green button. (v 1.01)
- Improved accuracy of Battery Level Indicator under specific conditions and improved stability for general performance. (v 1.01)

== See also ==
Type	Sensor	Class	2003	2004	2005	2006		2007	2008	2009	2010	2011	2012	2013	2014	2015	2016	2017	2018	2019	2020	2021	2022	2023	2024	2025
DSLR	MF	Professional										645D				645Z										
DSLR	FF	Professional																K-1		K-1 II						
DSLR	APS-C	High-end															K-3 II						K-3 III			
DSLR	APS-C	High-end													K-3											
DSLR	APS-C	Advanced									K-7	K-5		K-5 II / K-5 IIs												
DSLR	APS-C	Advanced		*ist D			K10D		K20D									KP								
DSLR	APS-C	Midrange					K100D	100DS	K200D					K-30	K-50			K-70						KF		
DSLR	APS-C	Entry-level			*ist DS	*ist DS2						K-r			K-500	K-S2										
DSLR	APS-C	Entry-level			*ist DL	DL2	K110D			K-m/K2000	K-x					K-S1										
MILC	APS-C	K-mount											K-01													
MILC	1/1.7"	Q-mount													Q7											
MILC	1/1.7"	Q-mount														Q-S1										
MILC	1/2.3"	Q-mount											Q	Q10												
DSLR	Prototypes		MZ-D (2000); 645D Prototype (2006); AP 50th Anniv. (2007)																							
Type	Sensor	Class																								
Type	Sensor	Class	2003	2004	2005	2006		2007	2008	2009	2010	2011	2012	2013	2014	2015	2016	2017	2018	2019	2020	2021	2022	2023	2024	2025
