= Pentax K-30 =

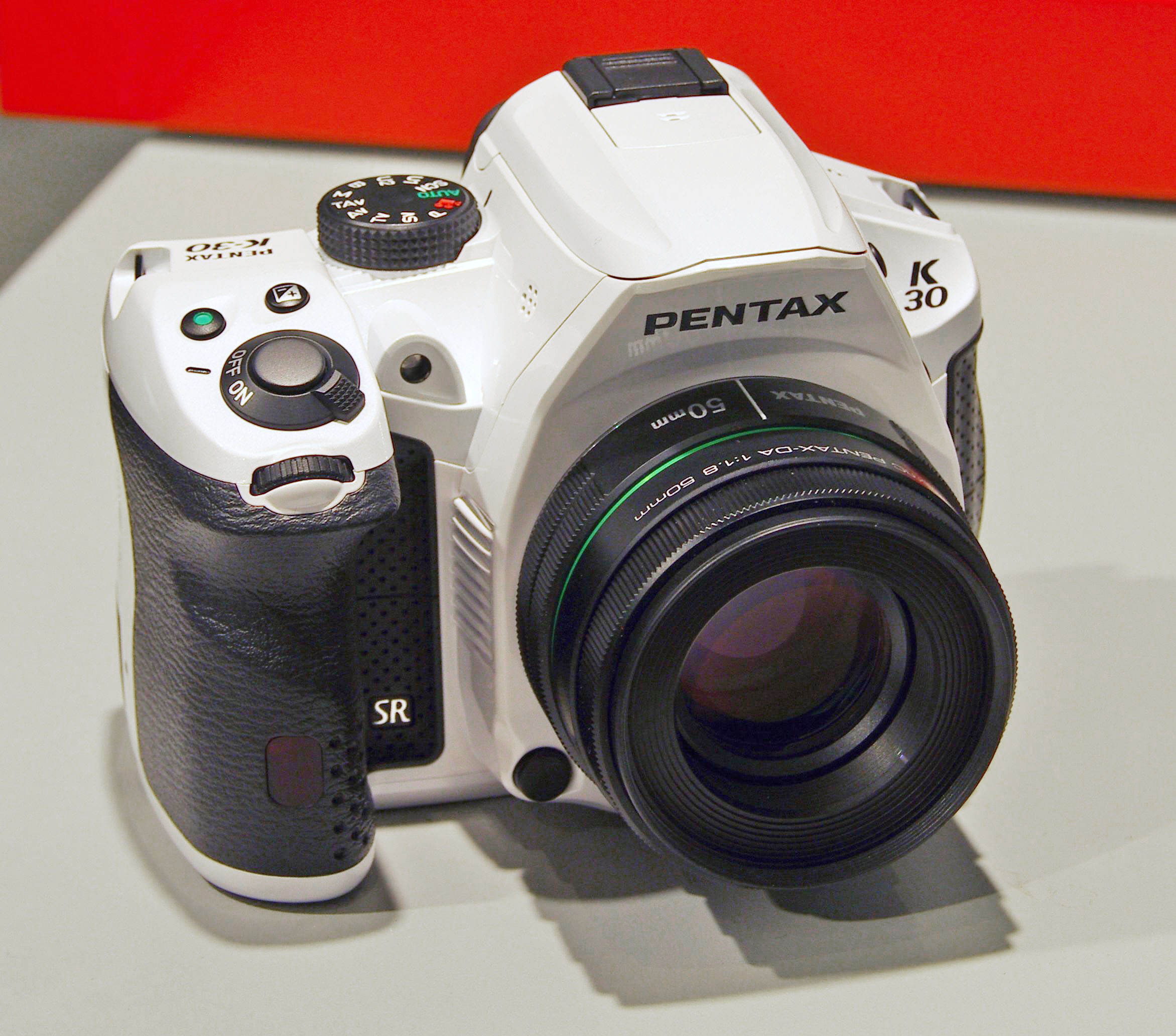
- Pentax K-30 with DA-L 50 mm lens

Overview
- Maker: Pentax
- Type: Digital single-lens reflex camera

Lens
- Lens mount: Interchangeable Pentax K_{AF3} and K_{AF2} mount compatible with Pentax auto-aperture lenses; older lenses supported in stop-down metering mode

Sensor/medium
- Sensor: APS-C 23.7×15.7 mm CMOS sensor
- Maximum resolution: 16.3 million effective pixels
- Film speed: ISO 100–12,800 in 1, 0.5 or 0.3 EV steps. Extendable from ISO 100–25,600
- Recording medium: SD, SDHC, SDXC

Exposure/metering
- Exposure metering: TTL open-aperture metering with choice of: 77-segment, Center-weighted & Spot meter

Flash
- Flash: Built-in retractable P-TTL auto pop-up flash. 1/180 sec X-sync speed.

Shutter
- Shutter speed range: 30-1/6000 s, Bulb

Viewfinder
- Viewfinder: Eye-level pentaprism, near-100% coverage, 0.92x magnification

Image processing
- Image processor: PRIME M

General
- LCD screen: 3", 921k pixels with AR coating, adjustable for brightness and colour
- Battery: Lithium-Ion D-LI109 rechargeable battery or four AA batteries (with optional AA battery holder)
- Weight: With battery and SD card: 650 g (1.43 lb); Without battery: 590 g (1.30 lb)
- Made in: Philippines

The Pentax K-30 is a 16.3-megapixel Pentax digital single-lens reflex camera, announced on 21 May 2012. At its introduction, it was in the middle of Pentax's DSLR range, above the now-discontinued entry-level K-r, and below the semi-pro K-5 and successor K-5 II.

== Overview ==
It has a stainless steel chassis, and unlike most DSLRs of its class, is fully weather sealed. It can shoot continuously at up to 6 frames per second with a maximum shutter speed of 1/6000th of a second. It can capture video at 1080p at either 30, 25, or 24 fps. Like all current and recent Pentax dSLRs it features in-body shake reduction, removing the need for each lens to have image stabilisation. The Pentax K mount allows use of legacy lenses dating back to the 1970s, or even earlier with an M42-mount adapter, for which the K-mount is fully compatible. The autofocus system (SAFOX IXi+) is an advance over the K-5 and features 11 AF points, 9 of which are cross-type (i.e. sensitive to vertical as well as horizontal edges). For maximum flexibility, the camera can either use the proprietary supplied lithium battery, or, with an optional adapter, use the universally available AA battery type.

Type	Sensor	Class	2003	2004	2005	2006		2007	2008	2009	2010	2011	2012	2013	2014	2015	2016	2017	2018	2019	2020	2021	2022	2023	2024	2025
DSLR	MF	Professional										645D				645Z										
DSLR	FF	Professional																K-1		K-1 II						
DSLR	APS-C	High-end															K-3 II						K-3 III			
DSLR	APS-C	High-end													K-3											
DSLR	APS-C	Advanced									K-7	K-5		K-5 II / K-5 IIs												
DSLR	APS-C	Advanced		*ist D			K10D		K20D									KP								
DSLR	APS-C	Midrange					K100D	100DS	K200D					K-30	K-50			K-70						KF		
DSLR	APS-C	Entry-level			*ist DS	*ist DS2						K-r			K-500	K-S2										
DSLR	APS-C	Entry-level			*ist DL	DL2	K110D			K-m/K2000	K-x					K-S1										
MILC	APS-C	K-mount											K-01													
MILC	1/1.7"	Q-mount													Q7											
MILC	1/1.7"	Q-mount														Q-S1										
MILC	1/2.3"	Q-mount											Q	Q10												
DSLR	Prototypes		MZ-D (2000); 645D Prototype (2006); AP 50th Anniv. (2007)																							
Type	Sensor	Class																								
Type	Sensor	Class	2003	2004	2005	2006		2007	2008	2009	2010	2011	2012	2013	2014	2015	2016	2017	2018	2019	2020	2021	2022	2023	2024	2025
