= Pentax DA 18-135mm lens =

SMC Pentax-DA 18-135mm f/3.5-5.6 ED AL [IF] DC WR
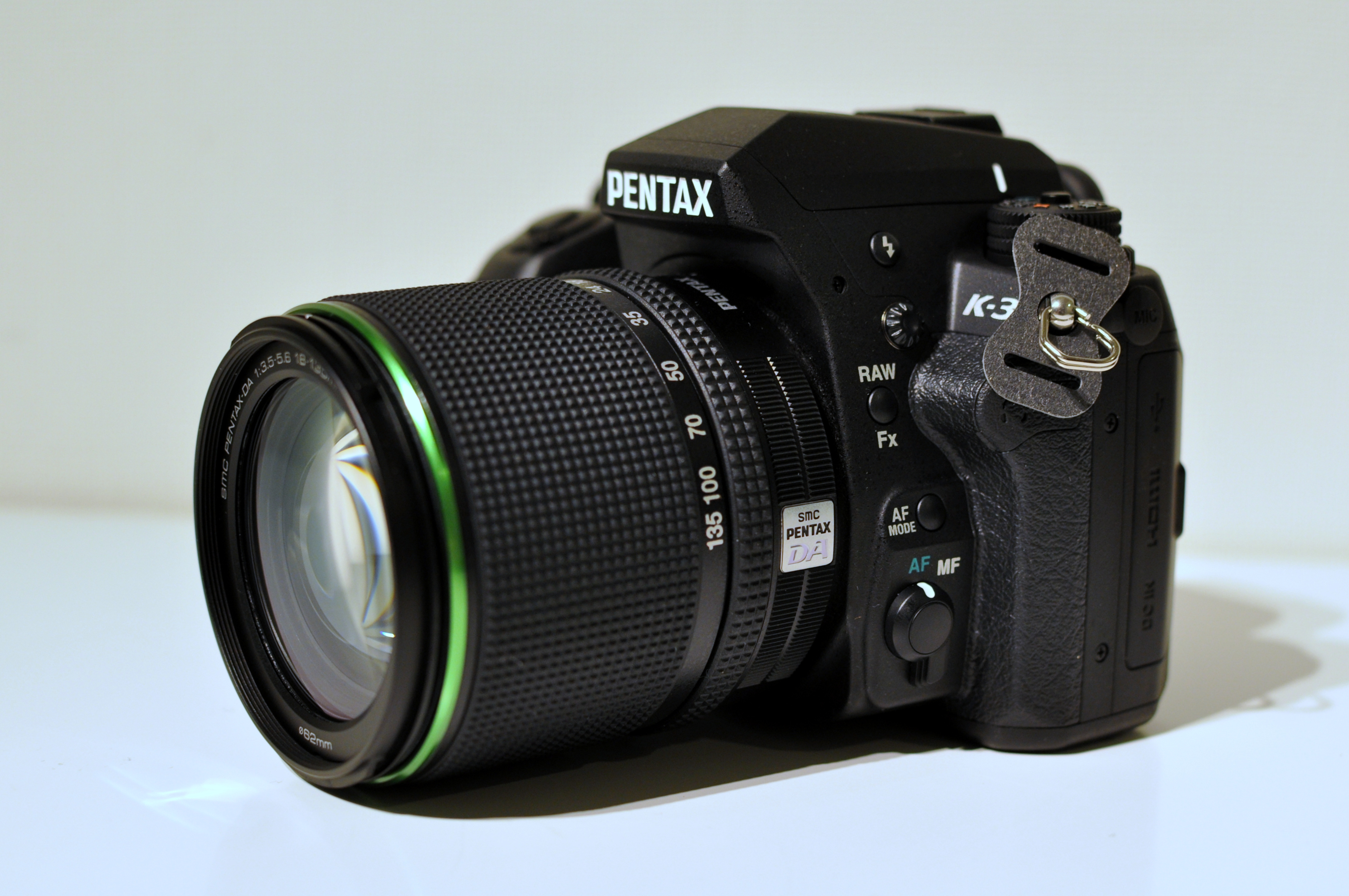
- Mounted on a Pentax K-3
- Maker: Pentax
- Lens mount(s): Pentax K mount

Technical data
- Type: Zoom
- Focus drive: Brushless DC motor
- Focal length: 18-135mm
- Focal length (35mm equiv.): 27.5-207mm
- Crop factor: 1.5
- Aperture (max/min): f/3.5-5.6 / f/22-38
- Close focus distance: 0.40 metres (16 in)
- Max. magnification: 0.24x
- Diaphragm blades: 7
- Construction: 13 elements in 11 groups

Features
- Manual focus override: Yes Yes
- Weather-sealing: Yes Yes
- Application: Standard zoom

Physical
- Weight: 405 grams (14.3 oz)
- Filter diameter: 62mm

Accessories
- Lens hood: PH-RBC62mm

Angle of view
- Diagonal: 76°-11.9°

History
- Introduction: 2010

Retail info
- MSRP: 499 USD

The smc Pentax-DA 18-135mm f/3.5-5.6 ED AL [IF] DC WR is an APS-C standard zoom and high-end kit lens for Pentax DSLRs, introduced in September 2010. As a kit lens, it was the higher-end option for the Pentax K-5, as an alternative to the lower priced SMC Pentax-DA 18-55mm f/3.5-5.6 AL WR, and has continued in that role with subsequent Pentax DSLR models. It is also compatible with the K-01 mirrorless camera.
