= Konica Minolta AF Zoom DT 18-70mm f/3.5-5.6 (D) =

Konica Minolta AF Zoom DT 18-70mm f/3.5-5.6 (D) (2697-810)
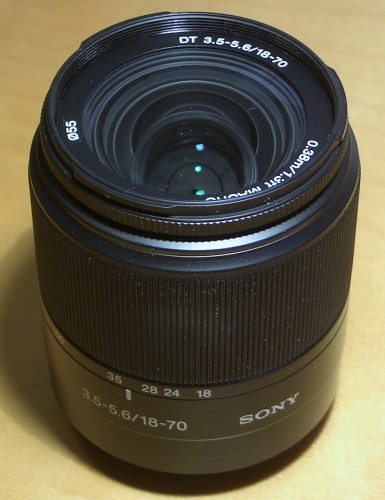
- Sony α DT 18-70mm f/3.5-5.6 lens
- Maker: Konica Minolta, Sony

Technical data
- Type: Zoom
- Focal length: 18-70mm
- Crop factor: 100.4°-23°
- Aperture (max/min): f/3.5-5.6 - f/22-36
- Close focus distance: 380 mm
- Max. magnification: 1/4
- Diaphragm blades: 7, circular
- Construction: 11 elements in 9 groups

Features
- Short back focus: No
- Ultrasonic motor: No
- Lens-based stabilization: No
- Macro capable: Yes
- Application: Kit lens for Sony α100, 200, 300, 350, 700

Physical
- Max. length: 97.0 mm
- Diameter: 66.0 mm
- Weight: 235 g
- Filter diameter: 55 mm

Accessories
- Lens hood: bayonet, flower

History
- Introduction: 2005 Konica Minolta, 2006 Sony
- Discontinuation: 2006 Konica Minolta
- Successor: Sony α DT 18-70mm f/3.5-5.6 (SAL-1870)

Retail info
- MSRP: 200 USD (as of 2006)

Originally produced as Konica Minolta AF Zoom DT 18-70mm f/3.5-5.6 (D) by Konica Minolta, and later produced by Sony, the Sony α DT 18-70mm f/3.5-5.6 (SAL-1870), is a photographic lens compatible with cameras using the Minolta A-mount and Sony A-mount lens mounts. The DT designation means this lens is designed to be used with a camera with an APS-C size sensor. When the 1.5× crop factor is considered, the lens has an effective equivalent 27–105mm focal length.

This lens was often sold as a kit lens with the Sony DSLR-A100K, DSLR-A100W, DSLR-A200K, DSLR-A200W, DSLR-A300K, DSLR-A350W and DSLR-A700K kits. It was superseded by the SAL-1855 lens with the launch of the DSLT system in 2010.

== See also ==
- List of Konica Minolta A-mount lenses
- List of Minolta A-mount lenses

== Sources ==
- Technical specs and user reviews on dyxum.com
