= List of Konica Minolta A-mount lenses =

List of Konica Minolta A-mount lenses:

Minolta A-mount lenses (Note: All lenses are designed cover the 35mm format with the exception of the "DT" lenses (11–18, 18–70 and 18–200), which cover APS-C.)
FL (mm)	Ap	Name	MPN	Lens ID	Mount	Filter	Distance encoder (Note: Lenses with a "distance encoder" provide subject distance information for utilization in the Advanced Distance Integration (ADI) flash mode and other features. While the "(D)" designation is used on the box and in the documentation, the lenses just feature a "D" instead. Requires 8 lens contacts; lenses with only 5 contacts cannot support this feature.)	AF-D support	Aberration correction	Release date	Comments													
Prime lenses
Fisheye lenses
Konica Minolta AF 35mm f/1.4 G (D)	?	43	8-pin	55mm	Yes	Camera (since 2013-02-05)	Camera	N/A (2005-07)	Prototype only; revised optics; succeeded by Sony SAL-35F14G															
11–18	f/4.5–5.6	Konica Minolta AF Zoom DT 11-18mm f/4.5-5.6 (D) (Note: DT is "Digital Technology", lenses for cameras with APS-C (or Super-35mm) size sensors, only. DT lenses will not fully illuminate the sensor/film area of 24×36mm full-frame cameras. Three DT lenses were made and sold by Konica Minolta: 11–18, 18–70, and 18–200mm.)	2698-110	41	8-pin	77mm	Yes	No	No	2005	Derivation of Tamron SP AF 11-18mm f/4.5-5.6 Di II LD Aspherical [IF] (model A13M) design; succeeded by Sony SAL-1118													
17–35	f/2.8–4	Konica Minolta AF Zoom 17-35mm f/2.8-4 (D)	2695-110	38	8-pin	77mm	Yes	No	No	2004	Derivation of Tamron SP AF 17-35mm f/2.8-4 Di LD Aspherical [IF] (model A05M) design; black finish	18–70	f/3.5–5.6	Konica Minolta AF Zoom DT 18-70mm f/3.5-5.6 (D)	2697-810	40	8-pin	55mm	Yes	No	No	2005	Succeeded by Sony SAL-1870	
17–35	18–200	f/3.5–6.3	Konica Minolta AF Zoom DT 18-200mm f/3.5-6.3 (D)	2699-110	42	8-pin	62mm	Yes	No	No	2005	Derivation of Tamron AF 18-200mm f/3.5-6.3 XR Di II LD Aspherical [IF] (model A14M) design; succeeded by Sony SAL-18200	28–75	f/2.8	Konica Minolta AF Zoom 28-75mm f/2.8 (D)	2696-810	39	8-pin	67mm	Yes	No	No	2004	Derivation of Tamron SP AF 28-75mm f/2.8 XR Di LD Aspherical [IF] Macro (model A09M) design; black finish; succeeded by Sony SAL-2875

Notes

Notes and nomenclature
Apo	Apochromatic lens element(s)
(D) or D	"Distance encoder", lens provides subject distance information for utilization in the Advanced Distance Integration (ADI) flash mode and other features. While the "(D)" designation is used on the box and in the documentation, the lenses just feature a "D" instead. Requires 8 lens contacts; lenses with only 5 contacts cannot support this feature.
DT	"Digital Technology", lenses for cameras with APS-C (or Super-35mm) size sensors, only. DT lenses will not fully illuminate the sensor/film area of 24×36mm full-frame cameras. Three DT lenses were made and sold by Konica Minolta: 11–18, 18–70, and 18–200mm.
G	"Gold" series, Minolta's line-up of high-grade lenses. The "G" status does not occur as label on the lenses, but is indicated by a decorating ring on the lens.
High Speed	High Speed upgraded gearing for faster autofocus. As indicated, three lenses were upgradeable in authorized service centers as well.
II	Version II. Some lenses underwent more than just cosmetic changes, and are referred to as second version, in particular, when the optics have changed completely.
New	Restyled (not a designation found on the lens), aesthetic changes (such lenses were labelled "New" or "Neu" or "(N)" on the box and in the documentation by Minolta, but not specifically labelled on the lens itself).
SSM	"SuperSonic Motor", silent in-lens ultrasonic motor used on some lenses. Requires 8 lens contacts; lenses with only 5 contacts cannot support this feature. Can be used with manual focusing on cameras without SSM support (that is, Minolta film bodies released before 2000 - Minolta Dynax/Maxxum/α-9/9Ti can be upgraded by service).
Power or xi	Motorized zoom. Requires 8 lens contacts; lenses with only 5 contacts cannot support this feature.

== See also ==
- List of Minolta A-mount lenses
- List of Minolta A-mount cameras
- List of Konica Minolta A-mount cameras
- List of Sony A-mount cameras
- List of Minolta V-mount lenses
- List of Minolta SR-mount lenses
- List of Sony A-mount lenses
