= Sony FE 28-60mm F4-5.6 =

- Maker: Sony
- Lens mount(s): Sony E-mount

Technical data
- Type: Zoom
- Focal length: 28-60mm
- Image format: 35mm full-frame
- Aperture (max/min): f/4.0 (22.0) - 5.6 (32.0)
- Close focus distance: 0.30m (0.98ft)
- Max. magnification: 0.16x
- Diaphragm blades: 7
- Construction: 8 elements in 7 groups

Features
- Manual focus override: Yes Yes
- Weather-sealing: Yes Yes
- Lens-based stabilization: No No
- Aperture ring: No No

Physical
- Min. length: 45mm
- Diameter: 67mm
- Weight: 167g
- Filter diameter: 40.5mm
- Color: black

Accessories
- Lens hood: none

Retail info
- MSRP: 499 USD

The Sony FE 28-60mm F4-5.6 is a full-frame variable maximum aperture standard zoom lens for the Sony E-mount, announced by Sony on September 14, 2020. It was introduced on the same day as the Sony α7C, for which it is available bundled as a kit lens. At 167g it is the smallest and lightest full-frame zoom lens available for the E-mount.

Though designed for Sony's full-frame E-mount cameras, the lens can be used on Sony's APS-C E-mount camera bodies, with an equivalent full-frame field-of-view of 42-90mm (1.5x crop factor).

== Construction ==
The lens has a plastic exterior with a plastic zoom ring and smaller electronic focus ring. It also has a mechanical retracting mechanism which must be extended before shooting. The length of the lens varies through the zoom range, but stays constant when focusing. The mount is sealed with a gasket for dust and weather resistance. The lens does not feature optical image stabilization, instead relying on the camera's in-body SteadyShot stabilization when available.

== Optical properties ==
Centre sharpness is high throughout the zoom range, with soft extreme corners that improve as the lens is stopped down to f/8. Vignetting performance is average, occurring most noticeably at the widest focal lengths and apertures. The lens exhibits moderate lateral and longitudinal chromatic aberration; the former is easily corrected either in-camera or in post-processing, with the latter persisting throughout the aperture range. Coma is noticeable but controlled. Strong barrel distortion is seen at 28mm which transitions to slight pincushion distortion at 60mm; however, this is also handled well by the in-camera corrections. The lens is near parfocal.

== Autofocus ==
The lens has an internal linear autofocus motor. It supports both manual focus and direct manual focus modes (DMF) electronically. Focusing is quick, accurate and almost silent, with good low-light performance.

== See also ==
- List of Sony E-mount lenses
