= Pentax K-r =

Digital camera model

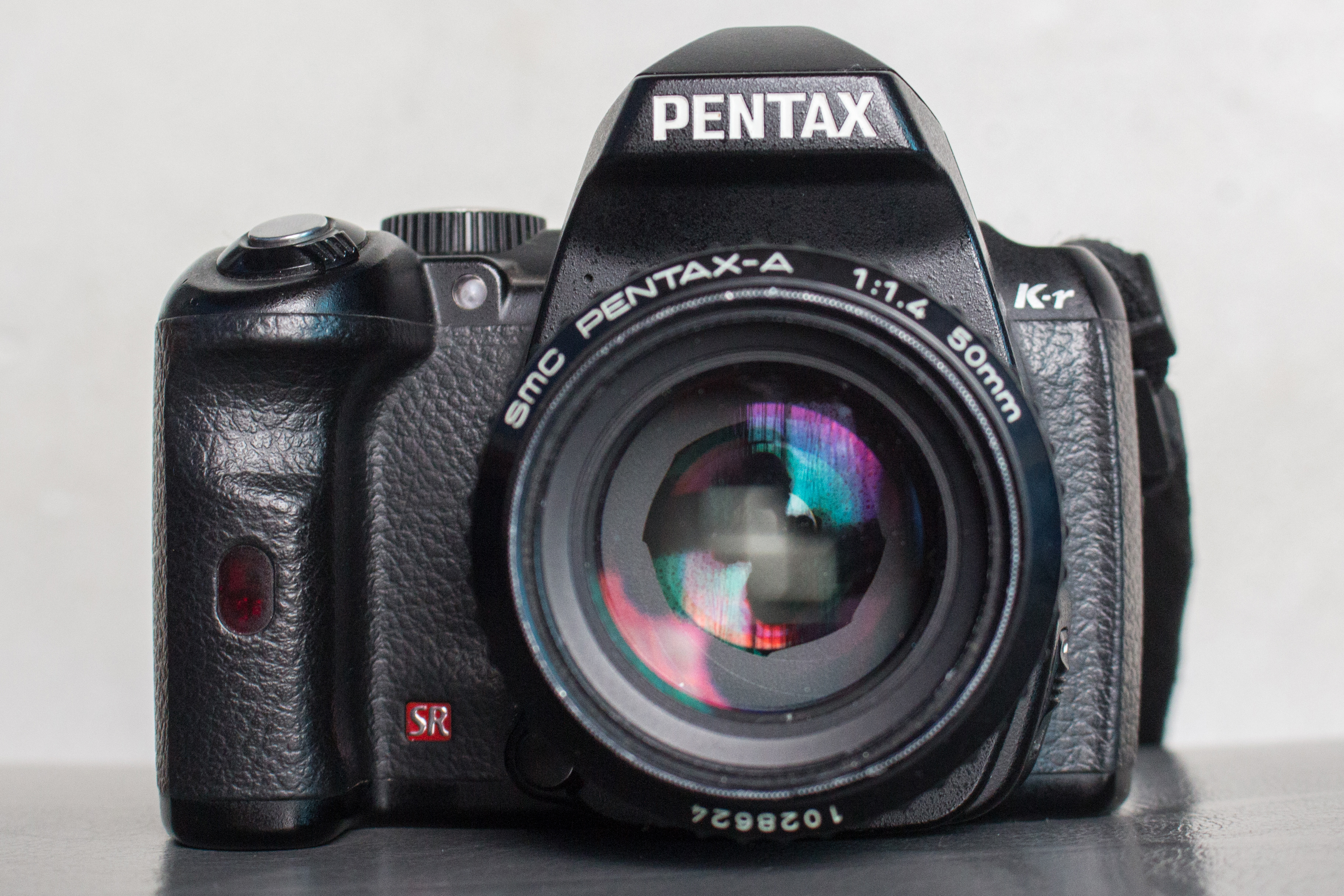

Overview
- Maker: Pentax
- Type: Digital single-lens reflex camera

Lens
- Lens: Interchangeable Pentax K_{AF2} mount compatible with Pentax auto-aperture lenses and SDM lenses; older lenses supported in stop-down metering mode.

Sensor/medium
- Sensor: 23.6 x 15.8 mm APS-C CMOS image sensor with a primary color filter
- Maximum resolution: 12.4 megapixels
- Film speed: Auto: 200–12800 (1, 1/2, 1/3 EV steps), up to 1600 in Bulb, expand to 100–25600 Manual: 200–12800 (1, 1/2, 1/3 EV steps), up to 1600 in Bulb, expand to 100–25600
- Recording medium: SD, SDHC, SDXC (via firmware update)

Focusing
- Focus areas: 11 AF points, 9 of them cross-type

Exposure/metering
- Exposure bracketing: +/- up to 3 stops in 1/2 or 1/3-stop increments for three frames
- Exposure modes: Full Auto, Portrait, Landscape, Macro, Moving Object, Night Scene Portrait, Flash Off, SCN (allows selecting Night Scene, Surf & Snow, Food, Sunset, Stage Lighting, Night Snap, Night Scene HDR, Kids, Pet, Candlelight, Museum), M (Manual), Av (Aperture Priority), Tv (Shutter Priority), Sv (Sensitivity Priority), P (Program), Movie; when shooting in Live View, Full Auto may select an additional Blue Sky mode
- Exposure metering: TTL open-aperture metering with choice of: 16-segment, Center-weighted & Spot meter. Sensitivity range: EV 1–21.5 (ISO 200, 50 mm f/1.4)
- Metering modes: Multi-segment, Center-weighted, Spot

Shutter
- Shutter speed range: 1/6000 sec – 30 sec, Bulb
- Continuous shooting: 6 frames per second for 13 RAW or 30 JPEG frames

Viewfinder
- Viewfinder: Eye-level pentamirror SLR, 96% coverage, 0.56x magnification

Image processing
- White balance: Auto, daylight, Shade, Cloudy, Fluorescent light, Tungsten light, Flash, Color Temperature Enhancement, Manual

General
- LCD screen: 3.0" TFT color LCD monitor with adjustable brightness. Resolution: 921,000 dots
- Battery: Rechargeable Li-Ion battery D-LI109, AA Battery Holder D-BH109 (optional) for 4× AA batteries
- Dimensions: 125×97×68 mm (4.9×3.8×2.7 in)
- Weight: 595 g (21.0 oz) with battery
- Made in: Philippines

The Pentax K-r is a 12.4-megapixel digital single-lens reflex camera, announced on September 9, 2010, and replaced the K-x in Pentax' line-up, with which it shares many features. The K-r is available in three body colors (black, white and red) in North America, with other colors available only in the Japanese market. The K-r introduces a new SAFOX IX autofocus system and has a 3-inch display. The image quality of Pentax K-r and K-x is identical, but colour fidelity in JPEG output has been increased. The K-r has been improved over the K-x in other areas, such as the K-r showing the active focus point in the viewfinder when the shutter button is half-pressed, the K-r offering the joint second-widest ISO range in the Pentax line-up along with K-30—100-25600 in extended mode, which only the K-5 exceeds (K-x: 12800 in extended mode), having the joint second-fastest continuous shooting (6.0 fps) of current Pentax DSLRs (same as the K-30), and using rechargeable battery Li-Ion D-LI109 as standard, but having the ability to use 4 × AA batteries with optional battery holder (the K-x uses AA batteries exclusively). The K-r also has a slightly larger, and much higher resolving display at 921,000 pixels vs. the K-x's 230,000.

== HDR (high dynamic range) capture ==
As in the K-x, the user can choose to have the camera take three images at different exposures and have them combined into a high dynamic range JPEG image. In contrast to its predecessor, the Pentax K-r offers the option to auto-align the images.

Type	Sensor	Class	2003	2004	2005	2006		2007	2008	2009	2010	2011	2012	2013	2014	2015	2016	2017	2018	2019	2020	2021	2022	2023	2024	2025
DSLR	MF	Professional										645D				645Z										
DSLR	FF	Professional																K-1		K-1 II						
DSLR	APS-C	High-end															K-3 II						K-3 III			
DSLR	APS-C	High-end													K-3											
DSLR	APS-C	Advanced									K-7	K-5		K-5 II / K-5 IIs												
DSLR	APS-C	Advanced		*ist D			K10D		K20D									KP								
DSLR	APS-C	Midrange					K100D	100DS	K200D					K-30	K-50			K-70						KF		
DSLR	APS-C	Entry-level			*ist DS	*ist DS2						K-r			K-500	K-S2										
DSLR	APS-C	Entry-level			*ist DL	DL2	K110D			K-m/K2000	K-x					K-S1										
MILC	APS-C	K-mount											K-01													
MILC	1/1.7"	Q-mount													Q7											
MILC	1/1.7"	Q-mount														Q-S1										
MILC	1/2.3"	Q-mount											Q	Q10												
DSLR	Prototypes		MZ-D (2000); 645D Prototype (2006); AP 50th Anniv. (2007)																							
Type	Sensor	Class																								
Type	Sensor	Class	2003	2004	2005	2006		2007	2008	2009	2010	2011	2012	2013	2014	2015	2016	2017	2018	2019	2020	2021	2022	2023	2024	2025
