= Konica Minolta AF Zoom DT 11-18mm f/4.5-5.6 (D) =

Camera lens

Konica Minolta AF Zoom DT 11-18mm f/4.5-5.6 (D) (2698-110)
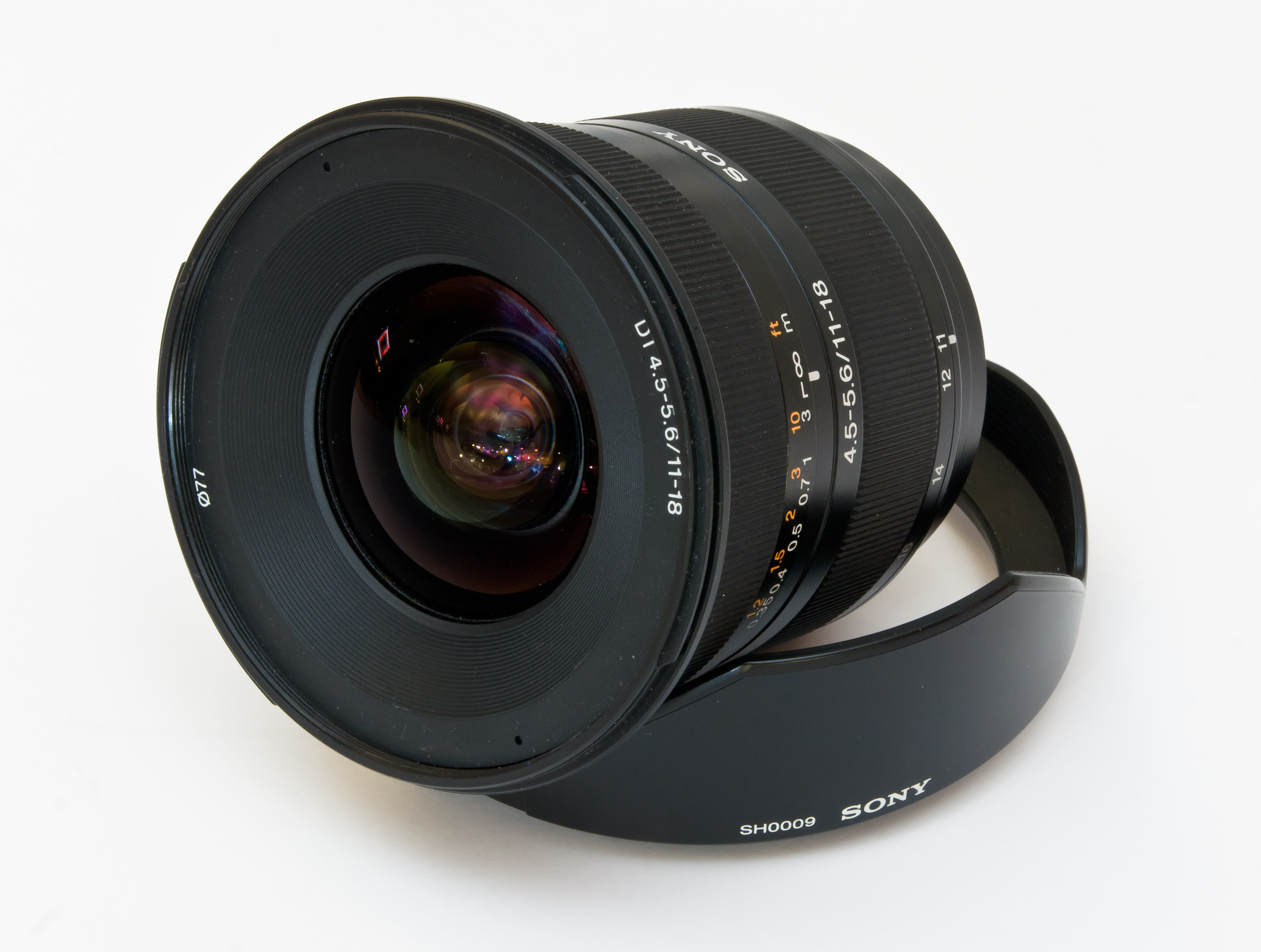
- Sony Alpha DT 11-18mm f/4.5-5.6 lens
- Maker: Konica Minolta, Sony

Technical data
- Type: Zoom
- Focal length: 11-18mm
- Aperture (max/min): f/4.5-5.6
- Close focus distance: 250 mm
- Max. magnification: 1/8
- Diaphragm blades: 7, circular
- Construction: 15 elements in 12 groups

Features
- Short back focus: No
- Ultrasonic motor: No
- Lens-based stabilization: No
- Macro capable: No
- Application: Wide-angle zoom lens

Physical
- Max. length: 845 mm
- Diameter: 77 mm
- Weight: 360 g
- Filter diameter: 77 mm

Accessories
- Lens hood: bayonet, flower

History
- Introduction: 2005 Konica Minolta, 2006 Sony
- Discontinuation: 2006 Konica Minolta
- Successor: Sony α DT 11-18mm f/4.5-5.6 lens (SAL-1118)

Retail info
- MSRP: 650 USD (as of 2006)

Originally produced as Konica Minolta AF Zoom DT 11-18mm f/4.5-5.6 (D) (2698–110) by Konica Minolta in 2005, and currently produced by Sony, the Sony α DT 11-18mm f/4.5-5.6 is compatible with cameras using the Minolta A-mount and Sony A-mount lens mounts. The DT designation means this lens is designed to be used with a camera with an APS-C size sensor. When the 1.5× crop factor is considered, the lens has an effective equivalent 16.5–27mm focal length.

== See also ==
- List of Konica Minolta A-mount lenses
- List of Minolta A-mount lenses

== Sources ==
- Dyxum lens data
