= Pentax K-01 =

2012 APS-C mirrorless camera

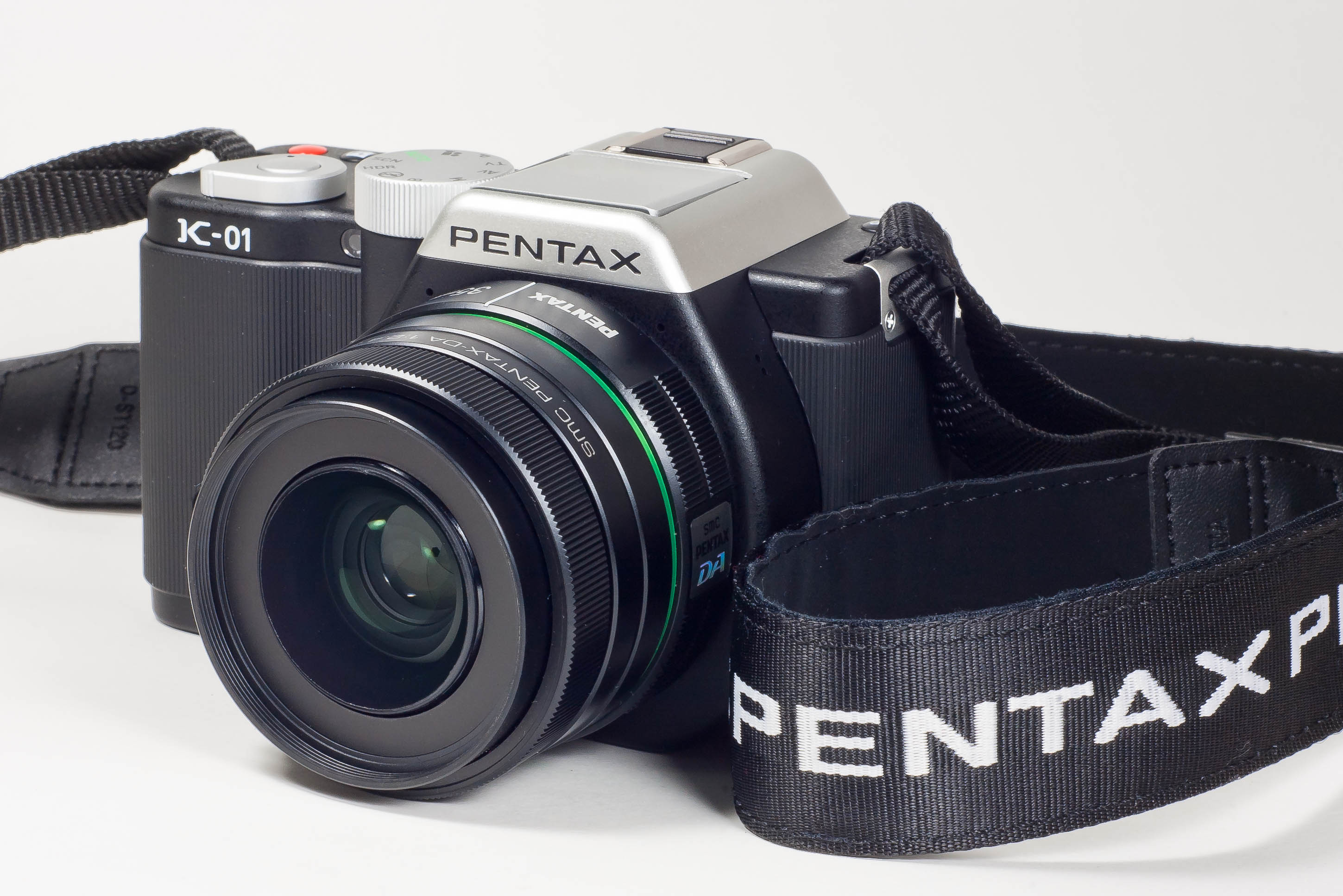

Overview
- Maker: Pentax
- Type: Mirrorless interchangeable-lens camera

Lens
- Lens: Pentax KAF_{2} mount

Sensor/medium
- Sensor: APS-C CMOS sensor
- Sensor size: 23.7 x 15.7 mm
- Maximum resolution: 16.28 megapixel
- Recording medium: SD, HC, SDXC

Exposure/metering
- Exposure metering: EV -1 to 21 (ISO 100, 50mm 1.4)

Shutter
- Shutter speed range: 1/4000-30 seconds

Image processing
- Image processor: PRIME M

General
- LCD screen: 3"
- Weight: Without battery or removable memory: 480g (16.9 oz); 560g (19.8 oz) with dedicated battery & SD memory card

Pentax K-01 is a mirrorless interchangeable-lens camera announced in February 2012. It uses the Pentax K mount.

The camera was listed as discontinued in February 2013, but the following July was reintroduced to the Japanese market in a new white and blue colour variant.

== Lens compatibility ==
The Pentax K-01 is the first interchangeable single-lens mirrorless camera which is compatible with lenses from a typical SLR camera without the use of an adapter. This differs from cameras from other manufacturers such as Nikon's Nikon 1 or Pentax's own Pentax Q, where the manufacturers designed a new lens mount specifically for the new camera system.

The camera is compatible with all K mount lenses; K mount lenses started being made in 1975. Lenses without the "A" aperture setting will only meter properly using stop-down metering. Manual focus lenses will continue to function as manual-focus only.

== Image quality ==
The K-01 features the same sensor as the Pentax K-5 and Nikon D7000 DSLRs, a Sony 16 MP sensor. DxOMark has rated the potential image quality of the K-01 as slightly lower than the K-5 and D7000. However, compared to other MILCs, the Pentax K-01 is rated slightly better than the Sony NEX-5N, and slightly below the Sony NEX-7. DxOMark's Sport (low light ISO) rating placed the K-01 first among all MILCs at the time it was tested.

== Design ==
The camera body was designed by Marc Newson.

== Awards ==
The K-01 was selected as a Product Design winner at the 2012 red dot design awards, and for a Gold award at the German Design Award 2013.

== Variants ==
The Pentax K-01 was released in four body colour combinations: black body with silver top and black grips, black body with silver top and yellow grips, silver body with black top (Europe only) and white body with black top and black grips. A blue and white version was released in July 2013.

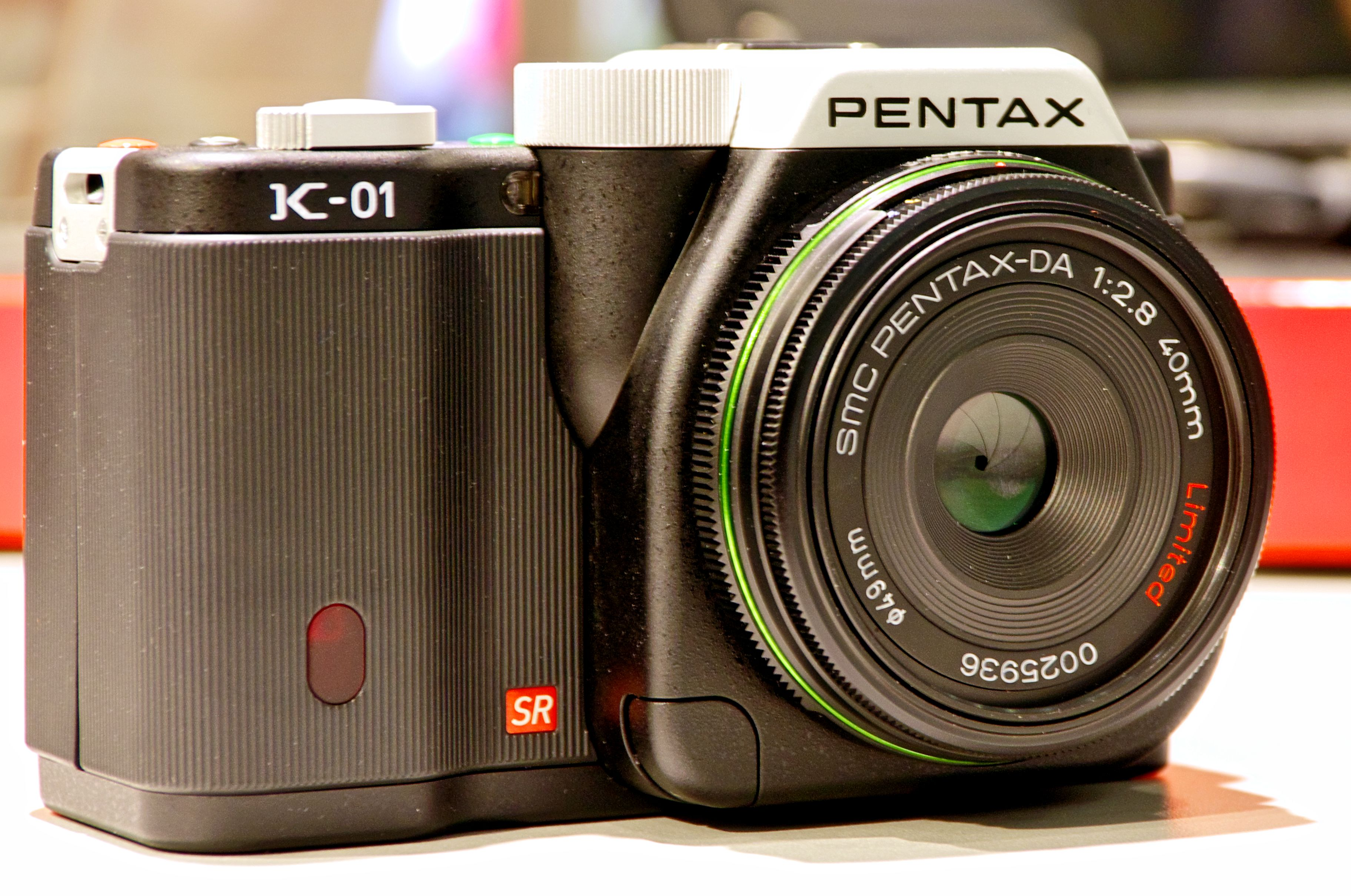
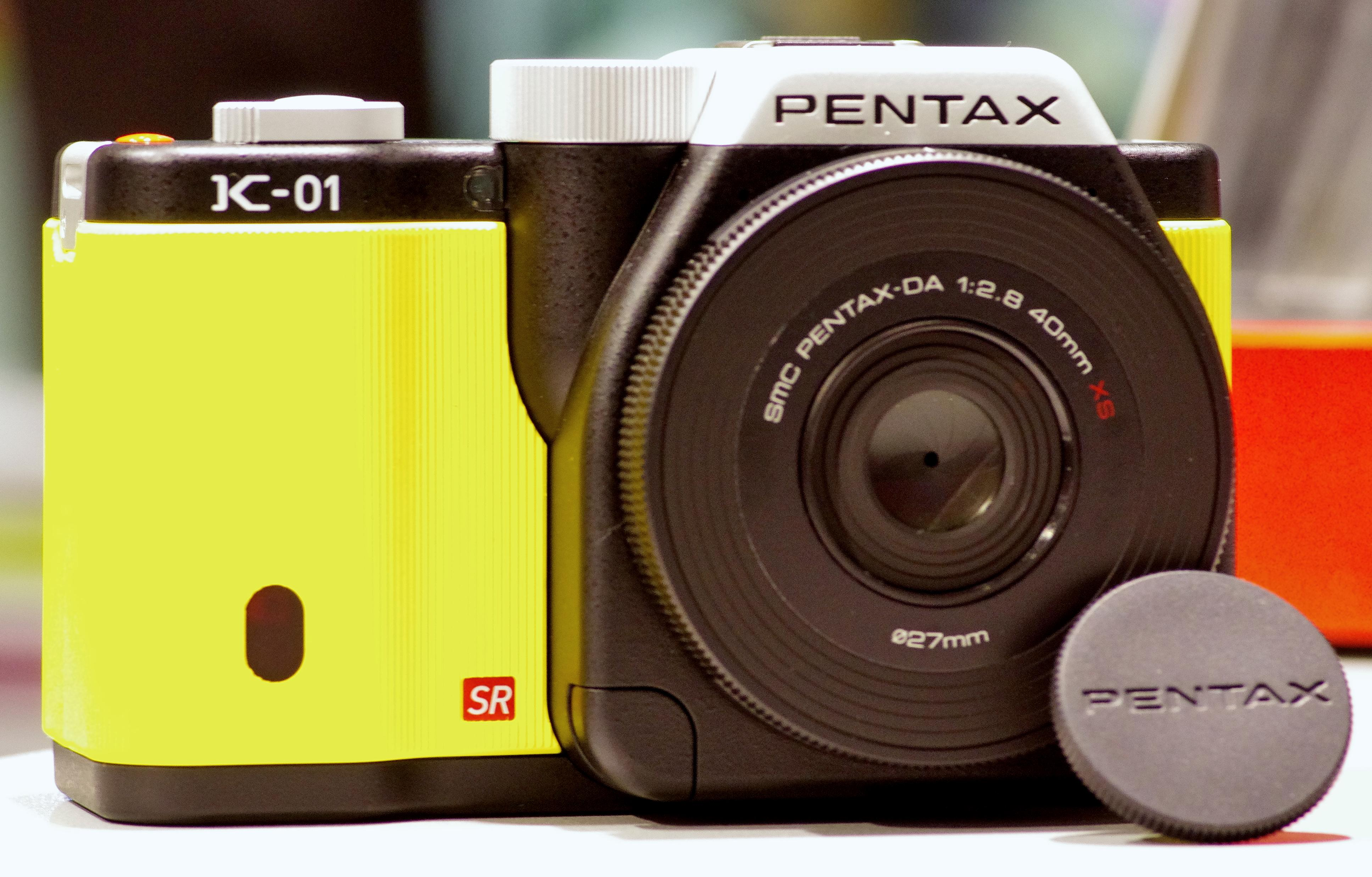
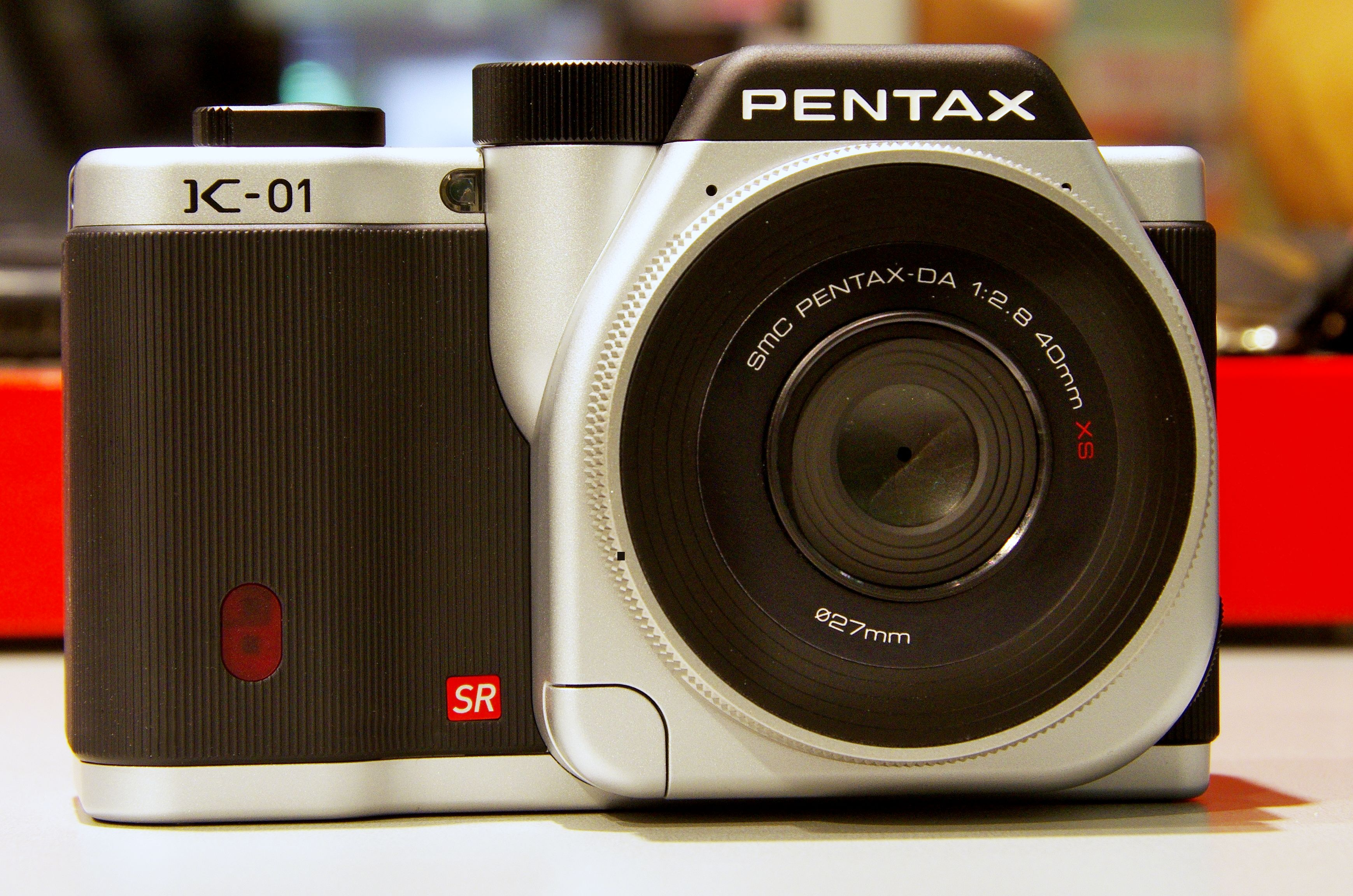

== Reception ==
Almost immediately upon its release, the K-01 became one of the most controversial Pentax offerings, with criticism focusing on the Marc Newson design, which many considered made the camera too heavy and uncomfortable to hold, with poorly-placed controls, while acknowledging its strong image quality and low-light / high ISO performance. Other reviewers complained about slow autofocusing. Positive aspects of the K-01 included its image and build quality and its compatibility with all existing Pentax K-mount lenses.

Type	Sensor	Class	2003	2004	2005	2006		2007	2008	2009	2010	2011	2012	2013	2014	2015	2016	2017	2018	2019	2020	2021	2022	2023	2024	2025
DSLR	MF	Professional										645D				645Z										
DSLR	FF	Professional																K-1		K-1 II						
DSLR	APS-C	High-end															K-3 II						K-3 III			
DSLR	APS-C	High-end													K-3											
DSLR	APS-C	Advanced									K-7	K-5		K-5 II / K-5 IIs												
DSLR	APS-C	Advanced		*ist D			K10D		K20D									KP								
DSLR	APS-C	Midrange					K100D	100DS	K200D					K-30	K-50			K-70						KF		
DSLR	APS-C	Entry-level			*ist DS	*ist DS2						K-r			K-500	K-S2										
DSLR	APS-C	Entry-level			*ist DL	DL2	K110D			K-m/K2000	K-x					K-S1										
MILC	APS-C	K-mount											K-01													
MILC	1/1.7"	Q-mount													Q7											
MILC	1/1.7"	Q-mount														Q-S1										
MILC	1/2.3"	Q-mount											Q	Q10												
DSLR	Prototypes		MZ-D (2000); 645D Prototype (2006); AP 50th Anniv. (2007)																							
Type	Sensor	Class																								
Type	Sensor	Class	2003	2004	2005	2006		2007	2008	2009	2010	2011	2012	2013	2014	2015	2016	2017	2018	2019	2020	2021	2022	2023	2024	2025
