= Pentax K-7 =

2009 APS-C digital single-lens reflex camera

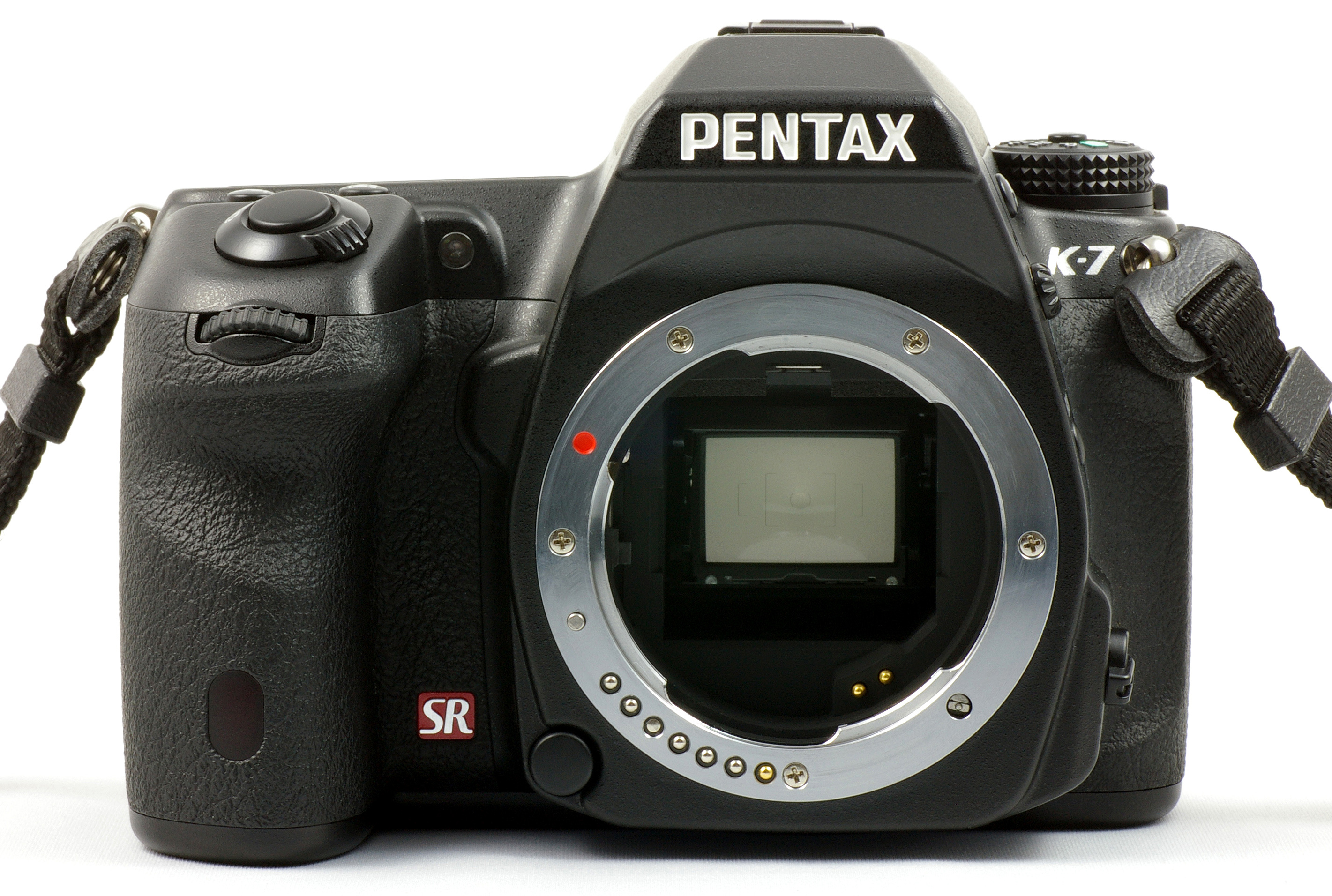

Overview
- Maker: Pentax
- Type: digital single-lens reflex camera

Lens
- Lens: Interchangeable Pentax K_{AF3} and K_{AF2} mount compatible with Pentax auto-aperture lenses; older lenses supported in stop-down metering mode.

Sensor/medium
- Sensor: APS-C (1.54×) CMOS active pixel sensor with a primary color filter
- Maximum resolution: 14.6 megapixels
- Film speed: ISO Auto, 100, 200, 400, 800, 1600, 3200, boosted: 6400
- Recording medium: SD, SDHC; SDXC with firmware update 1.12 or later

Exposure/metering
- Exposure modes: Hyper Program, Hyper Manual, Sensitivity Priority, Shutter-Speed Priority, Aperture Priority, Shutter-Speed and Aperture Priority, Manual, Bulb, Green (Auto)
- Exposure metering: TTL open-aperture metering with choice of: 77-segment, Center-weighted & Spot meter

Flash
- Flash: Onboard pop-up flash with high-speed sync, P-TTL external flashes via hotshoe, PC socket external flash, 1/180 s X-sync speed

Shutter
- Shutter speed range: 1/8000 s – 30 s, Bulb
- Continuous shooting: 5.2 frames/s up to 40 JPEG images or 15 RAW images

Viewfinder
- Viewfinder: Eye-level pentaprism, near-100% coverage, 0.92× magnification

General
- LCD screen: 3″, 640×480 (VGA)
- Battery: Rechargeable D-LI90 lithium-ion battery, optional AC adapter
- Weight: 670 g (body only), 750 g (with battery)

The Pentax K-7 is a 14.6-megapixel digital single-lens reflex camera, announced on 20 May 2009. This is the first new flagship model released by Pentax since its merger with Hoya Corporation on 31 March 2008. It was discontinued late in 2010 in favour of the K-5.

== Features ==
The Pentax K-7 was announced on 20 May 2009 and shipping began as of the first week of July 2009. The K-7 has the same pixel count as its predecessor, the K20D, but offers a significantly expanded feature set in a smaller body. New features include:

- body is still weather resistant like the K20D; however, it is now made of magnesium alloy, and it is now also low temperature resistant
- a high-definition video recording function (30 frames per second at 1536×1024 resolution or HDTV (cropped))
- TAv exposure mode: Time/Aperture Value: photographer sets his own desired shutter speed/aperture, while the camera adjusts the ISO accordingly to compensate exposure
- in-camera high dynamic range imaging function to create one composite image from three images with different exposures
- dedicated AF-assist lamp
- in-camera electronic level that works with Earth's gravity, usable in total darkness too (a 1st by Pentax in any camera model from any brand)
- automatic horizon correction
- a new shutter rated for 100,000 actuations and capable of shutter speeds as fast as 1/8000 second
- continuous shooting speed of up to 5.2 frames per second
- a viewfinder with 100% field coverage
- a new Natural-Bright-Matte III focusing screen
- a new autofocus module
- a 77-segment light meter
- a newly developed DR II dust removal system
- a 3″ LCD monitor with a wide angle IPS panel with approximately 921k dots
- Face recognition in live view mode
- a new-generation Shake Reduction mechanism which can compensate for rotational movement
- lighter weight: the K-7 body weighs 55 g (7.5%) less than the K20D
- very quiet shutter

== Gallery ==
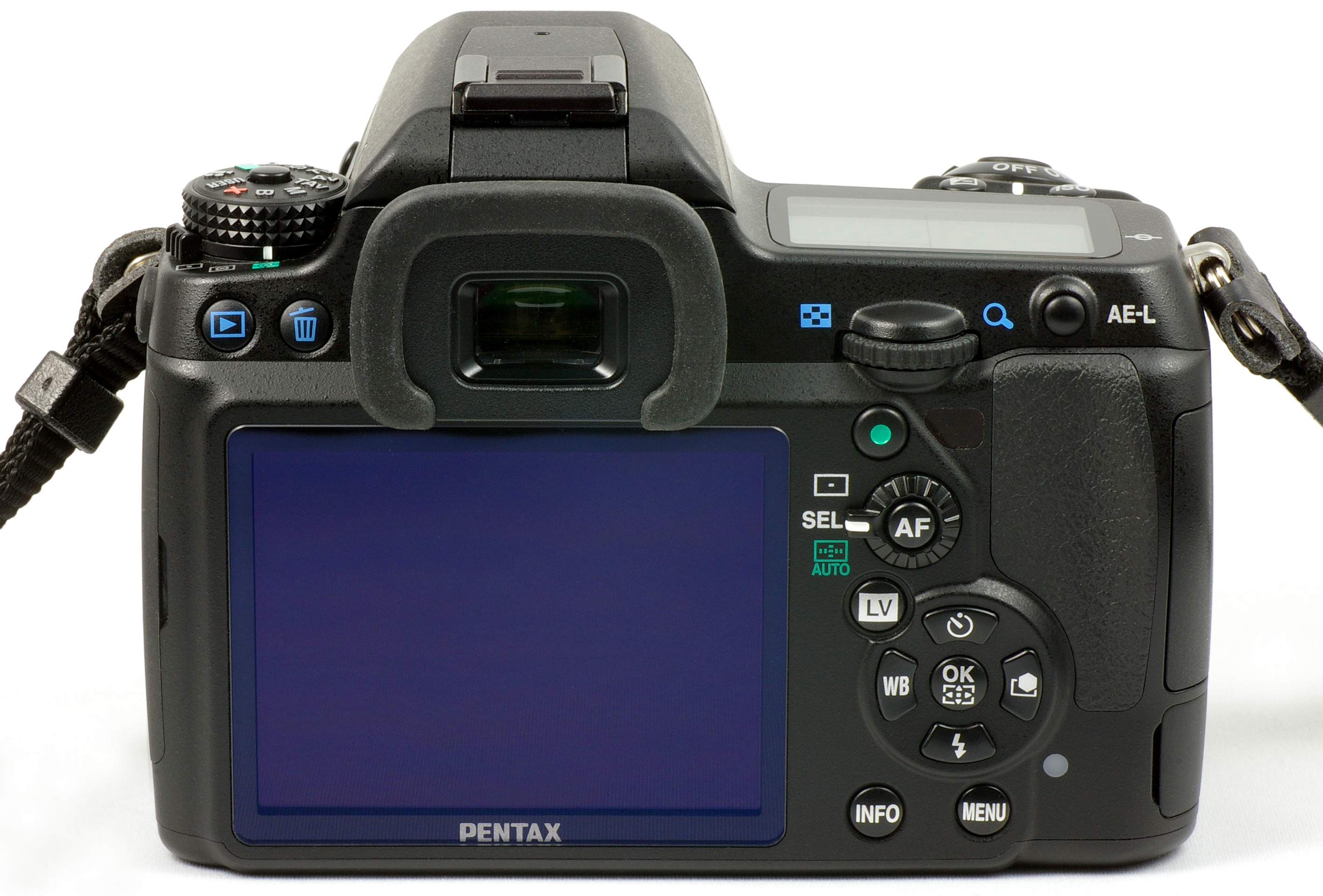
back side with display

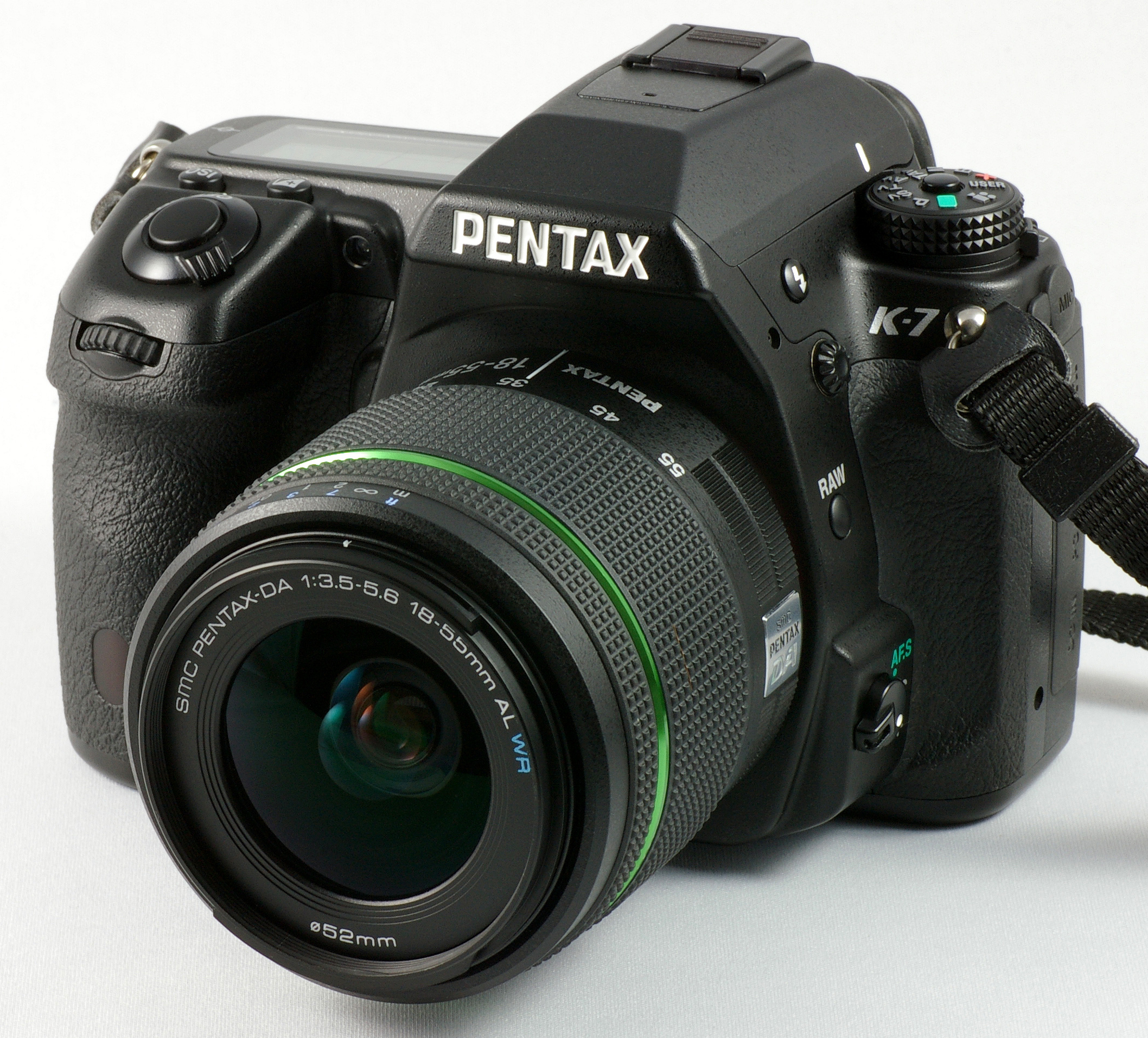
body with zoom lens

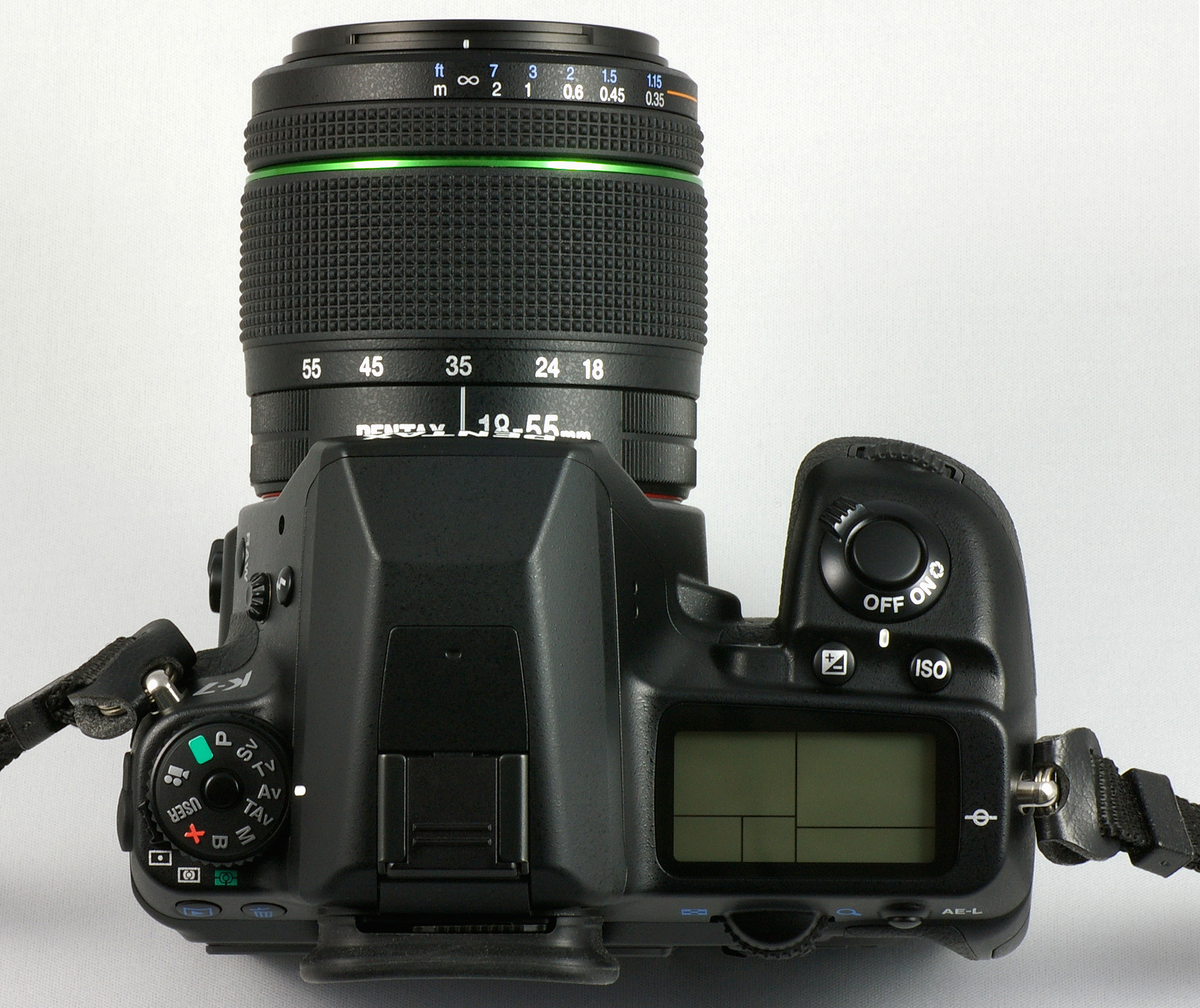
view from above

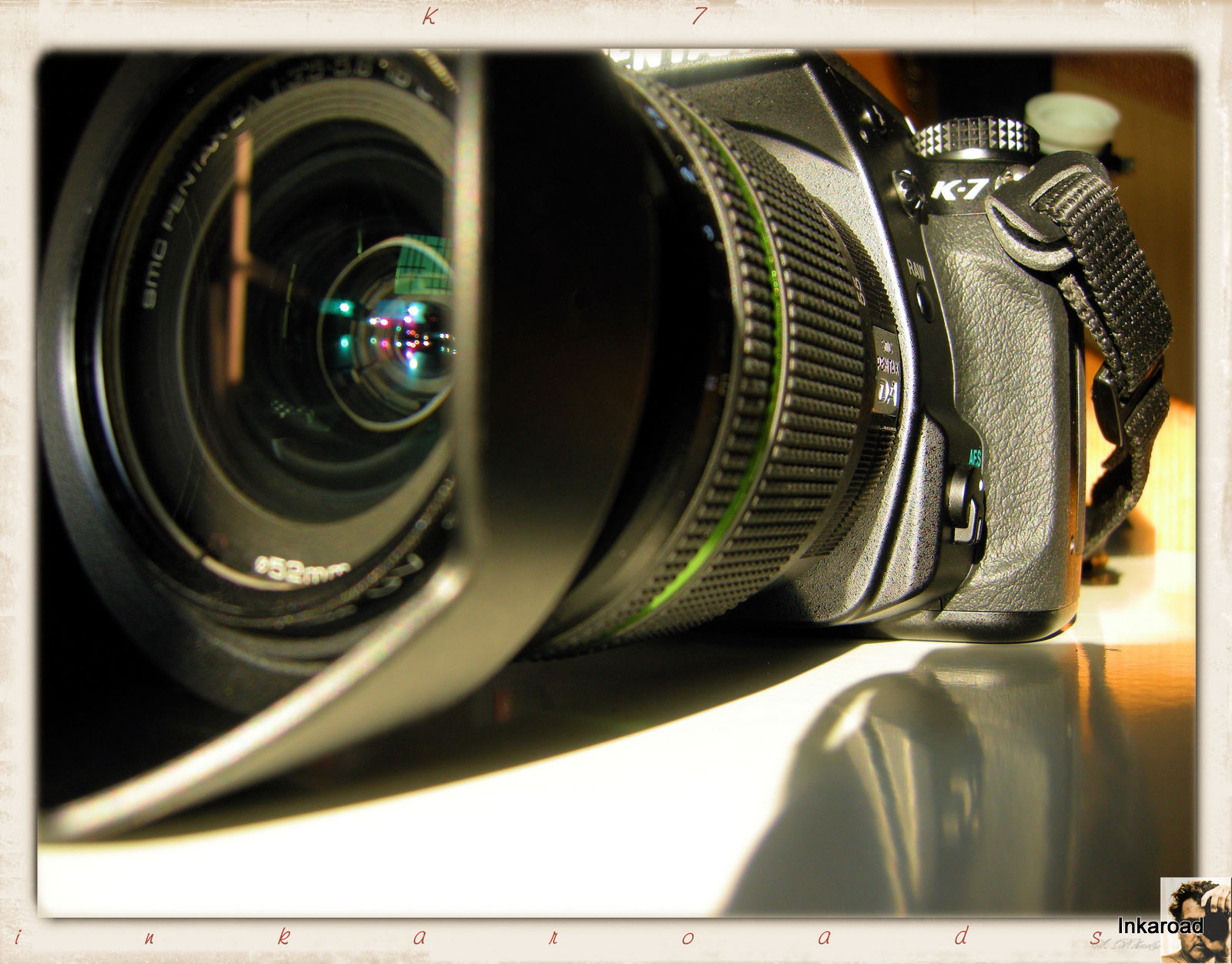
Pentax K7

Type	Sensor	Class	2003	2004	2005	2006		2007	2008	2009	2010	2011	2012	2013	2014	2015	2016	2017	2018	2019	2020	2021	2022	2023	2024	2025
DSLR	MF	Professional										645D				645Z										
DSLR	FF	Professional																K-1		K-1 II						
DSLR	APS-C	High-end															K-3 II						K-3 III			
DSLR	APS-C	High-end													K-3											
DSLR	APS-C	Advanced									K-7	K-5		K-5 II / K-5 IIs												
DSLR	APS-C	Advanced		*ist D			K10D		K20D									KP								
DSLR	APS-C	Midrange					K100D	100DS	K200D					K-30	K-50			K-70						KF		
DSLR	APS-C	Entry-level			*ist DS	*ist DS2						K-r			K-500	K-S2										
DSLR	APS-C	Entry-level			*ist DL	DL2	K110D			K-m/K2000	K-x					K-S1										
MILC	APS-C	K-mount											K-01													
MILC	1/1.7"	Q-mount													Q7											
MILC	1/1.7"	Q-mount														Q-S1										
MILC	1/2.3"	Q-mount											Q	Q10												
DSLR	Prototypes		MZ-D (2000); 645D Prototype (2006); AP 50th Anniv. (2007)																							
Type	Sensor	Class																								
Type	Sensor	Class	2003	2004	2005	2006		2007	2008	2009	2010	2011	2012	2013	2014	2015	2016	2017	2018	2019	2020	2021	2022	2023	2024	2025
