= Pentax DA 18-55mm lens =

SMC Pentax-DA 18-55mm f/3.5-5.6 AL II
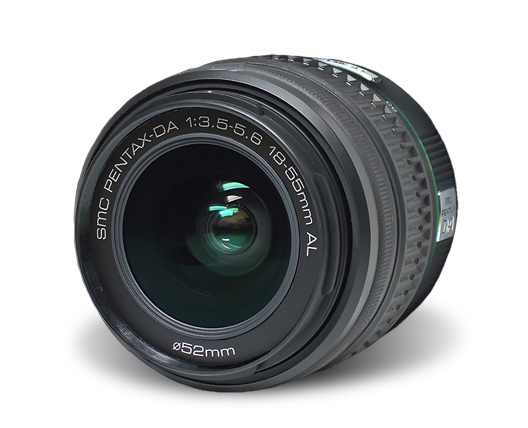
- Maker: Pentax

Technical data
- Type: Zoom
- Focal length: 18-55mm
- Focal length (35mm equiv.): 27-82.5mm
- Crop factor: 1.5
- Aperture (max/min): f/3.5-5.6 / f/22-38
- Close focus distance: 0.25 metres (9.8 in)
- Max. magnification: 0.34x
- Diaphragm blades: 6
- Construction: 11 elements in 8 groups

Features
- Application: Standard zoom

Physical
- Max. length: 67.5 millimetres (2.66 in)
- Diameter: 68.0 millimetres (2.68 in)
- Weight: 220 grams (7.8 oz)
- Filter diameter: 52mm

Accessories
- Lens hood: PH-RBA 52mm
- Case: S80-120

Angle of view
- Diagonal: 76°-28°

History
- Introduction: 2008

Retail info
- MSRP: 199.95 USD

The SMC Pentax-DA 18-55mm f/3.5-5.6 AL lens is a standard zoom lens for the Pentax K-mount. It is often sold as a kit lens with Pentax digital SLR cameras and has a 35mm equivalent focal length of 27–82.5mm. Its optical formula is made of 12 elements in 9 groups. There are two variants of this lens:

- SMC Pentax-DA 18-55mm 1:3.5-5.6 AL (first version of 18–55; LensType=252)
- Samsung D-XENON 18-55mm 1:3.5-5.6 AL (Schneider Kreuznach branded variant; supplied with Samsung GX-series DSLRs; LensType=246)

A new optical formula (11 elements in 8 groups) was introduced in 2008 and exists in five variants:

- SMC Pentax-DA 18-55mm 1:3.5-5.6 AL II (revised version with greater sharpness; LensType=229)
- Samsung D-XENON 18-55mm 1:3.5-5.6 AL II (Schneider Kreuznach branded variant of revised 18–55; LensType=223)
- SMC Pentax-DA L 18-55mm 1:3.5-5.6 AL (lightweight variant with plastic mount; LensType=222)
- SMC Pentax-DA 18-55mm 1:3.5-5.6 AL WR (weather-resistant variant; LensType=218)
- SMC Pentax-DA L 18-55mm 1:3.5-5.6 AL WR (weather-resistant but with lighter build with plastic mount; introduced with K-50; LensType=202)

All lenses except the DA L variants provide the Quick-Shift Focus System, providing full-time manual focus while in autofocus mode. The DA L variants also lack a distance scale and are sold without a hood. The hood for non-WR variants is PH-RBA52 while the hood for WR variants is PH-RBC52
