= Pentax K-5 =

Digital camera model

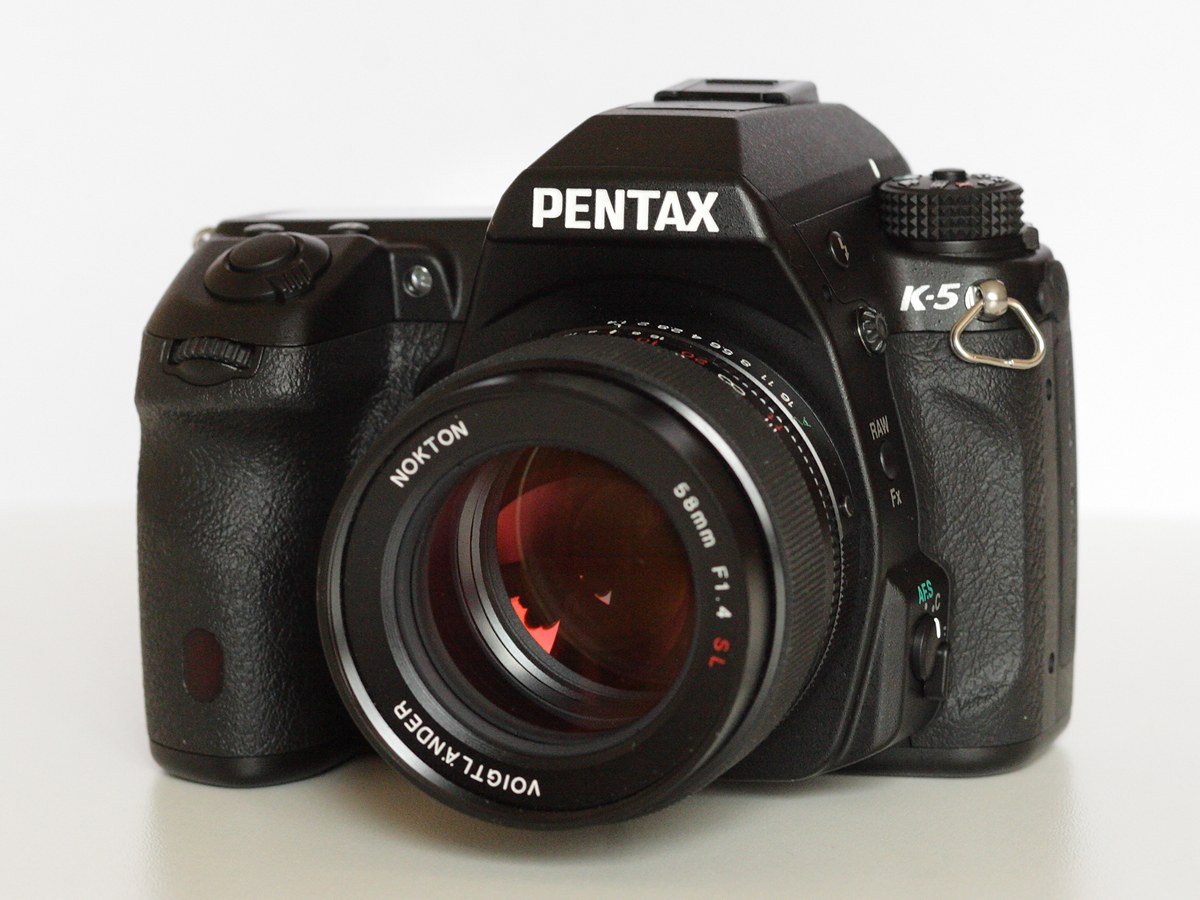

Overview
- Maker: Ricoh
- Type: Digital single-lens reflex camera

Lens
- Lens: Interchangeable Pentax K_{AF3} and K_{AF2} mount compatible with Pentax auto-aperture lenses; older lenses supported in stop-down metering mode

Sensor/medium
- Sensor: CMOS sensor
- Sensor type: IMX071
- Sensor size: 23.7 × 15.7 mm APS-C
- Sensor maker: Sony IMX071
- Maximum resolution: 16.3 megapixels (4928×3264)
- Film speed: ISO 100–12,800 in 1, 1/2, or 1/3 EV steps; expandable to ISO 80–51,200
- Storage media: SD and SDHC; SDXC with firmware update 1.02 or later

Exposure/metering
- Exposure modes: Green (fully automatic), program, aperture priority, shutter priority, sensitivity priority, aperture and shutter priority, manual, bulb, X-sync shutter speed, five User presets.
- Exposure metering: TTL open-aperture metering, 77 segments
- Metering modes: Multi-segment, Center-weighted, Spot

Flash
- Flash: Onboard pop-up flash; hot shoe for P-TTL flash units with high-speed sync support; PC socket for studio flashes; 1/180 s X-sync speed

Shutter
- Shutter speed range: 30 – 1/8000 s, Bulb
- Continuous shooting: Up to 7 fps

Viewfinder
- Viewfinder: Eye-level pentaprism, near-100% coverage, 0.92× magnification

Image processing
- Image processor: Prime II

General
- LCD screen: 3″, 921,000 dots (640×480 RGB pixels)
- Battery: D-LI90 lithium-ion rechargeable battery
- Optional battery packs: D-BG4 battery grip accepts additional D-LI90 battery or 6 AA (R6) batteries
- Dimensions: 131×97×73 mm (5.2×3.8×2.9 in)
- Weight: With battery: 750 g (1.65 lb); Without battery: 670 g (1.48 lb)
- Made in: Philippines

The Pentax K-5 is a 16.3-megapixel digital single-lens reflex camera, announced on September 20, 2010. It began shipping in mid-October 2010 and it was replaced by the Pentax K-5 II in the third quarter of 2012.

Externally, the camera body is almost unchanged from the Pentax K-7 (the mode dial on the left side is slightly higher). The main improvements compared to the previous model are higher light sensitivity (ISO range between 80 and 51,200, high ISO performance with improved noise control); an increase in sensor resolution by nearly two megapixels; and an all-new autofocus subsystem, SAFOX IX+.

The use of a Sony sensor in the K-5 signalled a major departure from the Samsung sensor partnership.

The latest firmware release is 1.16.

== Feature improvements ==
Consistent with previous Pentax models, there are many small improvements as well:

- Multiple customizable "USER" modes
- Customizable raw/Fx button replaces previous single-purpose raw button
- Selectable noise reduction levels for each ISO value
- More auto-bracketing options
- 1080p video (25 fps)
- 7 fps continuous shooting at full resolution
- Bleach Bypass and Film Reversal image tone settings
- Electronic level now shows pitch and roll
- More grid overlays in live view mode

== Notable features ==
- Rechargeable Li-Ion battery D-LI90 or 6 × AA (R6) batteries in battery grip D-BG4
- Magnesium alloy shell over stainless steel chassis, weather resistant with 77 weather protection seals. The K-5 is designed to operate at temperatures of −10 to 40 °C (14 to 104 °F).
- Two-axis (roll and pitch) level meter
- Automatic horizon correction up to 1° with SR on or 2° with SR off.
- HDR (high dynamic range) function with auto-align now usable in hand-held shooting
- SAFOX (Sensor Ability Fortifying Optical Compensation System-CS shortened to X) IX+ autofocus system that offers a choice of shutter-release options—between focus priority and release priority in the AF.S (single) advance mode, or between focus priority and speed priority in the AF.C (continuous) advance mode
- Lens correction for lens distortion and lateral chromatic aberration in Pentax FA, DA and DFA lenses
- The K_{AF2} mount is compatible with all Pentax K-mount lenses made since 1975.

== Video mode ==
The K-5 can record video at 1080p full HD as well as at lower resolutions using the motion JPEG codec. Videos can be recorded at the following resolutions and frame rates:

- 1920×1080 (25 fps)
- 1280×720 (25/30 fps)
- 640×424 (25/30 fps)

== DxOMark sensor tests ==
DxO Labs gave the 16.3 MP Sony-built sensor a score of 82. This ranked at the time of testing, the highest ever for an APS-C sensor and ahead of several full-frame sensors such as the one used in the Nikon D3. One of the major factors was shadow noise and dynamic range (in raw mode, to bypass in-camera processing). However, the closely related sensor in the Nikon D7000 scored 80.

== Accessories ==
- The weather-sealed D-BG4 battery grip that fit the Pentax K-7 can also be used on the Pentax K-5.
- Pentax InfraRed Remote Control F or Wired Remote
- Pentax AF-360FGZ and AF-540FGZ External Flash units
- Pentax AF-160FC Flash Ring
- Pentax GPS Module O-GPS1

Type	Sensor	Class	2003	2004	2005	2006		2007	2008	2009	2010	2011	2012	2013	2014	2015	2016	2017	2018	2019	2020	2021	2022	2023	2024	2025
DSLR	MF	Professional										645D				645Z										
DSLR	FF	Professional																K-1		K-1 II						
DSLR	APS-C	High-end															K-3 II						K-3 III			
DSLR	APS-C	High-end													K-3											
DSLR	APS-C	Advanced									K-7	K-5		K-5 II / K-5 IIs												
DSLR	APS-C	Advanced		*ist D			K10D		K20D									KP								
DSLR	APS-C	Midrange					K100D	100DS	K200D					K-30	K-50			K-70						KF		
DSLR	APS-C	Entry-level			*ist DS	*ist DS2						K-r			K-500	K-S2										
DSLR	APS-C	Entry-level			*ist DL	DL2	K110D			K-m/K2000	K-x					K-S1										
MILC	APS-C	K-mount											K-01													
MILC	1/1.7"	Q-mount													Q7											
MILC	1/1.7"	Q-mount														Q-S1										
MILC	1/2.3"	Q-mount											Q	Q10												
DSLR	Prototypes		MZ-D (2000); 645D Prototype (2006); AP 50th Anniv. (2007)																							
Type	Sensor	Class																								
Type	Sensor	Class	2003	2004	2005	2006		2007	2008	2009	2010	2011	2012	2013	2014	2015	2016	2017	2018	2019	2020	2021	2022	2023	2024	2025
