= Canon EOS M50 =

2018 APS-C mirrorless camera

Canon EOS M50 / EOS Kiss M
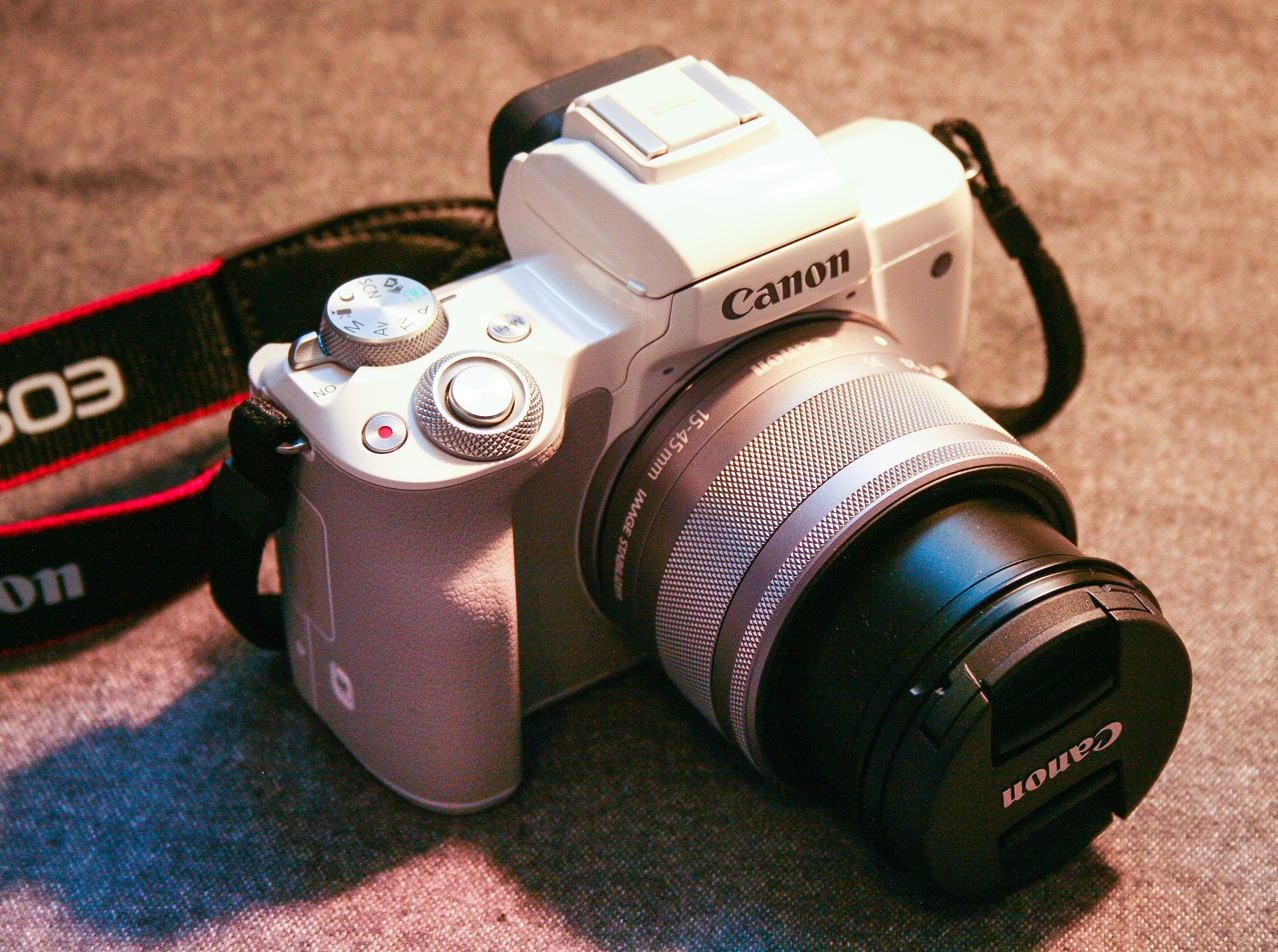

Overview
- Maker: Canon Inc.
- Type: Mirrorless interchangeable lens camera
- Intro price: $779.99

Lens
- Lens mount: Canon EF-M

Sensor/medium
- Sensor: dual-pixel CMOS sensor
- Sensor size: APS-C (22.3 × 14.9 mm)
- Maximum resolution: 24.1 MP
- Film speed: ISO 100 – 25,600 expandable to 51,200
- Recording medium: SDXC (UHS-I capable)

Focusing
- Focus: Dual Pixel CMOS autofocus

Shutter
- Frame rate: 10 fps; 7.4 fps with autofocus
- Shutter speeds: 30 s to 1/4000 s

Viewfinder
- Viewfinder: 2.36–million dot OLED EVF

Image processing
- Image processor: DIGIC 8

General
- Video recording: 4K resolution (23.98 fps)
- LCD screen: 3.2 in 1.62-million-dot LCD
- Battery: LP-E12
- Data port(s): Wi-Fi, NFC, Bluetooth
- Dimensions: 116.3 mm × 88.1 mm × 58.7 mm (4.58 in × 3.47 in × 2.31 in)
- Weight: 387 g (13.7 oz)
- Made in: Japan

Chronology
- Predecessor: Canon EOS M5
- Successor: Canon EOS M50 Mark II

The Canon EOS M50, called Canon EOS Kiss M in Japan, is a digital mirrorless interchangeable-lens camera announced by Canon on February 25, 2018 and sale began on March 23, 2018.

As with all of the Canon EOS M series cameras, the M50 uses the Canon EF-M lens mount. An adapter is available for use with Canon EF lenses. The camera, as well as some lenses, are available in either black or silver.

== Key features ==
- Videos with 4K resolution and 23.98 fps or 25 fps (PAL / NTSC), but no 30 fps mode. File size can be up to 4GB.
- 1080/60p and 720/120p HD video
- ISO 100 – 25,600, expandable up to 51,200.
- Dual Pixel CMOS autofocus (except 4K video - only contrast autofocus).
- 2.36-million dot OLED built-in electronic viewfinder (EVF).
- The DIGIC 8 processor was introduced with this camera.
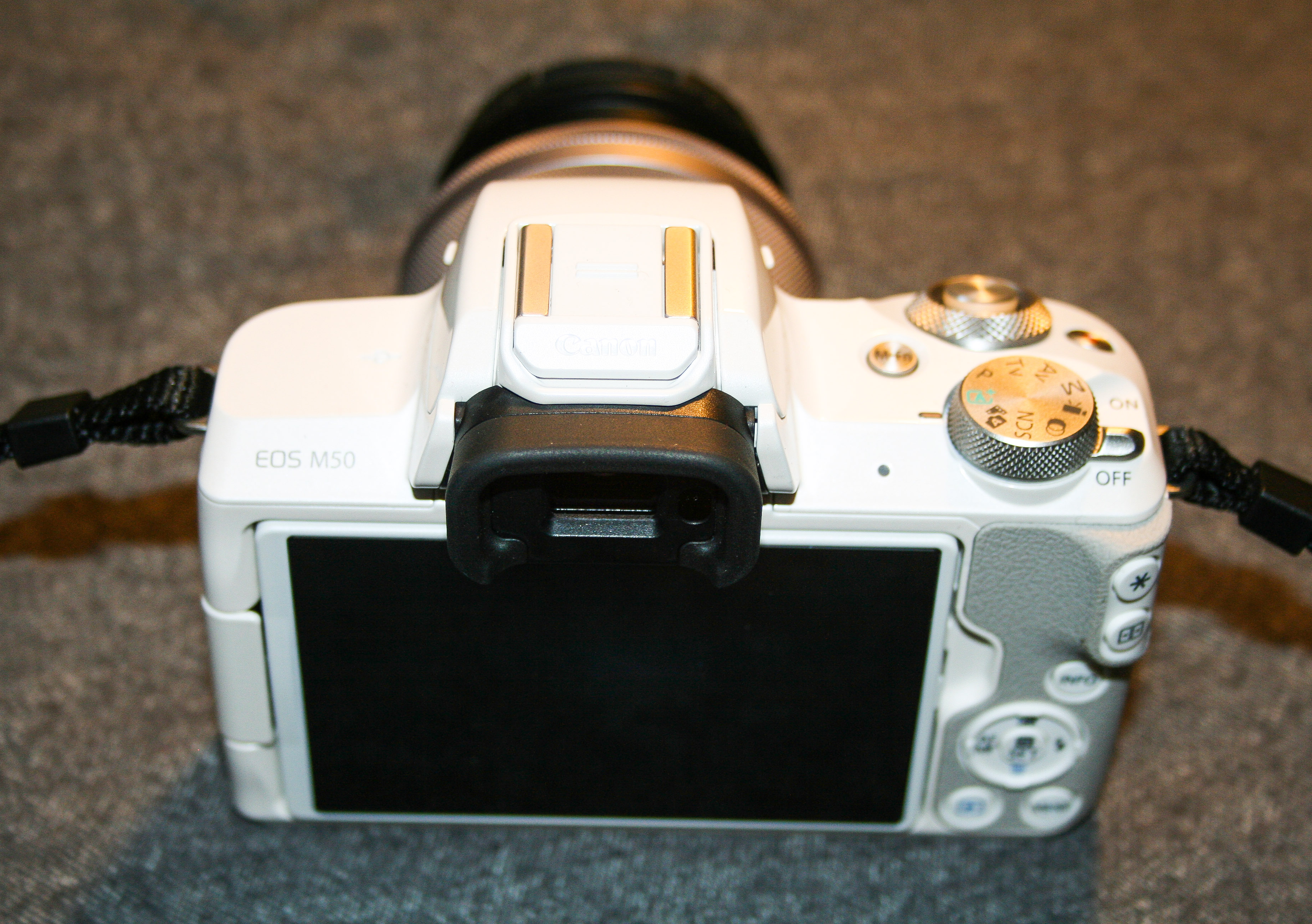

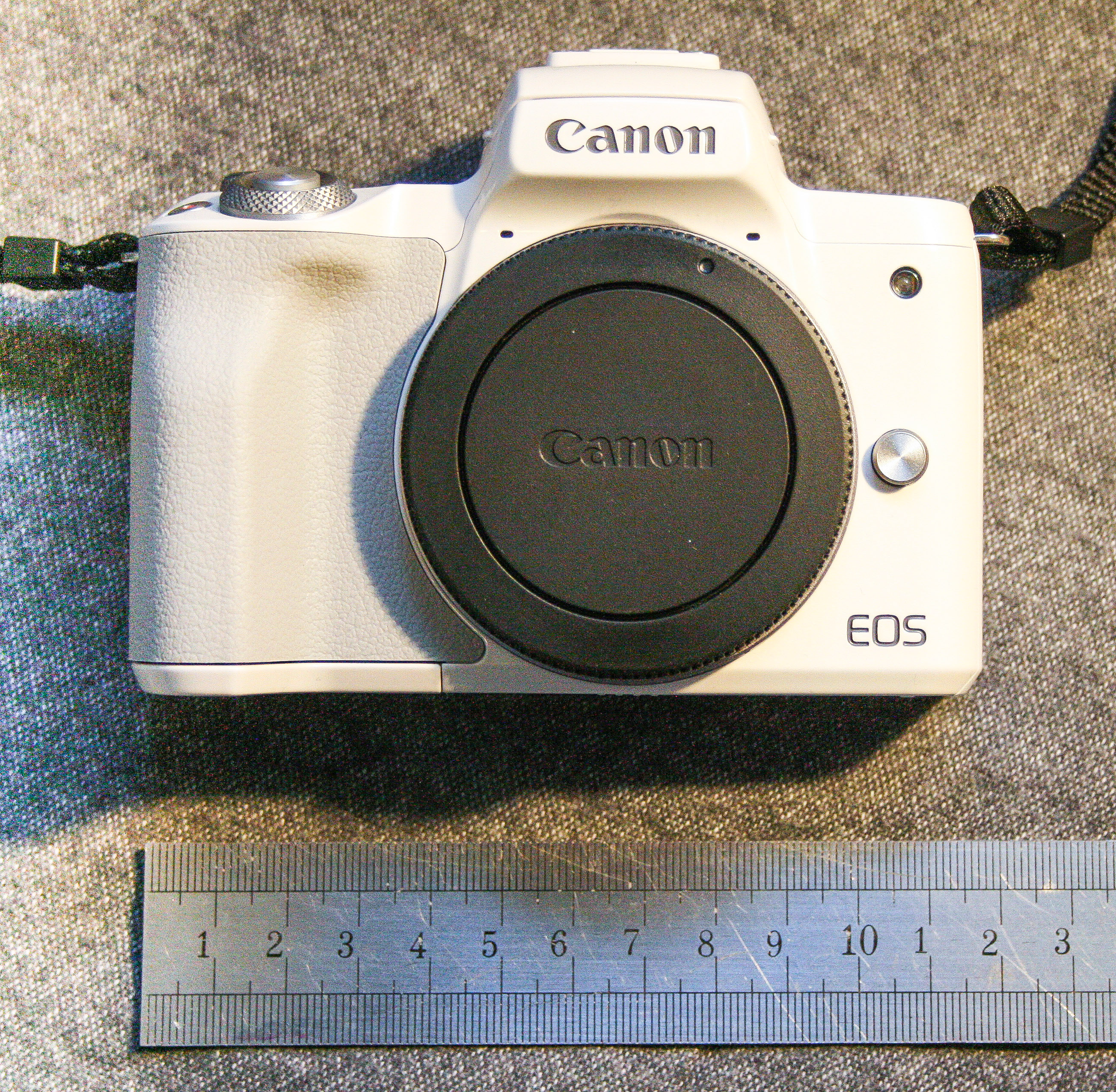

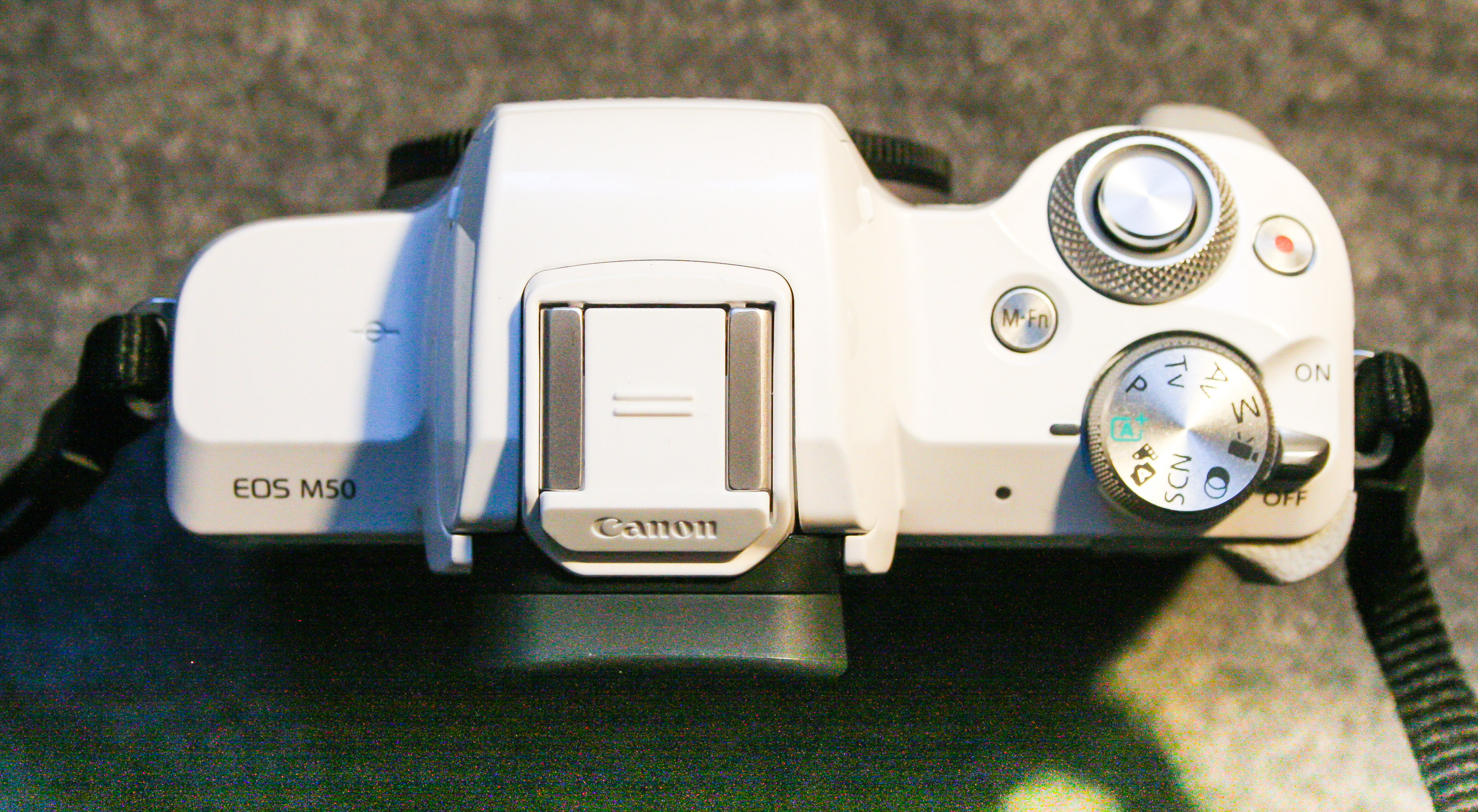

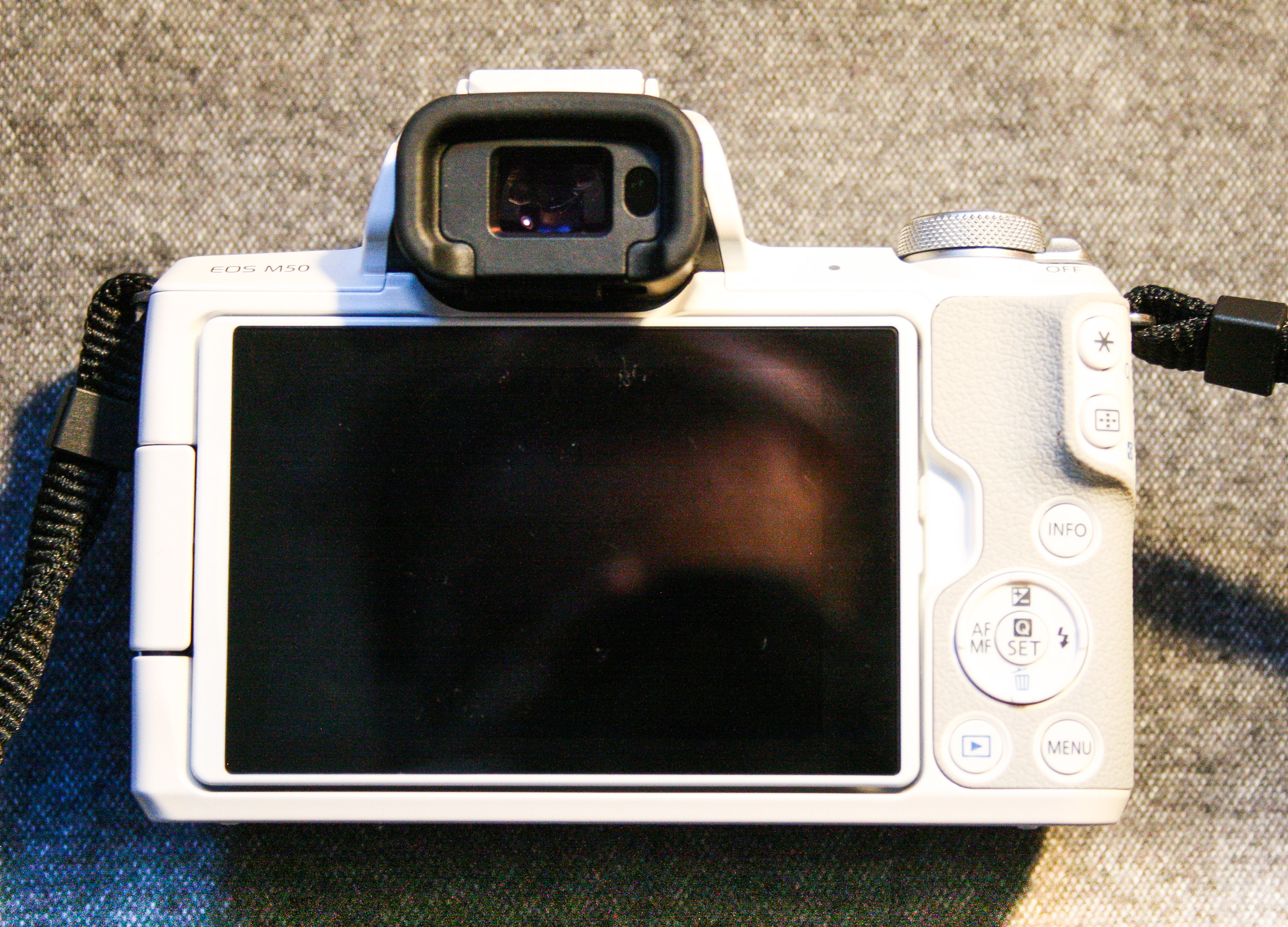

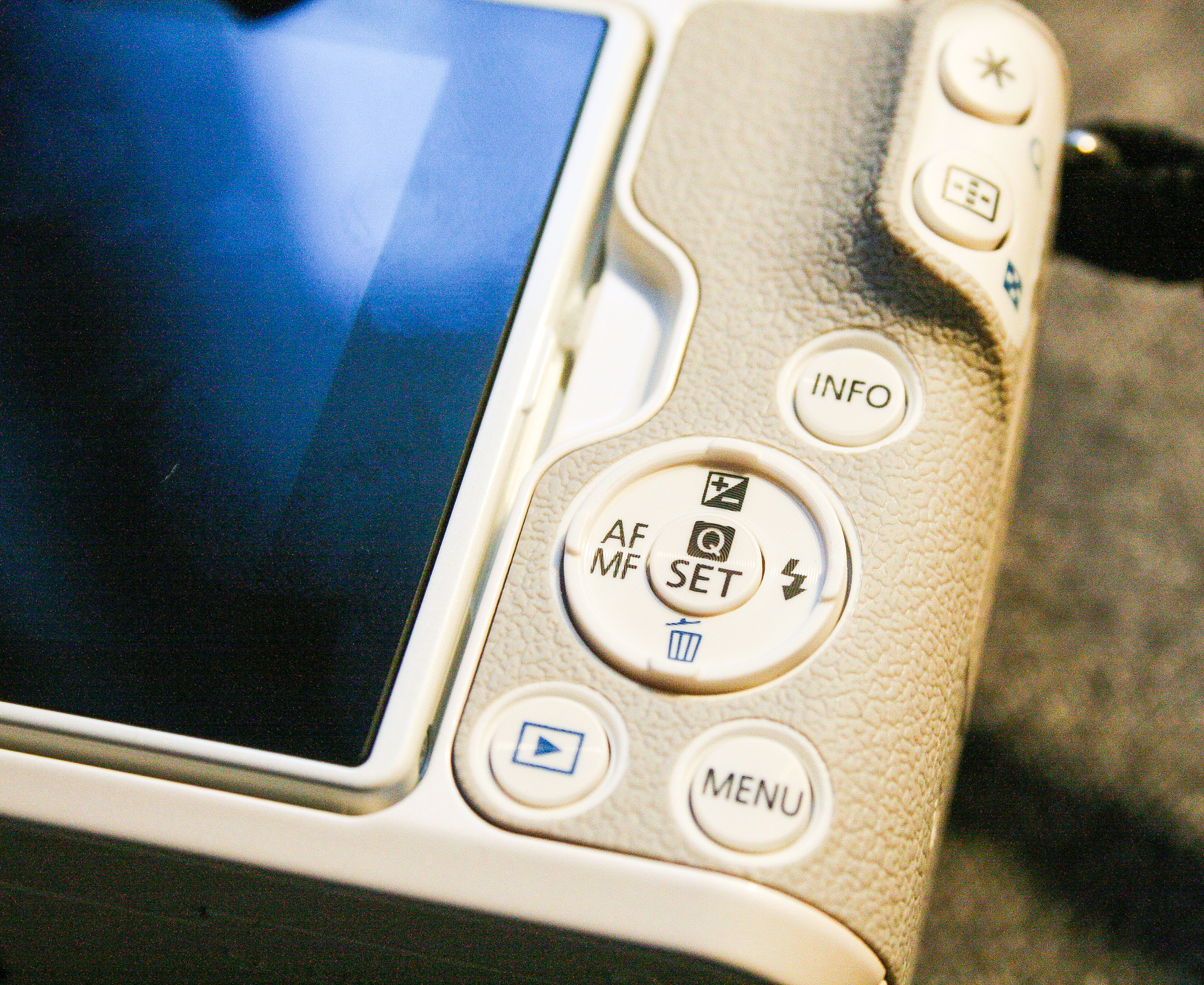

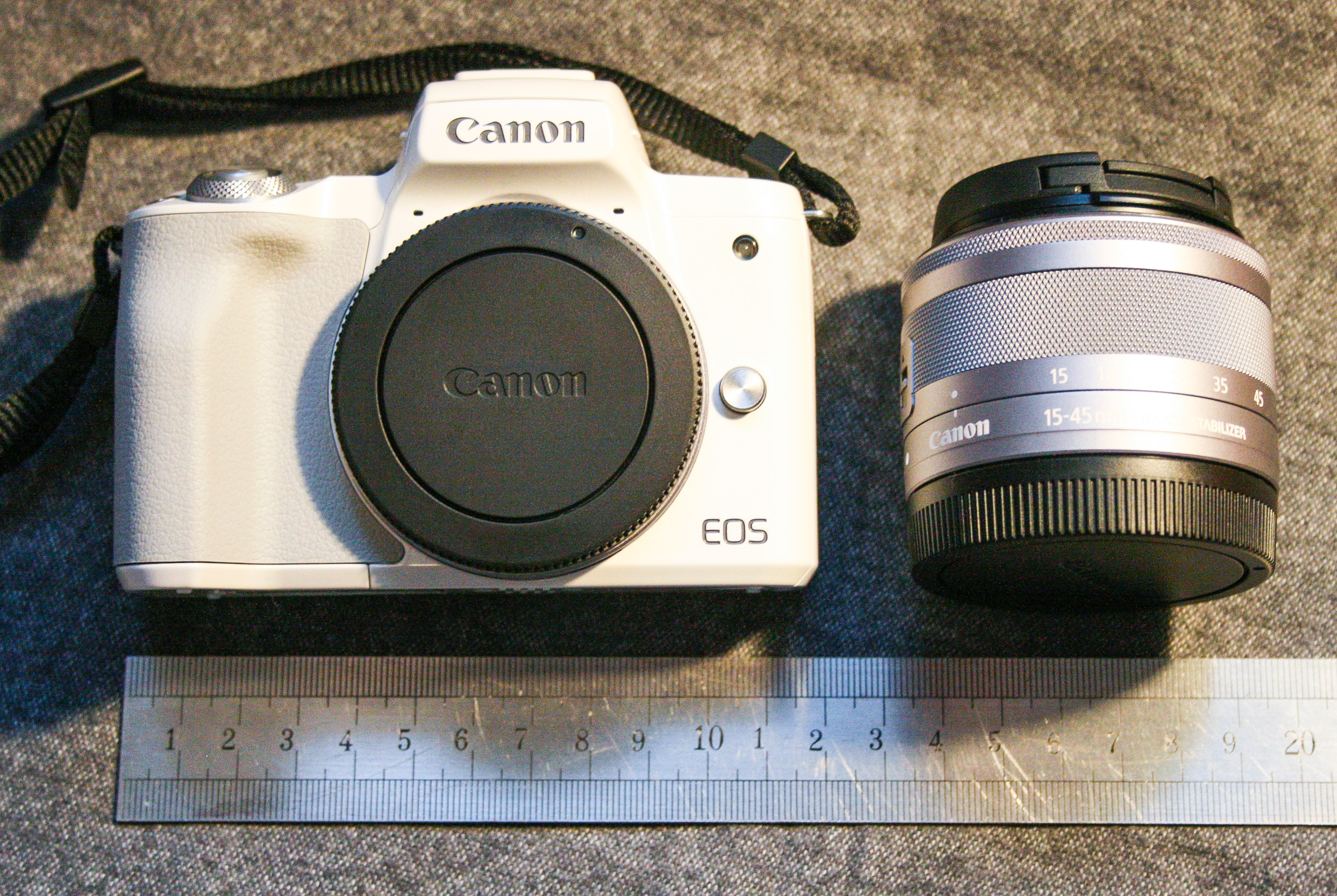

== Mark II ==
Its successor, the Canon EOS M50 Mark II was fielded in the US in October 2020. As of May 2023 sales of the M50 Mark II ended, marking the end of the Canon EOS M system.

== See also ==
- Canon EOS M
- Canon EOS M2
- Canon EOS M3
- Canon EOS M5
- Canon EOS M6
- Canon EOS M6 Mark II
- Canon EOS M10
- Canon EOS M100

| Sensor | Class | 12 | 13 | 14 | 15 | 16 | 17 | 18 | 19 | 20 | 21 | 22 | 23 | 24 | 25 |
|---|---|---|---|---|---|---|---|---|---|---|---|---|---|---|---|
| Full-frame | Flagship | | | | | | | | | | | | | | R1 ^{ATS} |
| Full-frame | Professional | | | | | | | | | | | R3 ^{ATS} | | | |
| Full-frame | Professional | | | | | | | | | | R5 ^{ATSR} | | | | R5 Mk II ^{ATSR} |
| Full-frame | Professional | | | | | | | | | | | R5 C ^{ATCR} | | | |
| Full-frame | Advanced | | | | | | | | | | R6 ^{ATS} | | R6 Mk II ^{ATS} | | |
| Full-frame | Advanced | | | | | | | | | Ra ^{AT} | | | | | |
| Full-frame | Advanced | | | | | | | | R ^{AT} | | | | | | |
| Full-frame | Midrange | | | | | | | | | | | | | R8 ^{AT} | |
| Full-frame | Entry/mid | | | | | | | | RP ^{AT} | | | | | | |
| APS-C | Advanced | | | | | | | | | | | | R7 ^{ATS} | | |
| APS-C | Midrange | | | | | | M5 ^{FT} | | | | | | R10 ^{AT} | | |
| APS-C | Entry/mid | | _{x} M ^{T} | M2 ^{T} | M3 ^{FT} | | | M6 ^{FT} | | M6 Mk II ^{FT} | | | | | |
| APS-C | Entry/mid | | | | | | | | M50 ^{AT} | | M50 Mk II ^{AT} | | | R50 ^{AT} | |
| APS-C | Entry/mid | | | | | | | | | | | | | | R50 V ^{AT} |
| APS-C | Entry | | | | | M10 ^{FT} | | M100 ^{FT} | | M200 ^{FT} | | | | R100 | |
| Sensor | Class | | | | | | | | | | | | | | |
| Sensor | Class | 12 | 13 | 14 | 15 | 16 | 17 | 18 | 19 | 20 | 21 | 22 | 23 | 24 | 25 |
