= Canon EOS M5 =

2016 APS-C mirrorless camera

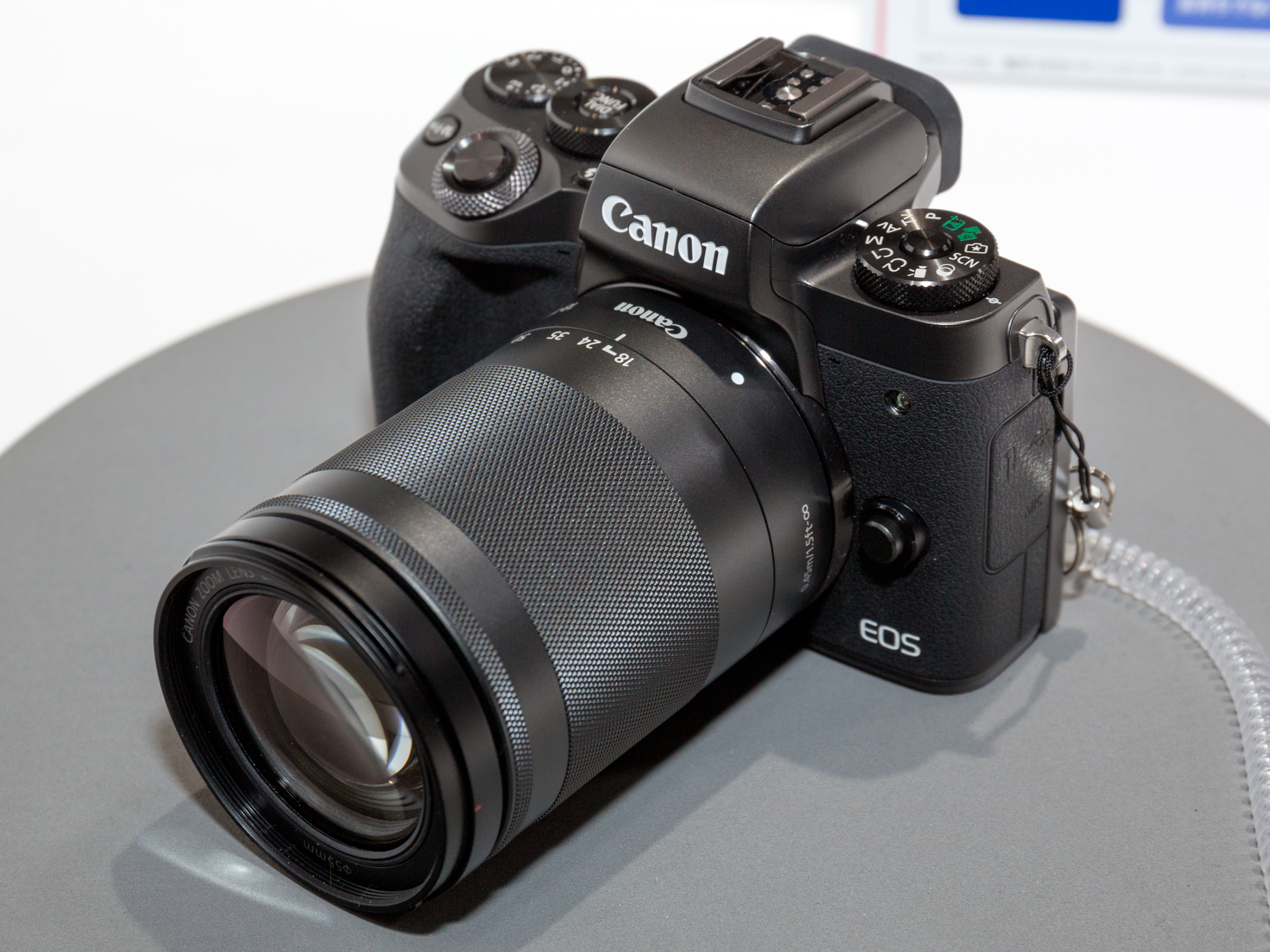

Overview
- Maker: Canon Inc.
- Type: Mirrorless interchangeable lens camera
- Intro price: $979.99

Lens
- Lens mount: Canon EF-M

Sensor/medium
- Sensor: dual-pixel CMOS sensor
- Sensor size: APS-C (22.3 × 14.9 mm)
- Maximum resolution: 24.2 MP
- Film speed: ISO 100-25600
- Recording medium: SDXC (UHS-I capable)

Focusing
- Focus: Dual Pixel CMOS autofocus

Shutter
- Frame rate: 9 fps; 7 fps with autofocus
- Shutter speeds: 30 s to 1/4000 s

Viewfinder
- Viewfinder: 2.36-million dot OLED EVF

Image processing
- Image processor: DIGIC 7

General
- Video recording: 1080p (60, 30 and 24 fps)
- LCD screen: 3.2 in 1.62-million-dot LCD
- Battery: LP-E17
- Data port(s): Wi-Fi, NFC, Bluetooth
- Dimensions: 116 mm × 89 mm × 61 mm (4.6 in × 3.5 in × 2.4 in)
- Weight: 427 g (15.1 oz)
- Replaced by: Canon EOS R10 (RF mirrorless)

The Canon EOS M5 is a digital mirrorless interchangeable-lens camera announced by Canon on September 15, 2016, and released in November 2016.

As with all of the Canon EOS M series cameras, the M5 uses the Canon EF-M lens mount. With the EF-EOS M adapter, any other Canon EF lens mount or Canon EF-S lens mount lens can be used.

The M5 is the first M series camera with an integrated electronic viewfinder. The screen is tiltable and can be articulated downwards, so that a vlogger can see themselves in the screen.

== Key features ==
- Canon EF-M lens mount
- 24.2 megapixel dual-pixel, APS-C, CMOS sensor. The same sensor is used in the Canon EOS 80D.
- ISO 100 – 25600
- Dual Pixel CMOS autofocus
- 1.62M-dot articulating touchscreen
- 2.36-million dot OLED built-in electronic viewfinder (EVF). The EOS M5 is the first Canon mirrorless with a built-in electronic viewfinder.
- DIGIC 7 processor

== Photo gallery ==

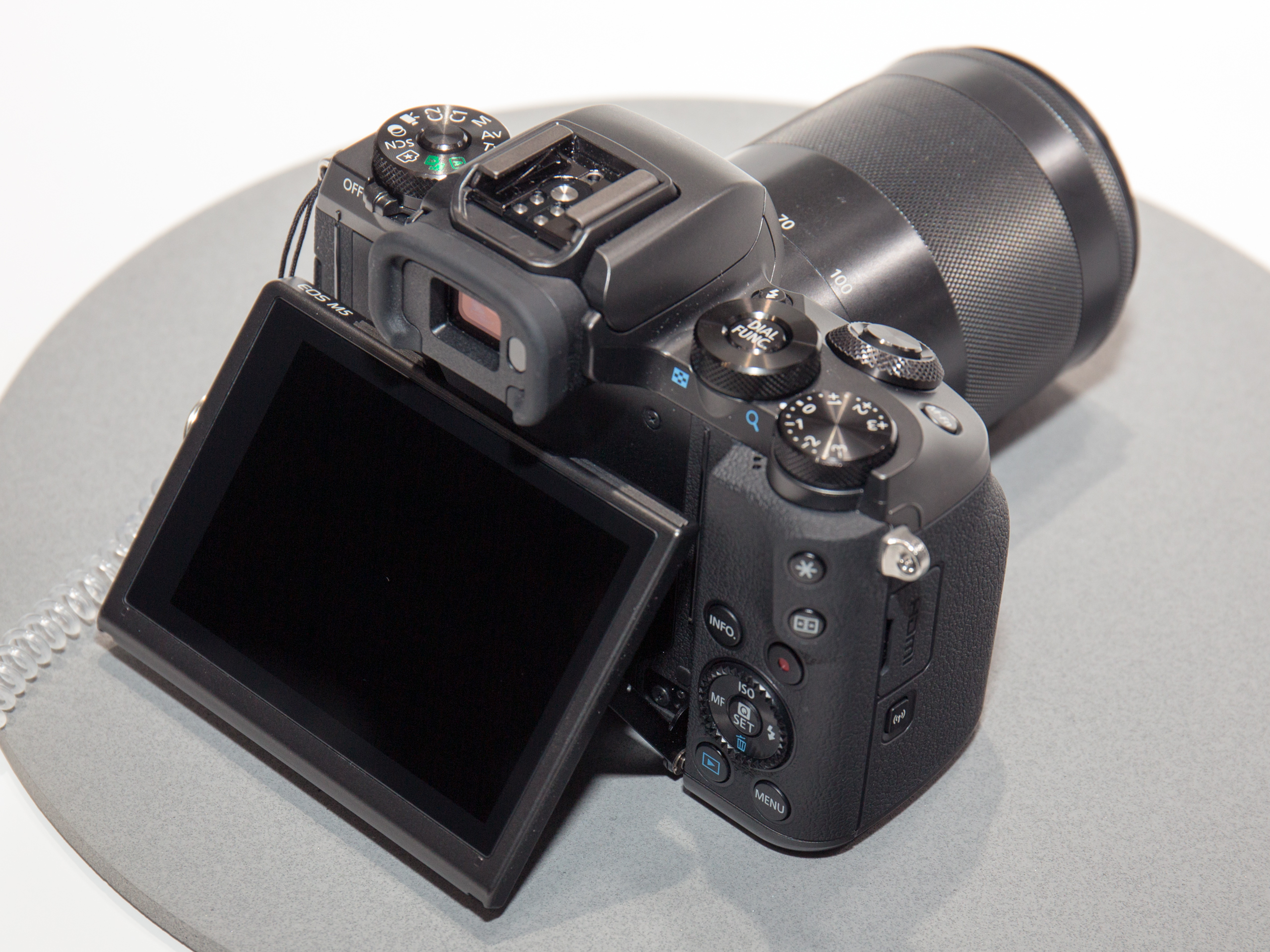

== See also ==
- Canon EOS M
- Canon EOS M2
- Canon EOS M3
- Canon EOS M6
- Canon EOS M10
- Canon EOS M50
- Canon EOS M100

Sensor	Class	12	13	14	15	16	17	18	19	20	21	22	23	24	25	26
Full-frame	Flagship														_{m} R1 ^{ATS}	
Full-frame	Professional											_{m} R3 ^{ATS}				
Full-frame	Professional										R5 ^{ATSR}				_{m} R5 Mk II ^{ATSR}	
Full-frame	Professional											_{m} R5 C ^{ATCR}				
Full-frame	Advanced										R6 ^{ATS}		_{m} R6 Mk II ^{ATS}			_{m} R6 Mk III ^{ATS}
Full-frame	Advanced															R6 V ^{ATS}
Full-frame	Advanced									Ra ^{AT}						
Full-frame	Advanced								R ^{AT}							
Full-frame	Midrange													_{m} R8 ^{AT}		_{m} R8 Mk II ^{ATS}
Full-frame	Entry/mid								RP ^{AT}							
APS-C	Advanced												_{m} R7 ^{ATS}			
APS-C	Midrange						M5 ^{FT}						_{m} R10 ^{AT}			
APS-C	Entry/mid		_{x} M ^{T}	M2 ^{T}	M3 ^{FT}			M6 ^{FT}		M6 Mk II ^{FT}						
APS-C	Entry/mid								M50 ^{AT}		M50 Mk II ^{AT}			_{m} R50 ^{AT}		
APS-C	Entry/mid															_{m} R50 V ^{AT}
APS-C	Entry					M10 ^{FT}		M100 ^{FT}		M200 ^{FT}				R100		
Sensor	Class															
Sensor	Class	12	13	14	15	16	17	18	19	20	21	22	23	24	25	26
