= M6 =

M6, M06, M.6, or M-6 may refer to:

== Entertainment ==
- Groupe M6, a French media holding company
  - M6 (TV channel), a French television channel
- Mike & The Mechanics (1999 album), by Mike & The Mechanics
- "M6", a song on the album Centralia by the metal band Car Bomb

== Military and weapons ==
- M6 bayonet, a bayonet for the M14 rifle
- M6 bomb service truck, a truck used to move bombs during World War II
- M6 gun motor carriage, an American World War II light truck armed with an anti-tank gun
- M6 gun, a 3" towed artillery piece
- M6 heavy tank, a World War II heavy tank design that never entered full production
- M6 Linebacker, an anti-aircraft variant of the M2 Bradley infantry fighting vehicle
- M6 mine, a United States metal-cased, circular anti-tank landmine
- C15TA armoured truck (Danish designation: M6 Mosegris)
- M6 tractor, a high-speed artillery tractor
- M6 mortar, a 60mm mortar used by the British Army
- Hirtenberger M6C-210 Commando, a 60mm mortar used by various armies
- LWRC M6, a series of US military carbines based on the M4 carbine
- Fokker M.6, a 1916 German two-seat experimental fighter aircraft
- Macchi M.6, a 1917 Italian flying boat fighter prototype

=== Survival guns ===
- M6 aircrew survival weapon, a .22 Hornet over .410 gauge combination gun
- Springfield Armory M6 Scout, a .22 LR over .410 gauge combination gun
- Chiappa M6 survival gun, a 12 gauge over .22 LR combination gun

== Science and technology ==
- Butterfly Cluster (catalogued as Messier 6 or M6), an open star cluster in the constellation Scorpius
- M6 (cipher), a block cipher used by Digital Transmission Content Protection
- M6, a British peak programme meter standard used for measuring the volume of audio broadcasts
- Meizu M6 miniPlayer, flash-based portable media player
- M6, one of the 1N400x rectifier diodes
- Apple M6, a system on a chip
- Leica M6, a rangefinder camera once popular among photojournalists
- Canon EOS M6, a mirrorless digital camera
- SureFire M6 Guardian, a flashlight
- M6, an ISO metric screw thread

== Transport ==
=== Automobiles ===
- BMW M6, a high-performance 6 Series automobile
- BYD M6 (2010), a minivan
- BYD M6 (2024), electric version of the BYD Song Max MPV
- BMW M30 or M06, a 1968 straight-6 engine
- M6 Presto-Matic, a semi-automatic transmission made by Chrysler
- McLaren M6A, a racing car built by McLaren for the Can-Am series
- Haima M6, a saloon
- Haval M6, an SUV
- Refine M6, an MPV
- Trumpchi M6, an MPV

=== Aviation ===
- Amerijet International (IATA airline designator: M6), a cargo airline based in the US
- Havre de Grace Seaplane Base (FAA LID: M06)
- Miles M.6 Hawcon, a 1930s British experimental monoplane
- M-6 aero-engine, a 1920 Soviet copy of the Hispano-Suiza 8Fb V-8 aero engine

=== Public transport ===
- Bucharest Metro Line M6, a planned metro line of the Bucharest Metro
- M6 (New York City bus), a former New York City Bus route in Manhattan
- M6 (Istanbul Metro), a short metro line in Istanbul, Turkey
- Sri Lanka Railways M6, a diesel-electric locomotive used in Sri Lanka
- M6 (railcar), a Metro-North Railroad railcar

=== Roads ===
- Frederik Meijer Trail, formerly the M-6 Trail, a bike trail running along the M-6 freeway in the Grand Rapids, Michigan area, US
- Highway M06 (Ukraine), a road in Ukraine
- M6 motorway, a motorway in the UK
  - M6 Toll, a toll motorway which relieves traffic on the neighbouring M6
- M-6 (Michigan highway), a state highway in the Grand Rapids, Michigan area, US
- M6 highway (Russia), linking Moscow to the Caspian Sea
- M6 motorway (Hungary), a north–south motorway connecting Budapest to Pécs and Croatia
- M6 motorway (Ireland), a motorway forming part of the N6 Dublin to Galway national primary route
- M6 road (Zambia), in Zambia
- M6 road (Malawi), in Malawi
- M6 Motorway (Sydney), a proposed motorway in New South Wales, Australia

==== South Africa ====
- M6 (Cape Town), a Metropolitan Route in Cape Town
- M6 (Johannesburg), a Metropolitan Route in Johannesburg
- M6 (Pretoria), a Metropolitan Route in Pretoria
- M6 (Gqeberha), a Metropolitan Route in Gqeberha/Port Elizabeth

=== Other transport ===
- Ursynów M-6, a prototype hovercraft

== People ==
- Mark Sixma (born 1983), Dutch trance and house producer
- Mohammed VI of Morocco (born 1963), King of Morocco
- Raúl Meza Ontiveros (1966–2007), Mexican suspected drug lord, nicknamed "M6"

== Other uses ==
- M6, a difficulty grade in mixed climbing
- MLBB M6 World Championship, the sixth Mobile Legends: Bang Bang World Championship held in 2024

== See also ==
- 6M (disambiguation)
- M6X, in the List of Metrobus routes (Washington, D.C.), US
