= M6 bomb service truck =

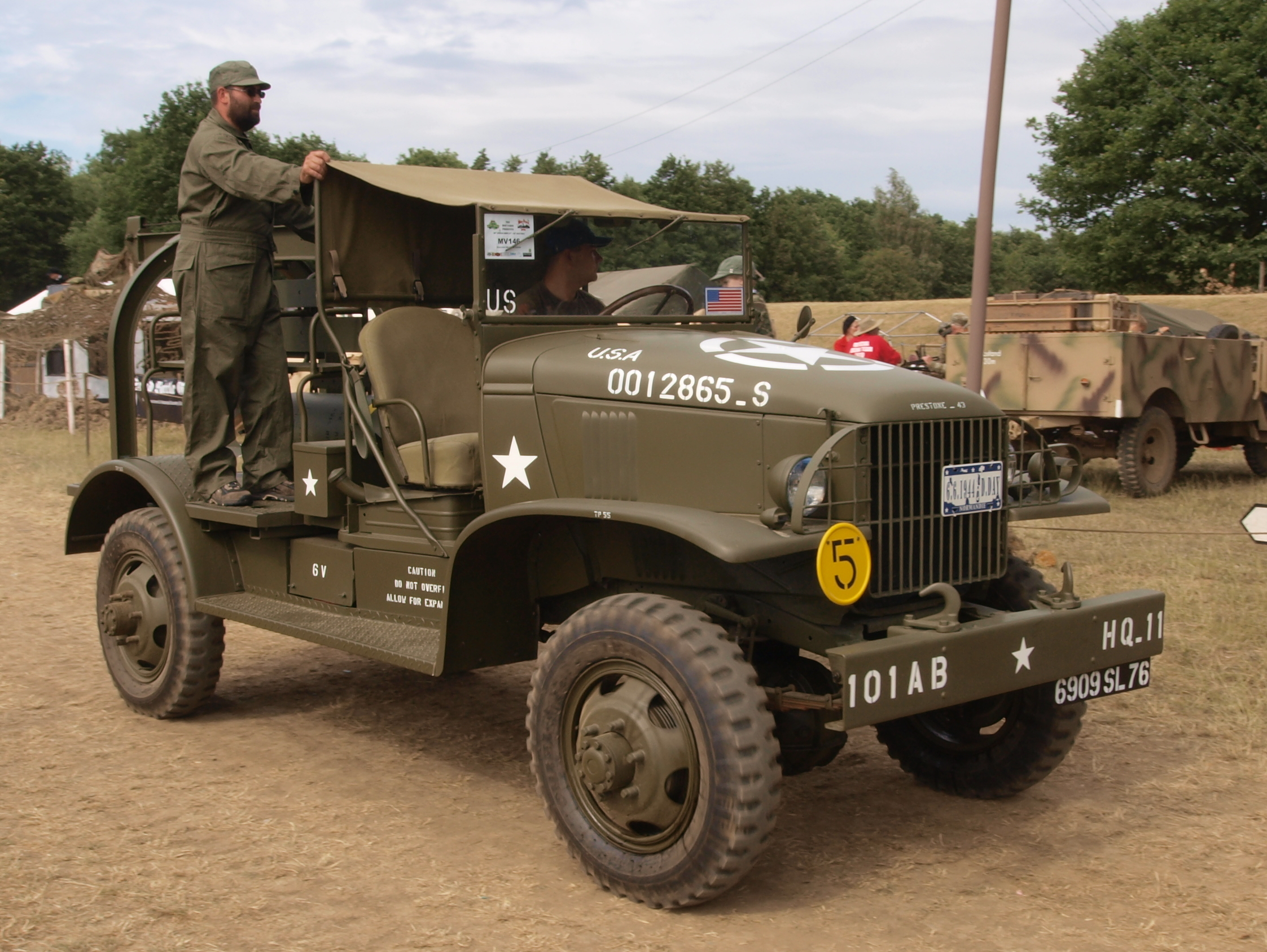
- Frontal view of an M6 bomb service truck
- Type: truck
- Place of origin: United States

Production history
- Designer: Chevrolet
- Manufacturer: Chevrolet
- Produced: 1942 – September 1944
- No. built: up to 7,000

Specifications
- Mass: 6,040 pounds (2.74 t) (unloaded), 6,324 pounds (2.869 t) (loaded)
- Length: wheelbase: 125 in (3.2 m)
- Width: 6 ft (1.8 m)
- Engine: Chevrolet, six-cylinder, 236-cubic-inch (3,870 cc); 83 hp (62 kW)
- Fuel capacity: 48 US gal (180 L)
- Operational range: 125 mi (201 km)

The M6 bomb service truck is a truck that was produced by Chevrolet during World War II. The M6 was a 1.5-tonne (1.7-short-ton) 4×x4 truck that was used to tow M5 bomb trailers around on airfields. It could move up to five M5 trailers at once. It used a winch on the rear to load and unload trailers.

It could also be used to tow ammunition around an ammunition dump. The truck was designated as an M6 Chevrolet bomb service truck. Chevrolet produced about 7,000 of these trucks during World War II. It was soon replaced by GMC CCKW-based M27 bomb service truck.

== Specifications ==
The M6 bomb service truck was a 4×4 truck with a wheelbase of 125 in (3.2 m), a width of 6 ft (1.8 m), and a weight of 6,040 pounds (2.74 t), when unloaded, and a weight of 6,324 pounds (2.869 t) when loaded. It was powered by an 83 hp (62 kW), six-cylinder, Chevrolet, 236-cubic-inch (3,870 cc) engine. The engine had two fuel tanks with a total capacity of 48 US gal (180 L) and a range of 125 mi (201 km).

== Design and use ==
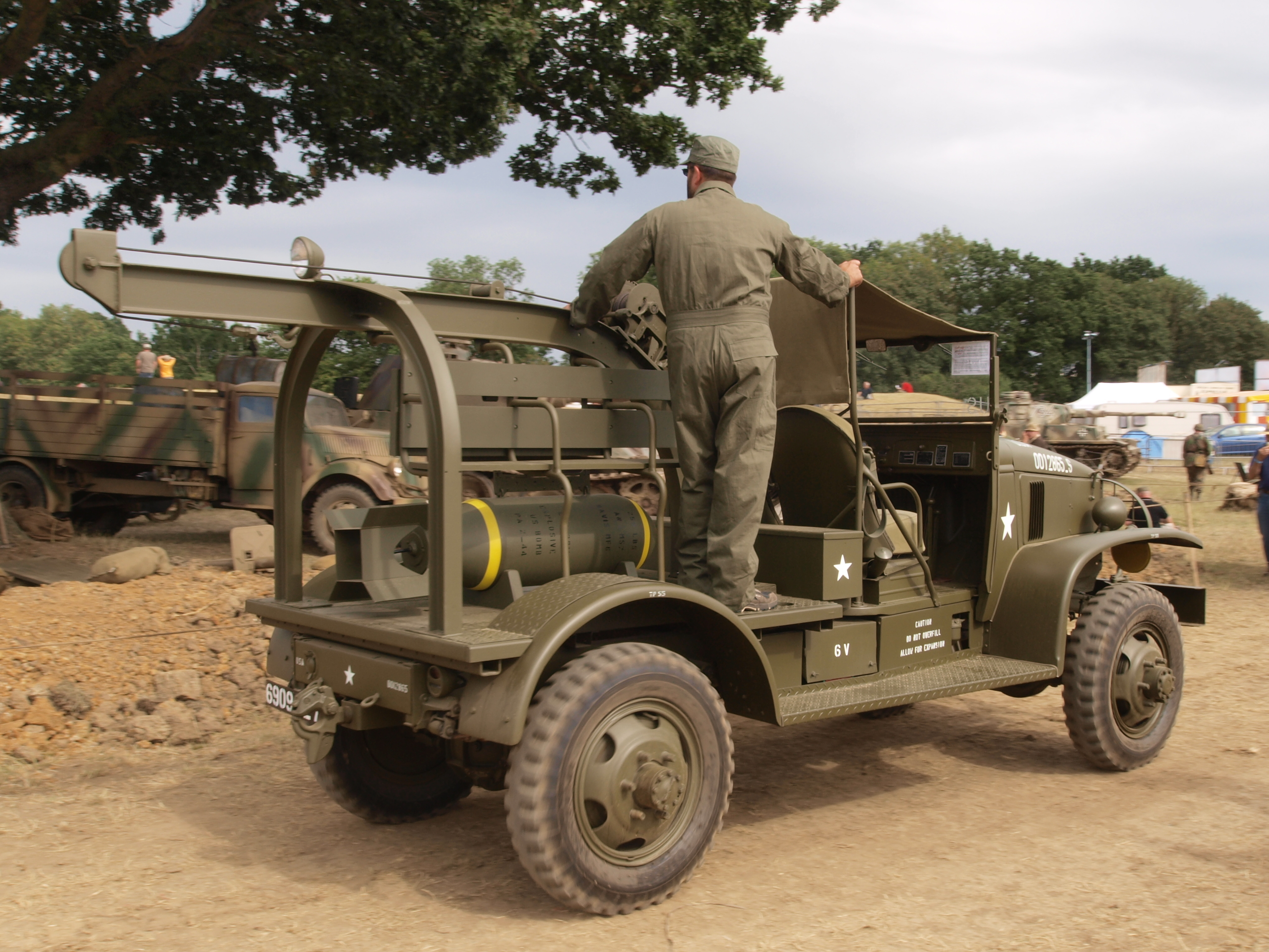
Rear view of an M6

The M6 bomb service truck, unlike many other trucks in its family, had an open cab with no solid roof and no doors. It normally had a canvas roof over the driver's compartment. In hotter areas, the canvas roof could be removed and the windshield folded down for extra ventilation.

It had a rear area where it could carry ammunition, since it could be used in ammunition dumps to carry ammunition around the dump. The M6 also was equipped with a winterization kit that included: an insulated battery box with a heating coil, a gasoline heater to heat the battery, and a petcock for the bottom of the fuel tank (for easy releasing of cold air and pressure from the gasoline tank).

=== Winches and hoists used ===
Before mid-1943, the M6 was not equipped with a spare tire and had a Beebee hoist, while after mid-1943 the Beebee hoist was replaced with either a Holan hoist or a Braden winch; the Braden winch did not prove satisfactory, so a modification order was issued to replace them. With the winches and hoists, the M6 could haul up to five M5 bomb trailers at once around airfields.

== Production history ==
7,000 M6s were produced by Chevrolet in World War II from 1942 to September 1944. Production of the vehicle ended as a new bomb truck, the M27 (which was based on the GMC CCKW), had newly entered production and was seen as superior.

== See also ==
- List of U.S. military vehicles by supply catalog designation (G-7128)
