= Canon EOS M200 =

2019 APS-C mirrorless camera

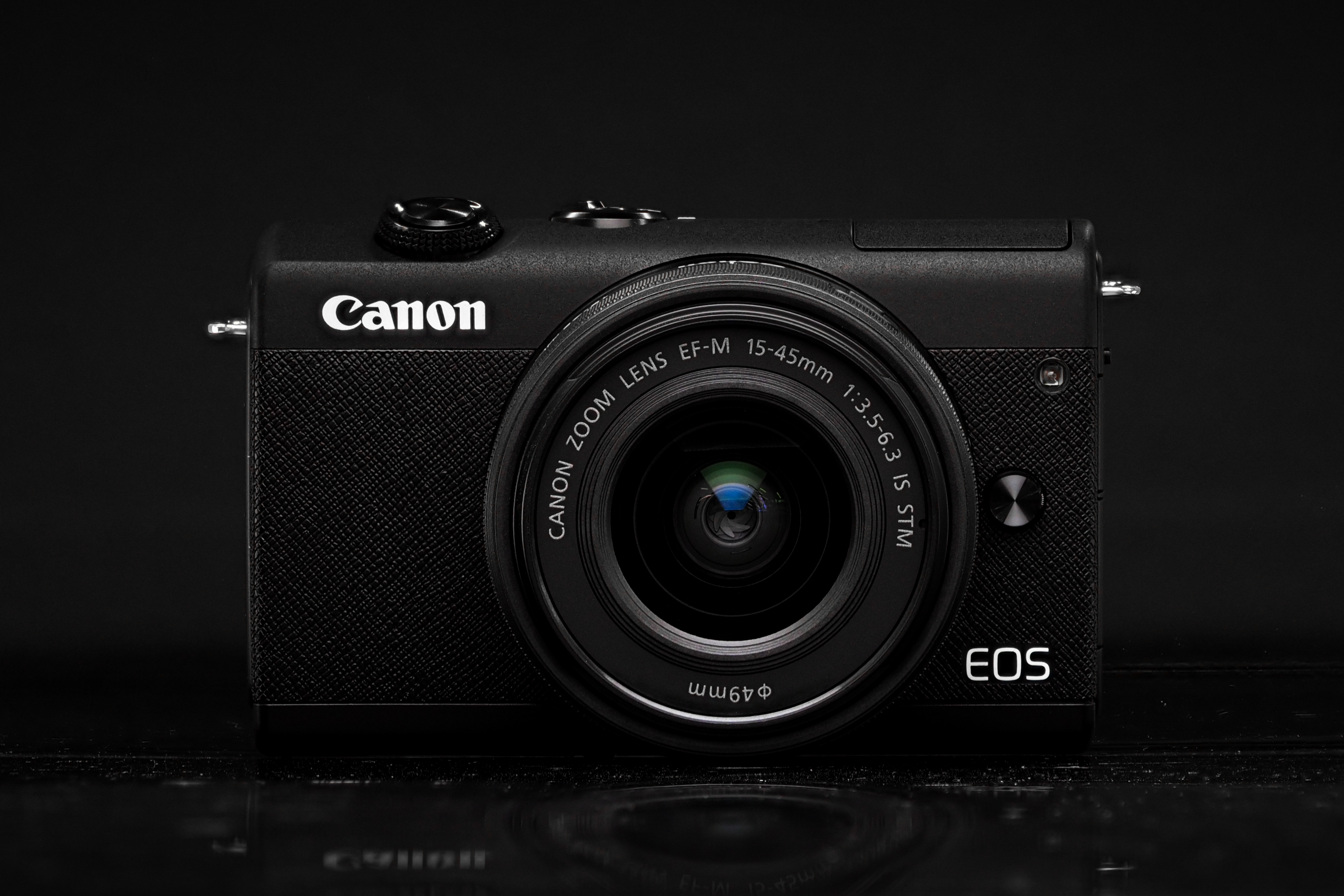

Overview
- Maker: Canon Inc.
- Type: Mirrorless interchangeable lens camera

Lens
- Lens mount: Canon EF-M
- Lens: Interchangeable

Sensor/medium
- Sensor type: CMOS
- Sensor size: APS-C (22.3 × 14.9 mm)
- Maximum resolution: 6000 × 4000 (24 megapixels)
- Recording medium: SD, SDHC or SDXC memory card

Focusing
- Focus areas: 143 focus points

Shutter
- Shutter speeds: 1/4000 s to 30 s
- Continuous shooting: without autofocus 89 frames with 6.1 fps, with autofocus 1000 frames with 4 fps

Image processing
- Image processor: DIGIC 8
- White balance: Yes

General
- Video recording: 1080p (60, 30 and 24 fps)
- LCD screen: 3" with 1,040,000 dots
- Battery: LP-E12
- Data port(s): Wi-Fi, NFC, Bluetooth
- Dimensions: 108.2 mm × 67.1 mm × 35.1 mm (4.26 in × 2.64 in × 1.38 in)
- Weight: 299 g (11 oz) (0.659 lb) including battery

Chronology
- Predecessor: Canon EOS M100
- Replaced by: Canon EOS R100 (RF mirrorless)

The Canon EOS M200 is a digital mirrorless interchangeable-lens camera first announced by Canon Inc. on September 25, 2019. Canon EOS M200 incorporates the proprietary image processor that allows the camera to capture still images up to 6.1 fps using the fixed focus and 4 fps burst mode. The EOS M200 can be connected to all EF, EF-S and TS-E lenses with an available adapter.

== Design ==
The EOS M200 is an interchangeable lens camera that uses the Canon EF-M lens mount. The EOS M200 is an entry-level model which lacks the large rubber grip, multiple control dials, and hot shoe flash. The EOS M200 uses the same 24.2 MP APS-C sensor as the Canon EOS M100. The EOS M200 also uses the Dual Pixel CMOS autofocus system. The EOS M200 features the same DIGIC 8 image processor as the newer Canon EOS M6 Mark II.

Videos can be recorded in 4k at 25 fps, 1080p up to ~60 fps or 720p resolution up to ~120 fps.

== Sales ==
In its initial press release announcing the camera, Canon revealed that the camera would be sold in a kit including the EOS M200 and an EF-M 15-45mm f/3.5-6.3 IS STM zoom lens at a retail price of $549.99.

Sensor	Class	12	13	14	15	16	17	18	19	20	21	22	23	24	25	26
Full-frame	Flagship														_{m} R1 ^{ATS}	
Full-frame	Professional											_{m} R3 ^{ATS}				
Full-frame	Professional										R5 ^{ATSR}				_{m} R5 Mk II ^{ATSR}	
Full-frame	Professional											_{m} R5 C ^{ATCR}				
Full-frame	Advanced										R6 ^{ATS}		_{m} R6 Mk II ^{ATS}			_{m} R6 Mk III ^{ATS}
Full-frame	Advanced															R6 V ^{ATS}
Full-frame	Advanced									Ra ^{AT}						
Full-frame	Advanced								R ^{AT}							
Full-frame	Midrange													_{m} R8 ^{AT}		
Full-frame	Entry/mid								RP ^{AT}							
APS-C	Advanced												_{m} R7 ^{ATS}			
APS-C	Midrange						M5 ^{FT}						_{m} R10 ^{AT}			
APS-C	Entry/mid		_{x} M ^{T}	M2 ^{T}	M3 ^{FT}			M6 ^{FT}		M6 Mk II ^{FT}						
APS-C	Entry/mid								M50 ^{AT}		M50 Mk II ^{AT}			_{m} R50 ^{AT}		
APS-C	Entry/mid															_{m} R50 V ^{AT}
APS-C	Entry					M10 ^{FT}		M100 ^{FT}		M200 ^{FT}				R100		
Sensor	Class															
Sensor	Class	12	13	14	15	16	17	18	19	20	21	22	23	24	25	26
