= Canon EF-M 18–55mm lens =

Canon EF-M 18-55mm f/3.5-5.6 IS STM
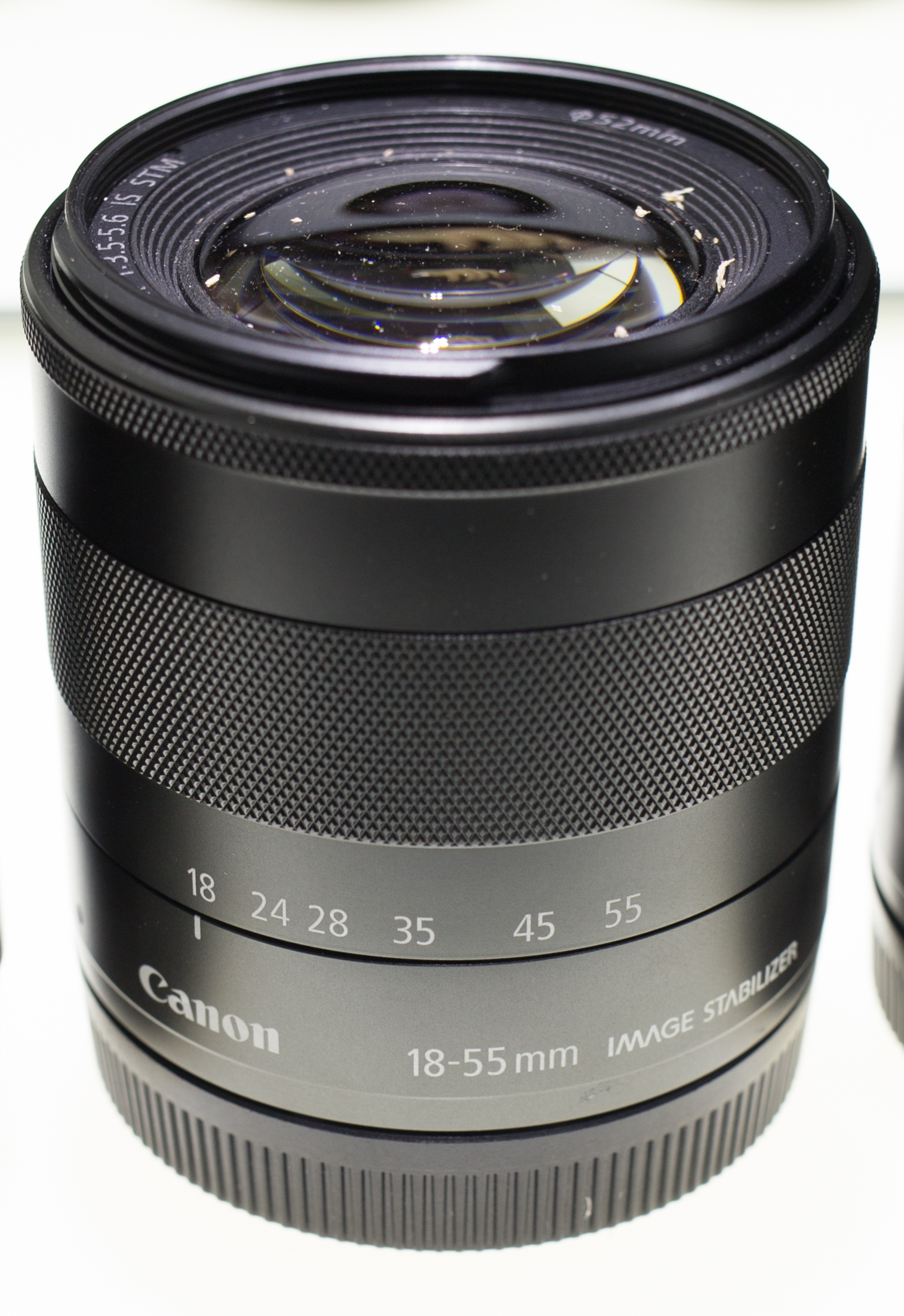
- Maker: Canon
- Lens mount: Canon EF-M

Technical data
- Type: Zoom
- Focus drive: Stepping motor
- Focal length: 18-55mm
- Focal length (35mm equiv.): 29-88mm
- Crop factor: 1.6
- Aperture (max/min): f/3.5-5.6 / f/22–38(36) (smaller value for 1/3 steps)
- Close focus distance: 0.25 metres (0.82 ft)
- Max. magnification: 0.25
- Diaphragm blades: 7
- Construction: 13 elements in 11 groups

Features
- Weather-sealing: No No
- Lens-based stabilization: Yes Yes

Physical
- Max. length: 61 millimetres (2.4 in)
- Diameter: 60.9 millimetres (2.40 in)
- Weight: 210 grams (0.46 lb)
- Filter diameter: 52mm

Accessories
- Lens hood: EW-54
- Case: LP814

Angle of view
- Horizontal: 64° 30′ - 23° 20′
- Vertical: 45° 30′- 15° 40′
- Diagonal: 74° 20′ - 27° 50′

History
- Introduction: 2012
- Discontinuation: 2018

Retail info
- MSRP: 299,00 € (as of July 2015)

The Canon EF-M 18-55mm f/3.5-5.6 IS STM is an interchangeable standard zoom lens for the Canon EOS M system of mirrorless cameras. It was announced by Canon Inc. on June 22, 2012. It was the kit lens of the Canon EOS M camera. The EOS M3 camera was only available with this kit lens. This lens was available from Canon USA from 2015 to 2018.

== See also ==
- List of standard zoom lenses
