= 6M =

6M or 6-M can refer to:

- 6m, or 6 metres
  - 6-meter band
- NJ 6M, now New Jersey Route 159
- Elliott 6m, an Olympic-class keelboat
- 6 Metre, a class of racing yachts
- Period-after-opening symbol
- Lim-6M, a model of PZL-Mielec Lim-6
- PMD-6M, a model of PMD series mines
- VF-6M, see VMFA-232
- VB-6M, see VMF-132
- 6M-GE, a model of Toyota M engine
- Yorkfield 6M, a model of Yorkfield
- Welch OW-6M, see Welch OW-5M
- MH-6M, model of MD Helicopters MH-6 Little Bird
- H-6M, a model of Xian H-6
- E-6M series, see Luna 13
- 6M, the production code for the 1984 Doctor Who serial The Awakening

== See also ==
- M6 (disambiguation)
