= Canon EOS M =

2012 APS-C mirrorless camera

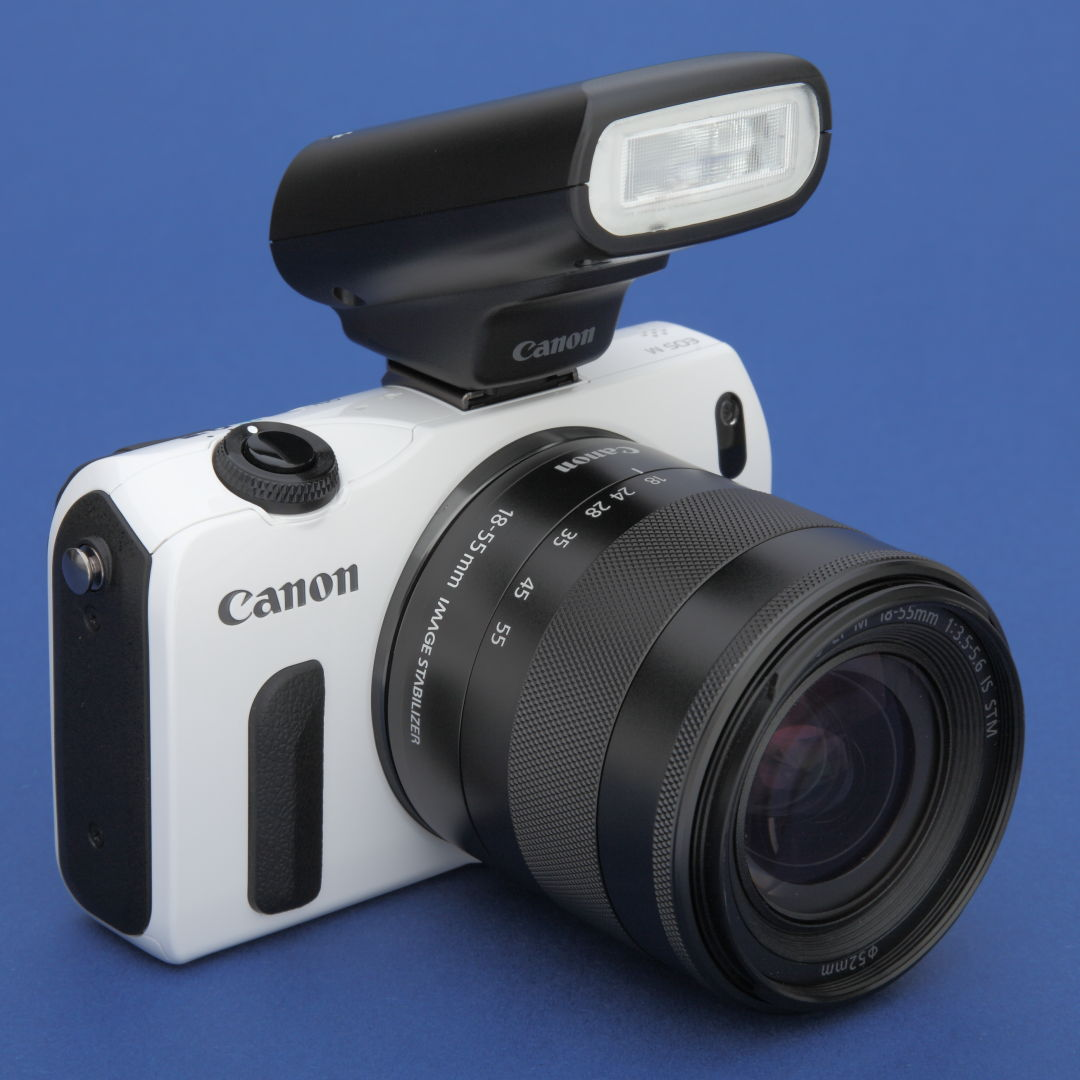

Overview
- Maker: Canon
- Type: Mirrorless interchangeable lens camera

Lens
- Lens mount: Canon EF-M
- Lens: Interchangeable

Sensor/medium
- Sensor type: CMOS
- Sensor size: APS-C (22.3 × 14.9 mm)
- Maximum resolution: 5184 x 3456 (18 megapixels)
- Film format: JPEG, RAW
- Recording medium: SD, SDHC, SDXC

Shutter
- Shutter: Electronically-controlled vertical-travel focal-plane shutter
- Shutter speeds: 30 s to 1/4000 s and bulb
- Continuous shooting: 4.3 frames per second
- Image processor: DIGIC 5

General
- LCD screen: 3 in, 1,040,000 dots
- Battery: LP-E12
- Dimensions: 108.6 mm × 66.5 mm × 32.3 mm
- Weight: 262 g (9 oz) (0.578 lb)
- Made in: Japan

Chronology
- Successor: Canon EOS M2

Canon EOS M is the first mirrorless interchangeable-lens camera produced by Canon.

DPReview noted that the EOS M is effectively a miniature version of the Canon EOS 650D, which was introduced in June 2012, with a simpler physical interface. The letter M in EOS M stands for "mobility" and EOS means "electro-optical system".

It was superseded by the Canon EOS M2 in late 2013; the Canon EOS M10 in October 2015; the Canon EOS M100 in August 2017; and the Canon EOS M200 in September 2019.

== Design ==
The camera has a 3-inch touchscreen with support for multi-touch gestures such as pinch to zoom, swiping and tapping. The camera uses an 18 megapixel APS-C sensor and a DIGIC 5 processor, similar to the Canon EOS 650D.

The camera uses an EF-M lens mount which can accept Canon EF and EF-S lenses with an additional mount adapter. Several EF-M lenses, including a 11–22mm f/4–5.6 IS STM, a 22mm f/2 STM pancake lens, an 18–55mm f/3.5–5.6 IS STM, and a 55–200mm f/4.5–6.3 IS STM are available.

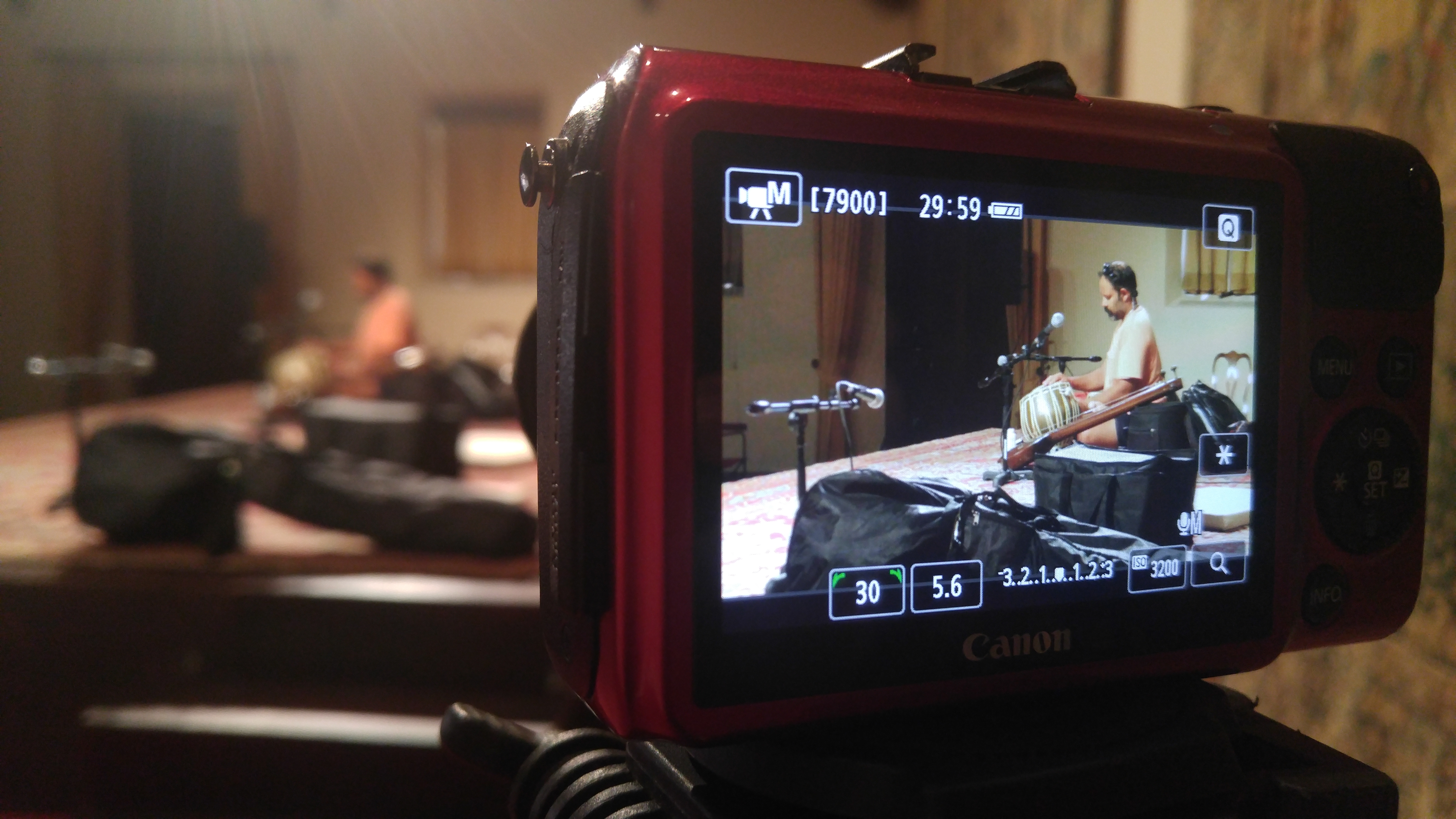
Canon EOS M (red body) on a tripod shooting with manual settings.

The camera does not include a built-in flash, but launched with a dedicated Canon Speedlite 90EX, part of a bundle pack for this camera in some markets. The camera is capable of supporting Standard Definition video at 30 fps or 25 fps, 720p HD video at 60 fps or 50 fps, and 1080p Full HD video at 30 fps, 24 fps or 25 fps.

=== Firmware updates ===
On 27 June 2013, firmware version 2.0.2 was released with Improved focusing speed in One-Shot AF mode, among other fixes and improvements. The firmware update did in fact markedly improve the EOS M's speed over the camera's initial firmware, but its autofocus performance was reportedly still not as fast as many other compact system cameras.

On 28 November 2016, firmware version 2.0.3 was released. As per the official note: Corrects a phenomenon in which when using the camera with the EF-S 18–135 mm f/3.5–5.6 IS USM or EF 70–300 mm f/4–5.6 IS II USM lens, even if lens aberration correction is set to "Enable", correction will not be applied.

=== Custom firmware ===
Magic Lantern is an open source (GPL) firmware add-on for some Canon DSLR cameras, which has enhancements for video and still photography without replacing the stock firmware. The Canon EOS M is compatible with Magic Lantern firmware.

== See also ==
- Canon EOS R
- List of smallest mirrorless cameras

Sensor	Class	12	13	14	15	16	17	18	19	20	21	22	23	24	25
Full-frame	Flagship														R1 ^{ATS}
Full-frame	Professional											R3 ^{ATS}			
Full-frame	Professional										R5 ^{ATSR}				R5 Mk II ^{ATSR}
Full-frame	Professional											R5 C ^{ATCR}			
Full-frame	Advanced										R6 ^{ATS}		R6 Mk II ^{ATS}		
Full-frame	Advanced									Ra ^{AT}					
Full-frame	Advanced								R ^{AT}						
Full-frame	Midrange													R8 ^{AT}	
Full-frame	Entry/mid								RP ^{AT}						
APS-C	Advanced												R7 ^{ATS}		
APS-C	Midrange						M5 ^{FT}						R10 ^{AT}		
APS-C	Entry/mid		_{x} M ^{T}	M2 ^{T}	M3 ^{FT}			M6 ^{FT}		M6 Mk II ^{FT}					
APS-C	Entry/mid								M50 ^{AT}		M50 Mk II ^{AT}			R50 ^{AT}	
APS-C	Entry/mid														R50 V ^{AT}
APS-C	Entry					M10 ^{FT}		M100 ^{FT}		M200 ^{FT}				R100	
Sensor	Class														
Sensor	Class	12	13	14	15	16	17	18	19	20	21	22	23	24	25
