= M5 bomb trailer =

US bomb transport vehicle

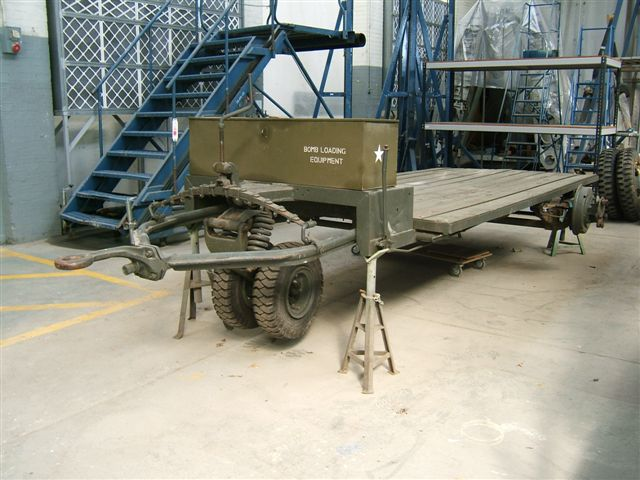
Restored M5 at Duxford

The M5 bomb trailer is a 2½ ton capacity vehicle used during World War II for transporting bombs from munitions storage areas to the aircraft for loading. Up to six M5s can be towed in a train. The trailer weighs 7,200 pounds when fully loaded. The front pair of wheels are mounted on a caster assembly like a shopping cart. They are free to rotate 360 degrees about their vertical axes. There is a damper assembly that resembles 1/2 of a disk brake rotor that has friction pucks pressing against it to damp oscillations of the caster assembly. These trailers would be towed out to the flightline all hitched together like a train and the train would stop at the first bomber and the last trailer in the train would be disconnected. The train would then continue on to the next bomber. After the train left, the crew would manhandle the trailer to a position under the bomber to enable the loading of the bombs. The front caster wheel assembly made this relatively easy. And so each trailer would be detached and when the towing vehicle had left the last trailer, it would circle around and go back and pick up the now empty first trailer detached. Then it would proceed to pick the rest of the trailers, one at a time.

== History ==
These trailers were used extensively in World War II on air bases for the transport of bombs and other ordnance. Many were also used in the Korean War and Vietnam War as well. Versions include the M1 and M2 chemical trailer. these were usually towed by the M1 bomb service truck, 1½-ton, 4×4, (Ford) and M6 bomb service truck, 1½-ton, 4×4, (Chevy).

== Specifications ==
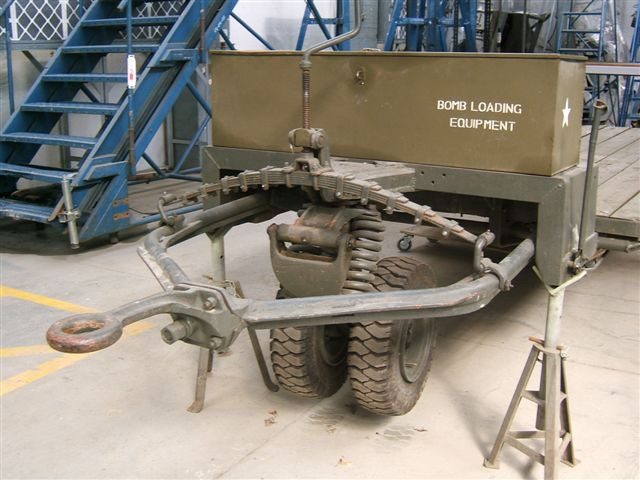
Note hand brake on the right side

- Net weight: 2,200 lb (997.9 kg)
- Payload: 5,000 lb (2,268.0 kg)
- Length: 17 ft 6 in (5.3 m)
- Width: 7 ft 4 in (2.2 m)
- Height: 3 ft 11.5 in (1.2 m)
- Wheelbase: 102 in (2.6 m)
- Ground clearance : 9.5 in (241 mm)
- Road speed: 45 mph (72.4 km/h)
- Off-road speed: 20 mph (32.2 km/h)
- Front tires: 6-ply 6.5 in × 10 in (165 mm × 254 mm)
- Rear tires: 8-ply 7.5 in × 18 in (191 mm × 457 mm)

== Survivors ==
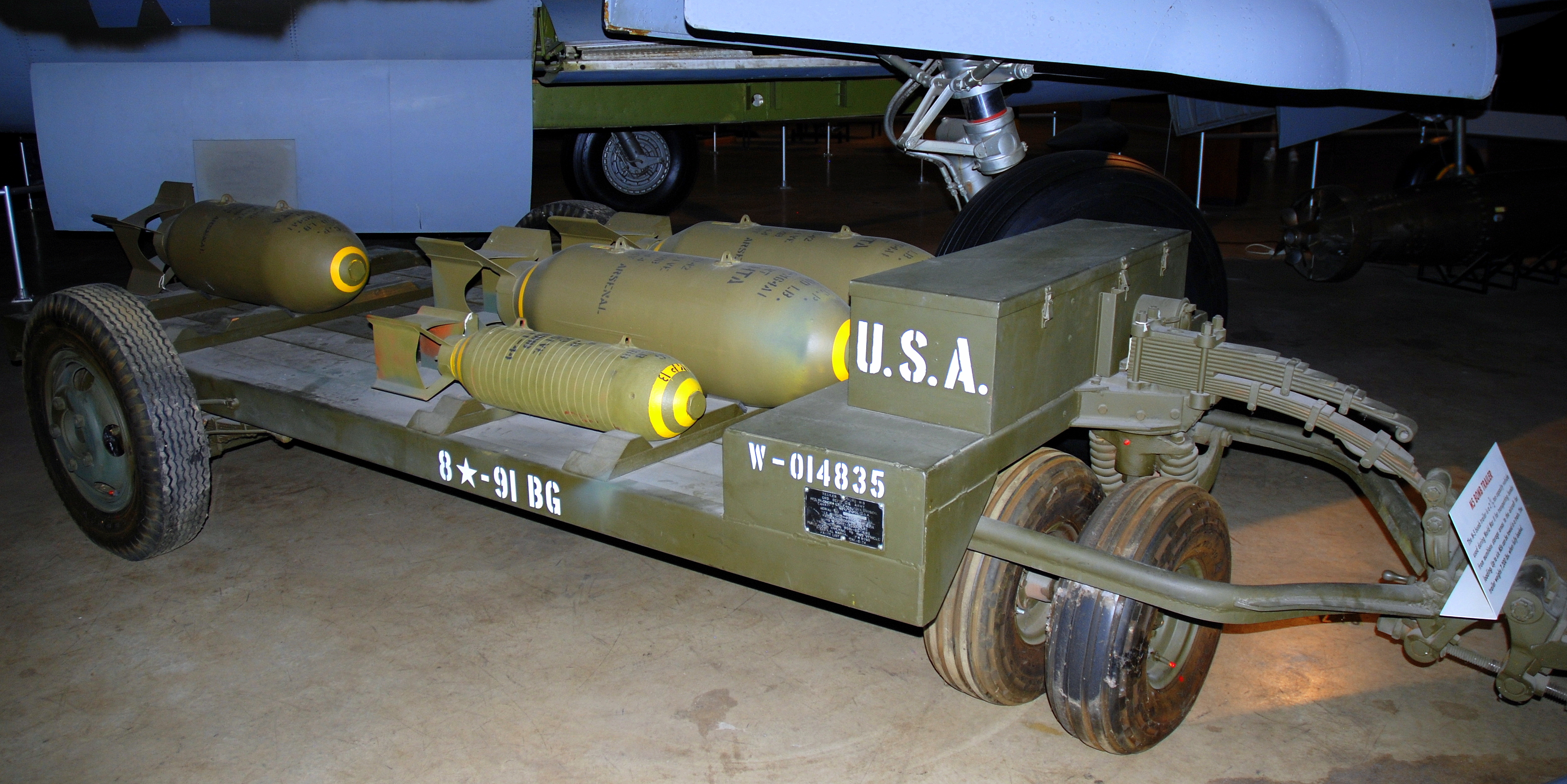
M5 bomb trailer at the National Museum of the USAF, in Dayton Ohio

There are six known examples in museums, two of which have been restored (one at the Imperial War Museum Duxford, UK and one at the National Museum of the United States Air Force in Dayton, Ohio). Three more are undergoing restoration, one at the Carolinas Aviation Museum in Charlotte, North Carolina, one at Planes of Fame Air Museum in Chino, California, and one at the Yankee Air Museum. The three are in need of a complete overhaul. The Collings Foundation (Stow MA USA) also has three unrestored M5's. Others are in private Historic Military Vehicle (HMV) collectors hands around the US and the world.

- Carolinas Aviation Museum
- Imperial War Museum Duxford
- National Museum of the United States Air Force
- Yankee Air Museum
- Flyhistorisk Museum, Sola, Norway. Restored in USN Glossy Sea Blue color. Temporary stored.

== See also ==
- M-numbers
- G-numbers (G74)
