= Ursynów M-6 =

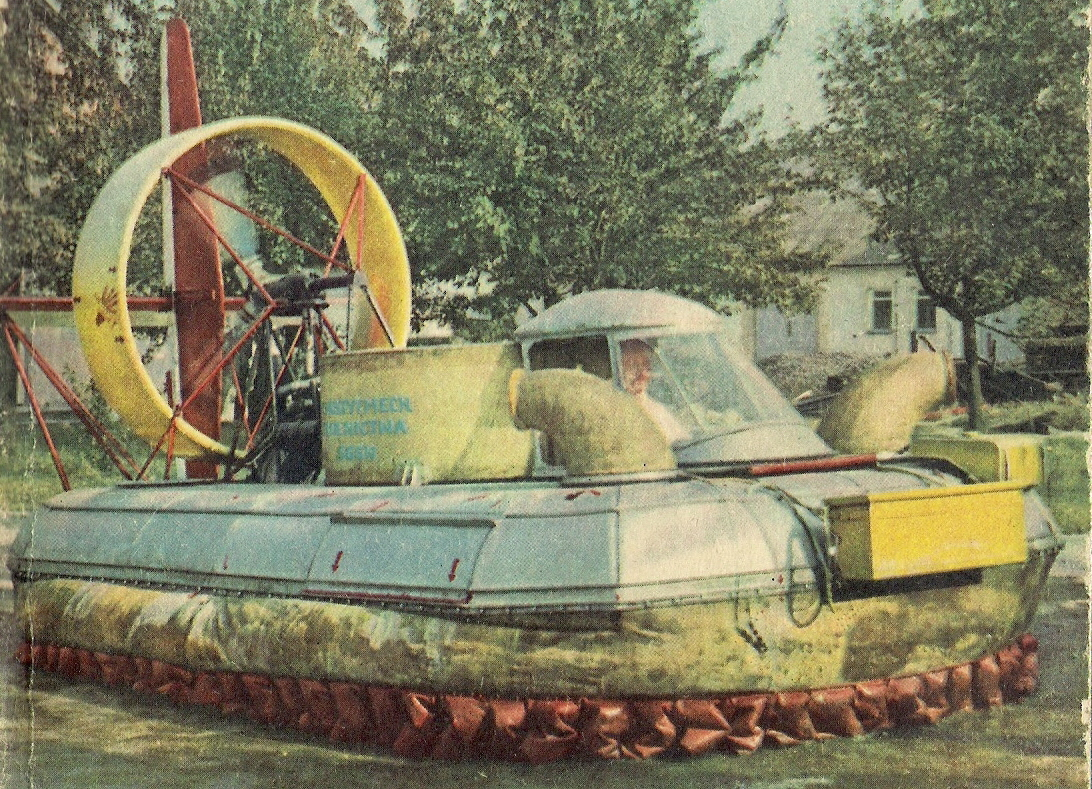
- Ursynów M-6 in 1971.

Class overview
- Name: Ursynów M-6
- Builders: Warsaw University of Life Sciences
- Built: 1967–1971
- In service: N/A
- Completed: 1 (prototype)
- Active: 0
- Preserved: 0

General characteristics
- Type: Hovercraft
- Installed power: 45 HP
- Propulsion: 1 centrifugal fan powered by a Wartburg engine
- Crew: 1

Ursynów M-6 (Polish: [urˈsɘ̟n.uf ˈɛm ˈʂɛɕt͡ɕ]) was a prototype hovercraft designed for agricultural purposes between 1967 and 1971 at the Warsaw University of Life Sciences in Poland. The project was cancelled following numerous issues noted during its testing.

== History ==
In the 1960s, at Warsaw University of Life Sciences, as part of project to develop a hovercraft for farming exploitation, the team led by professor Nowacki, and with engineer Andrzej Moldenhawer, begun designing concepts for the Ursynów M-6. Its specifications and functional model were then made by a team at the Warsaw Institute of Aviation, and later with further development and constructed at the university. Its tests begun in 1971. The machine was noted to have numerous issues, including bad steering, low speed, and blowing large quantities of dust in the air. The project was abandoned, and the only constructed unit was lost, with its further history unknown.

== Specifications ==
The Ursynów M-6 hovercraft was propelled by prototype centrifugal fan made out of Epoxy enforced with glass fiber. The fan weighted 50 kg, with a diametre of 1.3 m. The vehicle was powered by a 45 horse power Wartburg engine with gear train with ratio of 1:4.
