= Canon EOS M2 =

2013 APS-C mirrorless camera

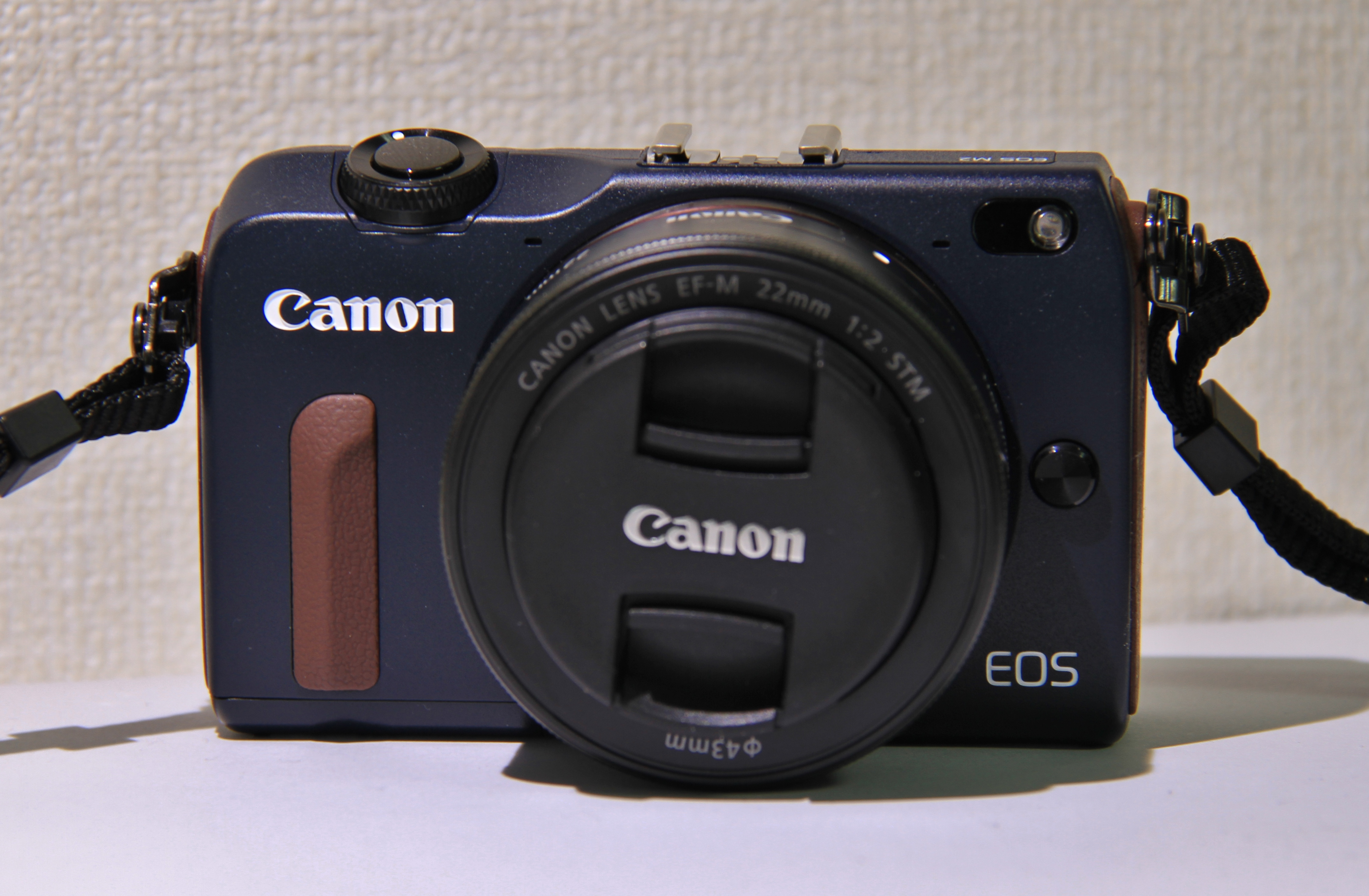

Overview
- Maker: Canon
- Type: Mirrorless interchangeable lens camera

Lens
- Lens mount: Canon EF-M
- Lens: Interchangeable

Sensor/medium
- Sensor type: CMOS II
- Sensor size: APS-C (22.3 × 14.9 mm)
- Maximum resolution: 18 megapixels
- Recording medium: SD, SDHC, SDXC

Shutter
- Shutter: Electronically-controlled vertical-travel focal-plane shutter
- Shutter speeds: 30 s to 1/4000 s and bulb
- Continuous shooting: 3.4 frame/s
- Image processor: DIGIC 5

General
- LCD screen: 3 in, 1,040,000 dots
- Battery: LP-E12
- Dimensions: 108.6×66.5×32.3 mm (4.28×2.62×1.27 in)
- Weight: 274 g (9.7 oz) (with battery)

Chronology
- Predecessor: Canon EOS M
- Successor: Canon EOS M3; Canon EOS M10

The Canon EOS M2 is the second mirrorless camera produced by Canon. It was replaced by the Canon EOS M3 and Canon EOS M10 in 2015.

== Design ==
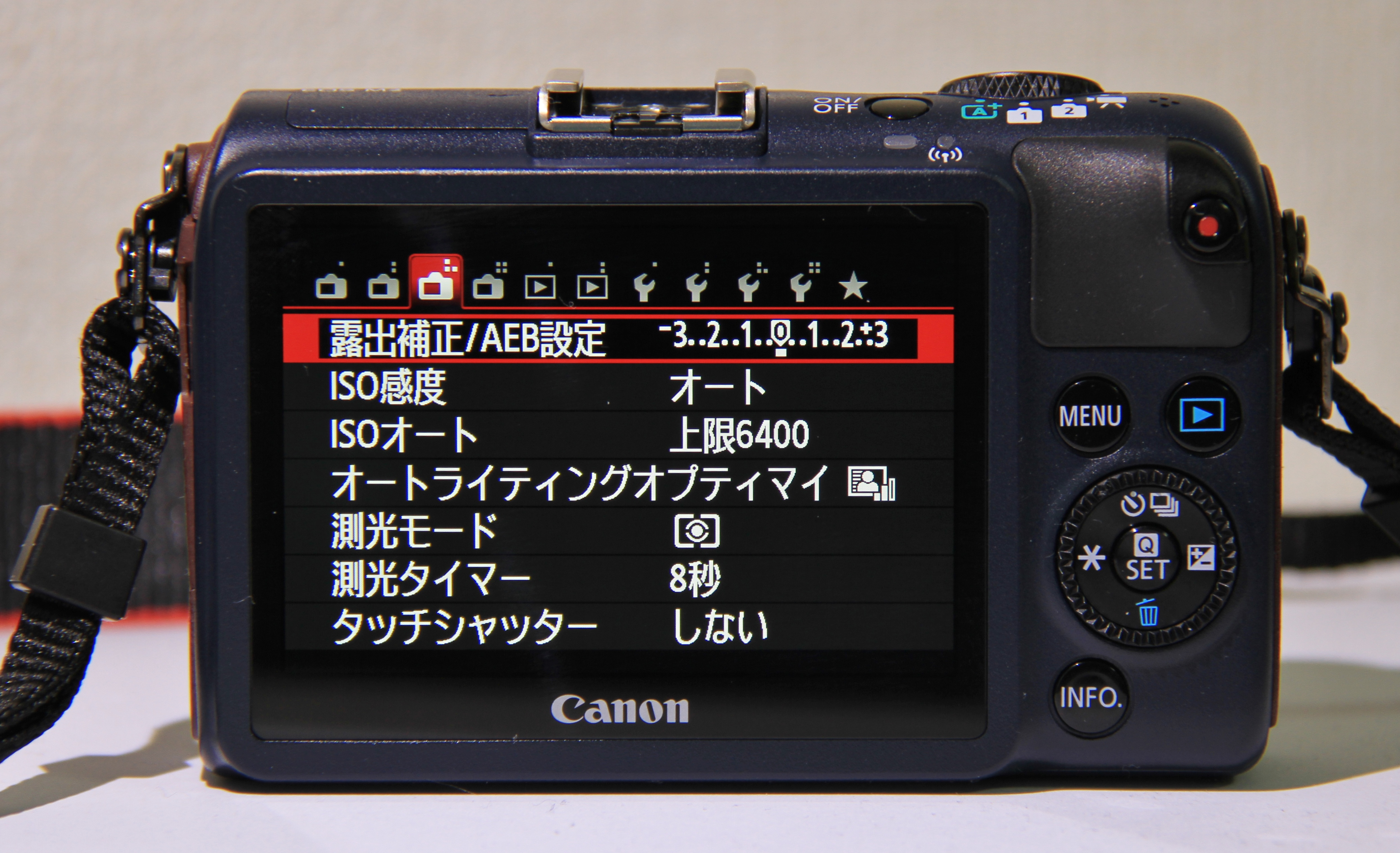
EOS M2 Japanese menu

Similar to its predecessor, the Canon EOS M, the EOS M2 uses the Canon EF-M lens mount, an 18 megapixel APS-C sensor and a DIGIC 5 image processor. The newer EOS M2 adds phase detection autofocus for improved autofocus speed, plus integrated Wi-Fi with support for wireless image transfer and remote control via a smartphone app. The camera has a 3-inch touchscreen with support for multi-touch gestures such as pinch to zoom, swiping and tapping.

The camera does not include a built-in flash or electronic viewfinder, but does support external Canon Speedlite external flashes via a hot shoe. The EOS M2 was offered in certain markets as a kit including a Speedlite 90 EX flash. The camera can also accept Canon EF and EF-S lenses with an additional mount adapter. The camera is capable of supporting Standard Definition video at 30 fps or 25 fps, 720p HD video at 60 fps or 50 fps, and 1080p Full HD video at 30 fps, 24 fps or 25 fps.

== Sales ==
The EOS M2 was announced in Japan in December 2013 with a suggested retail price of ¥64800 for the body only, or ¥84800 for a kit including the EF-M 18-55mm f/3.5-5.6 IS STM lens and Speedlite 90 EX flash.

Canon confirmed at the camera's launch that it had no plans to market the camera in Europe or North America.

== See also ==
- List of smallest mirrorless cameras

Sensor	Class	12	13	14	15	16	17	18	19	20	21	22	23	24	25
Full-frame	Flagship														R1 ^{ATS}
Full-frame	Professional											R3 ^{ATS}			
Full-frame	Professional										R5 ^{ATSR}				R5 Mk II ^{ATSR}
Full-frame	Professional											R5 C ^{ATCR}			
Full-frame	Advanced										R6 ^{ATS}		R6 Mk II ^{ATS}		
Full-frame	Advanced									Ra ^{AT}					
Full-frame	Advanced								R ^{AT}						
Full-frame	Midrange													R8 ^{AT}	
Full-frame	Entry/mid								RP ^{AT}						
APS-C	Advanced												R7 ^{ATS}		
APS-C	Midrange						M5 ^{FT}						R10 ^{AT}		
APS-C	Entry/mid		_{x} M ^{T}	M2 ^{T}	M3 ^{FT}			M6 ^{FT}		M6 Mk II ^{FT}					
APS-C	Entry/mid								M50 ^{AT}		M50 Mk II ^{AT}			R50 ^{AT}	
APS-C	Entry/mid														R50 V ^{AT}
APS-C	Entry					M10 ^{FT}		M100 ^{FT}		M200 ^{FT}				R100	
Sensor	Class														
Sensor	Class	12	13	14	15	16	17	18	19	20	21	22	23	24	25
