= Canon EOS M6 Mark II =

2019 APS-C mirrorless camera

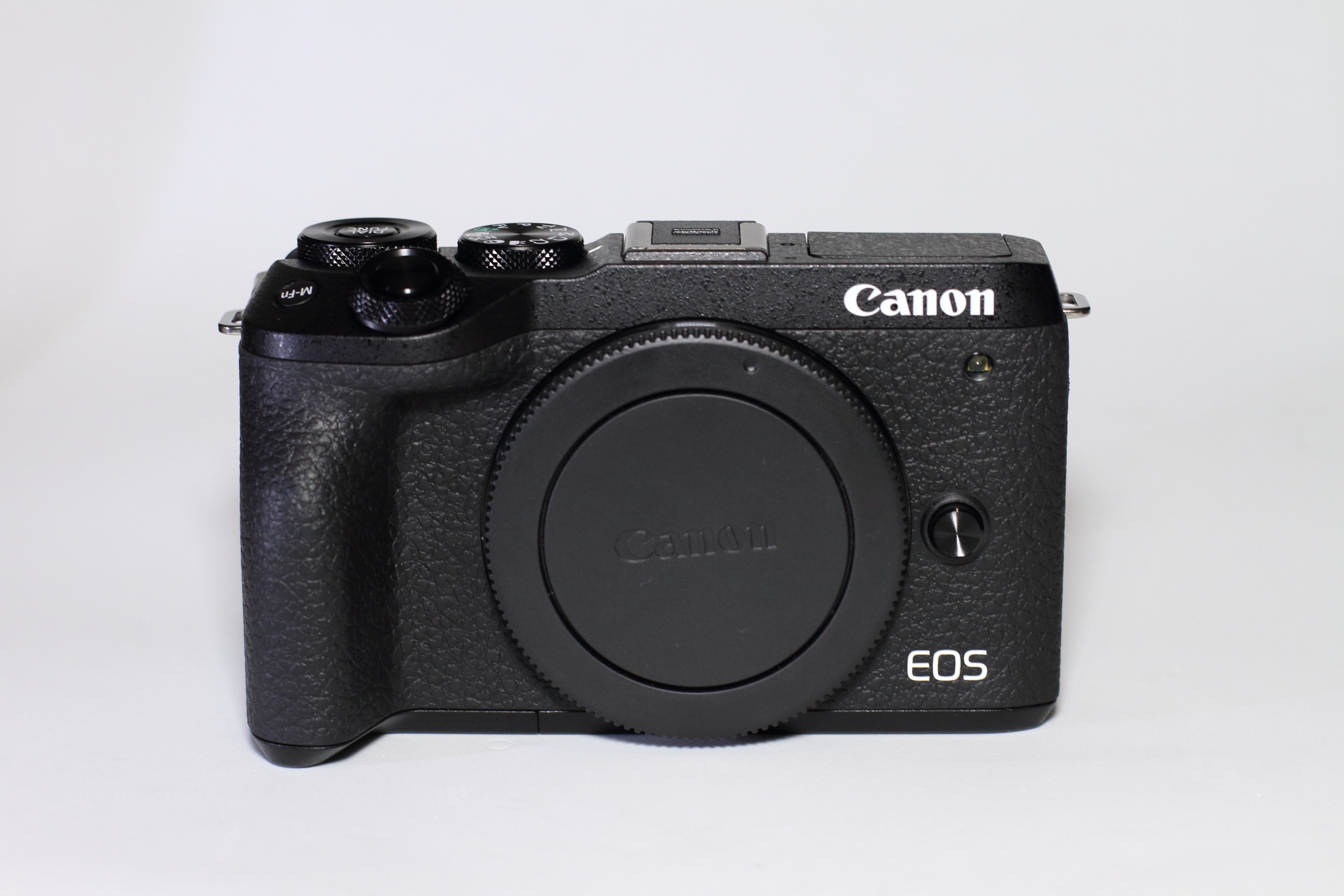

Overview
- Maker: Canon Inc.
- Type: Mirrorless
- Intro price: US$849.99

Lens
- Lens mount: Canon EF-M
- Lens: Interchangeable

Sensor/medium
- Sensor: dual-pixel CMOS sensor
- Sensor size: APS-C (22.3 × 14.9 mm)
- Maximum resolution: 32.5 MP
- Film speed: ISO 100–25600; high 51200
- Recording medium: SDXC (UHS-II capable)

Focusing
- Focus: Dual Pixel CMOS autofocus

Flash
- Flash: Yes

Shutter
- Frame rate: 14 fps with autofocus
- Shutter speeds: 30 s to 1/4000 s; electronic 1/16000 s

Image processing
- Image processor: DIGIC 8

General
- Video recording: 4K (29.97 fps) 1080p (119.88 fps)
- LCD screen: 3.0 in (7.6 cm) 1.04-million-dot LCD
- Battery: LP-E17
- Data port(s): Wi-Fi, Bluetooth
- Dimensions: 4.71×2.76×1.94 in (120×70×49 mm)
- Weight: 14.39 oz (408 g)

Chronology
- Predecessor: Canon EOS M6

The Canon EOS M6 Mark II is a digital mirrorless interchangeable-lens camera announced by Canon on August 28, 2019, and released in September 2019. As with all of the Canon EOS M series cameras, the Canon EOS M6 Mark II uses the Canon EF-M lens mount. The M6 Mark II is the successor of both the M5 (2016) and the M6 (2017).

The characteristic basic features are the same as with the M6: the camera lacks a built-in viewfinder. Users can purchase an additional electronic viewfinder (Canon EVF-DC1 or -DC2) which costs 200 euros or more; it is included in some bundles with body and kit lens. The camera has a tilt screen. It can be articulated upwards, so that the user can see themselves in the screen. For sound, the camera has dual microphones equating to stereo audio recording but it also has a 3.5 mm microphone connection for external microphones, but no headphone port.

The Canon EOS M6 Mark II can record video with 4K up to 29.97 fps and 1080p at up to 119.88 fps but in this mode the camera's dual-pixel auto-focus is unavailable. When released, the camera could not record 24 (23.97) fps 4K video; this was added in a firmware update. Older production cameras can be updated with a free download from Canon's website.

== Key features ==
- Canon EF-M lens mount
- 32.5 megapixel dual-pixel, APS-C, CMOS sensor
- Video can be recorded with 4K at 29.97 fps, 1080p up to 119.88.
- ISO 100 – 25600 (extended to 51200)
- Dual Pixel CMOS autofocus
- 1.04M-dot tilting rear articulating touchscreen
- Microphone input (3.5 mm)
- Intervalometer port (2.5 mm)
- USB-C Data Transfer port

== See also ==
other Canon APS-C cameras with sensors higher than 24 megapixels:

- Canon EOS R7
- Canon EOS 90D

Sensor	Class	12	13	14	15	16	17	18	19	20	21	22	23	24	25	26
Full-frame	Flagship														_{m} R1 ^{ATS}	
Full-frame	Professional											_{m} R3 ^{ATS}				
Full-frame	Professional										R5 ^{ATSR}				_{m} R5 Mk II ^{ATSR}	
Full-frame	Professional											_{m} R5 C ^{ATCR}				
Full-frame	Advanced										R6 ^{ATS}		_{m} R6 Mk II ^{ATS}			_{m} R6 Mk III ^{ATS}
Full-frame	Advanced									Ra ^{AT}						
Full-frame	Advanced								R ^{AT}							
Full-frame	Midrange													_{m} R8 ^{AT}		
Full-frame	Entry/mid								RP ^{AT}							
APS-C	Advanced												_{m} R7 ^{ATS}			
APS-C	Midrange						M5 ^{FT}						_{m} R10 ^{AT}			
APS-C	Entry/mid		_{x} M ^{T}	M2 ^{T}	M3 ^{FT}			M6 ^{FT}		M6 Mk II ^{FT}						
APS-C	Entry/mid								M50 ^{AT}		M50 Mk II ^{AT}			_{m} R50 ^{AT}		
APS-C	Entry/mid															_{m} R50 V ^{AT}
APS-C	Entry					M10 ^{FT}		M100 ^{FT}		M200 ^{FT}				R100		
Sensor	Class															
Sensor	Class	12	13	14	15	16	17	18	19	20	21	22	23	24	25	26
