= Canon EOS M100 =

2017 APS-C mirrorless camera

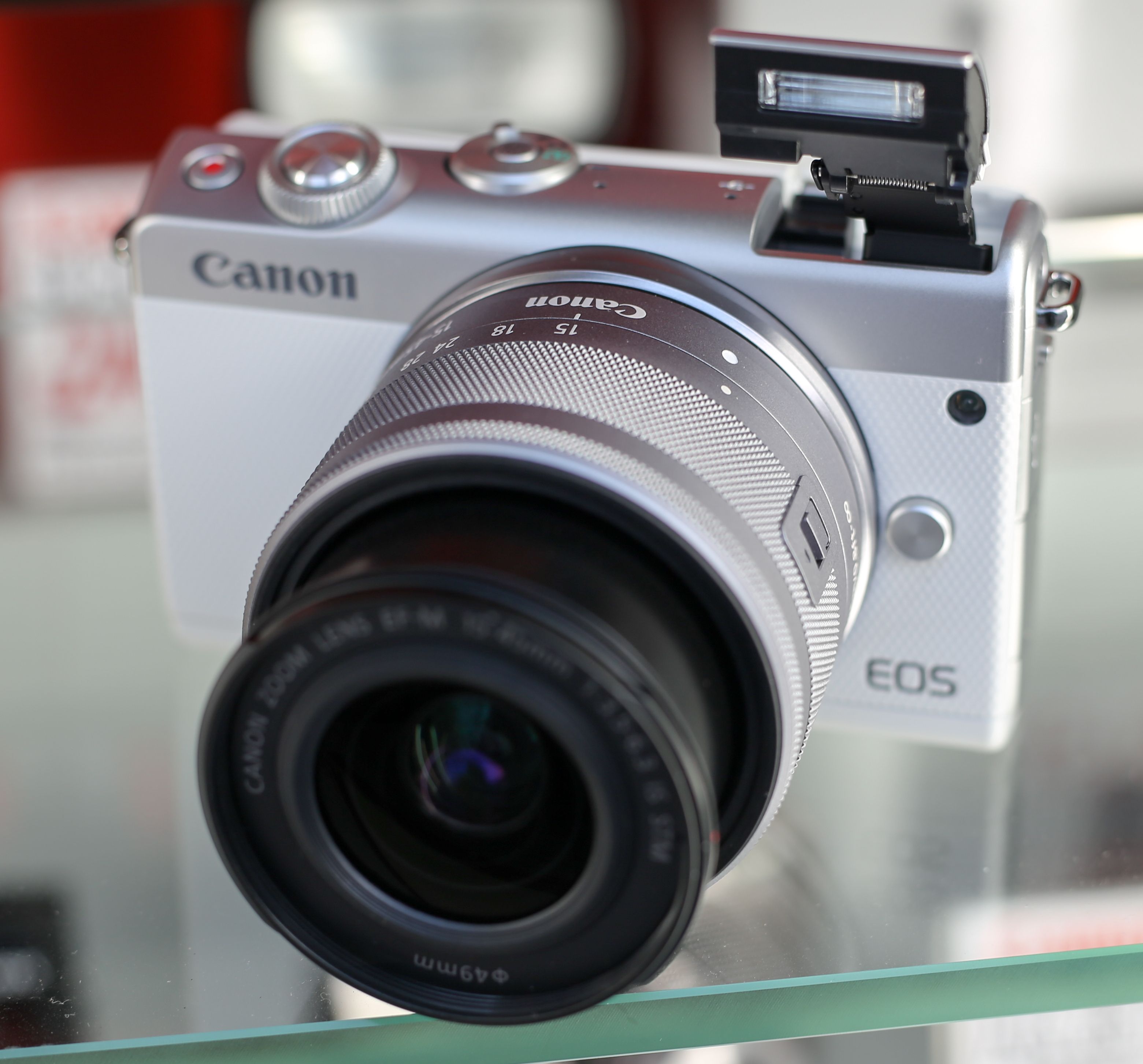

Overview
- Maker: Canon Inc.
- Type: Mirrorless interchangeable lens camera

Lens
- Lens mount: Canon EF-M
- Lens: Interchangeable

Sensor/medium
- Sensor type: CMOS
- Sensor size: APS-C (22.3 × 14.9 mm)
- Maximum resolution: 6000 × 4000 (24 megapixels)
- Recording medium: SD, SDHC or SDXC memory card

Focusing
- Focus areas: 49 focus points

Shutter
- Shutter speeds: 1/4000 s to 30 s
- Continuous shooting: without autofocus 89 frames with 6.1 fps, with autofocus 1000 frames with 4 fps

Image processing
- Image processor: DIGIC 7
- White balance: Yes

General
- Video recording: 1080p (60, 30 and 24 fps)
- LCD screen: 3" with 1,040,000 dots
- Battery: LP-E12
- Data port(s): Wi-Fi, NFC, Bluetooth
- Dimensions: 108.2 mm × 67.1 mm × 35.1 mm (4.26 in × 2.64 in × 1.38 in)
- Weight: 302 g (11 oz) (0.666 lb) including battery

Chronology
- Predecessor: Canon EOS M10
- Successor: Canon EOS M200

The Canon EOS M100 is a digital mirrorless interchangeable-lens camera first announced by Canon Inc. on August 29, 2017. Canon EOS M100 incorporates the proprietary image processor that allows the camera to capture still images up to 6.1 fps using the fixed focus and 4 fps burst mode. The EOS M100 can be connected to all EF, EF-S and TS-E lenses with an available adapter.

== Design ==
The EOS M100 is an interchangeable lens camera that uses the Canon EF-M lens mount. The EOS M100 is an entry-level model which lacks the large rubber grip, multiple control dials, and hot shoe flash that can be found on the larger and more expensive Canon EOS M6. The EOS M100 uses the same 24.2 MP APS-C sensor as the Canon EOS M6. The EOS M100 also uses the Dual Pixel CMOS autofocus system. However, unlike the EOS M10, the EOS M100 features the same DIGIC 7 image processor as the newer Canon EOS M6. The camera supports uncompressed 1080p video. The camera has in-camera RAW conversion feature pre-loaded on it which is a handy option to convert images.

== Sales ==
In its initial press release announcing the camera, Canon revealed that the camera would be sold in a kit including the EOS M100 and an EF-M 15-45mm f/3.5-6.3 IS STM zoom lens at a retail price of $599.99.

== See also ==
- List of smallest mirrorless cameras

Sensor	Class	12	13	14	15	16	17	18	19	20	21	22	23	24	25
Full-frame	Flagship														R1 ^{ATS}
Full-frame	Professional											R3 ^{ATS}			
Full-frame	Professional										R5 ^{ATSR}				R5 Mk II ^{ATSR}
Full-frame	Professional											R5 C ^{ATCR}			
Full-frame	Advanced										R6 ^{ATS}		R6 Mk II ^{ATS}		
Full-frame	Advanced									Ra ^{AT}					
Full-frame	Advanced								R ^{AT}						
Full-frame	Midrange													R8 ^{AT}	
Full-frame	Entry/mid								RP ^{AT}						
APS-C	Advanced												R7 ^{ATS}		
APS-C	Midrange						M5 ^{FT}						R10 ^{AT}		
APS-C	Entry/mid		_{x} M ^{T}	M2 ^{T}	M3 ^{FT}			M6 ^{FT}		M6 Mk II ^{FT}					
APS-C	Entry/mid								M50 ^{AT}		M50 Mk II ^{AT}			R50 ^{AT}	
APS-C	Entry/mid														R50 V ^{AT}
APS-C	Entry					M10 ^{FT}		M100 ^{FT}		M200 ^{FT}				R100	
Sensor	Class														
Sensor	Class	12	13	14	15	16	17	18	19	20	21	22	23	24	25
