= Canon EOS M10 =

2015 APS-C mirrorless camera

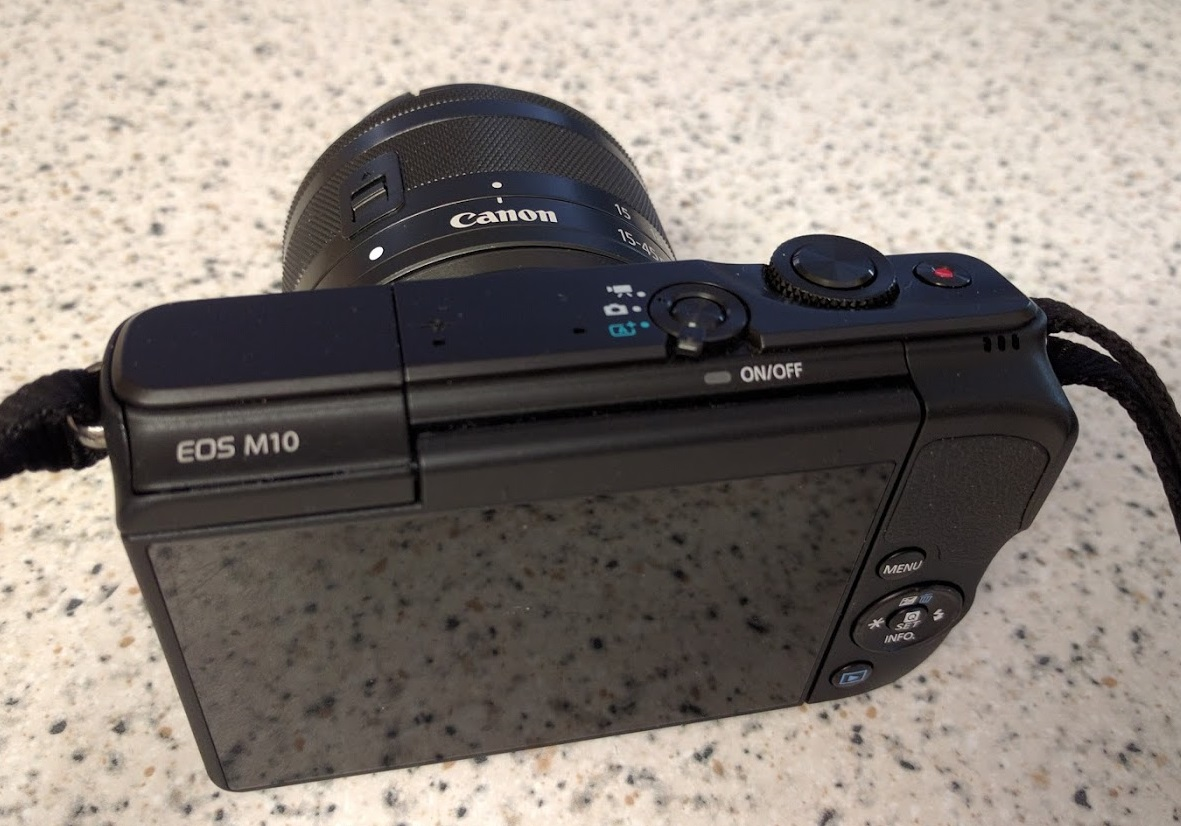

Overview
- Maker: Canon Inc.
- Type: Mirrorless interchangeable lens camera

Lens
- Lens mount: Canon EF-M
- Lens: Interchangeable

Sensor/medium
- Sensor type: CMOS
- Sensor size: APS-C (22.3 × 14.9 mm)
- Maximum resolution: 5184 × 3456 (18 megapixels)
- Recording medium: SD, SDHC or SDXC memory card

Focusing
- Focus areas: 49 focus points

Shutter
- Shutter speeds: 1/4000s to 30s
- Continuous shooting: 4.6 frames per second

Image processing
- Image processor: DIGIC 6
- White balance: Yes

General
- LCD screen: 3 " with 1,040,000 dots
- Battery: LP-E12
- Dimensions: 108 mm × 67 mm × 35 mm (4.25 in × 2.64 in × 1.38 in)
- Weight: 301 g (11 oz) (0.664 lb) including battery

Chronology
- Predecessor: Canon EOS M2
- Successor: Canon EOS M100

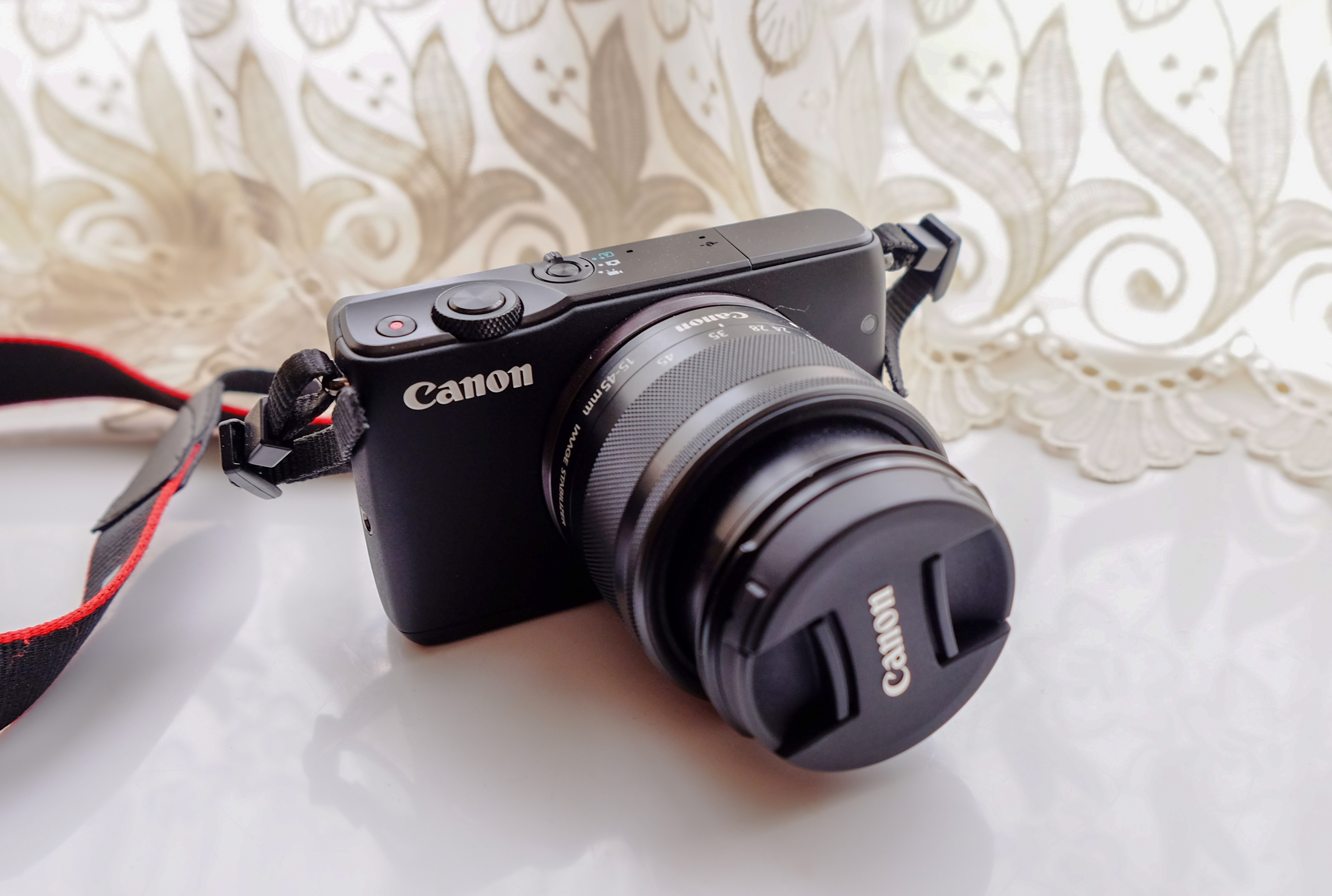
Canon EOS M10 with 15-45 lens

The Canon EOS M10 is a digital mirrorless interchangeable-lens camera first announced by Canon Inc. on October 13, 2015. It was replaced by the Canon EOS M100.

== Design ==
The EOS M10 is an interchangeable lens camera that uses the Canon EF-M lens mount. The EOS M10 is an entry-level model which lacks the large rubber grip, multiple control dials, and hot shoe flash that can be found on the larger and more expensive Canon EOS M3.

The EOS M10 uses the same 18MP APS-C sensor as the older Canon EOS M2, which was not sold in the United States. The EOS M10 also uses the EOS M2's Hybrid CMOS AF II autofocus system, instead of the EOS M3's quicker Hybrid CMOS AF III system. However, unlike the EOS M2, the EOS M10 features the same DIGIC 6 image processor as the newer EOS M3.

The EOS M10 has a 180-degree flip-up LCD viewscreen, a built-in pop-up flash, and integrated Wi-Fi and NFC enabling control of the camera via a smartphone app.

== Sales ==
In its initial press release announcing the camera, Canon revealed that the camera would be sold in a kit including the EOS M10 and an EF-M 15-45mm f/3.5-6.3 IS STM zoom lens at a retail price of $599.99. As of October 2015, the camera is not sold separately and can only be bought in a kit with lens included.

== See also ==
- List of smallest mirrorless cameras

Sensor	Class	12	13	14	15	16	17	18	19	20	21	22	23	24	25
Full-frame	Flagship														R1 ^{ATS}
Full-frame	Professional											R3 ^{ATS}			
Full-frame	Professional										R5 ^{ATSR}				R5 Mk II ^{ATSR}
Full-frame	Professional											R5 C ^{ATCR}			
Full-frame	Advanced										R6 ^{ATS}		R6 Mk II ^{ATS}		
Full-frame	Advanced									Ra ^{AT}					
Full-frame	Advanced								R ^{AT}						
Full-frame	Midrange													R8 ^{AT}	
Full-frame	Entry/mid								RP ^{AT}						
APS-C	Advanced												R7 ^{ATS}		
APS-C	Midrange						M5 ^{FT}						R10 ^{AT}		
APS-C	Entry/mid		_{x} M ^{T}	M2 ^{T}	M3 ^{FT}			M6 ^{FT}		M6 Mk II ^{FT}					
APS-C	Entry/mid								M50 ^{AT}		M50 Mk II ^{AT}			R50 ^{AT}	
APS-C	Entry/mid														R50 V ^{AT}
APS-C	Entry					M10 ^{FT}		M100 ^{FT}		M200 ^{FT}				R100	
Sensor	Class														
Sensor	Class	12	13	14	15	16	17	18	19	20	21	22	23	24	25
