= Canon EOS M3 =

2015 APS-C mirrorless camera

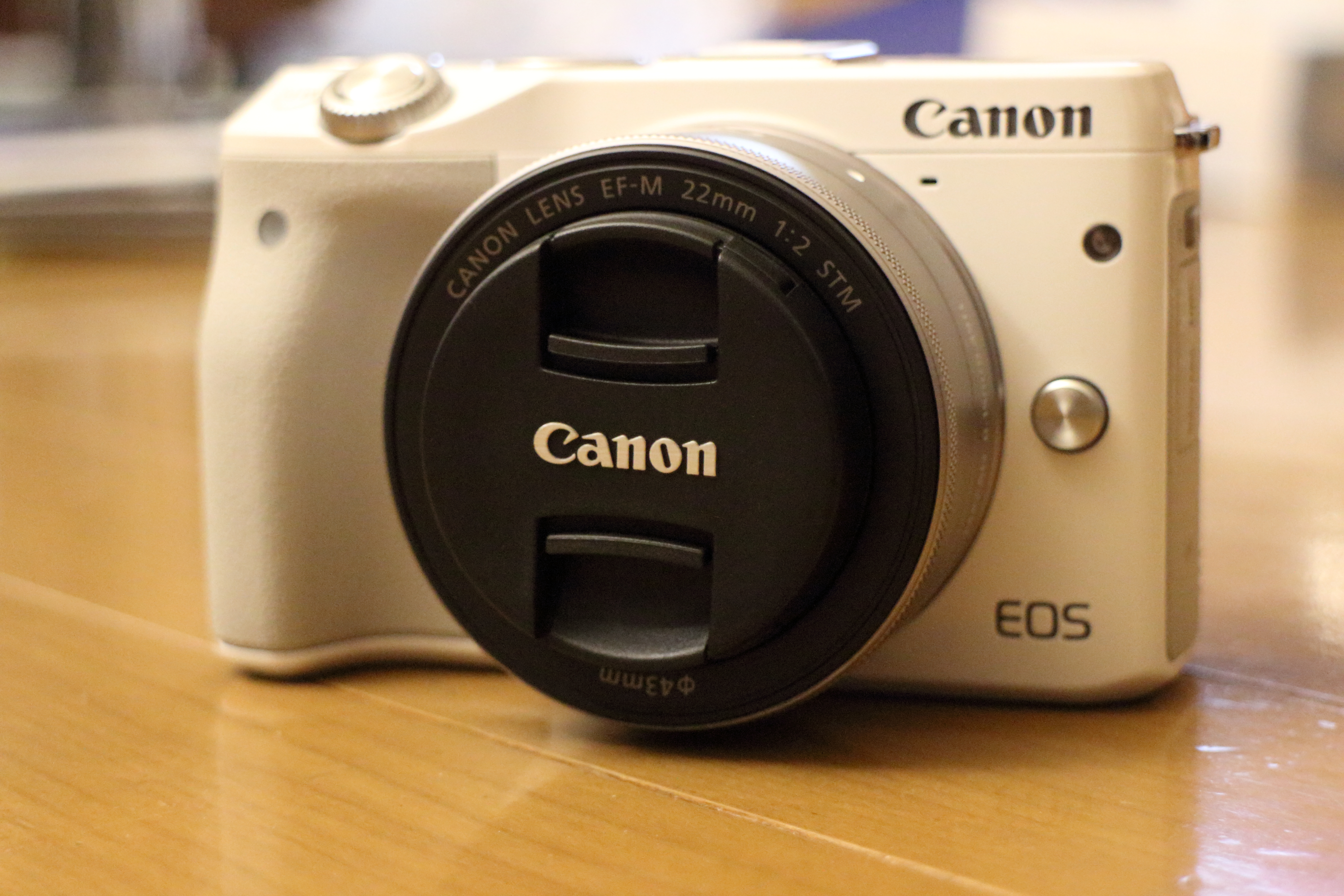

Overview
- Maker: Canon Inc.
- Type: Mirrorless

Lens
- Lens mount: Canon EF-M
- Lens: Interchangeable

Sensor/medium
- Sensor type: CMOS
- Sensor size: APS-C (22.3 × 14.9 mm)
- Maximum resolution: 6000 × 4000 (24 megapixels)
- Recording medium: SD, SDHC or SDXC card

Focusing
- Focus areas: 49 focus points

Flash
- Flash: Yes

Shutter
- Shutter speeds: 1/4000s to 30s
- Continuous shooting: 4.2 frames per second

Viewfinder
- Optional viewfinders: External EVF-DC1

Image processing
- Image processor: DIGIC 6
- White balance: Yes
- WB bracketing: No

General
- LCD screen: 3 " with 1,040,000 dots
- Battery: LP-E17
- Dimensions: 111×68×44 mm (4.4×2.7×1.7 in)
- Weight: 366 g (12.9 oz) (with battery)

Chronology
- Predecessor: Canon EOS M2
- Successor: Canon EOS M6

The Canon EOS M3 is a mirrorless camera announced by Canon on February 6, 2015.

== Design ==
Like its predecessor, the Canon EOS M2, the camera uses the Canon EF-M lens mount. However, the EOS M3 adds a number of new features, including a contoured grip, tilting LCD touchscreen, built-in pop-up flash and dedicated mode dial. Internally, the EOS M3 sports a DIGIC 6 image processor, 24.2 megapixel APS-C sensor, Hybrid CMOS AF III 49-point autofocus system, image stabilisation, and integrated Wi-Fi and NFC enabling control of the camera via a smartphone app.

- ISO 100 – 25600

The camera supports optional accessories including the Canon Speedlite line of external flashes and the EVF-DC1 external electronic viewfinder.

== Sales ==
The EOS M3 became available in Europe and Asia in April 2015. The original EOS M3 announcement indicated that the camera would only be available in Europe and Asia.

On August 27, 2015, Canon announced plans to make the camera available in the United States as of October 2015. At its U.S. launch in October 2015, the EOS M3 was available at $679.99 for the body only, or $799.99 for a kit including the EF-M 18-55mm f/3.5-5.6 IS STM lens.

Sensor	Class	12	13	14	15	16	17	18	19	20	21	22	23	24	25
Full-frame	Flagship														R1 ^{ATS}
Full-frame	Professional											R3 ^{ATS}			
Full-frame	Professional										R5 ^{ATSR}				R5 Mk II ^{ATSR}
Full-frame	Professional											R5 C ^{ATCR}			
Full-frame	Advanced										R6 ^{ATS}		R6 Mk II ^{ATS}		
Full-frame	Advanced									Ra ^{AT}					
Full-frame	Advanced								R ^{AT}						
Full-frame	Midrange													R8 ^{AT}	
Full-frame	Entry/mid								RP ^{AT}						
APS-C	Advanced												R7 ^{ATS}		
APS-C	Midrange						M5 ^{FT}						R10 ^{AT}		
APS-C	Entry/mid		_{x} M ^{T}	M2 ^{T}	M3 ^{FT}			M6 ^{FT}		M6 Mk II ^{FT}					
APS-C	Entry/mid								M50 ^{AT}		M50 Mk II ^{AT}			R50 ^{AT}	
APS-C	Entry/mid														R50 V ^{AT}
APS-C	Entry					M10 ^{FT}		M100 ^{FT}		M200 ^{FT}				R100	
Sensor	Class														
Sensor	Class	12	13	14	15	16	17	18	19	20	21	22	23	24	25
