= Canon EOS M6 =

2017 APS-C mirrorless camera

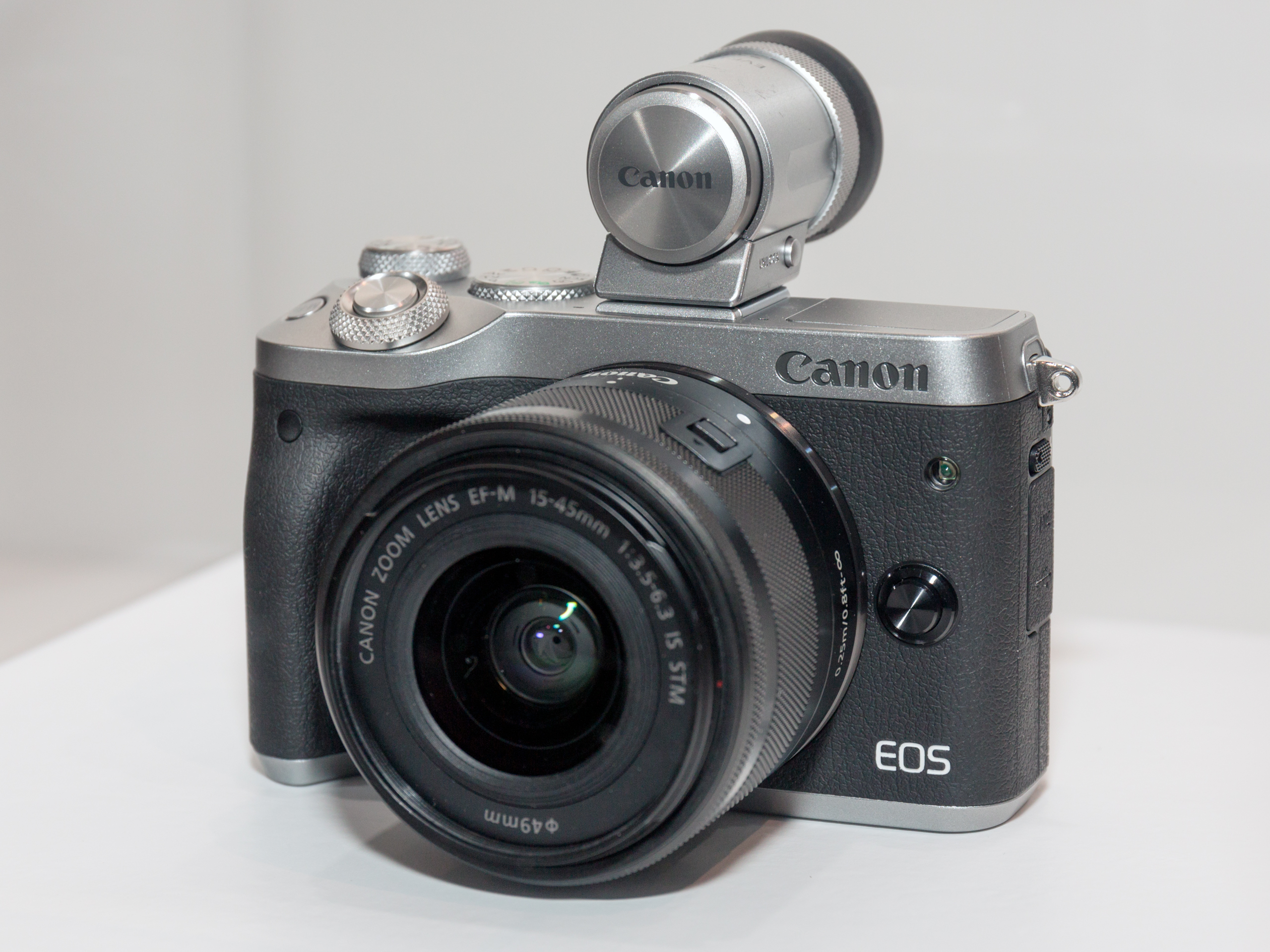

Overview
- Maker: Canon Inc.
- Type: Mirrorless
- Intro price: US$779.99 (body only)

Lens
- Lens mount: Canon EF-M
- Lens: Interchangeable

Sensor/medium
- Sensor type: CMOS
- Sensor size: APS-C (22.3 × 14.9 mm)
- Maximum resolution: 6000×4000 pixels (24 megapixels)
- Film speed: ISO 100–25600
- Recording medium: SDXC (UHS-I capable)

Focusing
- Focus: Dual Pixel CMOS autofocus

Flash
- Flash: Yes

Shutter
- Frame rate: 9 fps; 7 fps with autofocus
- Shutter: Mechanical
- Shutter speed range: 30s – 1/4000s

Image processing
- Image processor: DIGIC 7

General
- Video recording: 1080p (60, 30 and 24 fps)
- LCD screen: 3.0 in (7.6 cm) 1.04-million-dot LCD
- Battery: LP-E17
- Data port(s): Wi-Fi, NFC, Bluetooth
- Dimensions: 4.4×2.7×1.8 in (112×69×46 mm) (11.2 * 6.9 * 4.6 cm)
- Weight: 343 g (12.1 oz)

Chronology
- Predecessor: Canon EOS M3
- Successor: Canon EOS M6 Mark II

The Canon EOS M6 is a digital mirrorless interchangeable-lens camera announced by Canon on February 14, 2017, and released in April 2017. As with all of the Canon EOS M series cameras, the M6 uses the Canon EF-M lens mount.

The camera's screen can be articulated upwards, so that vloggers can see themselves in the screen. The camera lacks a built-in viewfinder which makes it considerably cheaper than the M5; an additional viewfinder for ca. 200 euro can be mounted on the camera via the flash shoe.

For sound, the camera has a 3.5 mm microphone connection, but no headphone port.

The camera is one of the few EOS cameras which do not support Remote Live View shooting through the Canon EOS Utility software.

A new model was introduced in September 2019, the Canon EOS M6 Mark II. It is significantly larger and features a number of improvements, such as a better autofocus or full Remote Live View shooting. It is considered to be the successor of both the M5 and the M6.

== Key features ==
- Canon EF-M lens mount
- 24.2 megapixel dual-pixel, APS-C, CMOS sensor
- Fastest AF focusing speed of 0.03 seconds
- ISO 100 – 25600
- Dual Pixel CMOS autofocus
- 1.04M-dot tilting rear articulating touchscreen

Sensor	Class	12	13	14	15	16	17	18	19	20	21	22	23	24	25	26
Full-frame	Flagship														_{m} R1 ^{ATS}	
Full-frame	Professional											_{m} R3 ^{ATS}				
Full-frame	Professional										R5 ^{ATSR}				_{m} R5 Mk II ^{ATSR}	
Full-frame	Professional											_{m} R5 C ^{ATCR}				
Full-frame	Advanced										R6 ^{ATS}		_{m} R6 Mk II ^{ATS}			_{m} R6 Mk III ^{ATS}
Full-frame	Advanced															R6 V ^{ATS}
Full-frame	Advanced									Ra ^{AT}						
Full-frame	Advanced								R ^{AT}							
Full-frame	Midrange													_{m} R8 ^{AT}		
Full-frame	Entry/mid								RP ^{AT}							
APS-C	Advanced												_{m} R7 ^{ATS}			
APS-C	Midrange						M5 ^{FT}						_{m} R10 ^{AT}			
APS-C	Entry/mid		_{x} M ^{T}	M2 ^{T}	M3 ^{FT}			M6 ^{FT}		M6 Mk II ^{FT}						
APS-C	Entry/mid								M50 ^{AT}		M50 Mk II ^{AT}			_{m} R50 ^{AT}		
APS-C	Entry/mid															_{m} R50 V ^{AT}
APS-C	Entry					M10 ^{FT}		M100 ^{FT}		M200 ^{FT}				R100		
Sensor	Class															
Sensor	Class	12	13	14	15	16	17	18	19	20	21	22	23	24	25	26
