= Canon EF-M lens mount =

Derivative of the Canon EF lens mount

Canon EF-M mount
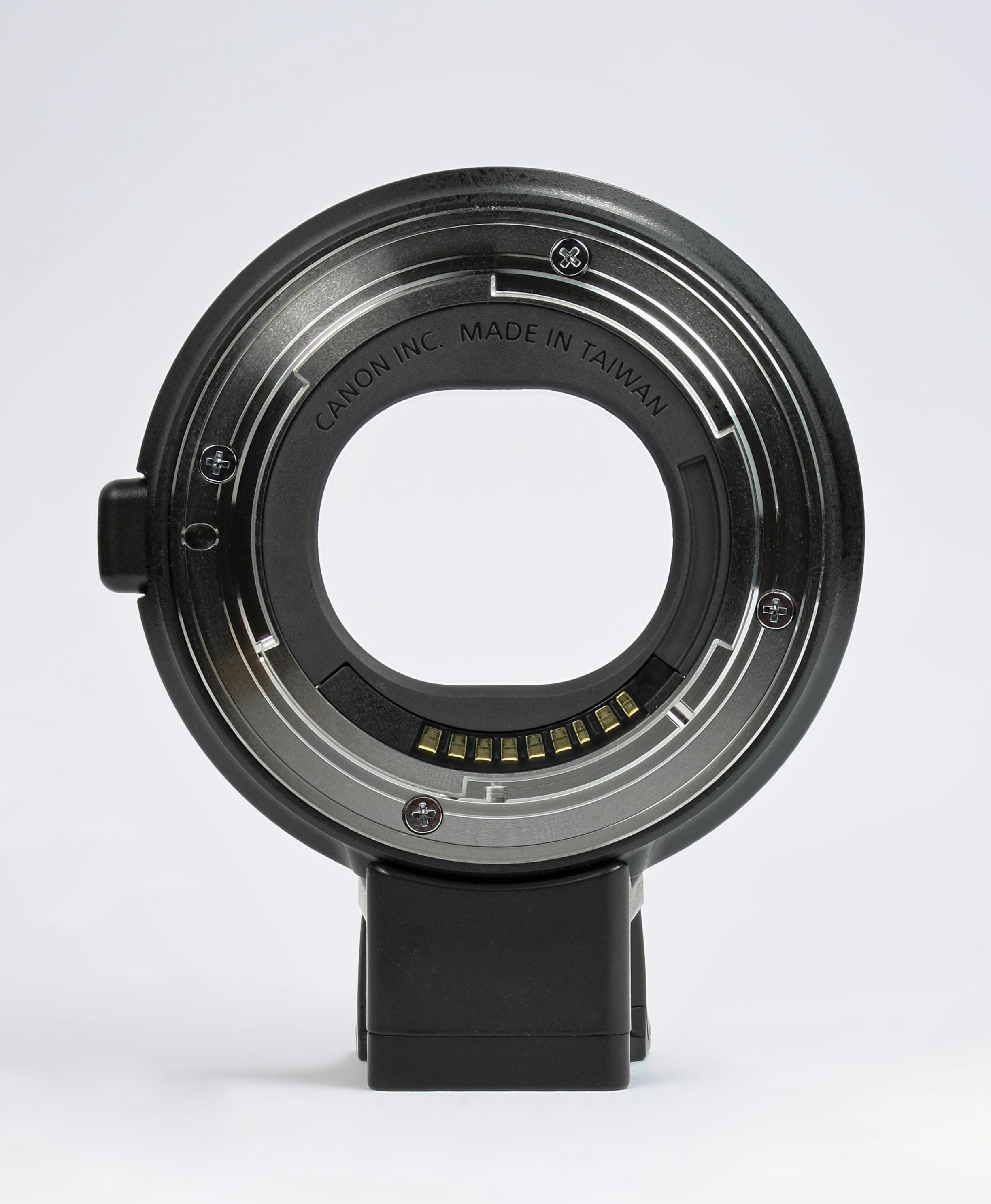
- EF-M lens mount of a Canon EF/EF-S to EF-M adapter mount
- Type: Bayonet
- External diameter: 58 mm
- Inner diameter: 47 mm
- Flange: 18 mm
- Connectors: 9 electrical pins
- Introduced: September 2012
- Discontinued: October 2023

The Canon EF-M lens mount, introduced in 2012, is a derivative of the Canon EF lens mount designed for use with the Canon EOS M mirrorless interchangeable-lens camera. The EF-M lens mount was one of Canon's two systems for mirrorless cameras, the other being the RF mount.

The M system has an 18 mm flange focal distance (compared to 20 mm for RF and 44 mm for EF and EF-S) and a 47 mm throat diameter (compared to 54 mm for EF, EF-S, and RF). As it is designed for use with an APS-C-sized image sensor, it features the same crop factor (of roughly 1.6) as the existing EF-S lens mount.

The EOS EF-M system was officially discontinued in October 2023. Canon had not released any new cameras or lenses for a number of years prior to the discontinuation.

The M system is somewhat limited as Canon only released eight native lenses, listed below. There was a lack of native lenses with a large aperture, the exceptions being 22 mm f/2.0 and 32 mm f/1.4. In 2014, third party manufacturers started to present their M lenses. In addition, it is possible to use Canon EF and EF-S lenses (made for the Canon DSLRs) with an adapter. This solution reportedly works well also with regard to the autofocus, but it takes away the size advantage of the smaller M system. Suitable adapters (from EF to M or from EF-S to M) are made by Canon as well as third party manufacturers. As is common with mirrorless systems, the adapter solution is not backwards-compatible with Canon's DSLR cameras: this means that you cannot put M lenses on a DSLR.

== Compatibility ==
The cameras that can use the EF-M mount are:

Camera	Sensor	Maximum Resolution	Autofocus System	Shutter Speeds	Continuous Shooting	Date Introduced	Weight
EOS M	22.3 × 14.9 mm CMOS (APS-C type)	18 Mp (5184 × 3456)	Hybrid CMOS AF	30 s to 1/4000 s and bulb	4.3 fps	2012-06	262 g (9.2 oz)
EOS M2	22.3 × 14.9 mm CMOS (APS-C type)	18 Mp (5184 × 3456)	Hybrid CMOS AF	30 s to 1/4000 s and bulb	3.4 fps	2013-12	274 g (9.7 oz) including battery
EOS M3	22.3 × 14.9 mm CMOS (APS-C type)	24 MP (6000 × 4000)	Hybrid CMOS AF III	30 s to 1/4000 s	4.2 fps	2015-02-06	366 g (12.9 oz) including battery
EOS M5	22.3 × 14.9 mm CMOS (APS-C type)	24 MP (6000 × 4000)	Dual-Pixel CMOS AF	30 s to 1/4000 s	9 fps; 7 fps with autofocus	2016-09-15	427 g (15.1 oz)
EOS M6	22.3 × 14.9 mm CMOS (APS-C type)	24 MP (6000 × 4000)	Dual-Pixel CMOS AF	30 s to 1/4000 s	9 fps; 7 fps with autofocus	2017-02-14	390 g (13.8 oz)
EOS M6 Mark II	22.3 × 14.9 mm CMOS (APS-C type)	32 MP (6960 × 4640)	Dual-Pixel CMOS AF	30 s to 1/4000 s; electronic 1/16000 s	14 fps with autofocus	2019-08-28	408 g (14.4 oz)
EOS M10	22.3 × 14.9 mm CMOS (APS-C type)	18 Mp (5184 × 3456)	Hybrid CMOS AF II	30 s to 1/4000 s	4.6 frames per second	2015-10-13	301 g (10.6 oz) including battery
EOS M50	22.3 × 14.9 mm CMOS (APS-C type)	24 MP (6000 × 4000)	Dual-Pixel CMOS AF	30 s to 1/4000 s	10 fps; 7.4 fps with autofocus	2018-03-23	387 g (13.7 oz)
EOS M50 Mark II	22.3 × 14.9 mm CMOS (APS-C type)	24 MP (6000 × 4000)	Dual-Pixel CMOS AF	30 s to 1/4000 s	10 fps; 7.4 fps with autofocus	2020-10-14	387 g (13.7 oz)
EOS M100	22.3 × 14.9 mm CMOS (APS-C type)	24 MP (6000 × 4000)	Dual-Pixel CMOS AF	30 s to 1/4000 s	6.1 fps; 4 fps with autofocus	2017-08-29	302 g (10.7 oz) including battery
EOS M200	22.3 × 14.9 mm CMOS (APS-C type)	24 MP (6000 × 4000)	Dual-Pixel CMOS AF	30 s to 1/4000 s	6.1 fps; 4 fps with autofocus	2019-09-25	299 g (10.6 oz) including battery

== List of EF-M lenses from Canon ==
Focal length	Equivalent focal length (×1.6 crop factor)	Aperture range	Introduced	Macro	USM	STM	IS	L-series	DO	Min focusing distance	Filter size	Lens diameter	Lens length	Weight
11–22 mm	18 – 35 mm	f/4 – 5.6	2013	No	No	Yes	Yes	No	No	0.15m/0.5ft	55 mm	60.9 mm	58.2 mm	220 g
15–45 mm	24 – 72 mm	f/3.5 – 6.3	2015	No	No	Yes	Yes	No	No	0.25m/0.8ft	49 mm	60.9 mm	44.5 mm	130 g
18–55 mm	29 – 88 mm	f/3.5 – 5.6	2012	No	No	Yes	Yes	No	No	0.25m	52 mm	60.9 mm	61.0 mm	210 g
18–150 mm	29 – 240 mm	f/3.5 – 6.3	2016	No	No	Yes	Yes	No	No	0.45m/1.5ft	55 mm	60.9 mm	86.5 mm	300 g
55–200 mm	88 – 320 mm	f/4.5 – 6.3	2014	No	No	Yes	Yes	No	No	1.0m/3.3ft	52 mm	60.9 mm	86.5 mm	260 g
22 mm	35 mm	f/2	2012	No	No	Yes	No	No	No	0.15m/0.49ft	43 mm	60.9 mm	23.7 mm	105 g
28 mm	45 mm	f/3.5	2016	Yes	No	Yes	Yes	No	No	0.097m (1:1), 0.093m (1.2:1)	43 mm	60.9 mm	45.5 mm	130 g
32 mm	51 mm	f/1.4	2018	No	No	Yes	No	No	No	0.23m/0.76ft	43 mm	60.9 mm	56.5 mm	235 g

== List of EF-M lenses from 3rd-party (AF only) ==
Manufacturer	Focal length	Equivalent focal length (×1.6 crop factor)	Aperture range	Introduced	Filter size
Tamron	18 – 200 mm	29 – 320 mm	f/3.5 – 6.3	2014	55 mm
Sigma	16 mm	26 mm	f/1.4	2019	67 mm
Sigma	30 mm	48 mm	f/1.4	2019	52 mm
Sigma	56 mm	90 mm	f/1.4	2019	55 mm
Viltrox	23 mm	37 mm	f/1.4	2020	52 mm
Viltrox	33 mm	53 mm	f/1.4	2020	52 mm
Viltrox	56 mm	90 mm	f/1.4	2020	52 mm

== Images ==
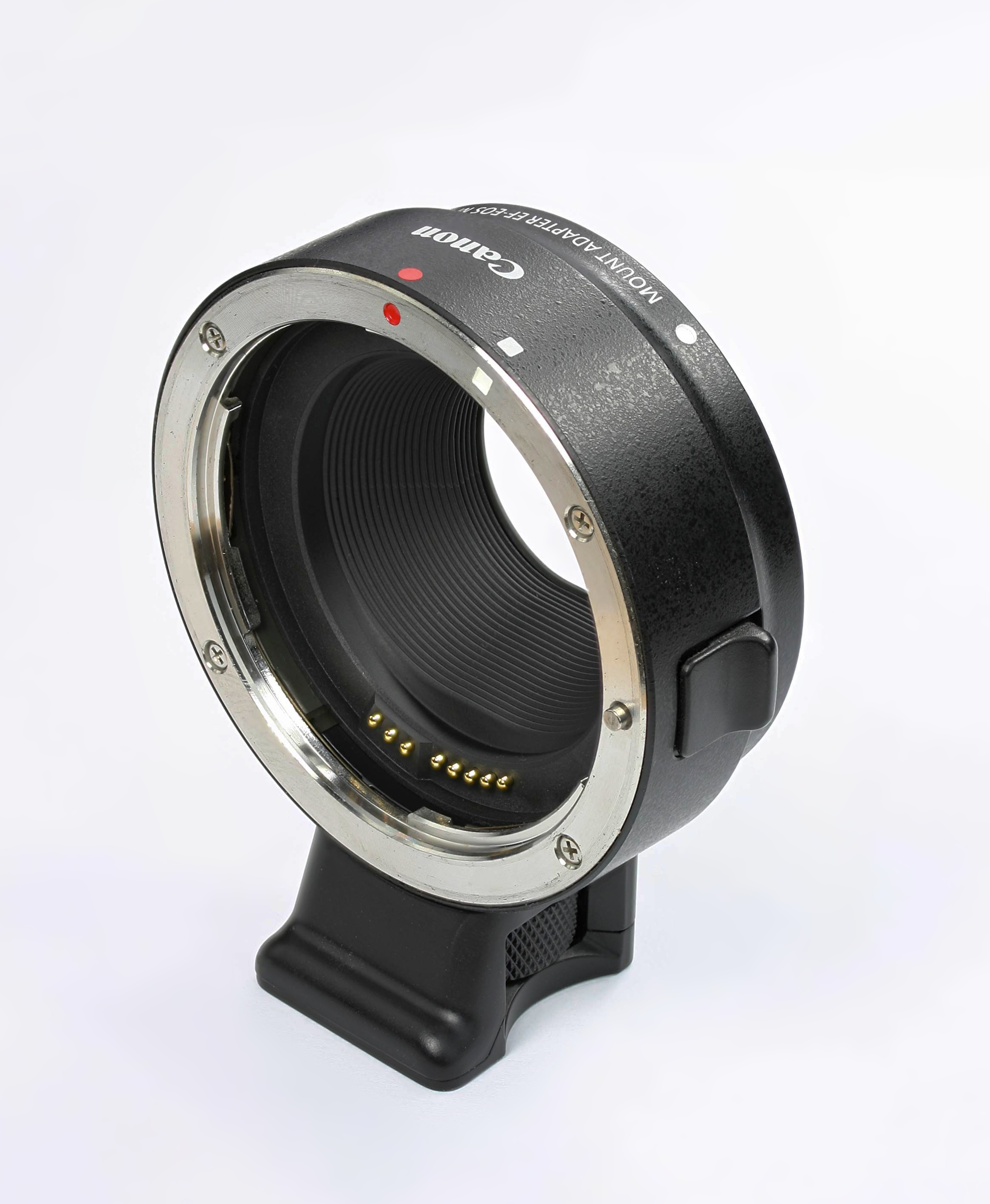
Mount Adapter EF-EOS M

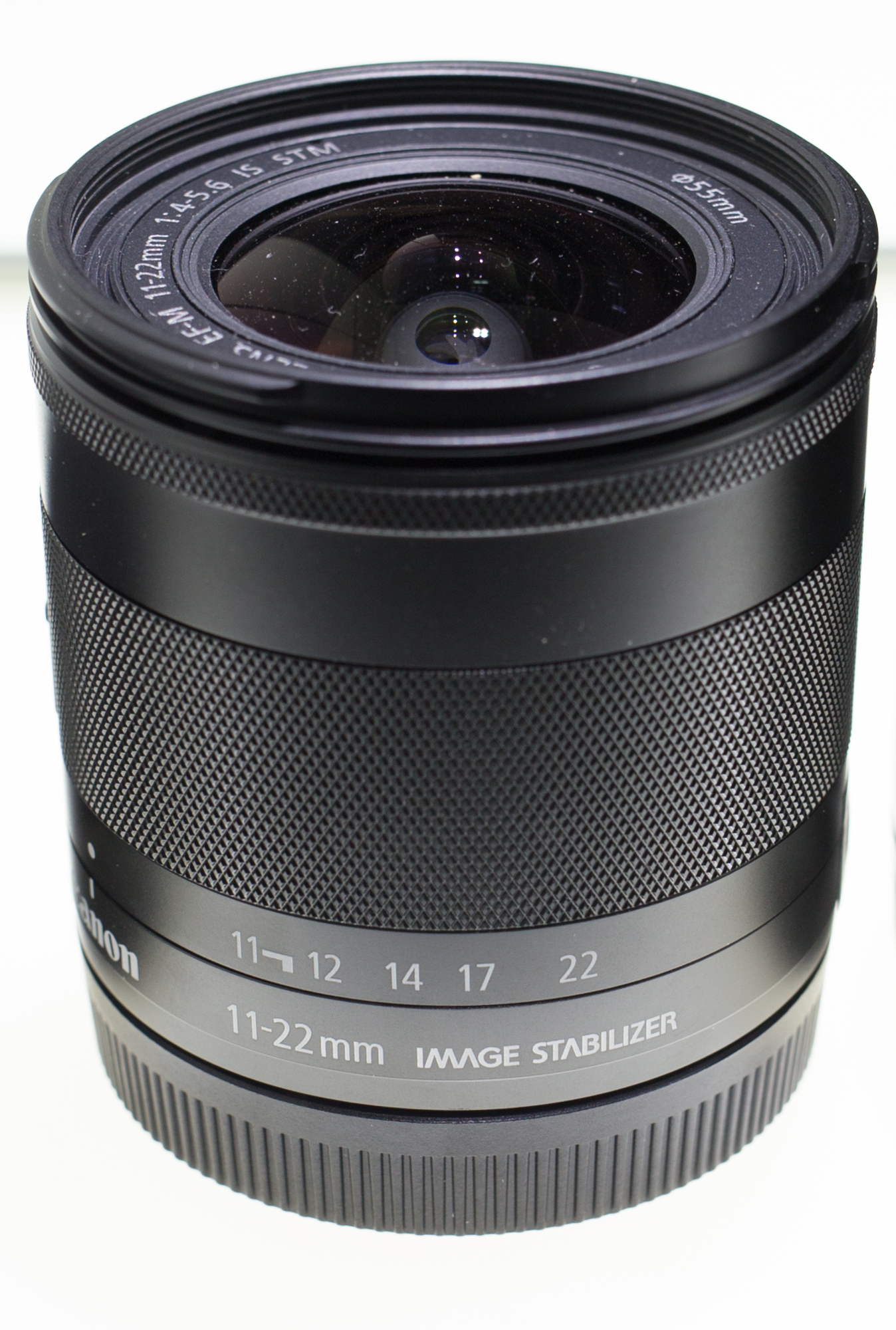
EF-M 11–22 mm f/4–5.6 IS STM

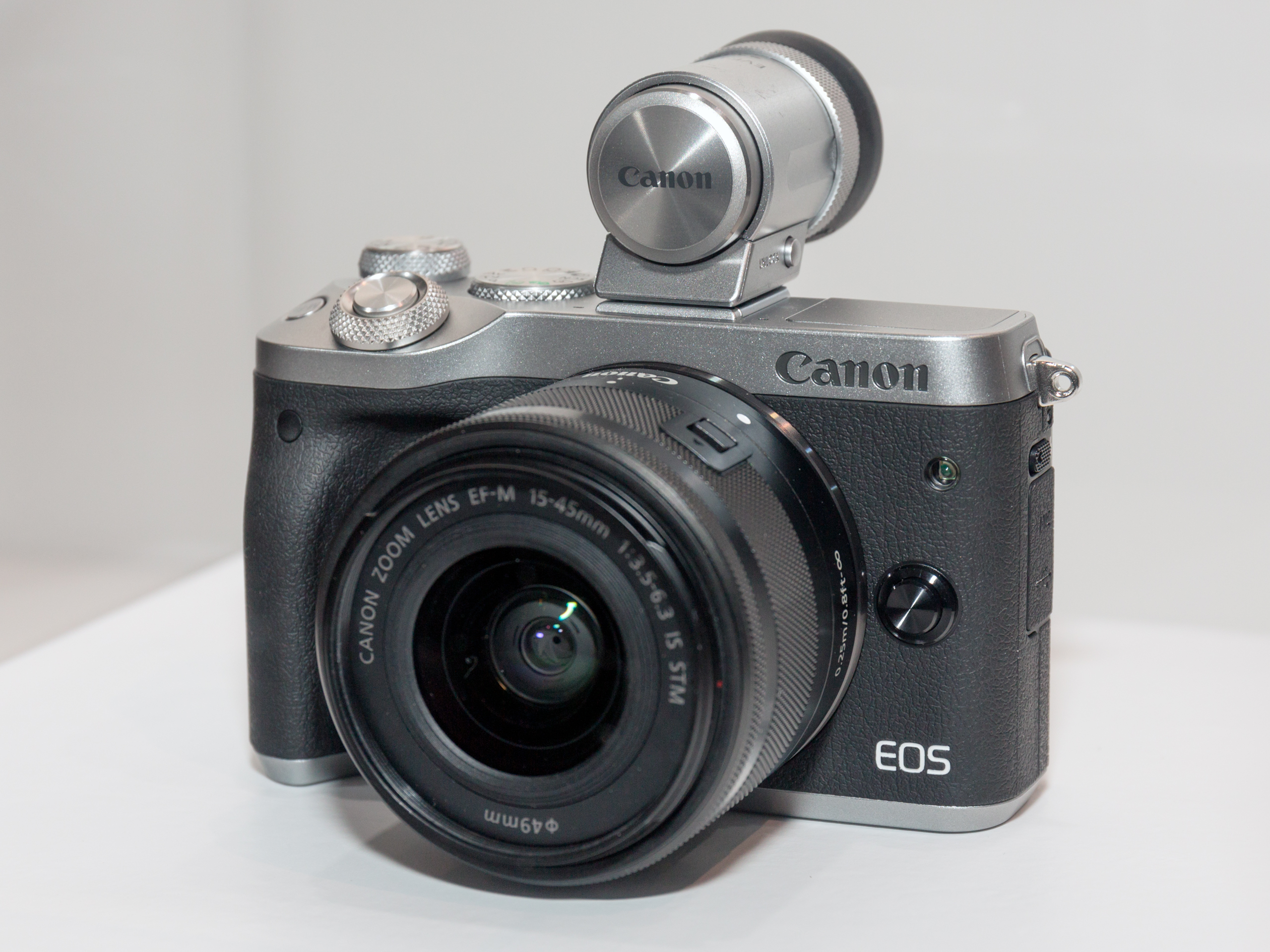
EF-M 15–45 mm f/3.5–6.3 IS STM mounted on an EOS M6

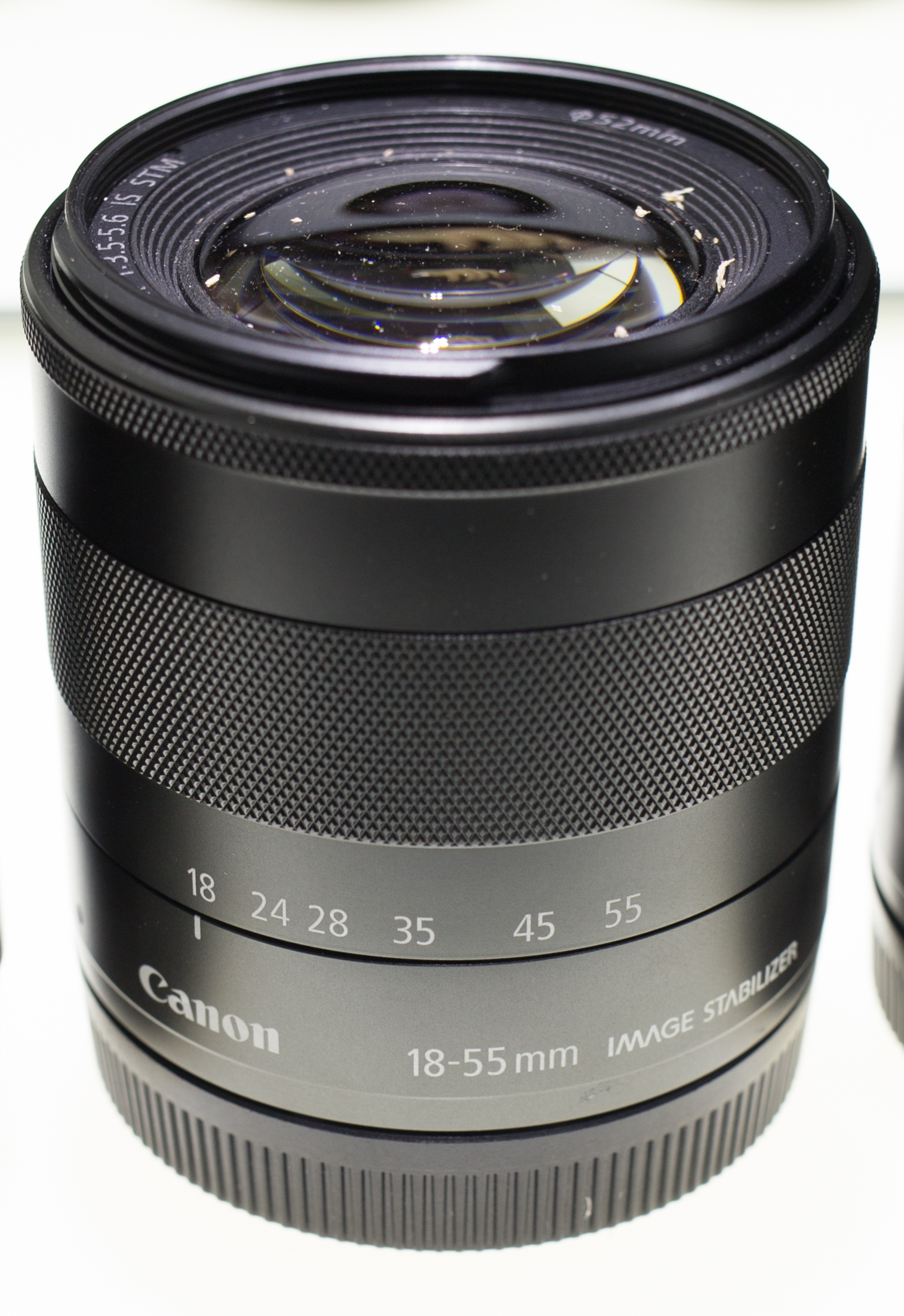
EF-M 18–55 mm f/3.5–5.6 IS STM

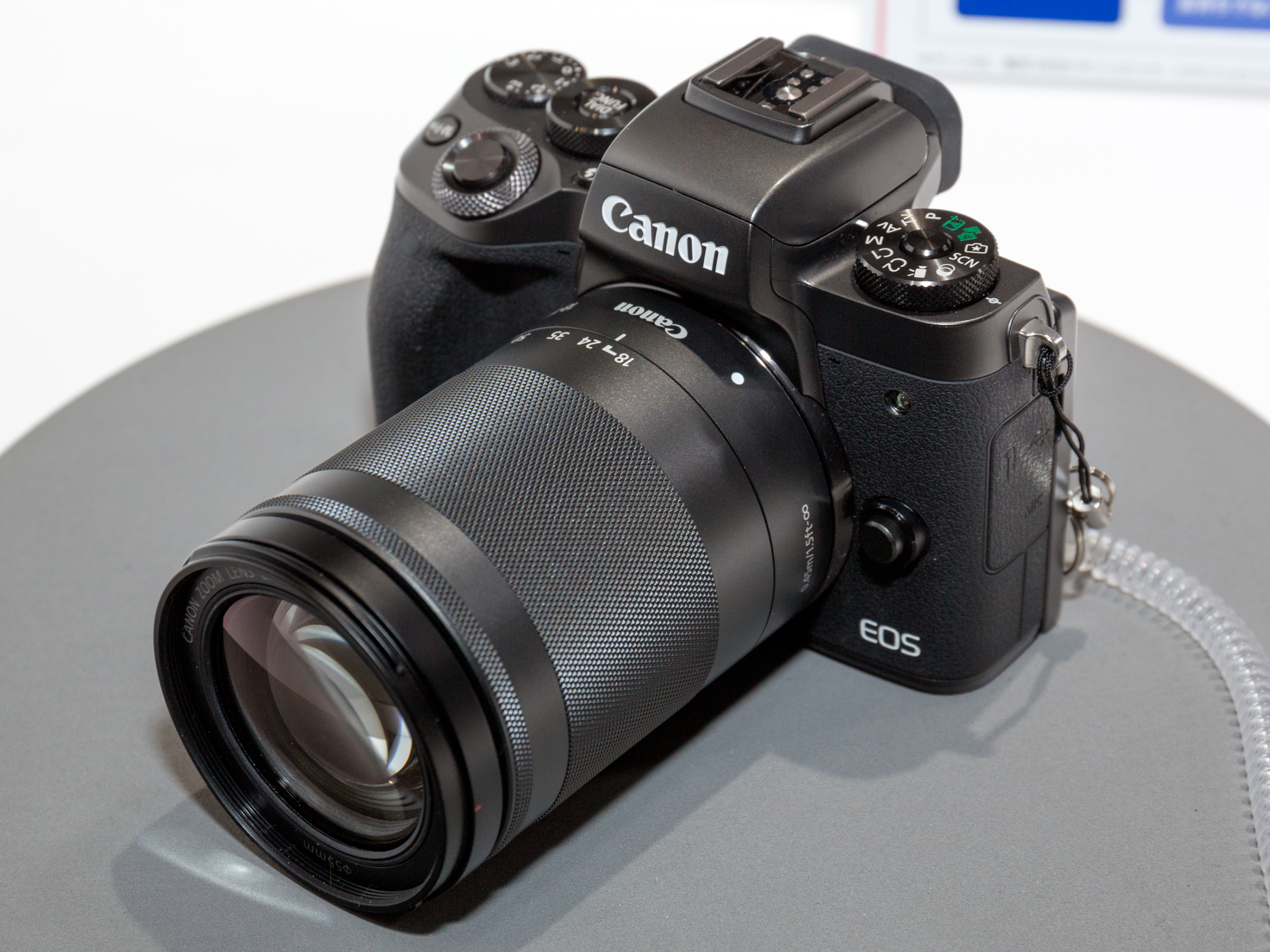
EF-M 18–150 mm f/3.5–6.3 IS STM mounted at an EOS M5

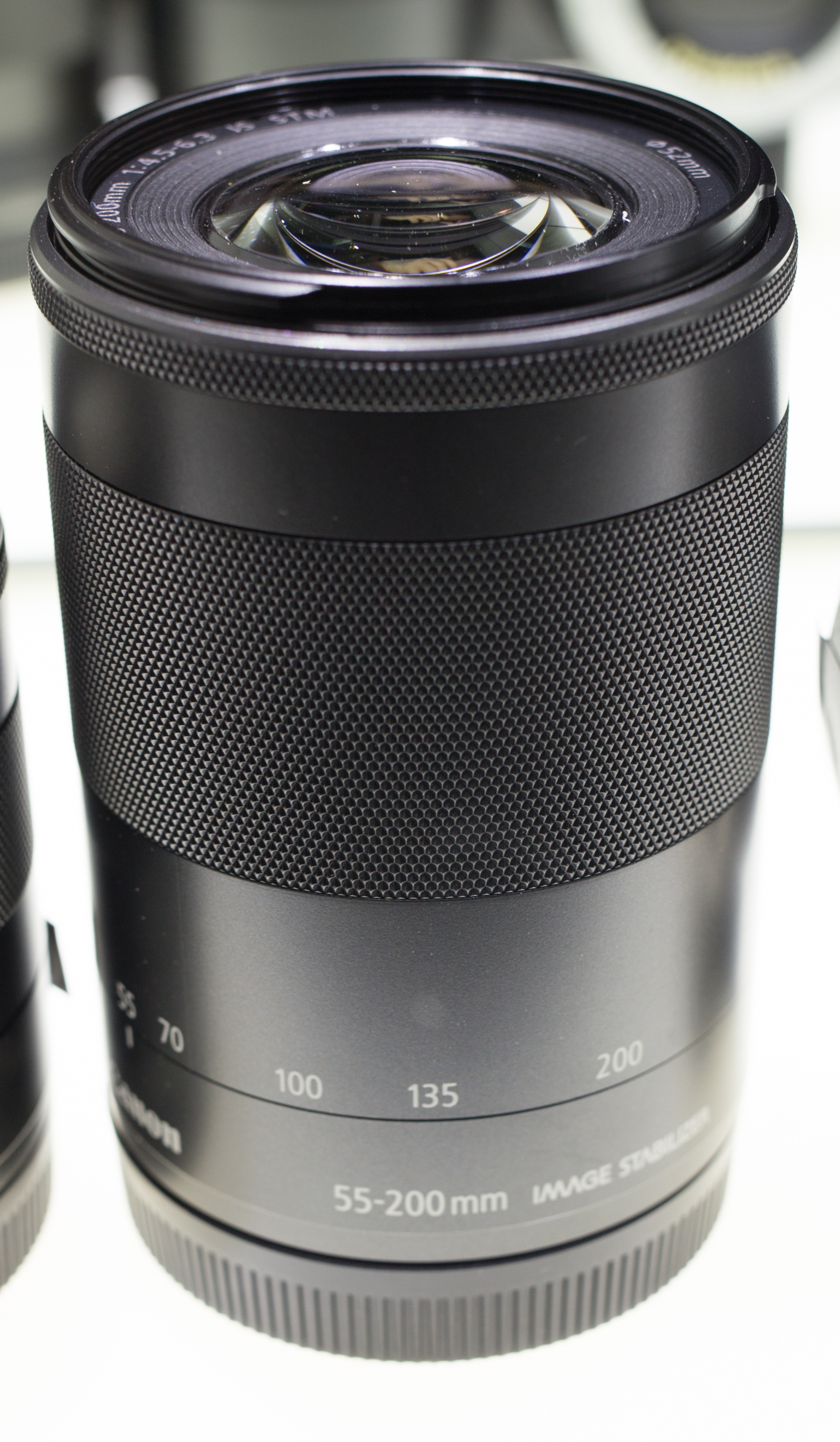
EF-M 55–200 mm f/4.5–6.3 IS STM

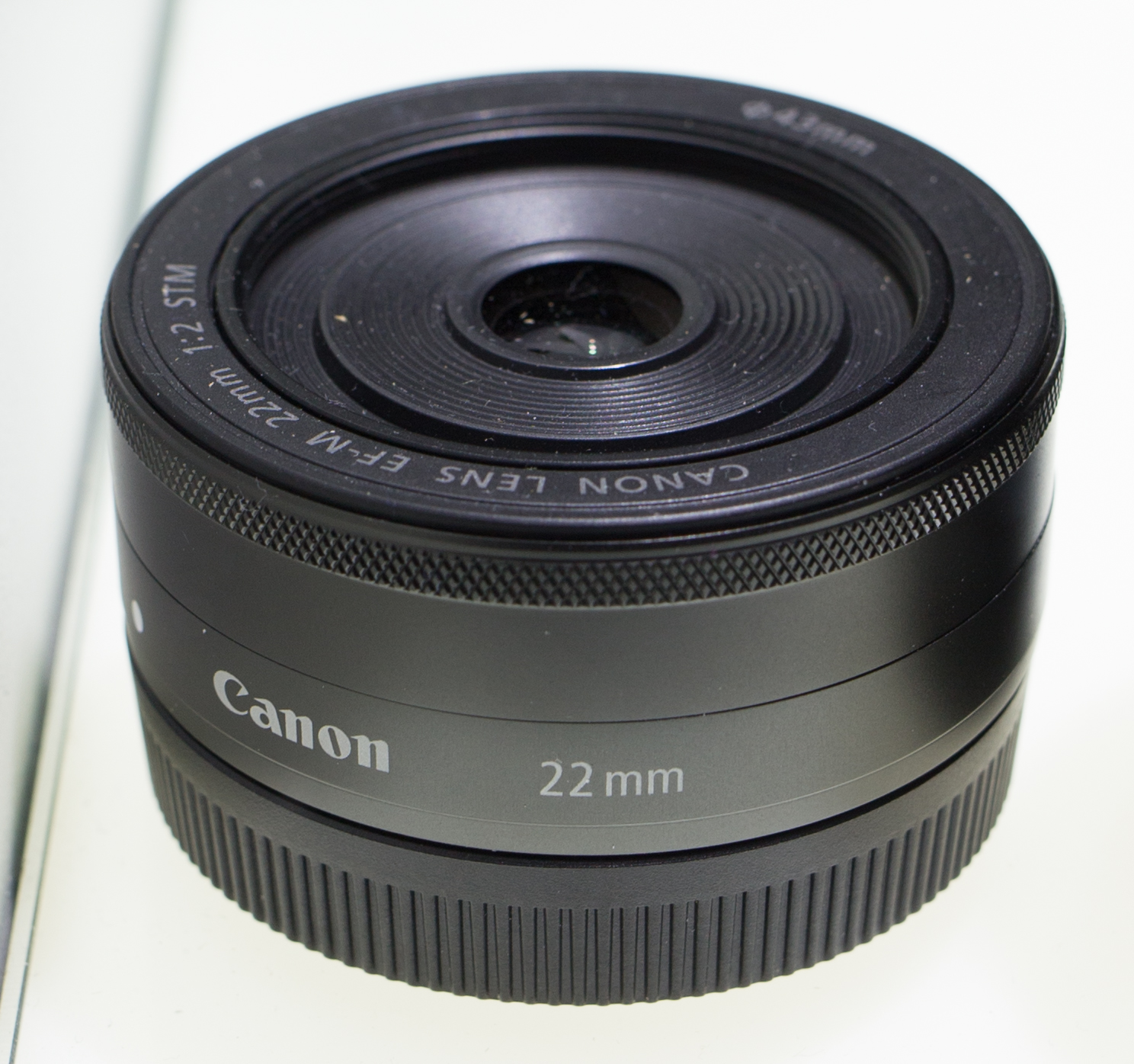
EF-M 22 mm f/2 STM

Type	Focal Length	2012	2013	2014	2015	2016	2017	2018	2019	2020	2021	2022
Prime	22mm	EF-M 22mm f/2 STM										
Prime	28mm					EF-M 28mm f/3.5 Macro IS STM						
Prime	32mm							EF-M 32mm f/1.4 STM				
Zoom	11–22mm		EF-M 11–22mm f/4–5.6 IS STM									
Zoom	15–45mm				EF-M 15–45mm f/3.5–6.3 IS STM							
Zoom	18–55mm	EF-M 18–55mm f/3.5–5.6 IS STM										
Zoom	18–150mm					EF-M 18–150mm f/3.5–6.3 IS STM						
Zoom	55–200mm			EF-M 55–200mm f/4.5–6.3 IS STM								
