= Canon EF-M 32mm lens =

Prime lens by Canon Inc

Canon EF-M 32mm f/1.4 STM
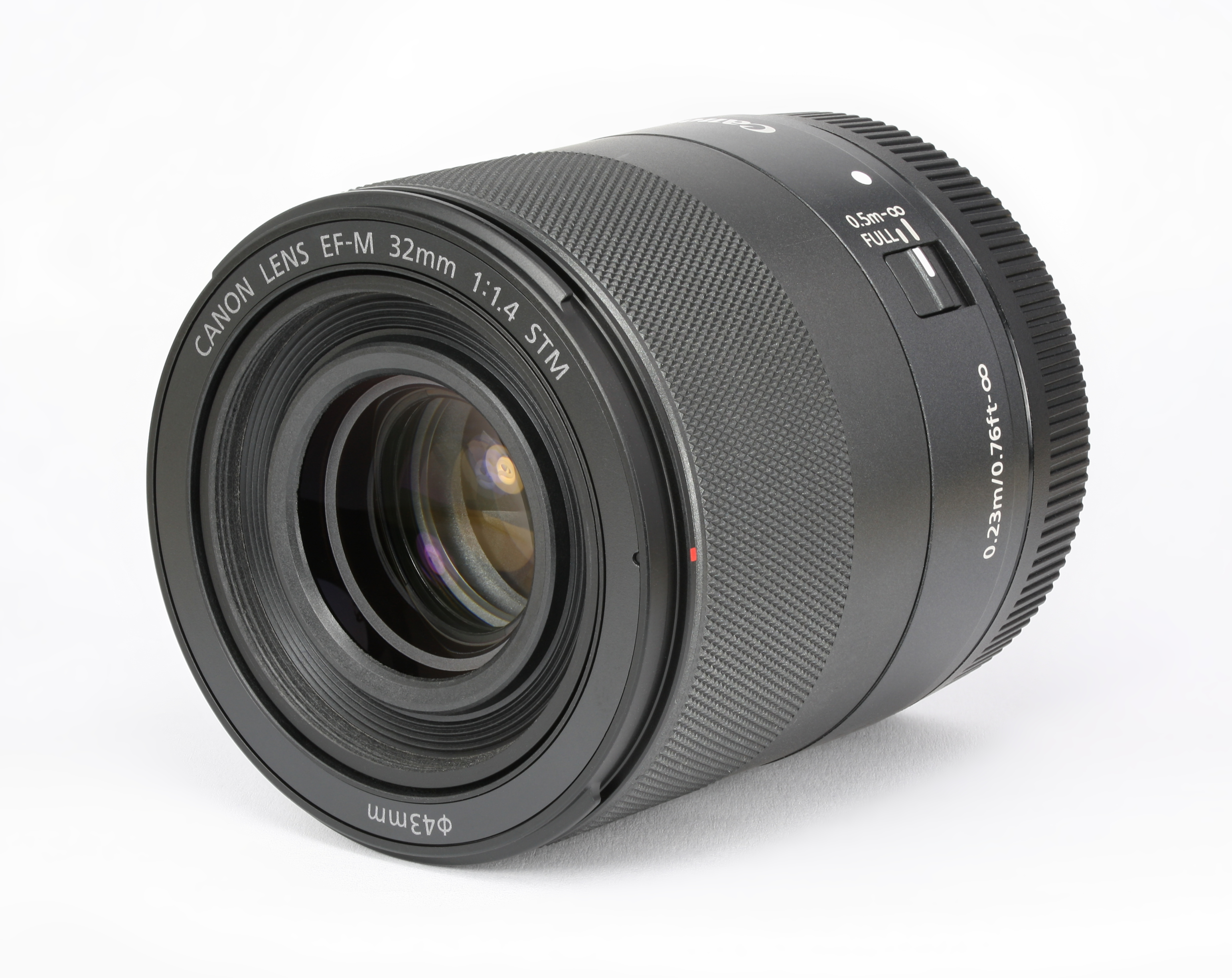
- Maker: Canon
- Lens mount(s): Canon EF-M

Technical data
- Type: Prime
- Focus drive: Stepping motor
- Focal length: 32mm
- Focal length (35mm equiv.): 51mm
- Aperture (max/min): f/1.4 / f/16
- Close focus distance: 0.23 metres (0.75 ft)
- Max. magnification: 1:4
- Diaphragm blades: 7
- Construction: 14 elements in 8 groups

Features
- Short back focus: No No
- Weather-sealing: No No
- Lens-based stabilization: No No
- Macro capable: No No
- Aperture ring: No No

Physical
- Max. length: 56.5 millimetres (2.22 in)
- Diameter: 60.9 millimetres (2.40 in)
- Weight: 235 grams (0.518 lb)
- Filter diameter: 43 millimetres (1.7 in)
- Color: black

Accessories
- Lens hood: ES-60

History
- Introduction: 2018

Retail info
- MSRP: 72'000 JPY

The EF-M 32mm f/1.4 STM is an interchangeable prime lens introduced by Canon in September 2018. The lens is based on the EF-M mount that is used in Canon's lineup of mirrorless cameras. It currently is the latest lens published that uses the EF-M lens mount.

With a maximum value of f/1.4, it has the largest aperture of all Canon EF-M mount lenses.

== Gallery ==
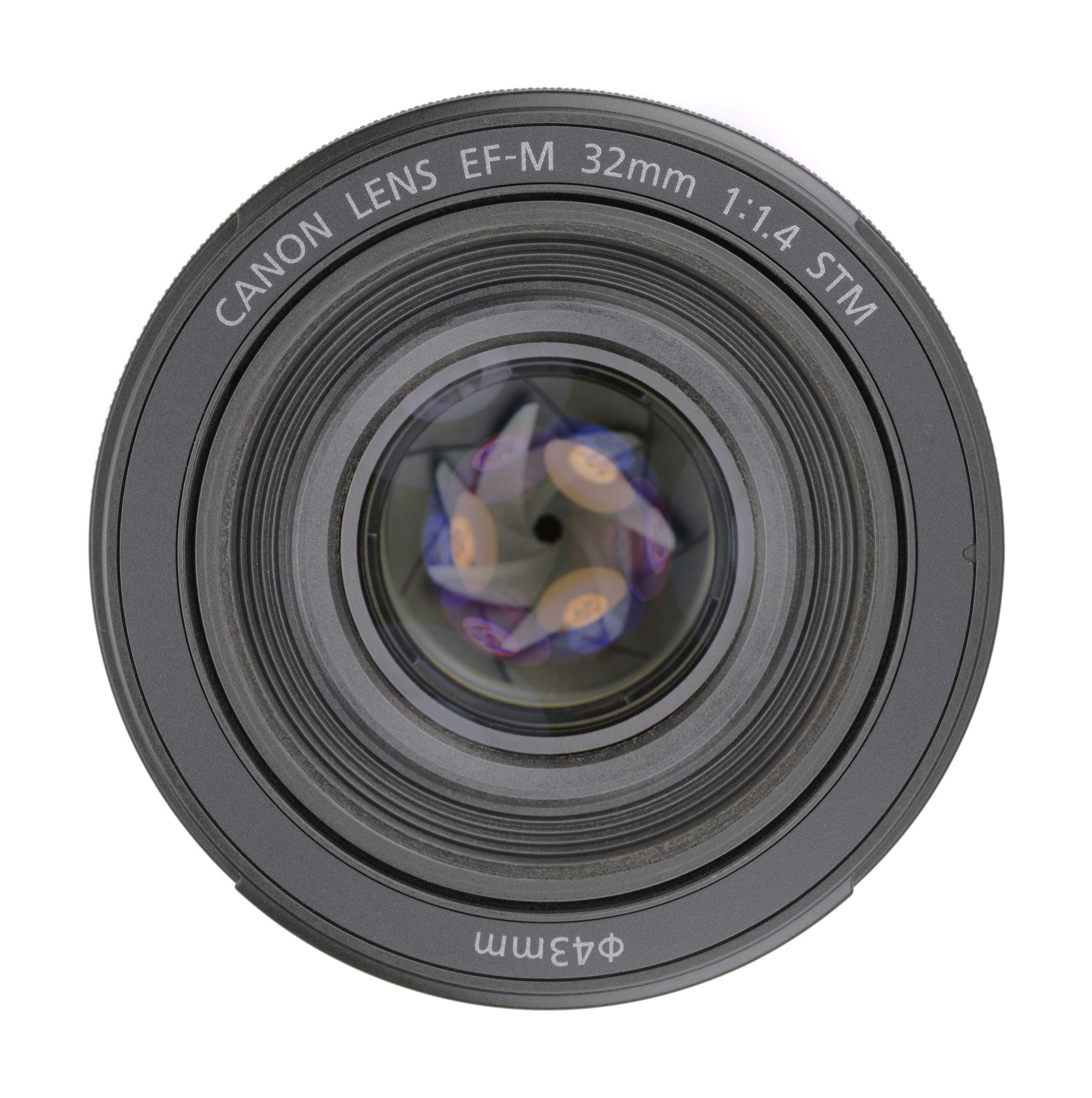
Front view

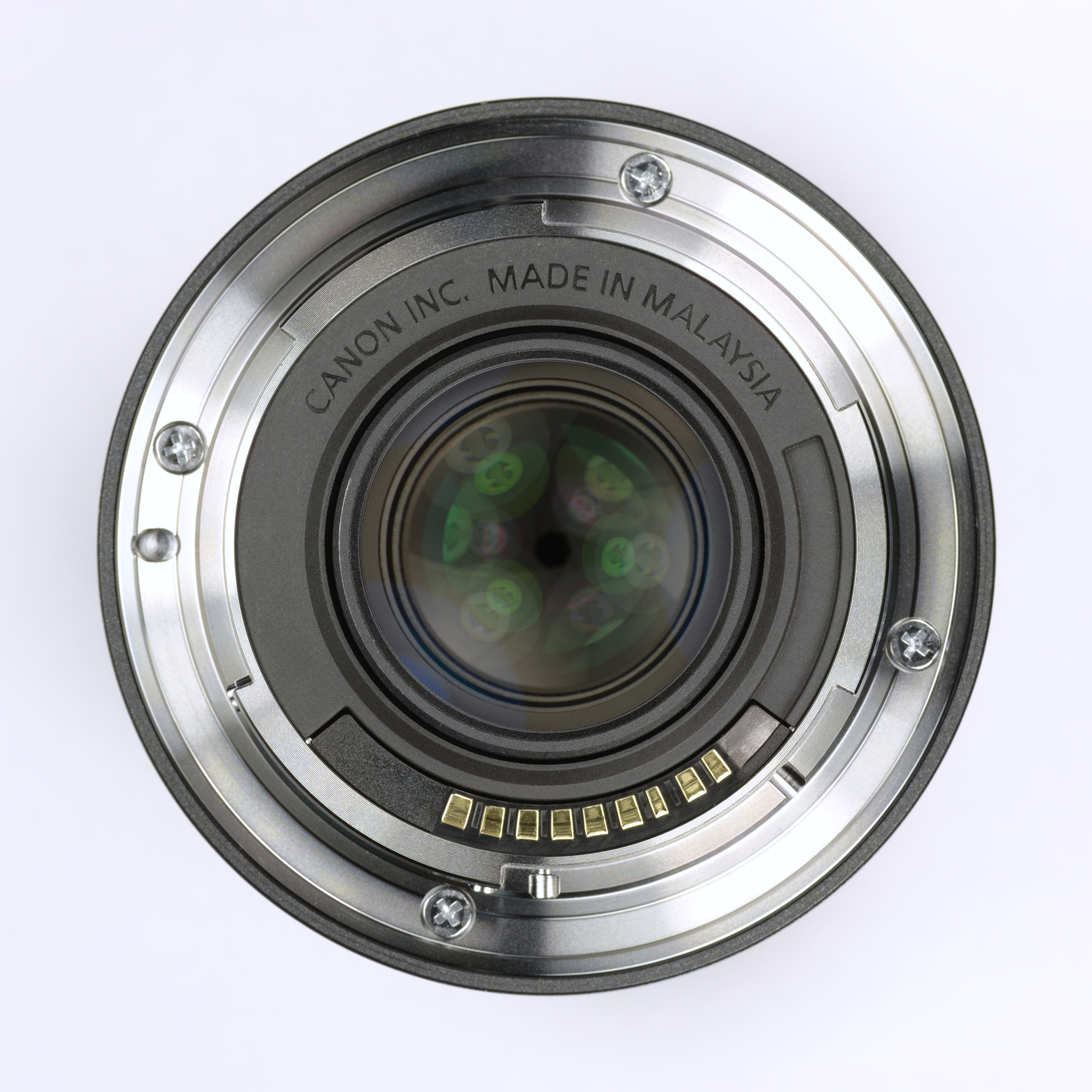
Bottom view

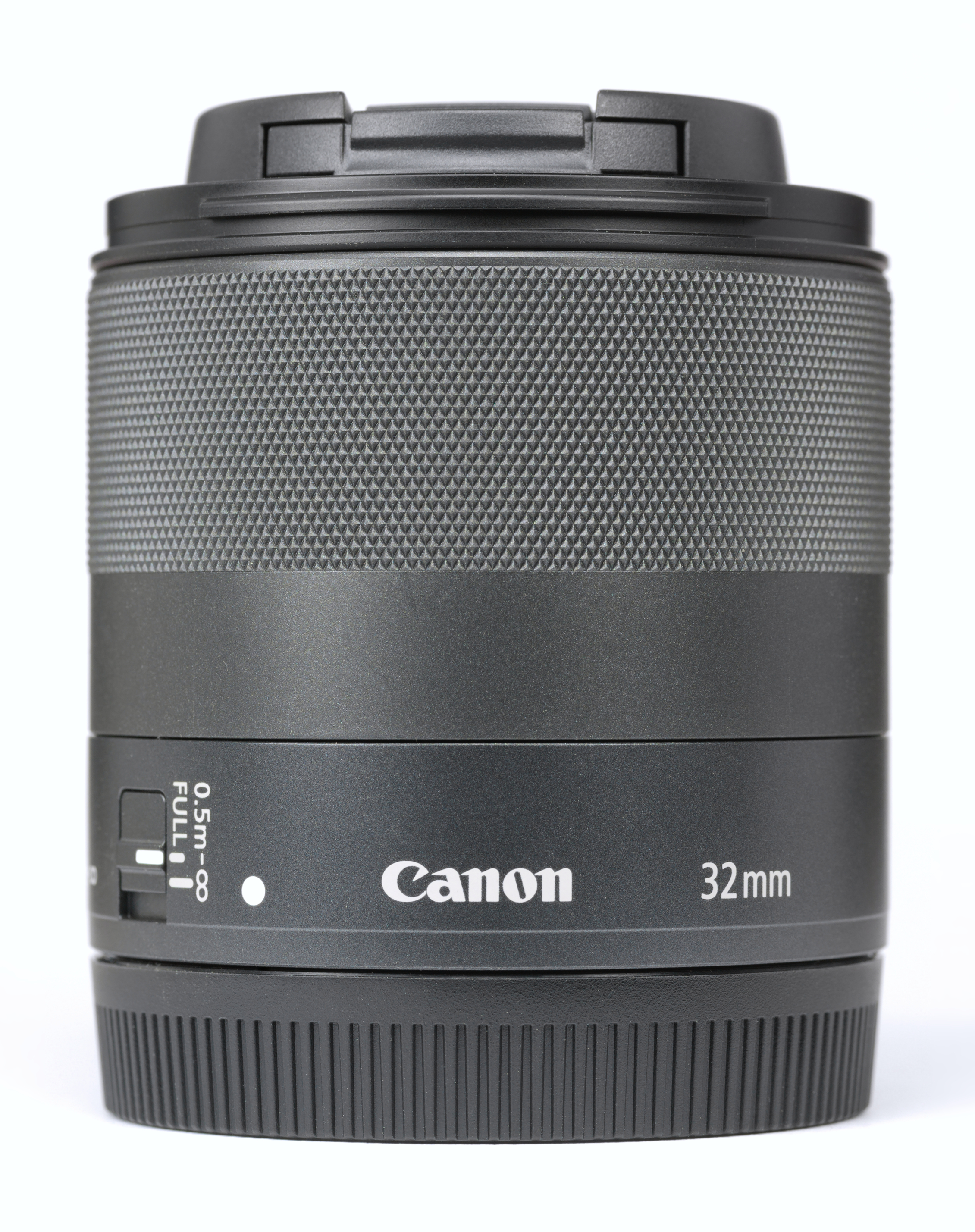
Side view

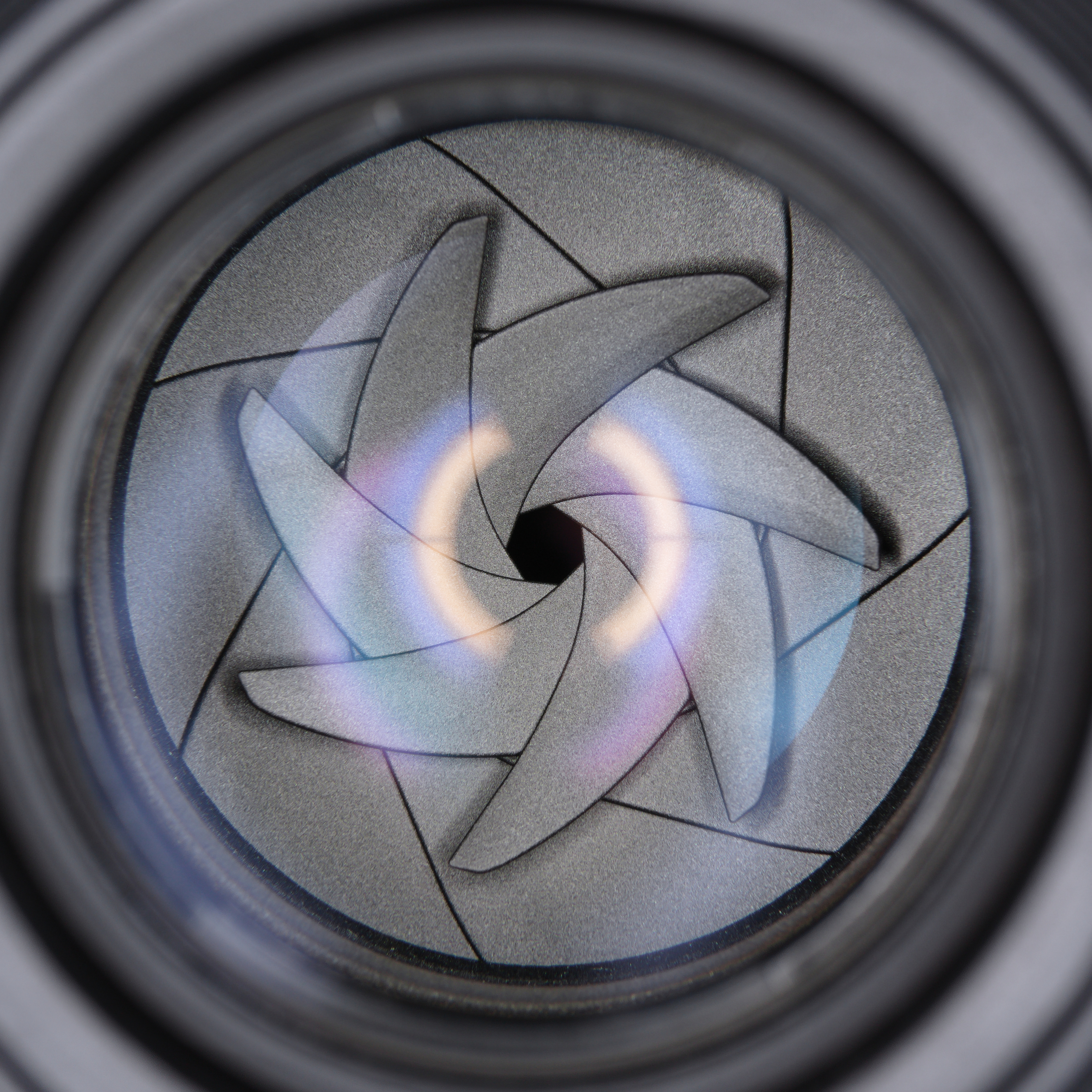
The lens' seven aperture blades seen from the front
