= Canon EF-M 15–45mm lens =

Canon EF-M 15–45 mm f/3.5–6.3 IS STM
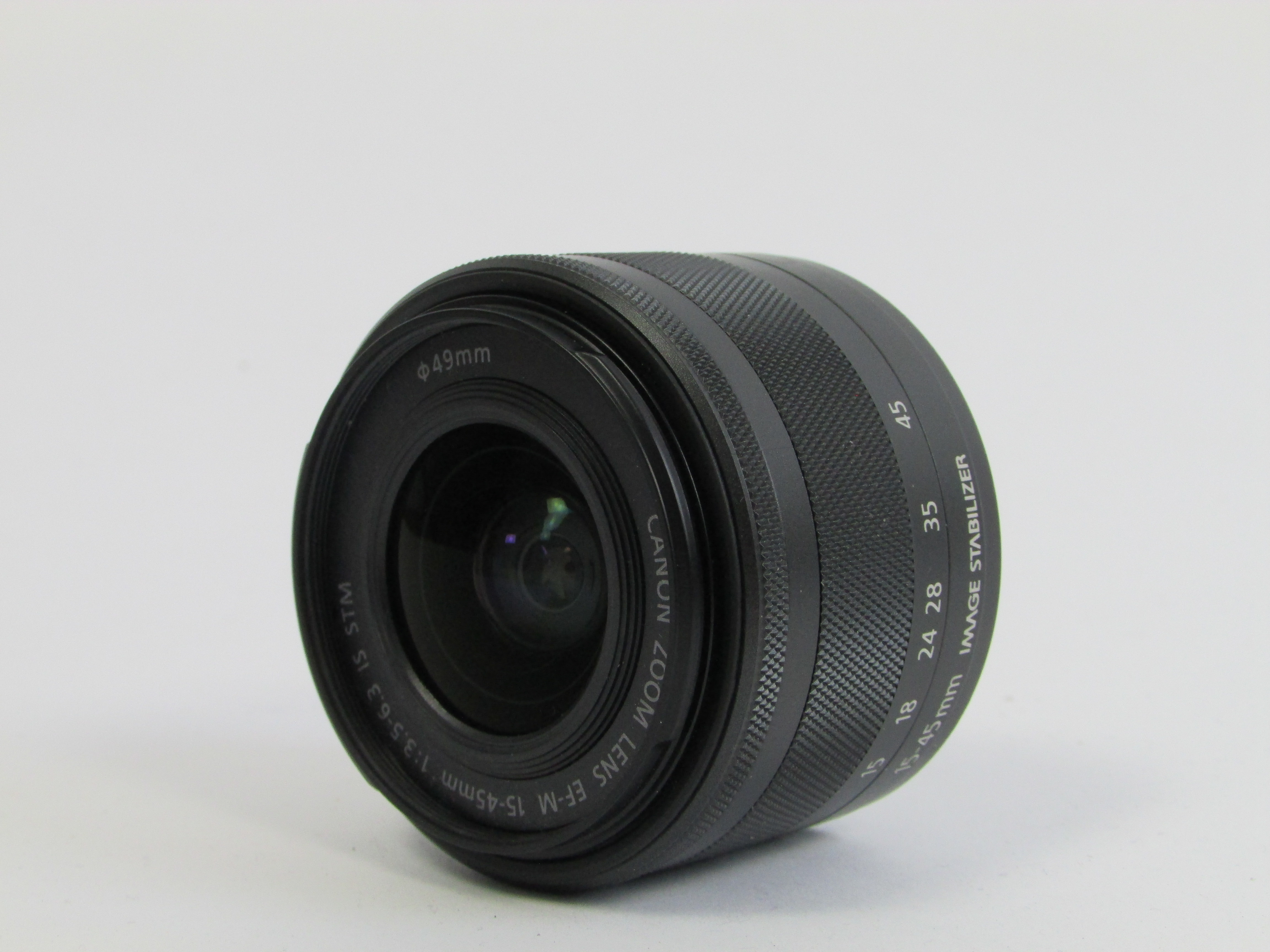
- EF-M 15–45 mm
- Maker: Canon Inc.
- Lens mount: Canon EF-M lens mount

Technical data
- Type: Zoom
- Focus drive: Stepping motor
- Focal length: 15–45 mm
- Focal length (35mm equiv.): 24–72 mm
- Crop factor: 1.6
- Aperture (max/min): f/3.5–6.3 / f/22–40 (38 at 1/3 steps)
- Close focus distance: 0.25 m (0.82 ft)
- Max. magnification: 0.25×
- Diaphragm blades: 7
- Construction: 10 elements in 9 groups

Features
- Weather-sealing: No No
- Lens-based stabilization: Yes Yes

Physical
- Max. length: 44.5 mm (1.75 in)
- Diameter: 60.9 mm (2.40 in)
- Weight: 130 g (0.29 lb)
- Filter diameter: 49 mm

Accessories
- Lens hood: EW-53
- Case: LP811

Angle of view
- Horizontal: 74°10′ - 28°20′
- Vertical: 53°30′ - 19°05′
- Diagonal: 84°30′ - 33°40′

History
- Introduction: 2015

Retail info
- MSRP: 299.99 € (as of October 2015)

The Canon EF-M 15-45mm f/3.5-6.3 IS STM is an interchangeable zoom lens, covering fields of view from wide-angle to short telephoto, for the Canon EF-M system of Canon Inc. mirrorless interchangeable-lens camera. It was announced by Canon on October 13, 2015, together with the new Canon EOS M10 camera. The lens uses STM (stepping motor) technology and a collapsible design which takes up less space when the lens is not in use.

The lens is available in two colors, black and silver.

== Photographs taken with a Canon EOS M50m2 ==
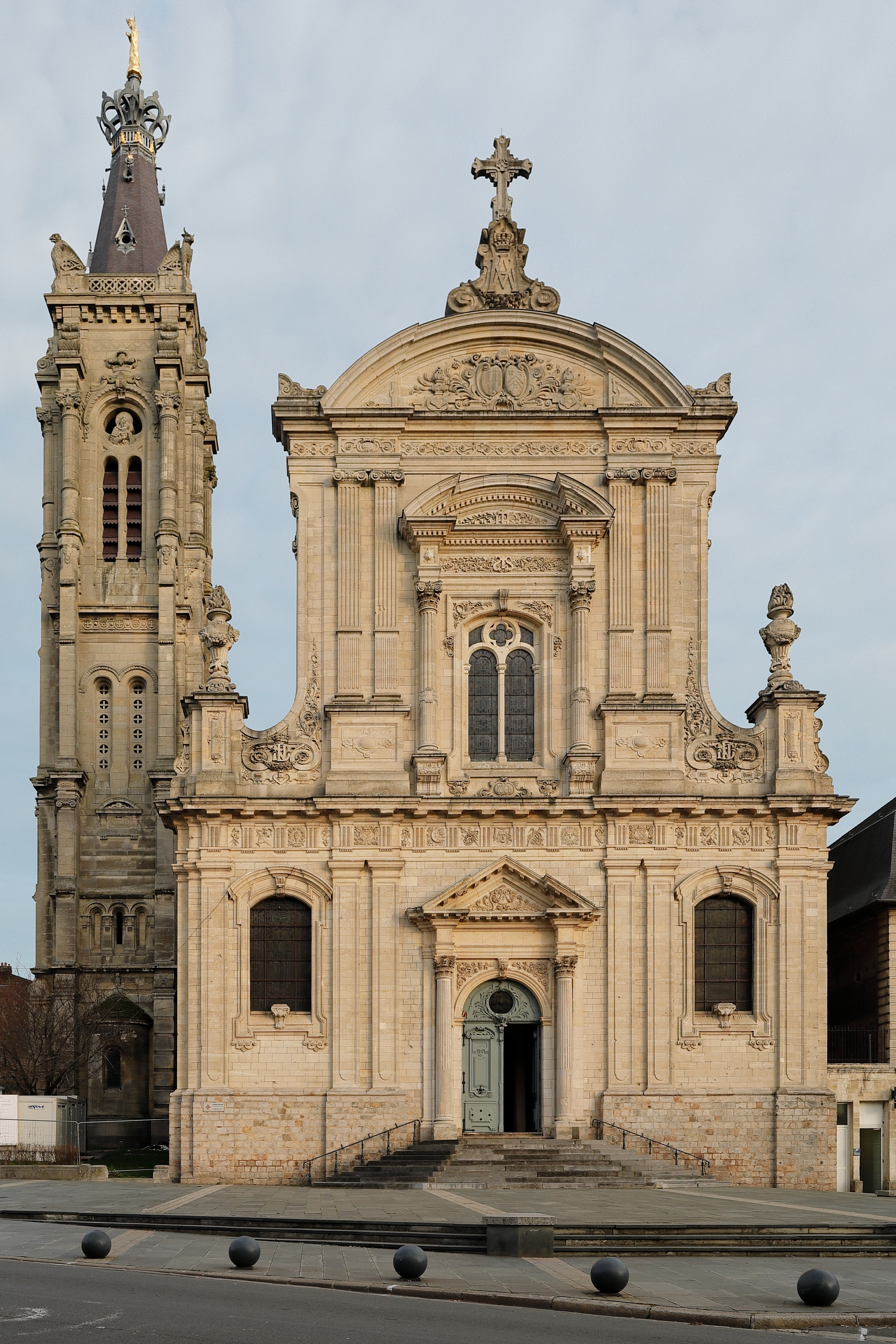

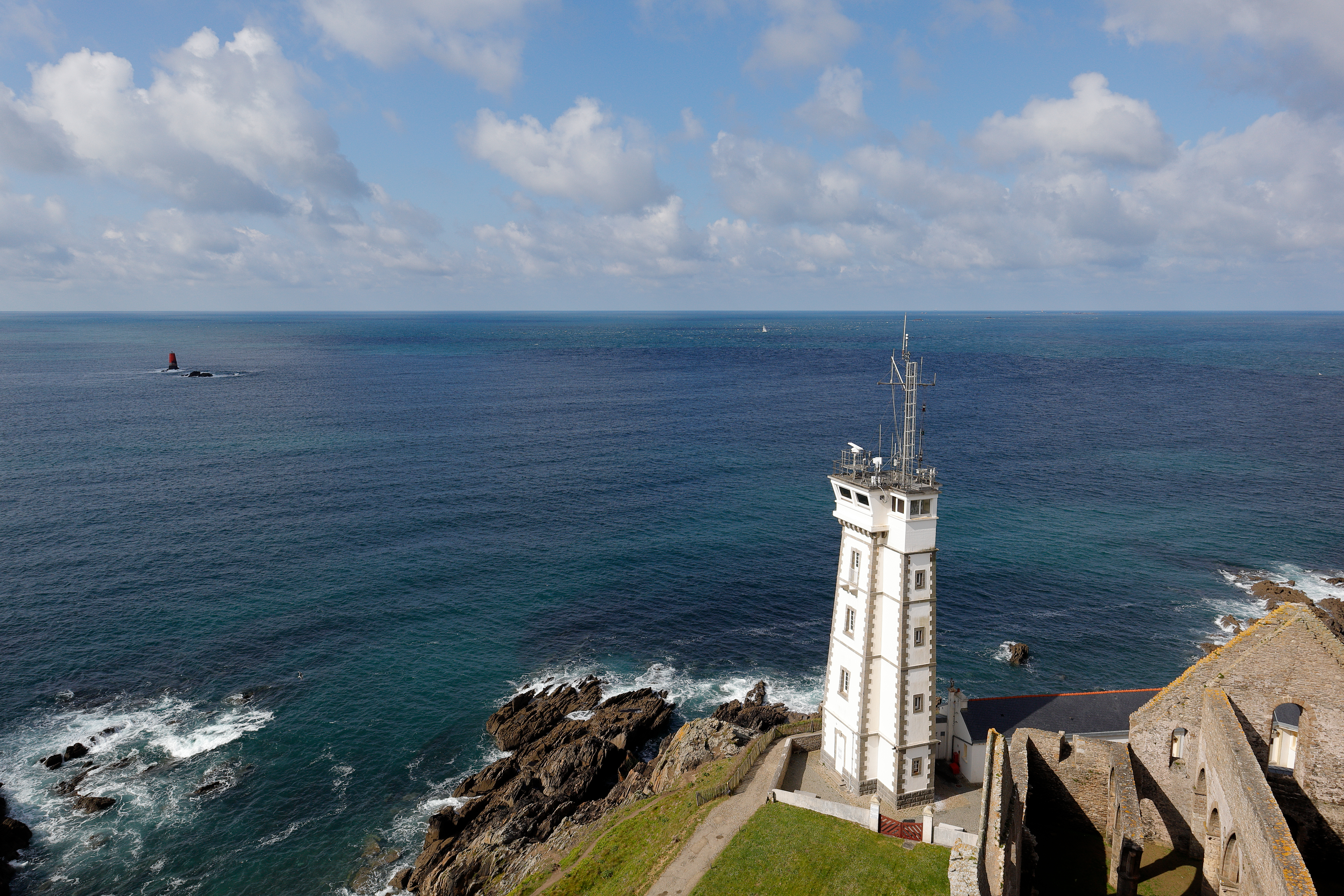

== See also ==
- List of standard zoom lenses
