= Viltrox =

Manufacturer of photographic lenses and other photographic equipment

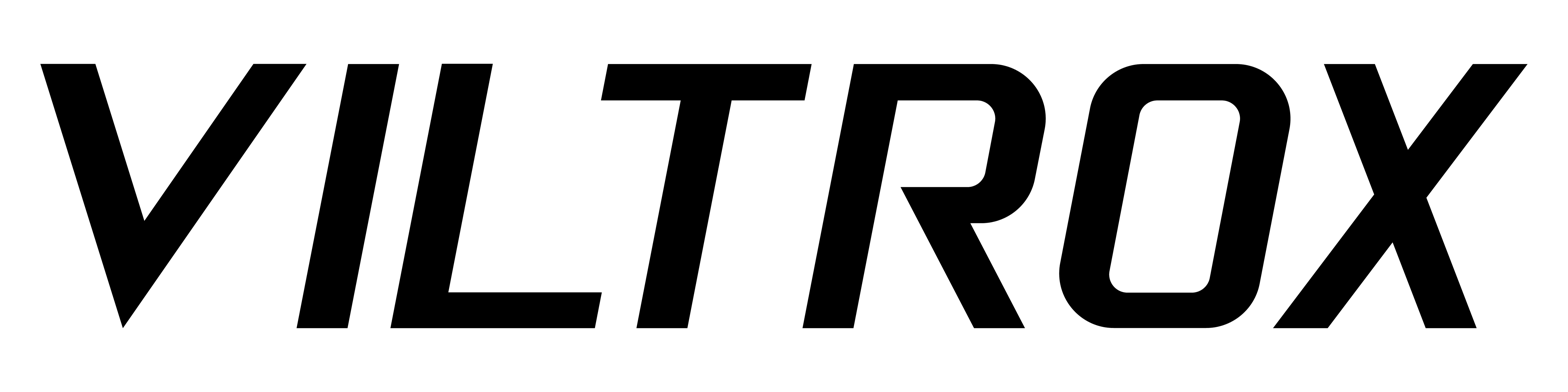
- Logo since 2022
- Industry: Photographic equipment
- Founded: 2009 (17 years ago) in Shenzhen, China
- Products: Photographic lenses; Cinema lenses; Lens adapters; Photo lighting; Camera monitors
- Owner: Shenzhen Jueying Technology Co., Ltd.
- Website: Official website in English

Viltrox is a Chinese brand of lenses and other photographic accessories, established in 2009 by Shenzhen Jueying Technology Co., Ltd in Shenzhen, China.

== History ==
- 2009 – brand launch
- 2018 – first manual focus lens
- 2019 – first autofocus lens
- 2022 – start of current series lineup
- 2025 – joined L-Mount Alliance

In mid-2022, Viltrox representative reported that company has been told by Canon to stop selling all RF mount products. At that point only one such lens (85mm f/1.8 for full frame) was produced by Viltrox.

In January 2026, several websites reported Nikon filing a patent infringement lawsuit against Viltrox in China. Lawsuit wasn't acknowledged by either side, and new lenses for Nikon Z-mount have since been released by Viltrox and other third-party manufacturers. In July 2026, Nikon has reportedly lost that lawsuit.

== Products ==
Viltrox makes wide range of photographic equipment, including photo and cinema lenses, lens adapters, teleconverters, flash units, video lights and external camera monitors.

== Photographic lenses ==
Modern lineup consists of following series of autofocus lenses for mirrorless cameras:

- Lab – flagship lenses with largest apertures and premium features
- Pro – high-end lenses with large apertures and VCM autofocus motors
- Evo – mid-range lenses with smaller apertures
- Air – compact lightweight lenses with minimal controls
- Chip – pancake-style lens without manual controls
- DF and C – initial series of Viltrox autofocus lenses (for full frame and crop sensors respectively)

For higher-end lenses Viltrox uses glass supplied by Hoya.

=== Manual focus lenses ===
- MF 20mm f/1.8 – full frame (E, Z mounts)
- MF 85mm f/1.8 – full frame (E-mount)

=== Autofocus prime lenses ===
==== For full frame cameras ====
These lenses create full frame-covering image circle, but some of them also exist in versions for Fujifilm X-mount, which is only used in cameras with APS-C sensors.

Lens, year of initial release, and available mounts
	14-16mm	18-20mm	24-25mm	26-28mm	35-43mm	45-55mm	85-90mm	135mm
Lab					35mm f/1.2 2025; E, Z			135mm f/1.8 2024; E, Z
Pro					35mm f/1.4 2026; E, Z	50mm f/1.4 2025; E, Z	85mm f/1.4 2025; E, Z	
Evo				26mm f/2.8 2026; E, Z	35mm f/1.8 2026; E, Z	55mm f/1.8 2026; E, Z	85mm f/2 2025; E, Z	
Air	14mm f/4 2025; E, L, Z	20mm f/2.8 2023; E, L, Z			40mm f/2.5 2024; E, L, Z	50mm f/2 2025; E, L, Z		
Chip				28mm f/4.5 2024; E, L, Z, X				
DF	16mm f/1.8 2024; E, L, Z		24mm f/1.8 2021; E, Z	28mm f/1.8 2023; E, Z	35mm f/1.8 2021; E, Z	50mm f/1.8 2021; E, Z	85mm f/1.8 II; 2020 (Note: DF 85mm f/1.8 version II was introduced in 2020. First version released in 2019 was short-lived); E, Z, X, RF (Note: Limited number of DF 85mm f/1.8 II lenses for RF-mount was produced before Canon demanded sales to stop)	

Discontinued models:

- DF 35mm f/1.8
- DF 50mm f/1.8

==== For APS-C cameras ====
Lens, year of initial release, and available mounts
	9-11mm	12-14mm	15-18mm	23-28mm	33-40mm	55-56mm	70-75mm	85-90mm
Pro				27mm f/1.2 2023; E, X, Z		56mm f/1.2 2025; E, X, Z	75mm f/1.2 2022; E, X, Z	
Evo							75mm f/1.8 2026; E, X, Z	90mm f/2.2 2026; E, X, Z
Air	9mm f/2.8 2025; E, X, Z		15mm f/1.7 2025; E, X, Z	25mm f/1.7 2025; E, X, Z	35mm f/1.7 2024; E, X, Z	56mm f/1.7 2024; E, X, Z		
Chip				28mm f/4.5 2024; X, E, L, Z				
C		13mm f/1.4 2022; E, X, Z		23mm f/1.4 2020; E, X, Z, EF-M	33mm f/1.4 2020; E, X, Z, EF-M	56mm f/1.4 2020; E, X, Z, EF-M		

==== For Micro Four Thirds cameras ====
- Air 25mm f/1.7 – China-only release (2026)
- Air 35mm f/1.7 – China-only release (2026)

== Cinema lenses ==
=== EPIC full frame anamorphic lenses ===
Manual focus, PL mount, 1.33x squeeze ratio, 3 flare options (blue, silver, no flare):

- 25mm T2.0
- 35mm T2.0 (+E, L, RF mounts)
- 50mm T2.0 (+E, L, RF mounts)
- 65mm T2.8 Macro
- 75mm T2.0 (+E, L, RF mounts)
- 100mm T2.0
- 135mm T2.4

=== Luna cinema zoom lenses ===
Manual focus, 10x zoom:

- 30-300mm T4.0 (46.5mm image circle)
- 42-420mm T5.6 (60mm image circle)

=== Cine Micro Four Thirds lenses ===
Manual focus, Micro Four Thirds mount:

- 23mm T1.5
- 33mm T1.5
- 56mm T1.5

=== Raze lenses for DJI Ronin 4D ===
Autofocus, DL mount:

- 16mm f/1.8
- 24mm f/1.8
- 28mm f/1.8
- 35mm f/1.8
- 50mm f/1.8
- 85mm f/1.8
- 90mm f/3.5 (not in the Raze series)

== Other products ==
- EF and E-mount teleconverters
- Autofocus adapter for manual focus PL lenses
- Mount-to-mount lens adapters: DSLR-to-mirrorless, and E-to-Z mount
- Macro extension rings
- Speed boosters
- Lights and on-camera flash units
- External camera monitors
- External batteries and power banks

== See also ==
- List of photographic equipment makers
- L-Mount Alliance
