= Canon EOS M50 Mark II =

2020 APS-C mirrorless camera

Canon EOS M50 Mark II Canon EOS Kiss M2
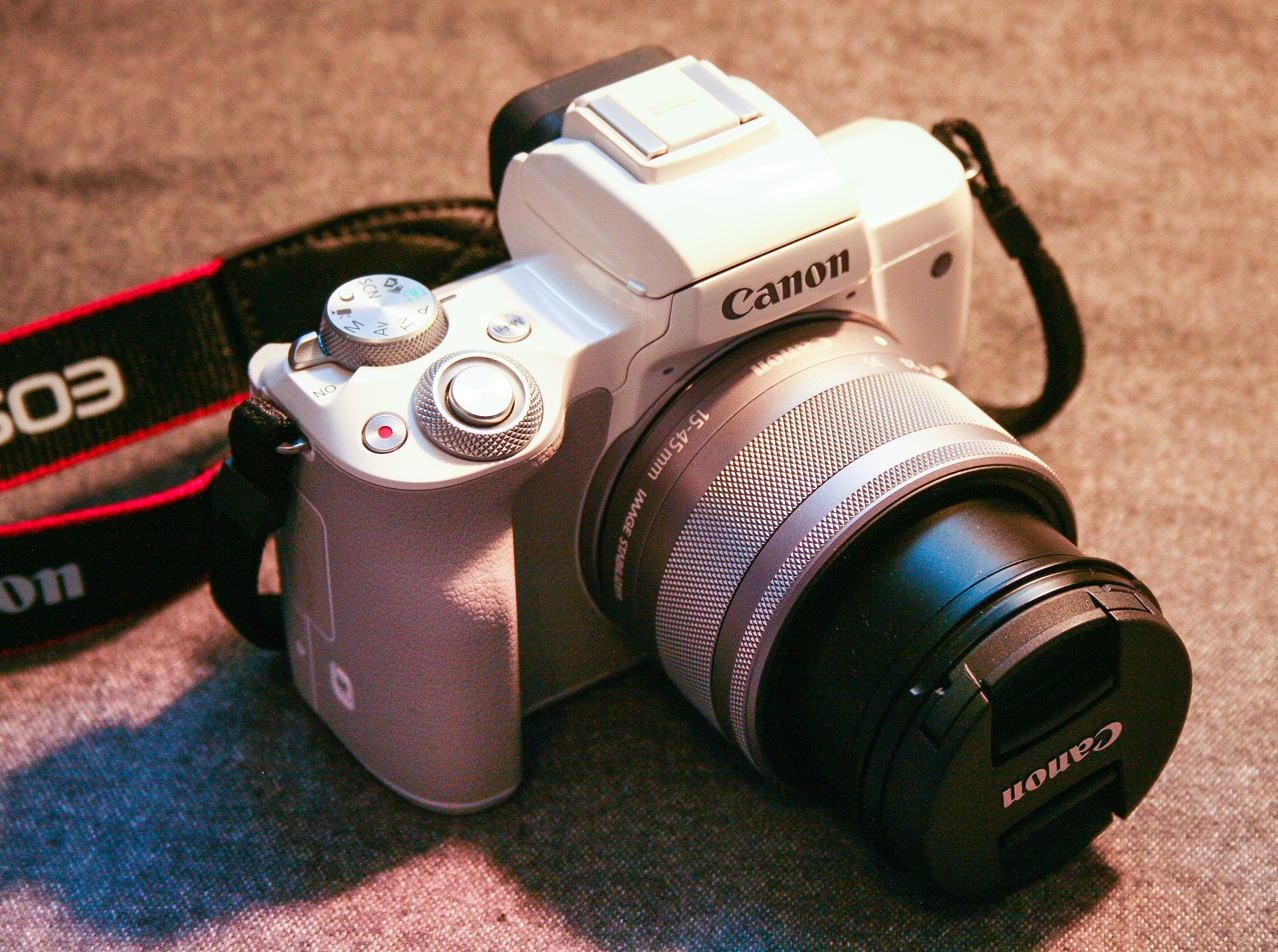

Overview
- Maker: Canon Inc.
- Type: Mirrorless interchangeable lens camera
- Production: 27 November 2020 – May 2023
- Intro price: $779.99

Lens
- Lens mount: Canon EF-M

Sensor/medium
- Sensor: dual-pixel CMOS sensor
- Sensor size: APS-C (22.3 × 14.9 mm)
- Maximum resolution: 24.1 MP
- Film speed: ISO 100 – 25,600 expandable to 51,200
- Recording medium: SDXC (UHS-I capable)

Focusing
- Focus: Dual Pixel CMOS autofocus

Shutter
- Frame rate: 10 fps; 7.4 fps with autofocus
- Shutter speeds: 30 s to 1/4000 s

Viewfinder
- Viewfinder: 2.36–million dot OLED EVF

Image processing
- Image processor: DIGIC 8

General
- Video recording: 4K resolution (23.98 fps - 1.6x crop) / 1080p (up to 60p) with DPAF, 3.5mm mic-in & clean 4:2:2 HDMI output
- LCD screen: 3.2 in 1.62-million-dot LCD
- Battery: LP-E12 (350 shots CIPA rating)
- Data port(s): Wi-Fi, Bluetooth
- Dimensions: 116.3 mm × 88.1 mm × 58.7 mm (4.58 in × 3.47 in × 2.31 in)
- Weight: 387 g (13.7 oz)
- Made in: Japan

Chronology
- Predecessor: Canon EOS M50
- Successor: Canon EOS R50 (RF mirrorless)

The Canon EOS M50 Mark II, also known as the EOS Kiss M2 in Japan, is a 24.1 megapixels entry-mid-level mirrorless interchangeable-lens camera announced by Canon on October 14, 2020. As a part of the mirrorless EOS M line, it was the successor to the Canon EOS M50, sitting above the entry-level Canon EOS M200 and below the enthusiast-oriented Canon EOS M6 Mark II.

== Features ==
- 24.1 effective megapixel APS-C CMOS sensor
- DIGIC 8 image processor with 14-bit processing
- Dual Pixel Auto-Focus.
- ISO 100 – 25,600, expandable up to 51,200.
- 2.36-million dot OLED built-in electronic viewfinder (EVF).
- 1080p Full HD video recording at 24p, 25p, 30p, 50p and 60p.
- 4K video (UHD) video recording at 23.98 fps or 25 fps (PAL / NTSC), 4K mode is limited to a 1.6x Crop factor of the APS-C Crop-sized sensor and limited to 24p or 25p, no 30 nor 60p.
- 10 frames per second continuous shooting, 7.4 with AF.
- 3.2" vari-angle LCD touchscreen with 1,6m dots resolution.
- 3.5 mm microphone jack for external microphones
- Bluetooth (NFC dropped from the MK II)

== New Features to the M50 Mark II ==
Over the M50 it replaces, the new features include:

- Improved autofocus including eye autofocus for stills and video.
- Vertical video shooting support.
- Newly added tap video record button and movie self-timer on the LCD touchscreen for better Vlogging experience
- High quality webcam capability, with the free EOS Webcam Utility software or Clean HDMI output
- Wireless YouTube Livestreaming capability
- The ability to tap the screen to auto focus on your subject while looking through the EVF, helping to control who the main focus of the image is.
- 250 shots CIPA rated battery life versus 235 shots on the previous model.
- NFC is dropped from the MK II compared to the previous M50 that had it.

The rest of the camera is identical to the M50 it replaces, including the physical body, internal & external component, and all the features/capabilities of the camera, thus the M50 Mark II is a mild refresh to the already successful camera.

== Gallery: Photographs taken with a Canon EOS M50m2 ==
Lens Canon EF-M 15-45 mm STM

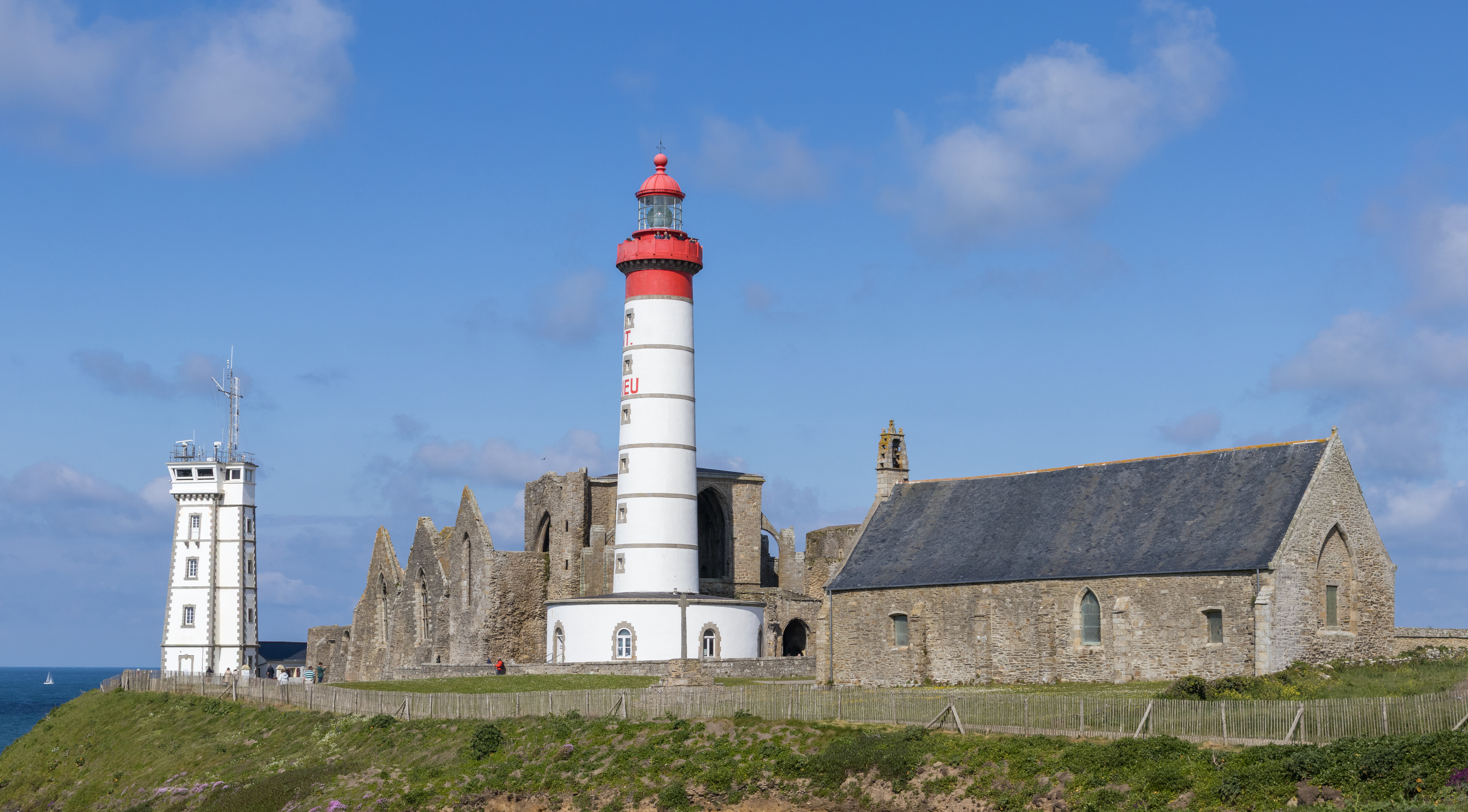
f/8 - ISO 100

f/10 - ISO 100

Lens Canon EF-M 28mm f/3.5 Macro IS STM

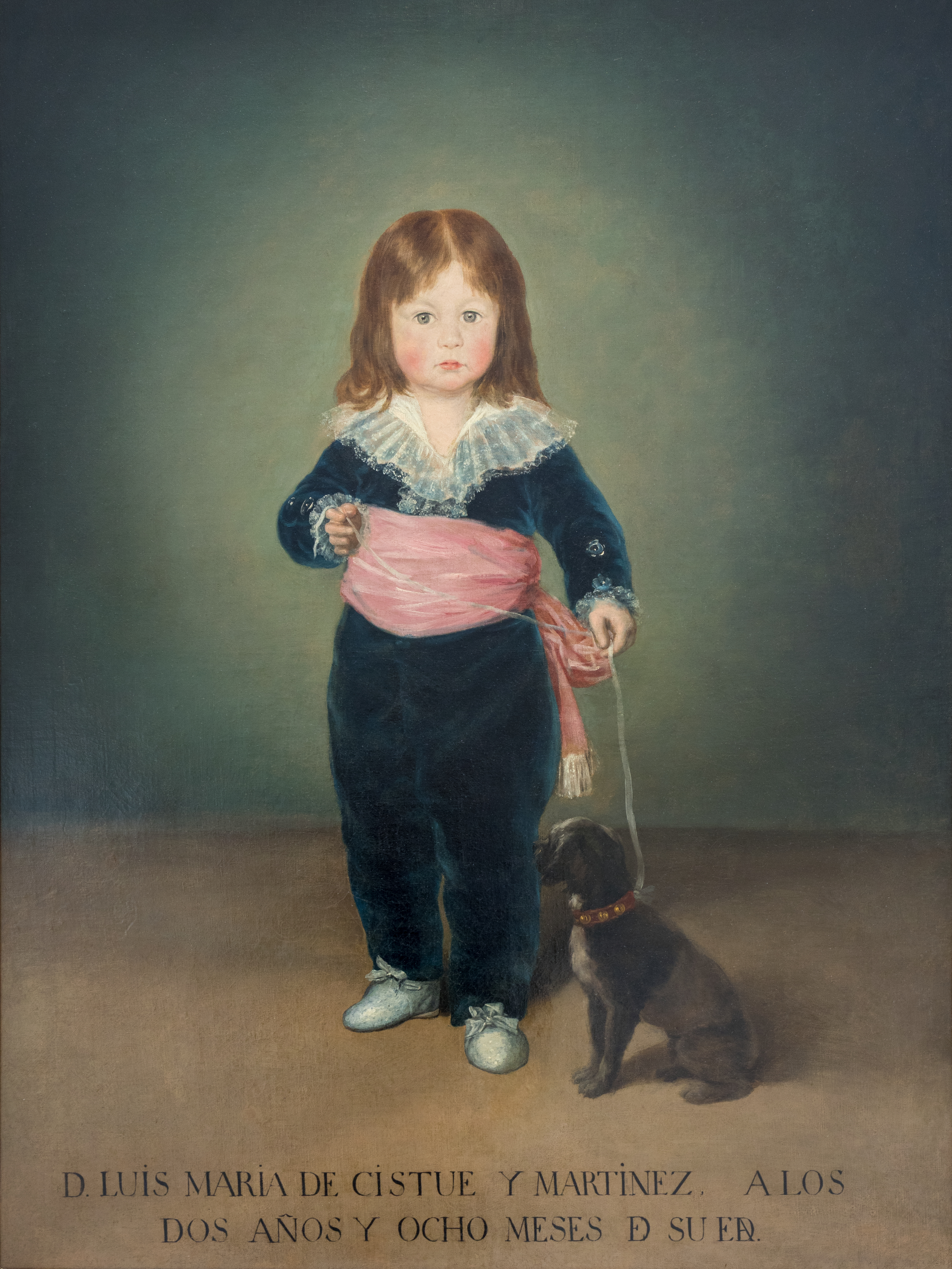
1/8s - f/5,6 - ISO 200

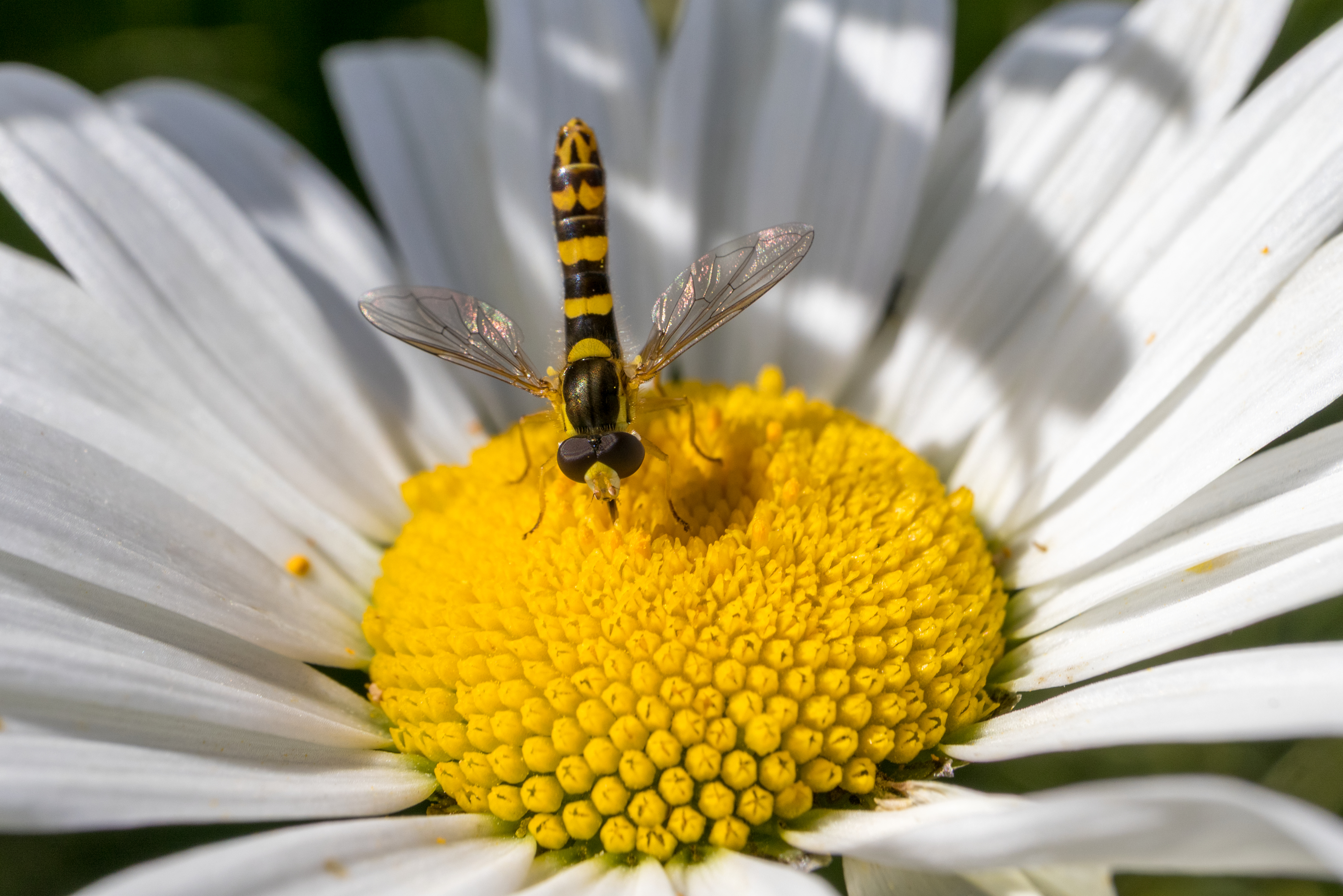
f/10 - ISO 100

f/8 - ISO 100

Lens Canon EF-M 11-22 mm F4.0-5.6 IS STM

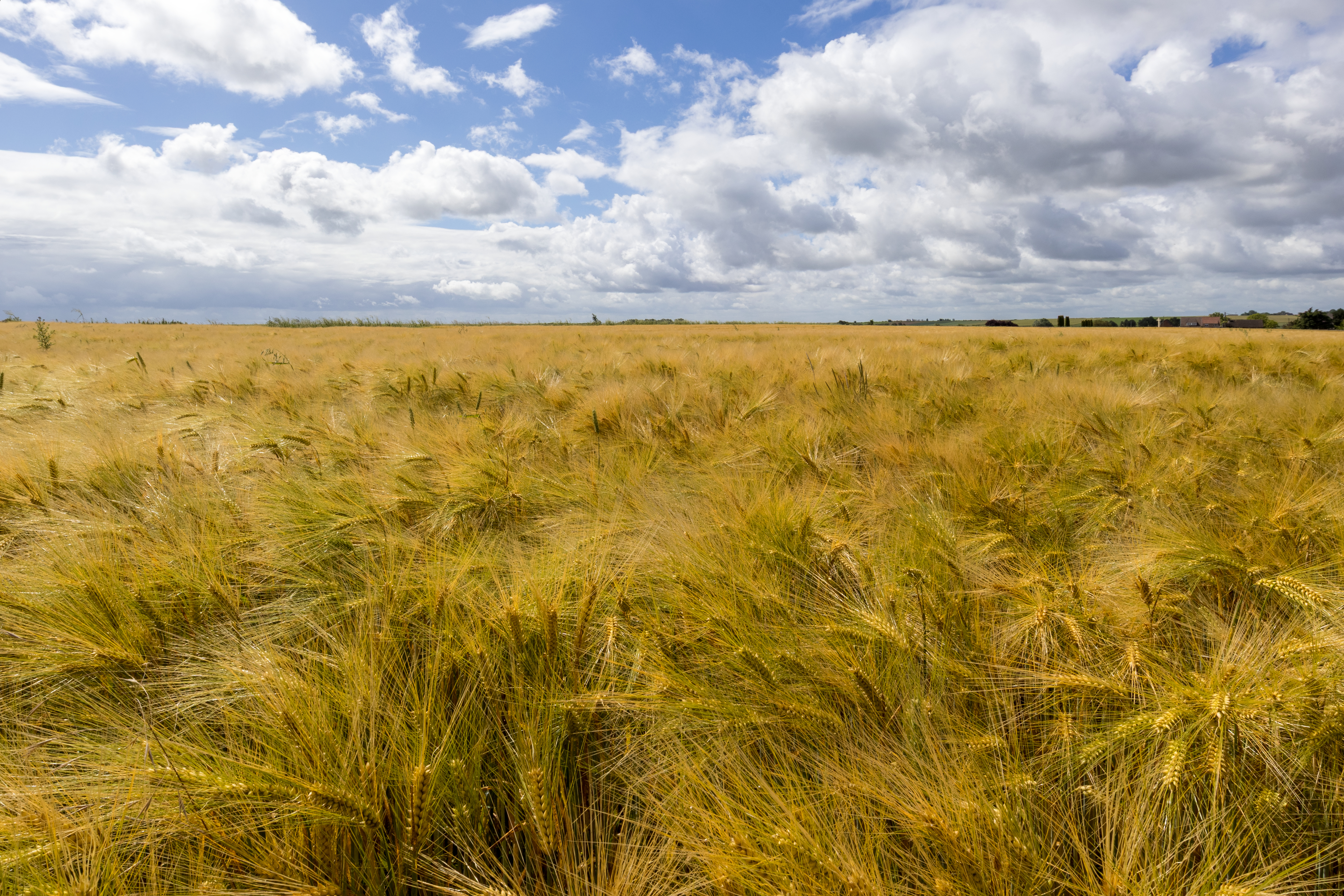
f/11 - ISO 100

f/6,3 - ISO 200

f/10 - ISO 100

Objectif Canon EF-M55-200mm f/4.5-6.3 IS STM

f/7,1 - ISO 100

f/5 - ISO 1000

f/7,1 - ISO 100

Sensor	Class	12	13	14	15	16	17	18	19	20	21	22	23	24	25	26
Full-frame	Flagship														_{m} R1 ^{ATS}	
Full-frame	Professional											_{m} R3 ^{ATS}				
Full-frame	Professional										R5 ^{ATSR}				_{m} R5 Mk II ^{ATSR}	
Full-frame	Professional											_{m} R5 C ^{ATCR}				
Full-frame	Advanced										R6 ^{ATS}		_{m} R6 Mk II ^{ATS}			_{m} R6 Mk III ^{ATS}
Full-frame	Advanced															R6 V ^{ATS}
Full-frame	Advanced									Ra ^{AT}						
Full-frame	Advanced								R ^{AT}							
Full-frame	Midrange													_{m} R8 ^{AT}		_{m} R8 Mk II ^{ATS}
Full-frame	Entry/mid								RP ^{AT}							
APS-C	Advanced												_{m} R7 ^{ATS}			
APS-C	Midrange						M5 ^{FT}						_{m} R10 ^{AT}			
APS-C	Entry/mid		_{x} M ^{T}	M2 ^{T}	M3 ^{FT}			M6 ^{FT}		M6 Mk II ^{FT}						
APS-C	Entry/mid								M50 ^{AT}		M50 Mk II ^{AT}			_{m} R50 ^{AT}		
APS-C	Entry/mid															_{m} R50 V ^{AT}
APS-C	Entry					M10 ^{FT}		M100 ^{FT}		M200 ^{FT}				R100		
Sensor	Class															
Sensor	Class	12	13	14	15	16	17	18	19	20	21	22	23	24	25	26
