= Canon EF-M 22mm lens =

Canon EF-M 22mm f/2 STM
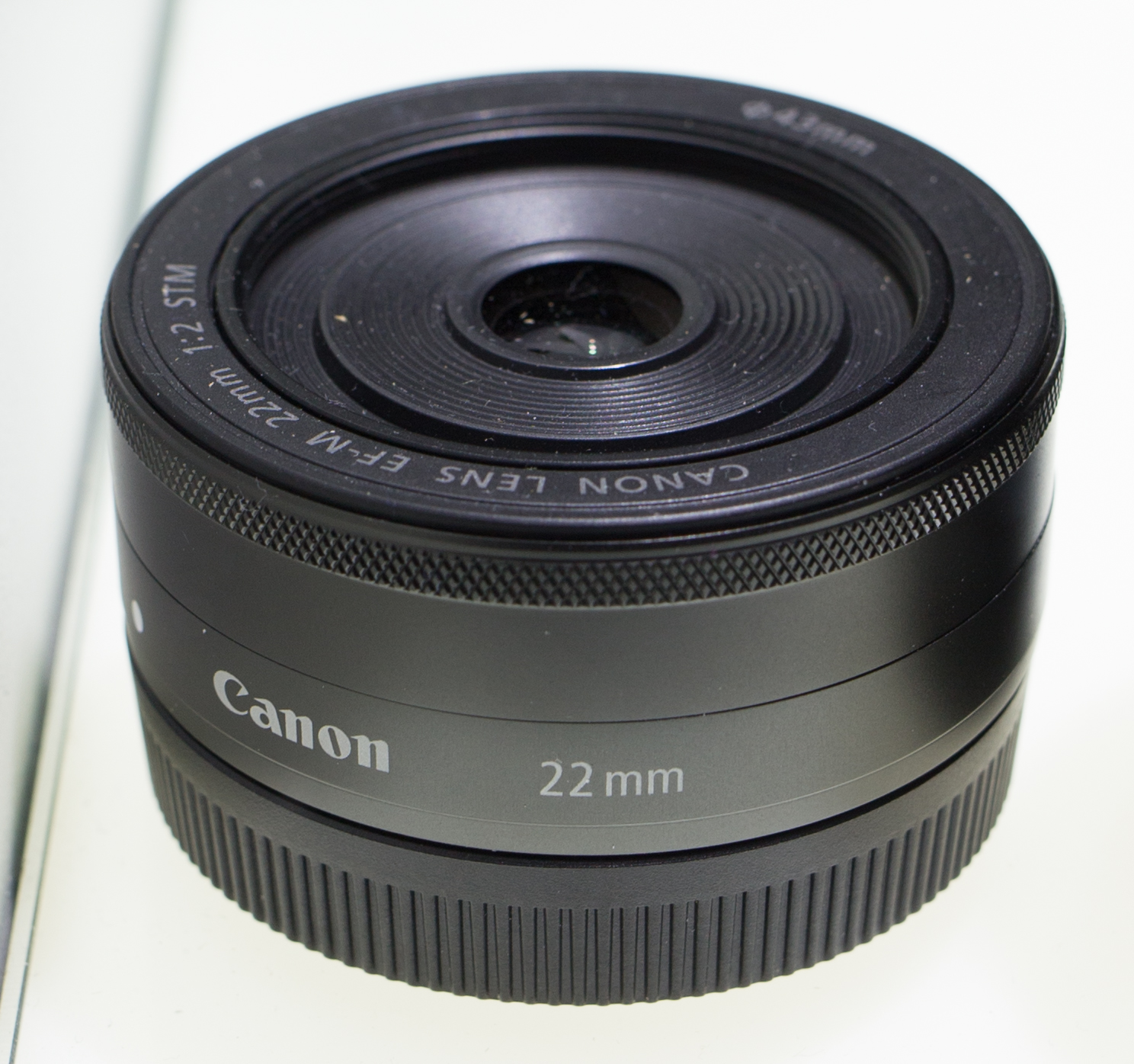
- Maker: Canon
- Lens mount: Canon EF-M

Technical data
- Focus drive: Stepping motor
- Focal length: 22mm
- Focal length (35mm equiv.): 35mm
- Crop factor: 1.6
- Aperture (max/min): f/2.0 / f/22
- Close focus distance: 0.15 metres (0.49 ft)
- Max. magnification: 0.21
- Diaphragm blades: 7
- Construction: 7 elements in 6 groups

Features
- Weather-sealing: No No
- Lens-based stabilization: No No

Physical
- Max. length: 23.7 millimetres (0.93 in)
- Diameter: 60.9 millimetres (2.40 in)
- Weight: 105 grams (0.231 lb)
- Filter diameter: 43mm

Accessories
- Lens hood: EW-43
- Case: LP811

Angle of view
- Horizontal: 54° 30′
- Vertical: 37° 50′
- Diagonal: 63° 30′

History
- Introduction: 2012

Retail info
- MSRP: 249,00 € (as of July 2015)

The Canon EF-M 22mm f/2 STM is an interchangeable wide-angle lens announced by Canon on July 23, 2012. It was not available from Canon USA until the 27th of August 2015, but it was available as part of a kit with the EOS M in 2012.

As a pancake lens, it is the physically shortest Canon lens available on the EF-M mount. Its 22mm focal length has the same field of view on an EOS M-series camera as a 35mm lens on a full-frame camera.
