= Canon EF-M 28mm Macro lens =

Macro lens by Canon Inc.

Canon EF-M 28mm f/3.5 Macro IS STM
- Maker: Canon
- Lens mount: Canon EF-M

Technical data
- Focus drive: Stepping motor
- Focal length: 28 mm
- Focal length (35mm equiv.): 45 mm
- Crop factor: 1.6
- Aperture (max/min): f/3.5 / f/22
- Close focus distance: Normal mode 97 mm (3.8 in), Super Macro mode 93 mm (3.7 in)
- Max. magnification: 1× in Normal Mode and 1.2× in Super Macro Mode
- Diaphragm blades: 7
- Construction: 11 elements in 10 groups

Features
- Lens-based stabilization: Yes Yes
- Macro capable: Yes Yes
- Unique features: Integrated light

Physical
- Max. length: 45.5 mm (1.79 in)
- Diameter: 60.9 mm (2.40 in)
- Weight: 130 g (4.6 oz)
- Filter diameter: 43 mm (attaches to hood)

Accessories
- Lens hood: ES-22 (part of the delivery)
- Case: LP811

Angle of view
- Horizontal: 44° 10'
- Vertical: 30° 10'
- Diagonal: 51° 55'

History
- Introduction: 2016

Retail info
- MSRP: 299.99 € (as of June 2016)

The Canon EF-M 28mm f/3.5 Macro IS STM lens is an interchangeable Macro lens announced by Canon in May 11, 2016. The maximum magnification of this Macro lens is 1× in Normal mode and 1.2× in Super Macro mode. It is the first Canon lens with integrated macro light and uses the Hybrid IS.

== Technical information ==
The Canon EF-M 28mm f/3.5 Macro IS STM the first wide angle Macro lens in the Canon lineup. It has an integrated ring light, which is useful for macro photography. It can be use as ring light or as left / right light. The macro light is hidden if the lens hood is in place. The minimum focus distance is 97 mm and 93 mm at the super macro mode (1.2×).

== Photographs taken with a Canon EOS M50m2 ==
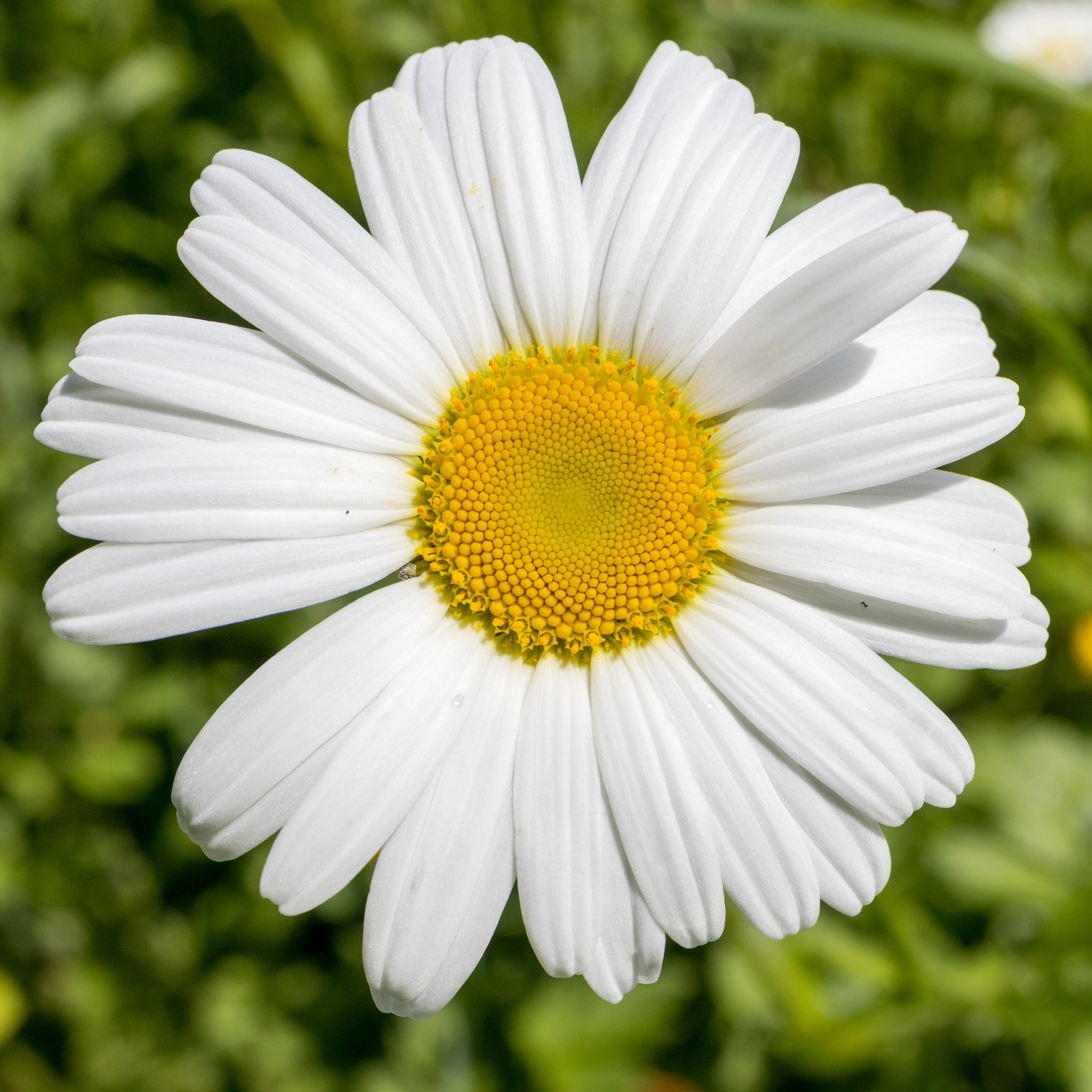
