= Canon EF-M 11–22mm lens =

Wide-angle lens for Canon EOS M cameras

Canon EF-M 11-22mm f/4-5.6 IS STM
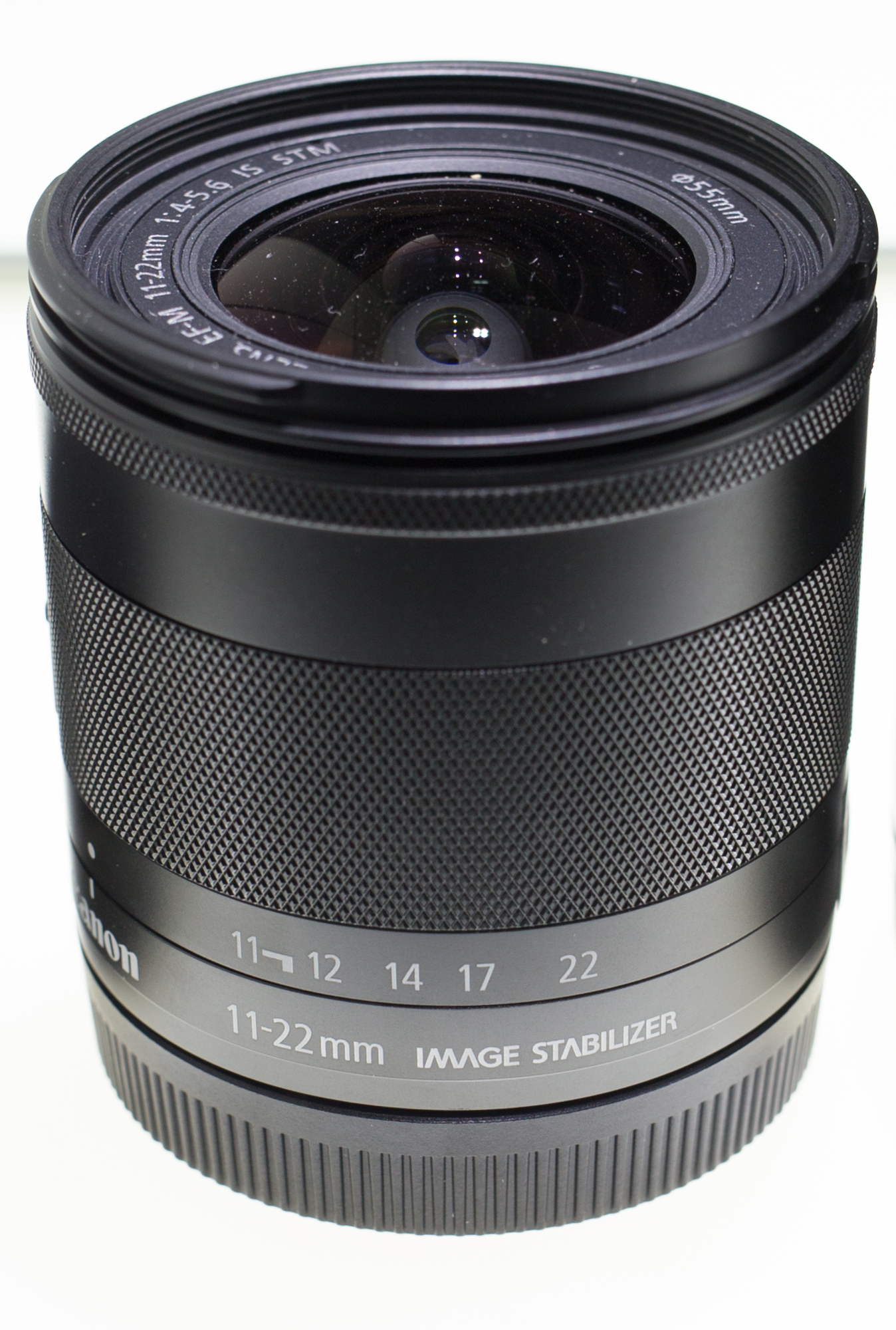
- Maker: Canon Inc.
- Lens mount: Canon EF-M

Technical data
- Type: Zoom
- Focus drive: Stepping motor
- Focal length: 11-22mm
- Focal length (35mm equiv.): 18-35mm
- Crop factor: 1.6
- Aperture (max/min): f/4-5.6 / f/22 - 32 (at 1/3 steps)
- Close focus distance: 0.15 metres (0.49 ft)
- Max. magnification: 0.3
- Diaphragm blades: 7
- Construction: 12 elements in 9 groups

Features
- Weather-sealing: No No
- Lens-based stabilization: Yes Yes

Physical
- Max. length: 58.2 millimetres (2.29 in)
- Diameter: 60.9 millimetres (2.40 in)
- Weight: 220 grams (0.49 lb)
- Filter diameter: 55mm

Accessories
- Lens hood: EW-60E
- Case: LP814

Angle of view
- Horizontal: 91°50′–54°30′
- Vertical: 68°55′–37°50′
- Diagonal: 102°10′–63°30′

History
- Introduction: 2013

Retail info
- MSRP: 399,00 € (as of July 2015)

The Canon EF-M 11-22mm f/4-5.6 IS STM is an interchangeable wide angle lens for the Canon EOS M system of mirrorless cameras. It was announced by Canon Inc. on June 6, 2013. This lens not available from Canon USA until 2015.

Photographs taken with a Canon EOS M50m2

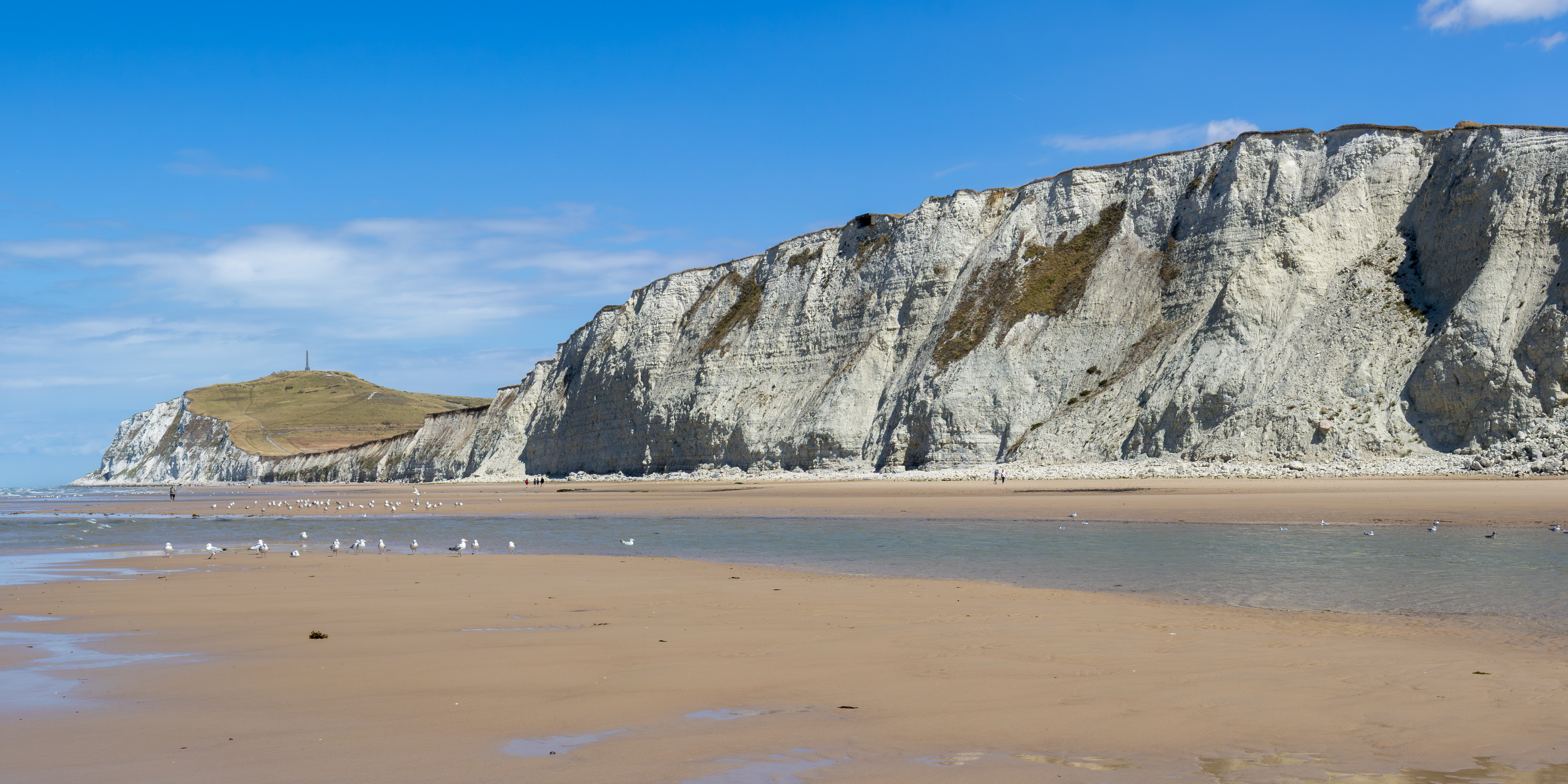

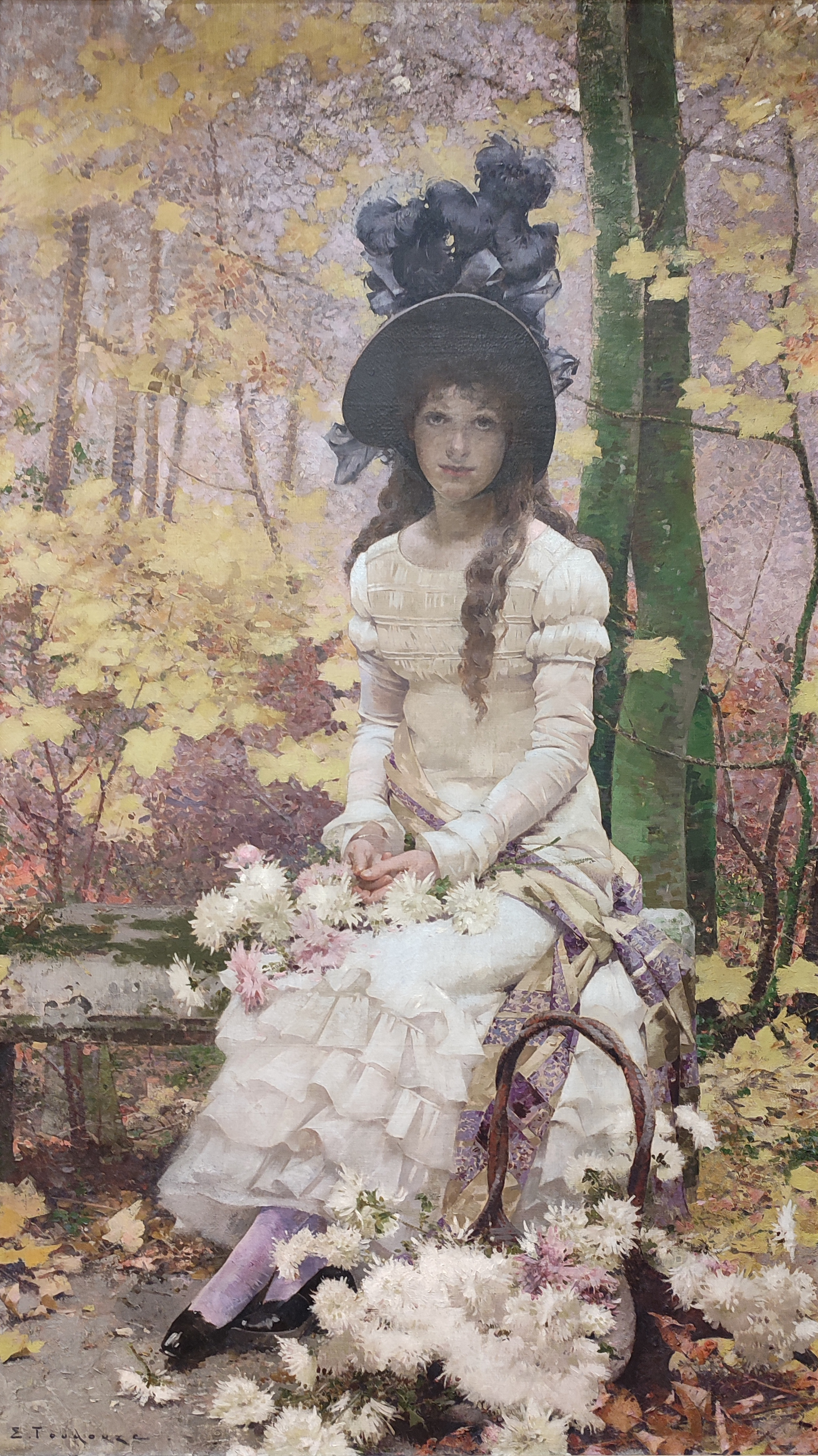
