= Canon EF-M 55-200mm lens =

Canon EF-M 55-200mm f/4.5-6.3 IS STM
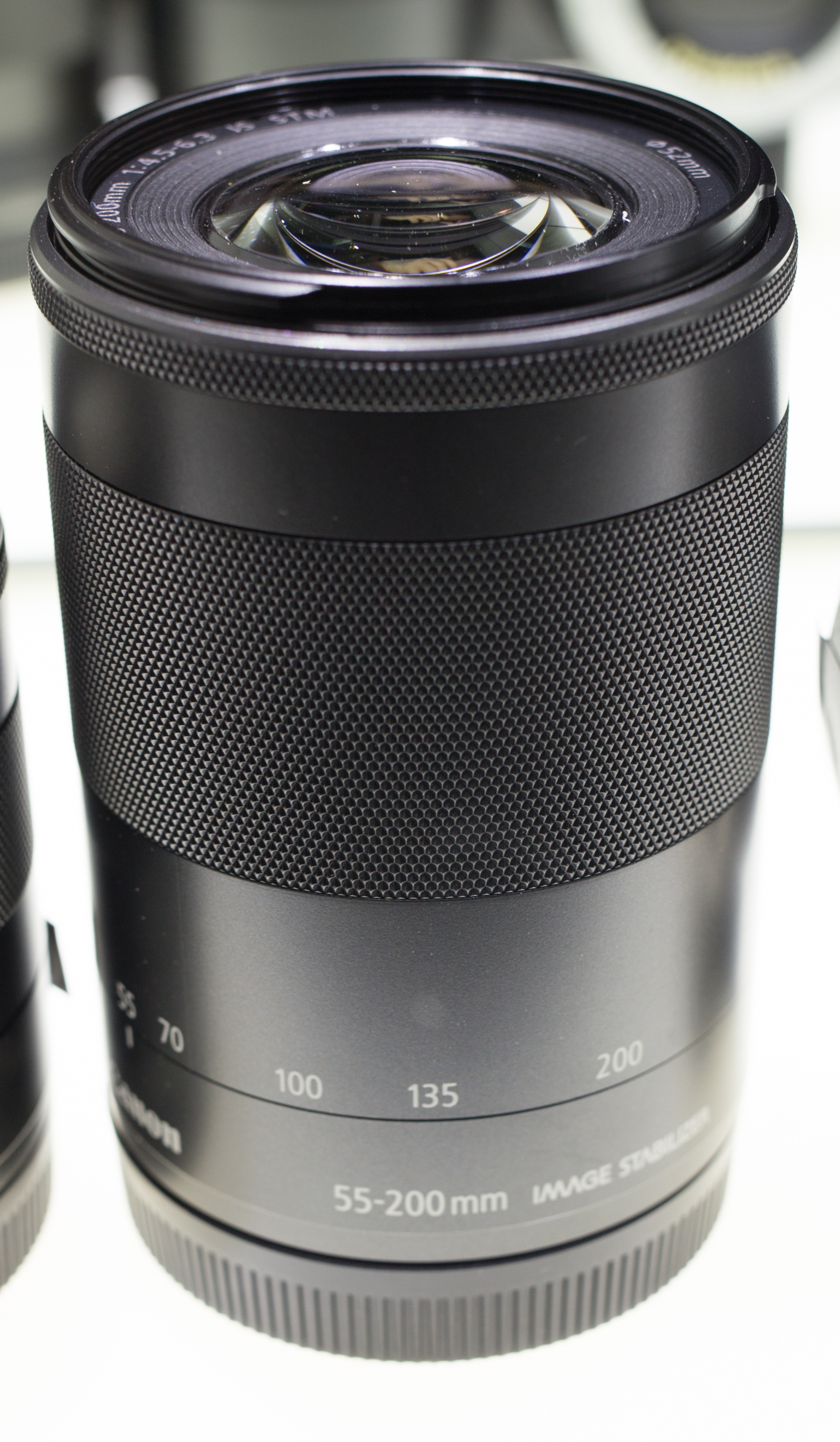
- Maker: Canon
- Lens mount: Canon EF-M

Technical data
- Type: Zoom
- Focus drive: Stepping motor
- Focal length: 55-200mm
- Focal length (35mm equiv.): 88-320mm
- Crop factor: 1.6
- Aperture (max/min): f/4.5-6.3 / f/22-32 (at 1/3 steps)
- Close focus distance: 1.00 metre (3.28 ft)
- Max. magnification: 0.21
- Diaphragm blades: 7
- Construction: 17 elements in 11 groups

Features
- Weather-sealing: No No
- Lens-based stabilization: Yes Yes

Physical
- Max. length: 86.5 millimetres (3.41 in)
- Diameter: 60.9 millimetres (2.40 in)
- Weight: 260 grams (0.57 lb)
- Filter diameter: 52mm

Accessories
- Lens hood: ET-54B
- Case: LP816

Angle of view
- Horizontal: 23°20′ - 6°30′
- Vertical: 15°40′ - 4°20′
- Diagonal: 27°50′ - 7°50′

History
- Introduction: 2014
- Discontinuation: 2023

Retail info
- MSRP: 329,00 € (as of July 2015)

The Canon EF-M 55-200mm f/4.5-6.3 IS STM is an interchangeable telezoom lens for the Canon EOS M system of mirrorless cameras. It was announced by Canon on June 17, 2014.

This lens was not initially available from Canon USA, but became available in the US market during October 2015.
