= BYD M6 (2010) =

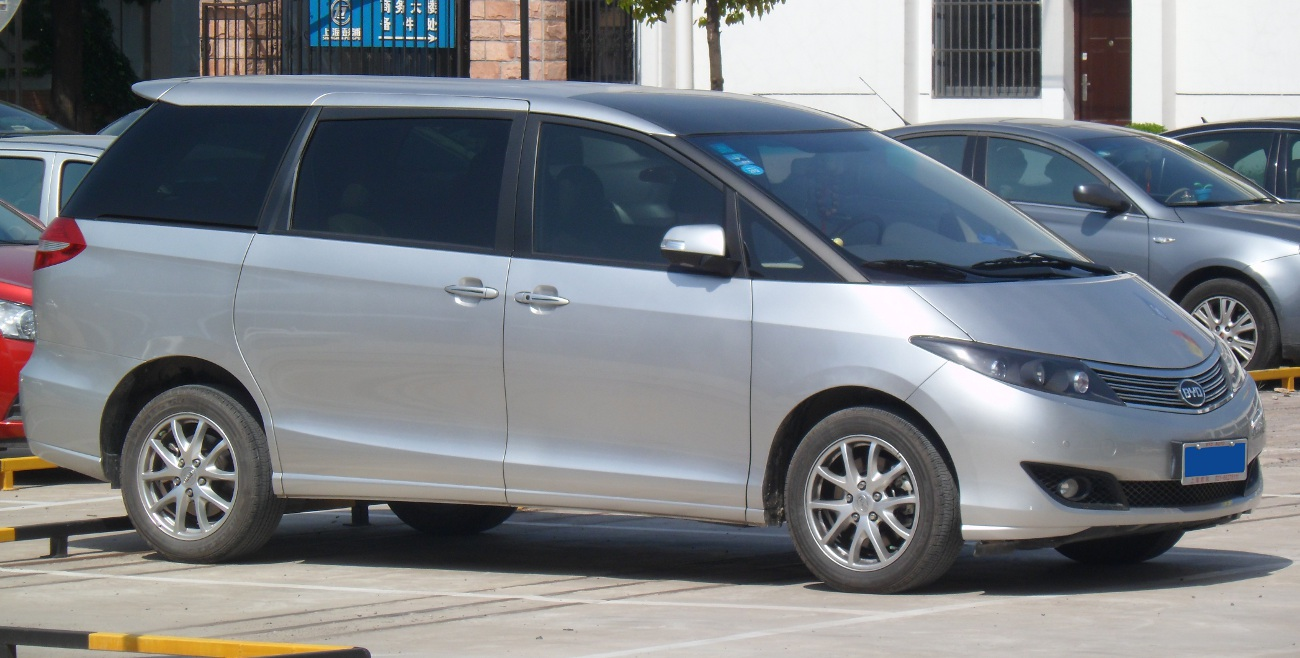

Overview
- Manufacturer: BYD Auto
- Production: 2010–2017
- Assembly: China

Body and chassis
- Class: Multi-purpose vehicle
- Body style: Minivan
- Related: BYD e6

Powertrain
- Engine: 2.0 L BYD483QB I4 (petrol); 2.4 L BYD488QA I4 (petrol); 2.4 L 4G69 I4 (petrol)
- Transmission: 5-speed manual 6-speed automatic 4-speed automatic

Dimensions
- Wheelbase: 2,960 mm (116.5 in)
- Length: 4,820 mm (189.8 in)
- Width: 1,810 mm (71.3 in)
- Height: 1,765 mm (69.5 in)
- Curb weight: 1,710–1,760 kg (3,770–3,880 lb)

Chronology
- Successor: BYD Song Max

The BYD M6 is a seven-seater MPV produced by Chinese car maker BYD between 2010 and 2017. Its design was known to be heavily inspired by the Toyota Previa/Estima.

A minor facelift was later introduced in 2013 featuring clear headlamps replacing the smoked headlamps of the pre-facelift model.

== History ==
Officially introduced during the 2010 Beijing Auto Show, the MPV has two engines, consisting of either the indigenous 2.0 liter engine from the BYD483 series for 138 horsepower 6,000 rpm and 186 N⋅m (137 lb⋅ft) of torque between 4,000 and 4,500 rpm or the Mitsubishi-based 4G69 2.4 liter engine producing 162 horsepower between 5,000 and 6,000 rpm and 220 N⋅m (162 lb⋅ft) of torque between 3500 and 4500rpm.

== Gallery ==
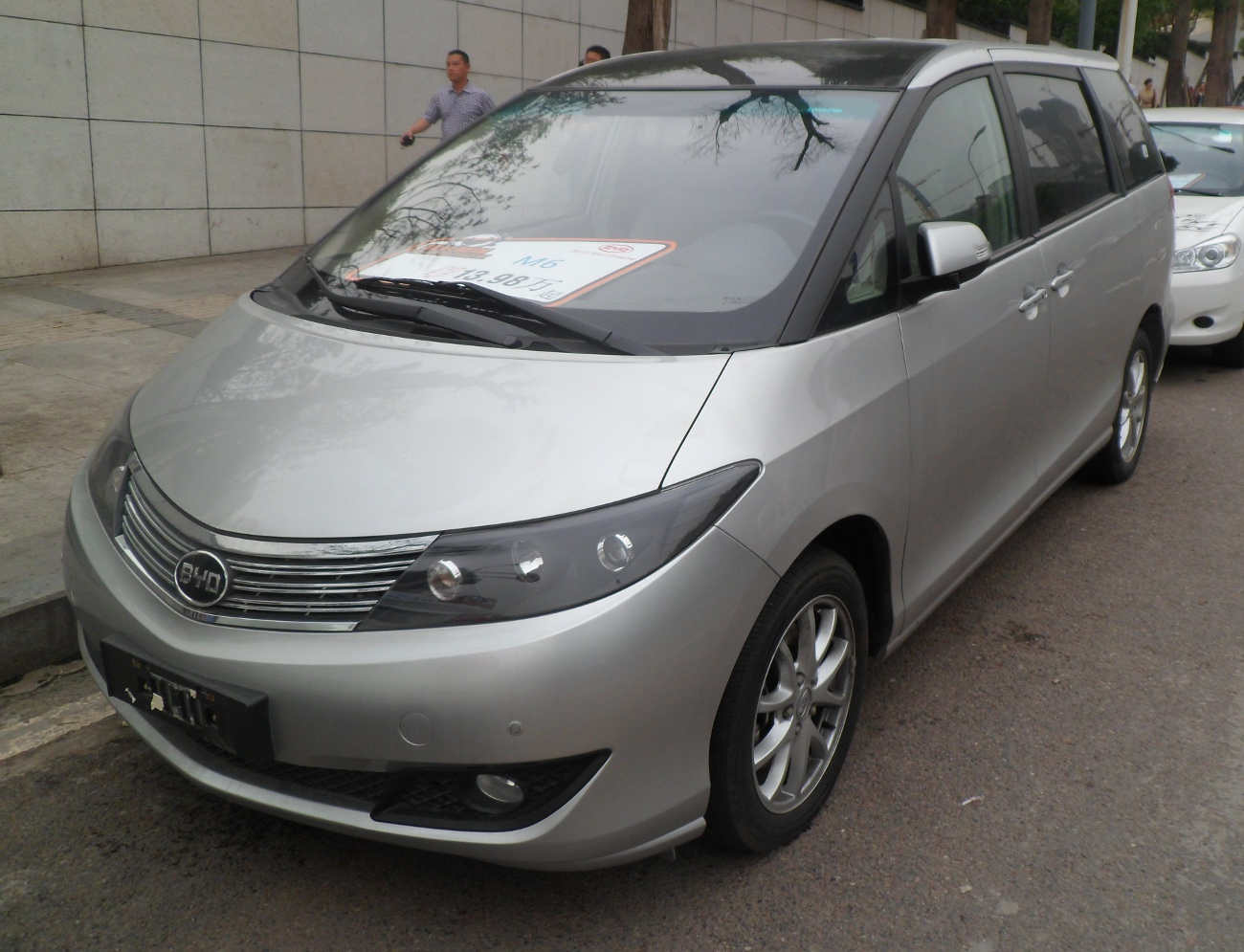
Prefacelift BYD M6 front.

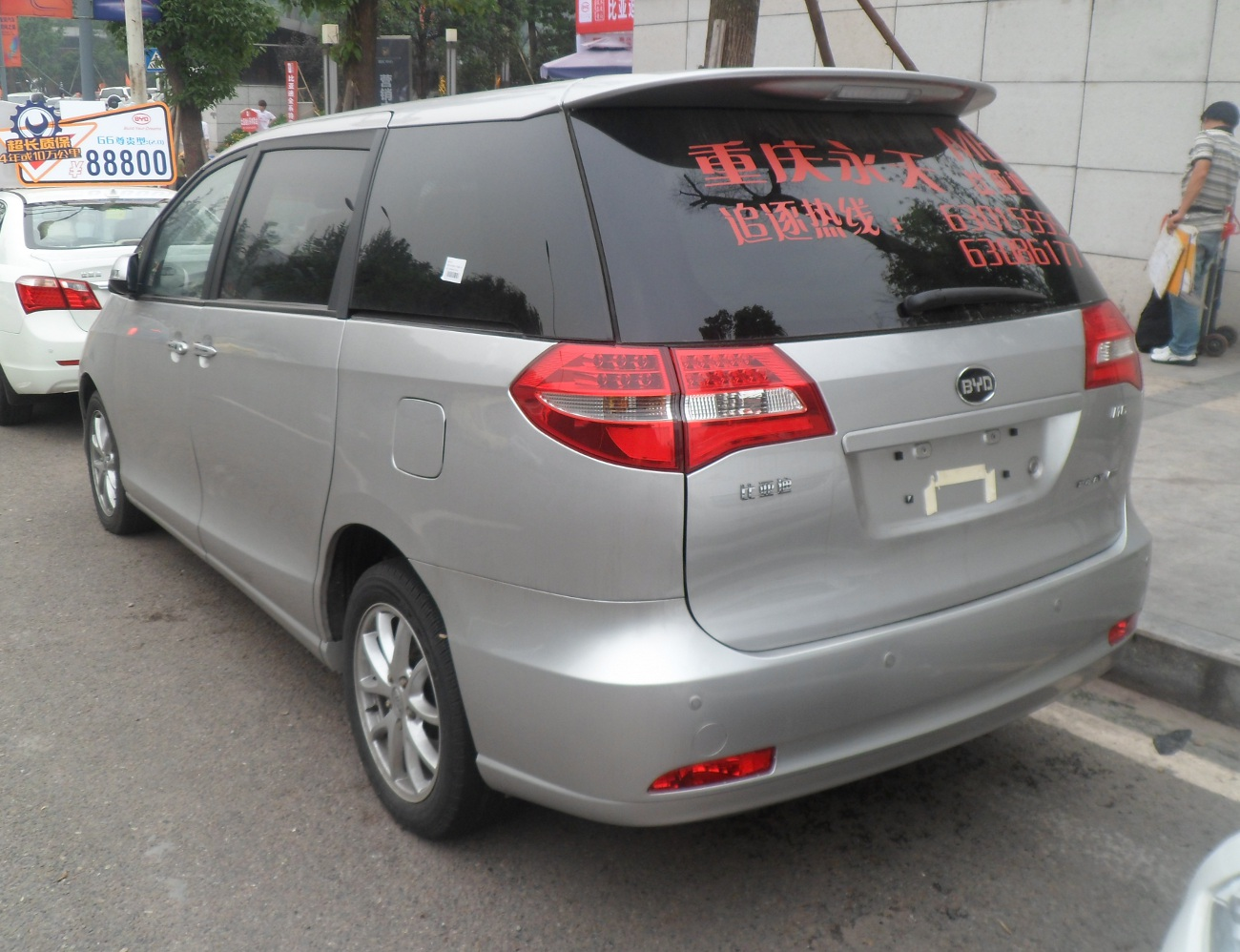
Prefacelift BYD M6 rear.

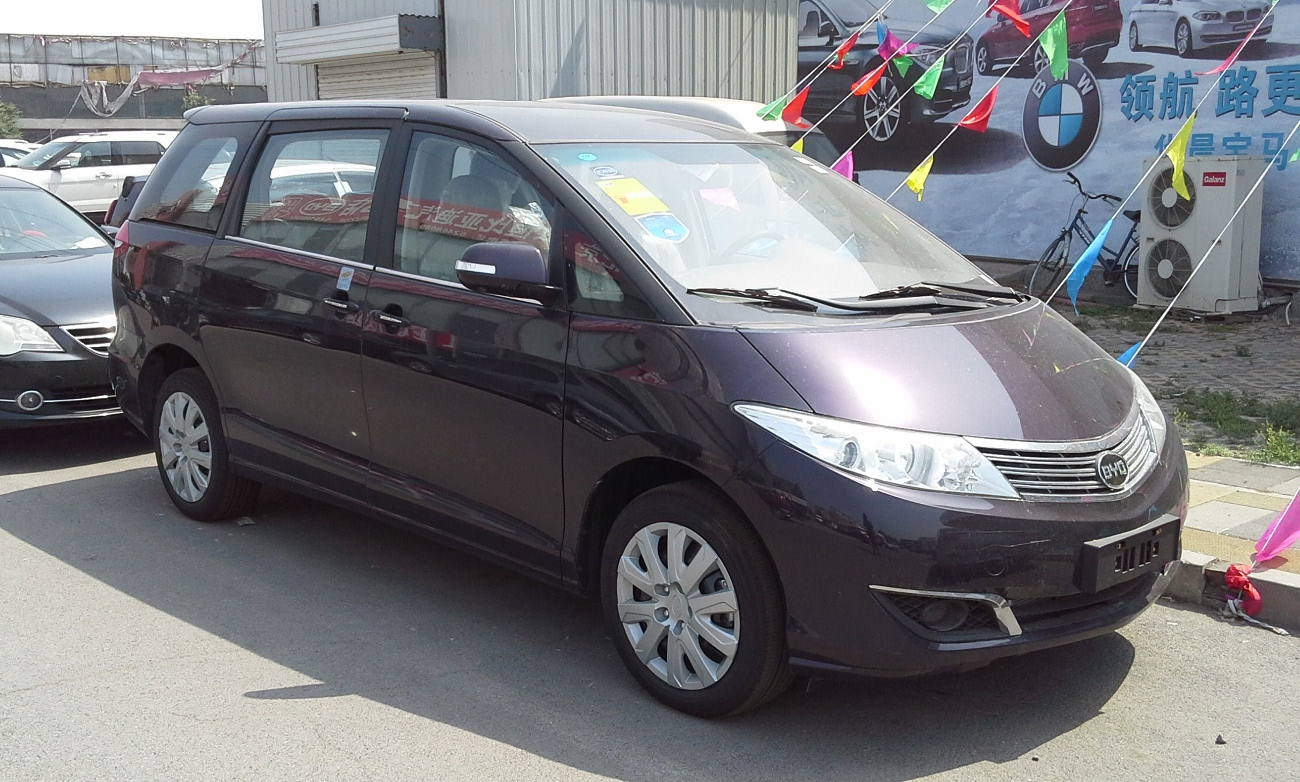
BYD M6 facelift front.

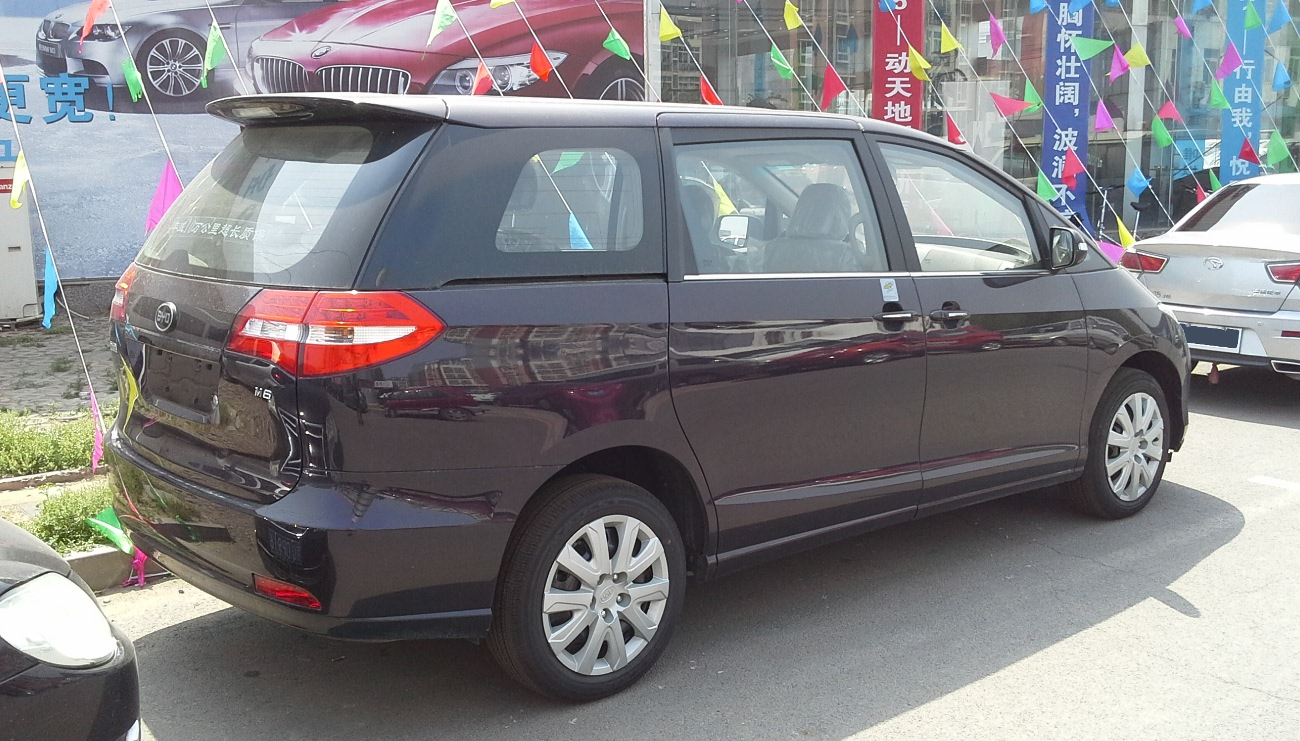
BYD M6 facelift rear.
