= BYD Song Max =

Compact MPV

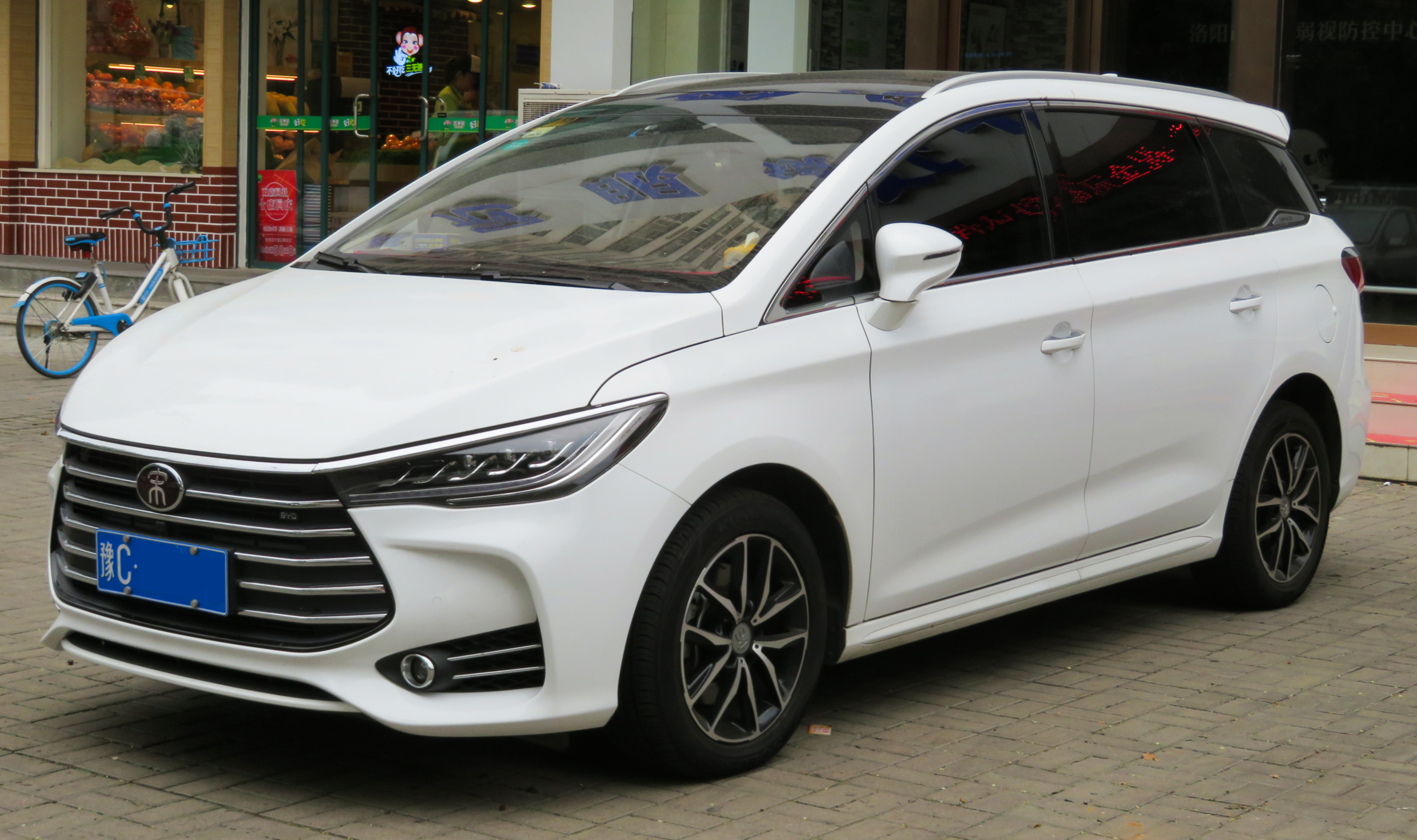

Overview
- Manufacturer: BYD Auto
- Model code: MEF (petrol); MEH (DM-i); MEE (EV)
- Also called: BYD M6 (2024–present); BYD eMax 7 (EV, India and the Philippines; 2024–present)
- Production: 2017–2024 (Song Max); 2024–present (M6 / eMax 7)
- Assembly: China: Changsha, Hunan (Song Max); Shenzhen, Guangdong (M6 / eMax 7); Indonesia: Subang, West Java (BYD Auto Indonesia, 2026–present)
- Designer: Under the lead of Wolfgang Egger

Body and chassis
- Class: Compact MPV
- Body style: 5-door MPV
- Layout: Front-engine, front-wheel-drive; Front-engine, front-motor, front-wheel drive (DM-i); Front-motor, front-wheel-drive (EV)
- Platform: e-Platform 3.0 (EV)
- Related: BYD e6 (second generation)

Powertrain
- Engine: Petrol: 1.5 L BYD476ZQB I4 turbo (2017–2021); Petrol plug-in hybrid: 1.5 L BYD472QA/BYD476ZQB I4 (DM, 2019–2022); 1.5 L BYD472QA I4 (DM-i, 2022–2024); 1.5 L BYD472QD I4 (DM-i, 2026–present)
- Electric motor: Permanent magnet synchronous
- Power output: Petrol: 152–158 hp (154–160 PS; 113–118 kW) (2017–2022); PHEV: 299–306 hp (303–310 PS; 223–228 kW) (2019–2021); 286–303 hp (290–307 PS; 213–226 kW) (2022–2024); EV: 161 hp (163 PS; 120 kW) (Song Max EV/M6 Standard range); 201 hp (204 PS; 150 kW) (M6 Extended range)
- Transmission: 6-speed manual; 6-speed DCT; E-CVT (DM-i); 1-speed Automatic transmission (BEV)
- Hybrid drivetrain: Plug-in hybrid (DM/DM-i)
- Battery: 8.3–18.3 kWh BYD Blade LFP (DM-i); 59.1 kWh BYD Blade LFP (Song Max EV 163); 55.4 kWh BYD Blade LFP (M6 Standard Range); 58 kWh BYD Blade LFP (M6 Standard Range, Indonesia); 71.8 kWh BYD Blade LFP (M6 Extended Range)
- Range: 51 km (32 mi) (9.98 kWh DM-i); 81 km (50 mi) (15.98 kWh DM-i); 51 km (32 mi) (9.98 kWh DM-i); Maximum 530 km (329.3 mi) (M6)
- Plug-in charging: AC: 7.0 kW; DC: 89 kW (55.4 kWh, M6); 115 kW (71.8 kWh, M6); 26 kW (18.3 kWh, DM-i)

Dimensions
- Wheelbase: 2,785 mm (109.6 in)
- Length: 4,680–4,710 mm (184.3–185.4 in)
- Width: 1,810 mm (71.3 in)
- Height: 1,680–1,690 mm (66.1–66.5 in); 1,880 mm (74.0 in) (with optional extended roof)
- Kerb weight: 1,800–1,915 kg (3,968–4,222 lb) (M6)

Chronology
- Predecessor: BYD M6 (2010)

The BYD Song Max (Chinese: 比亚迪宋MAX) is a compact multi purpose vehicle (MPV) developed by BYD since 2017. Initially available solely as an internal combustion engine (ICE) vehicle with a 1.5-litre turbocharged petrol engine, BYD introduced the plug-in hybrid and battery electric versions since 2019. In 2022, BYD discontinued the petrol-powered Song Max and replaced it with the plug-in hybrid Song Max DM-i after it ended production of ICE vehicles.

The second-generation BYD e6 is a battery electric vehicle heavily based on the Song Max that is predominantly sold as taxis and other fleet usage, which is sold since 2021 in China and in right-hand drive export markets such as Singapore, Hong Kong, Australia and India. A more upscale version of the e6, borrowing elements from the newer Song Max with design revisions and a more powerful electric motor has been available as the BYD M6 since 2024 for export markets.

== Overview ==
BYD released previewed images of the BYD Song Max in April 2017. In September 2017, the Song Max was launched in China. Only one engine was offered at launch, which is a 1.5-litre turbocharged petrol engine capable of producing 156 hp (116 kW) and 240 N⋅m (177 lb⋅ft) of torque with either a 6-speed manual gearbox or a 6-speed DCT gearbox.

In April 2019, BYD introduced the Song Max DM plug-in hybrid during the 2019 Shanghai Auto Show. The Song Max DM is equipped with a 1.5-liter petrol engine producing 118 kW (160 PS; 158 hp) an electric motor producing 110 kW (150 PS; 150 hp). At the same show, BYD also showcased the Song Max EV. It was sold in limited quantity in Beijing since October 2019 as the Song Max EV Zhixing Limited Edition. It has a maximum power output of 120 kW (160 PS; 160 hp) and 280 N⋅m (28.6 kg⋅m; 207 lb⋅ft) of torque.

The related fleet-oriented BEV model second-generation BYD e6 was made available in late 2021 in both left-hand drive and right-hand drive formats.

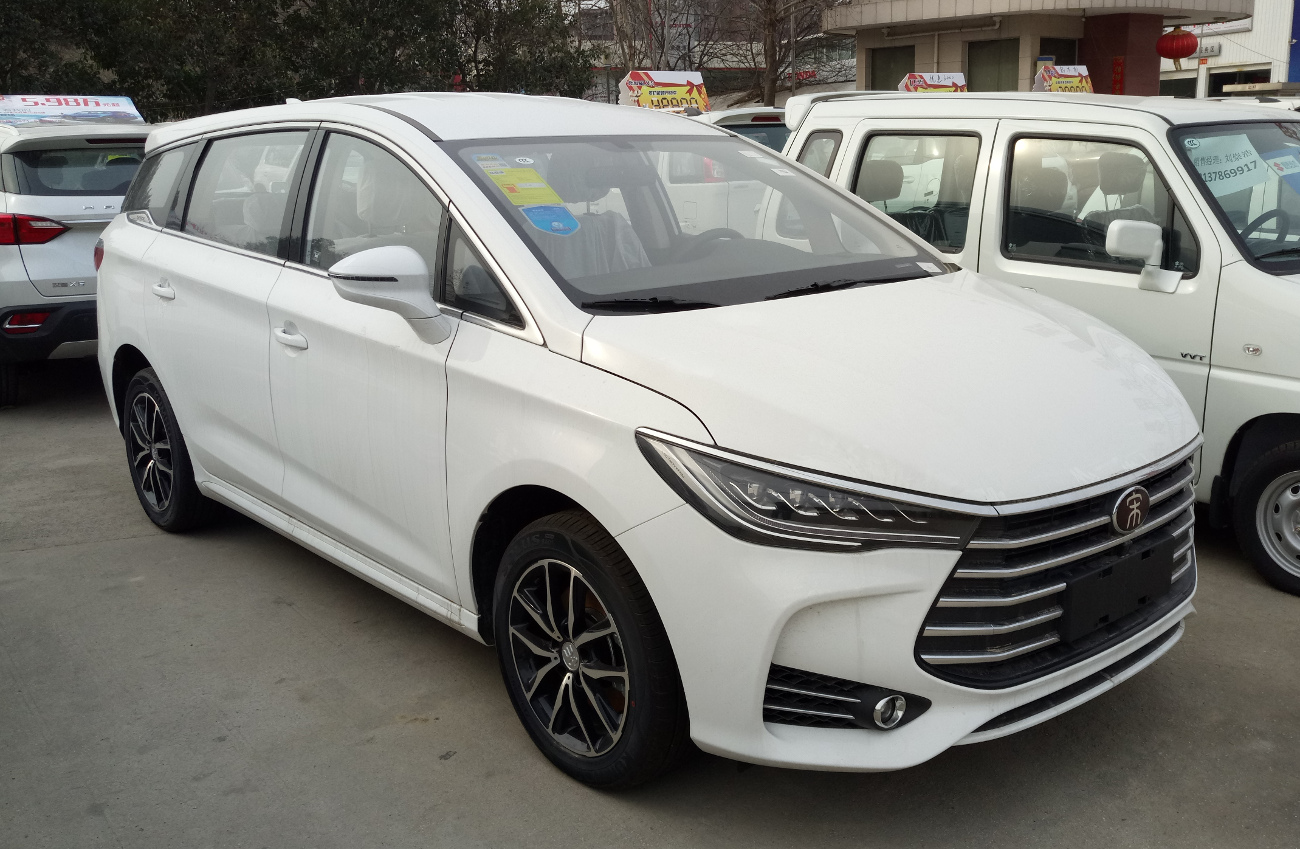
Song Max (ICE)

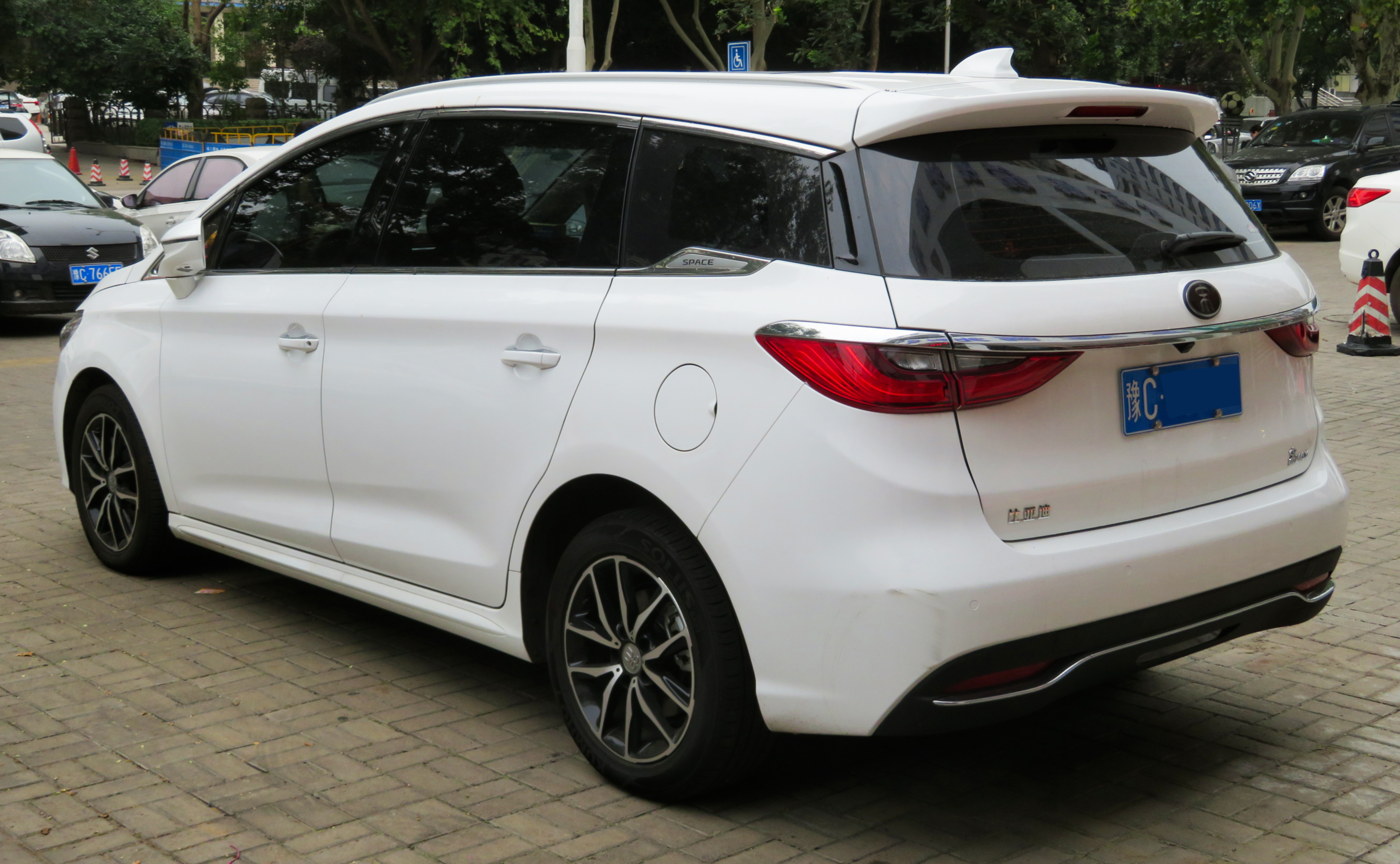
Rear view

=== 2021 facelift ===
The Song Max received a facelift in August 2020 for the 2021 model year. The facelift includes a minor restyle for the front bumper and a redesigned rear end. The interior update features a 12.8 inch screen in the center console and 6-seater 2+2+2 configurations and 7-seater 2+3+2 configurations. The updated model is powered by a 1.5-litre turbo inline-4 engine producing a maximum output of 110 kW (148 hp; 150 PS) and 245 N⋅m (25.0 kg⋅m; 181 lb⋅ft). The transmission is a 6-speed DCT gearbox. BYD ended the production of ICE model in March 2022.

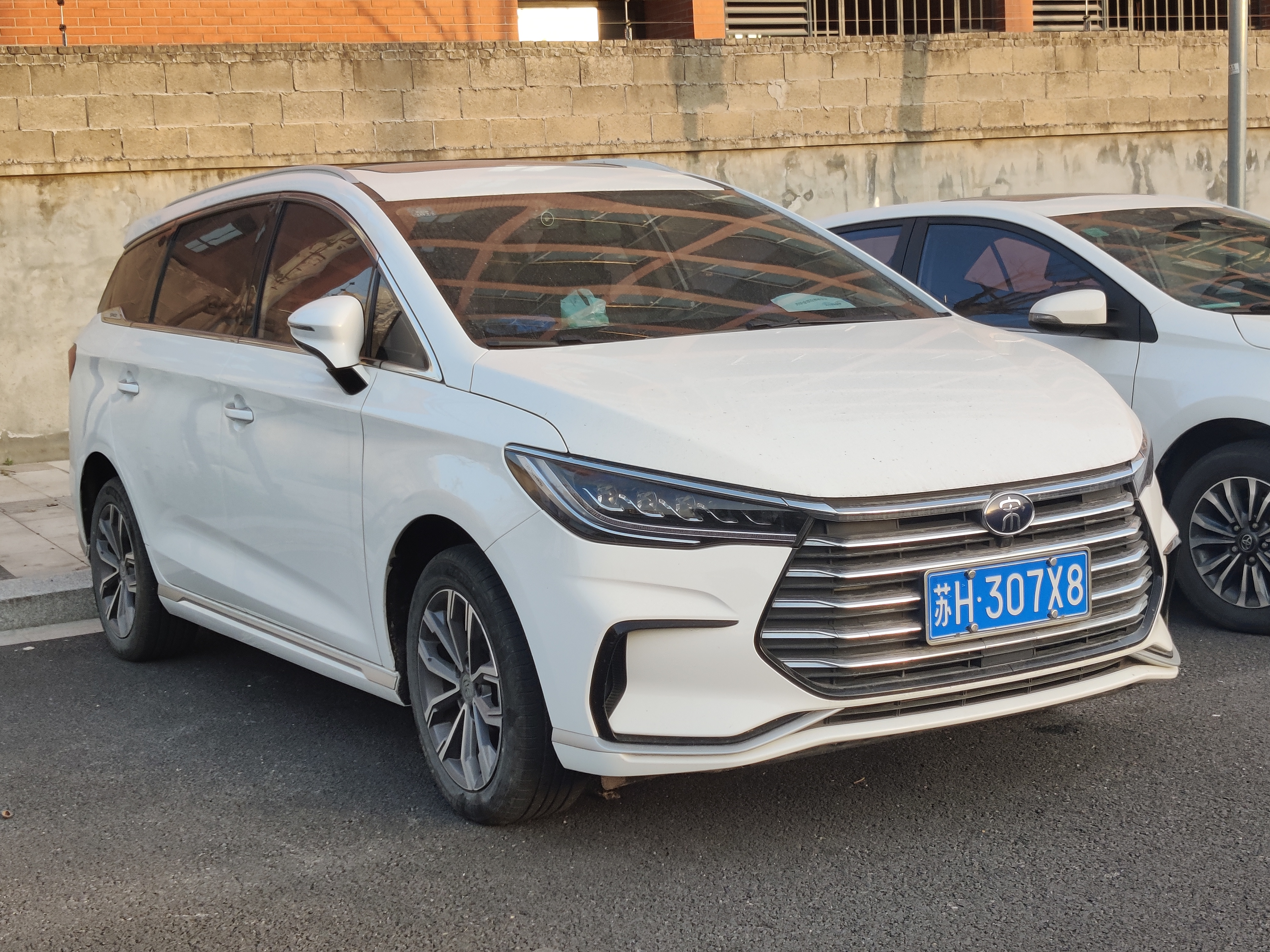
2021 Song Max facelift (ICE)

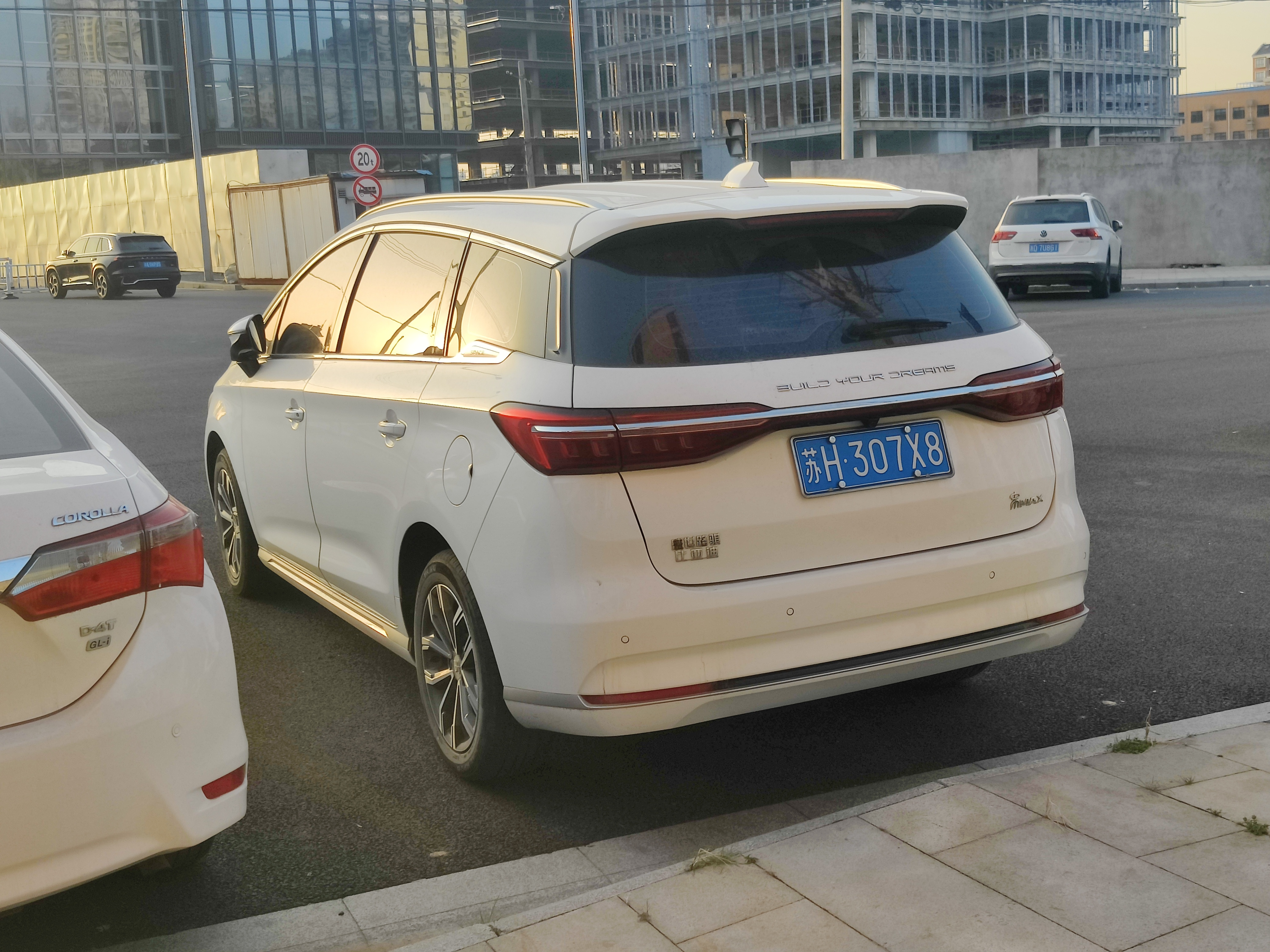
Rear

== Song Max DM-i ==
The Song Max DM-i is the updated version of the previous Song Max DM for the 2022 model year. The Song Max DM-i is equipped with the more efficiency-oriented DM-i plug-in hybrid system consisting of a 1.5-litre engine plus electric motor, with extended roof models added. The Song Max DM-i has 6-seater and 7-seater models to choose from, among which the extended roof models are all 6-seater. With the extended roof, the Song Max DM-i is as high as 1880mm adding the extra height to the interior space. The 1.5-litre engine from the DM-i setup is code-named BYD472QA, drops the turbocharger and produces a maximum power of 81 kW (109 hp; 110 PS), and the permanent magnet synchronous electric motor model is TZ220XYE, powered by lithium iron phosphate batteries. The combined power of the BYD Song Max DM-i reaches 145 kW (194 hp; 197 PS).

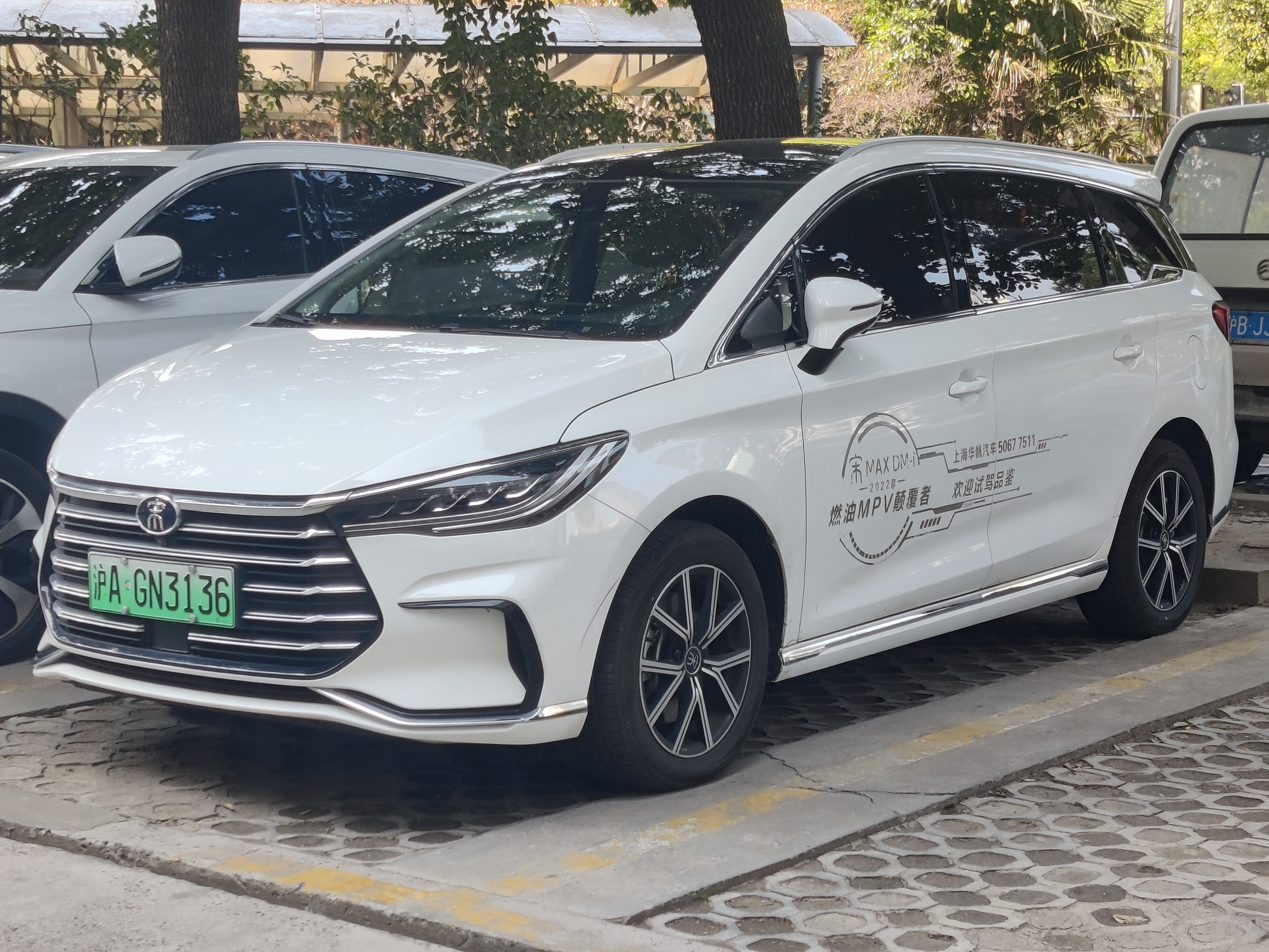
2022 Song Max DM-i (PHEV)

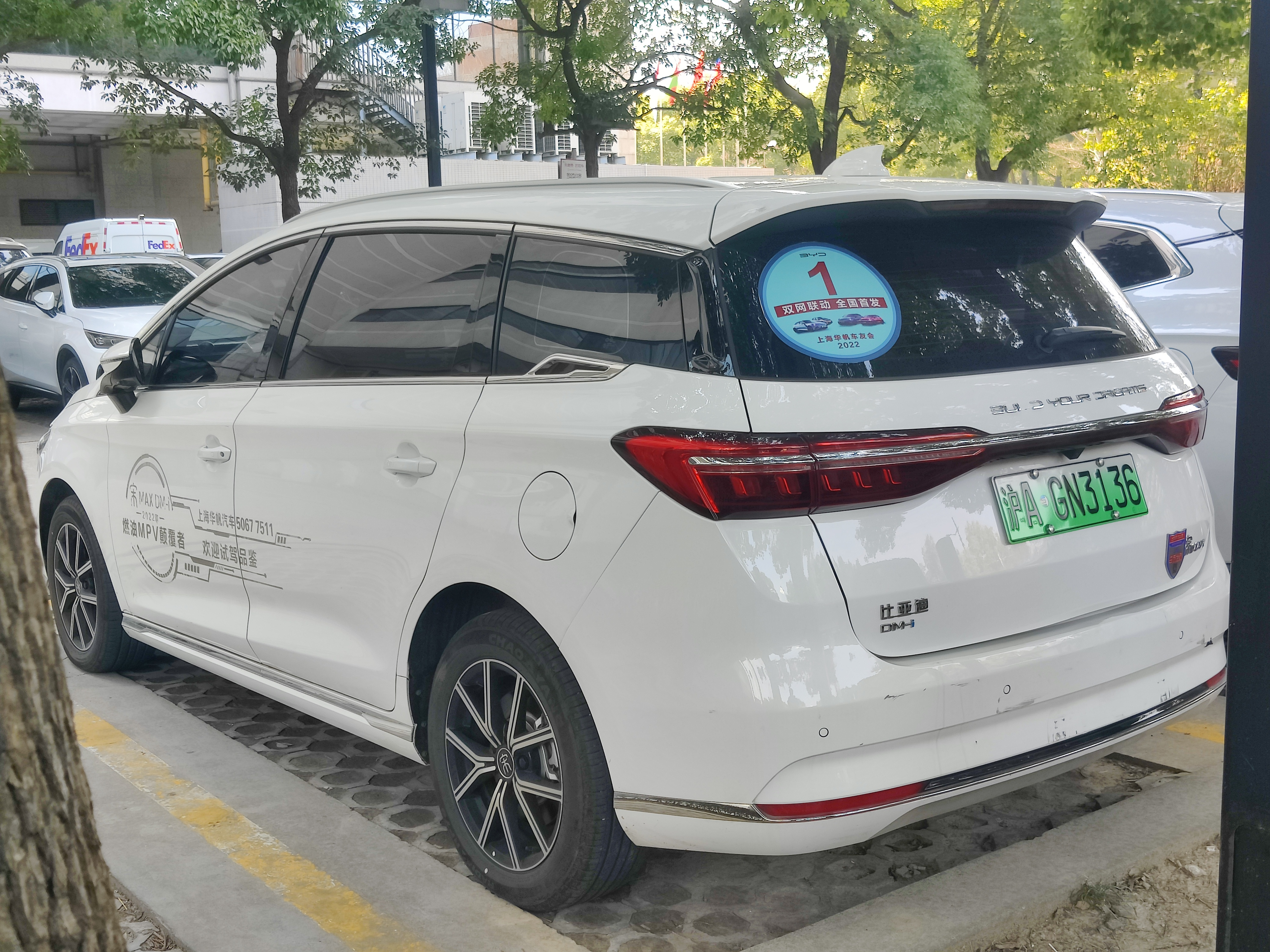
Rear

== BYD M6 / eMax 7 ==
=== EV ===
In March 2024, BYD showcased a right-hand drive Song Max EV in Thailand at the Bangkok International Motor Show, which adopts a refreshed styling. In May 2024, the vehicle was revealed with a new name, the BYD M6. The nameplate was previously used by a larger MPV in 2010. Depending on the market, the M6 is available with two battery options, both using the company's blade battery system; Standard Range with a 55.4 kWh battery pack and NEDC range of 420 kilometres (260 mi), and Extended Range with a 71.8 kWh battery pack and NEDC range of 530 kilometres (330 mi). The electric motor produces a 310 N⋅m (31.6 kg⋅m; 229 lb⋅ft) of torque with differing power outputs depending on the battery option; 120 kW (161 hp; 163 PS) on the Standard Range models, and 150 kW (201 hp; 204 PS) on the Extended Range models.

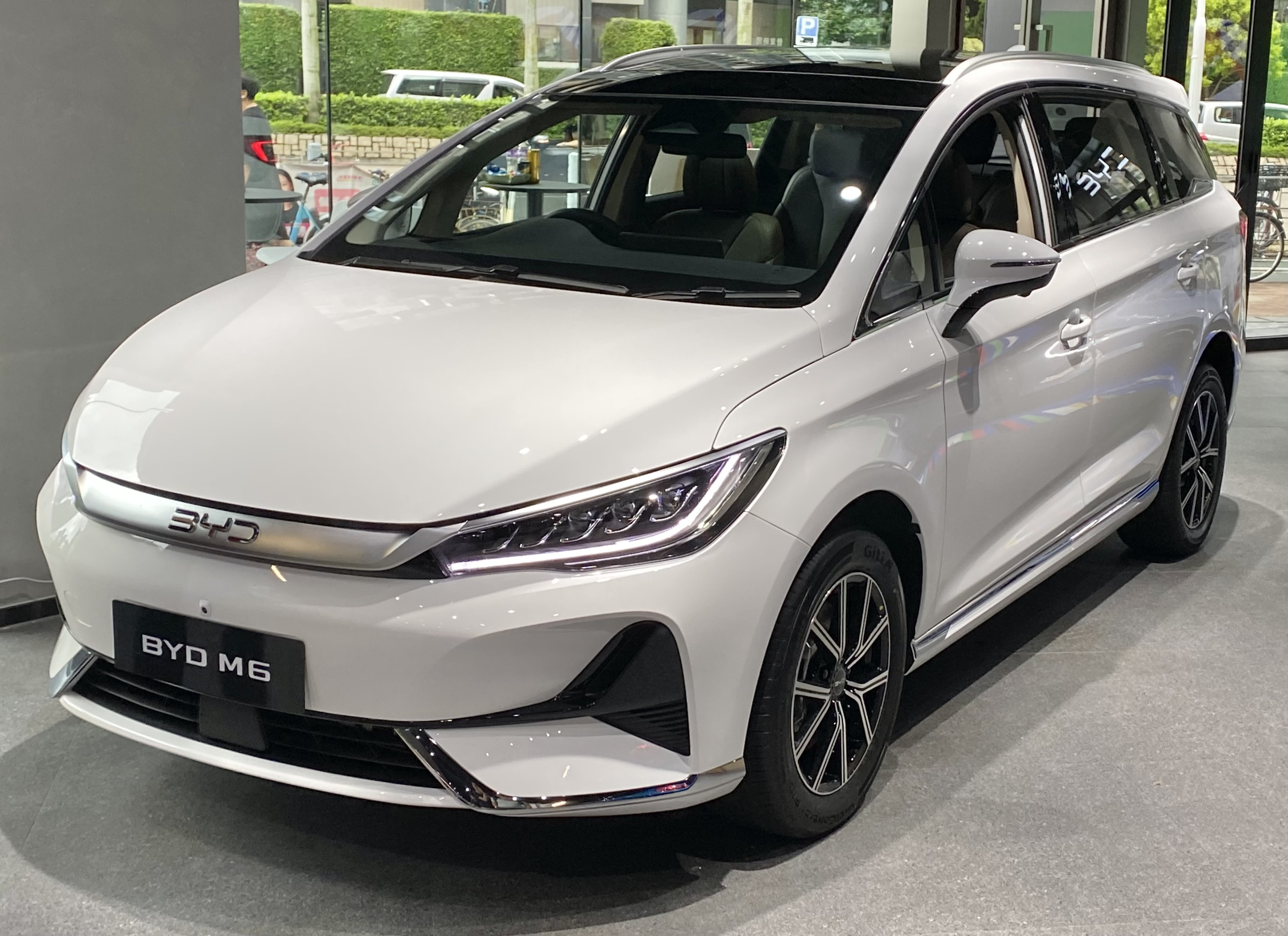
2024 BYD M6 (BEV)

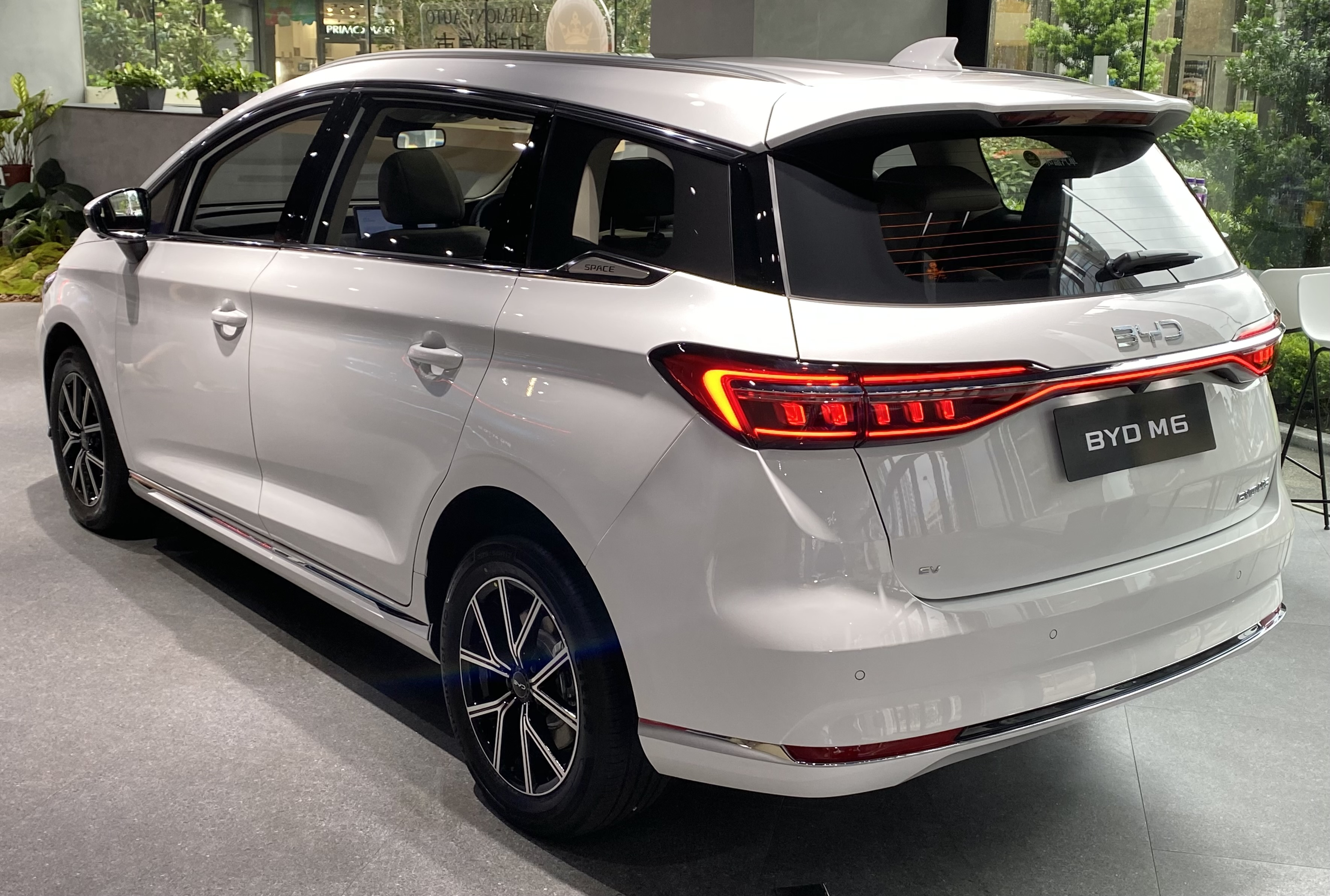
Rear view

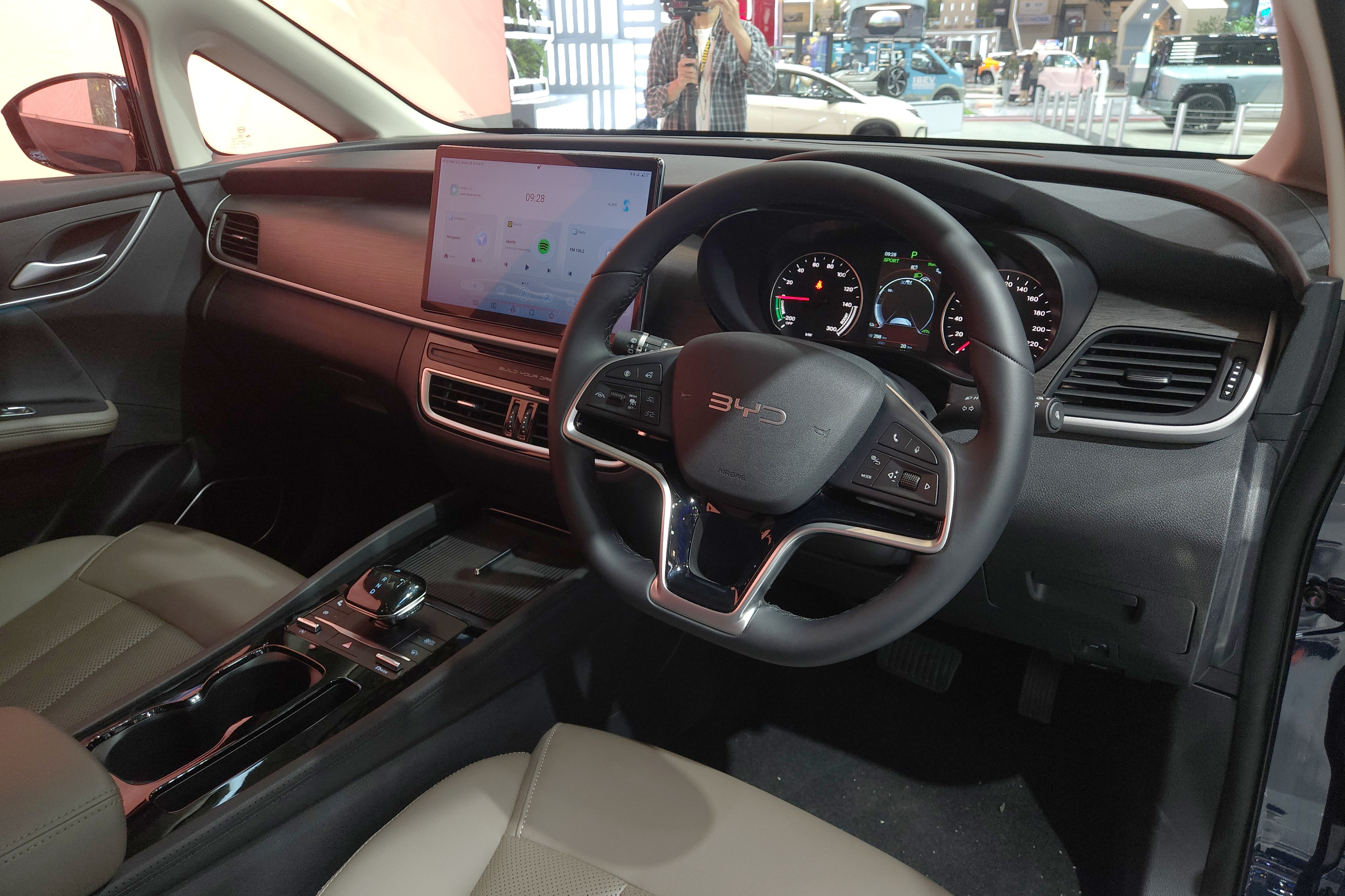
Interior

=== DM-i ===
In May 2026, BYD introduced the M6 DM in Indonesia, becoming the brand's first plug-in hybrid (PHEV) model in the country. Produced at BYD's plant in Indonesia, the vehicle is equipped with a 1.5-litre engine, paired with a 145 kW (194 hp; 197 PS) electric motor and an 18.3 kWh Blade Battery. It offers an all-electric driving range of 105 kilometres (65 mi) (NEDC), charging from 25% to 80% only 30 minutes, and a total combined cruising range of approximately 1,000 kilometres (620 mi).

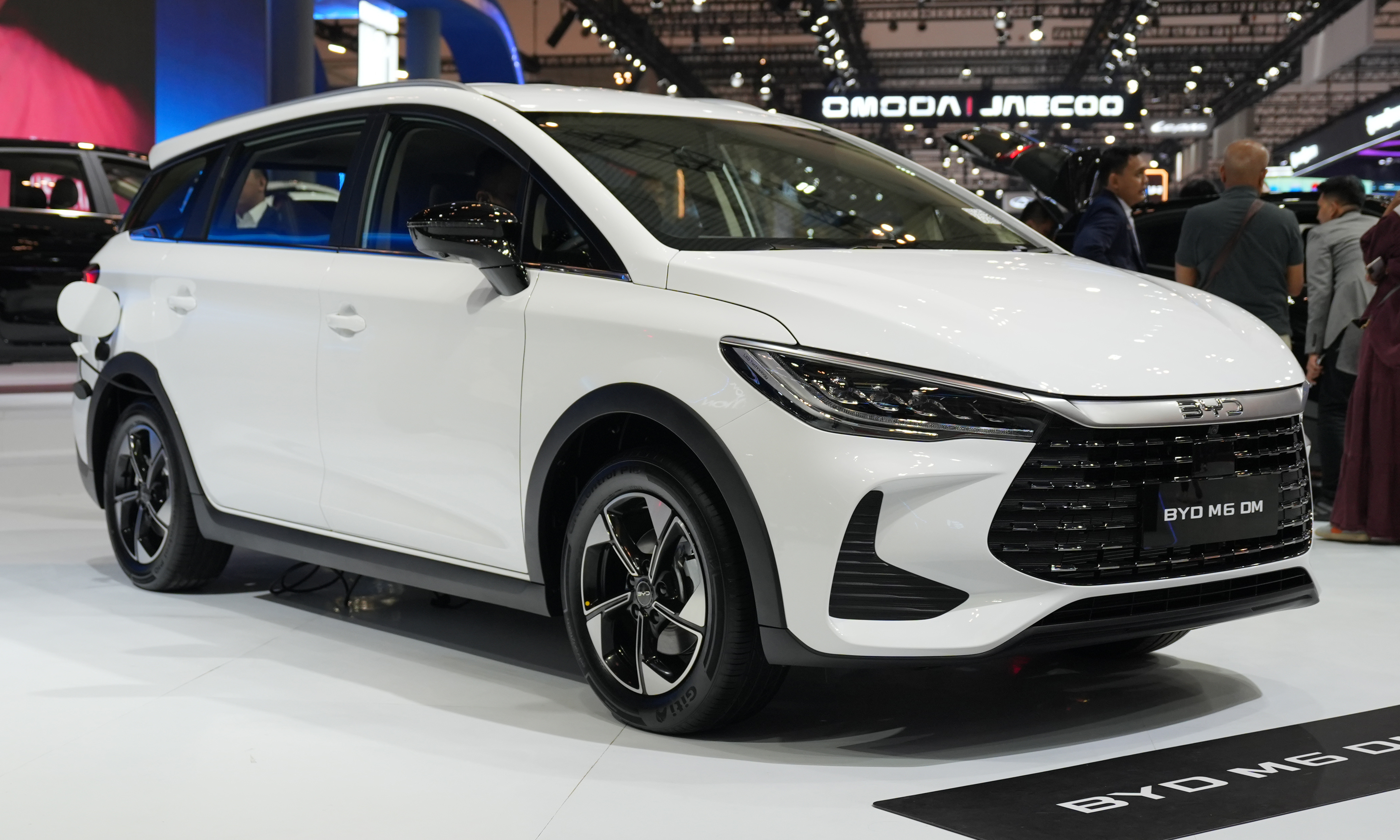
2026 BYD M6 Cross DM-i

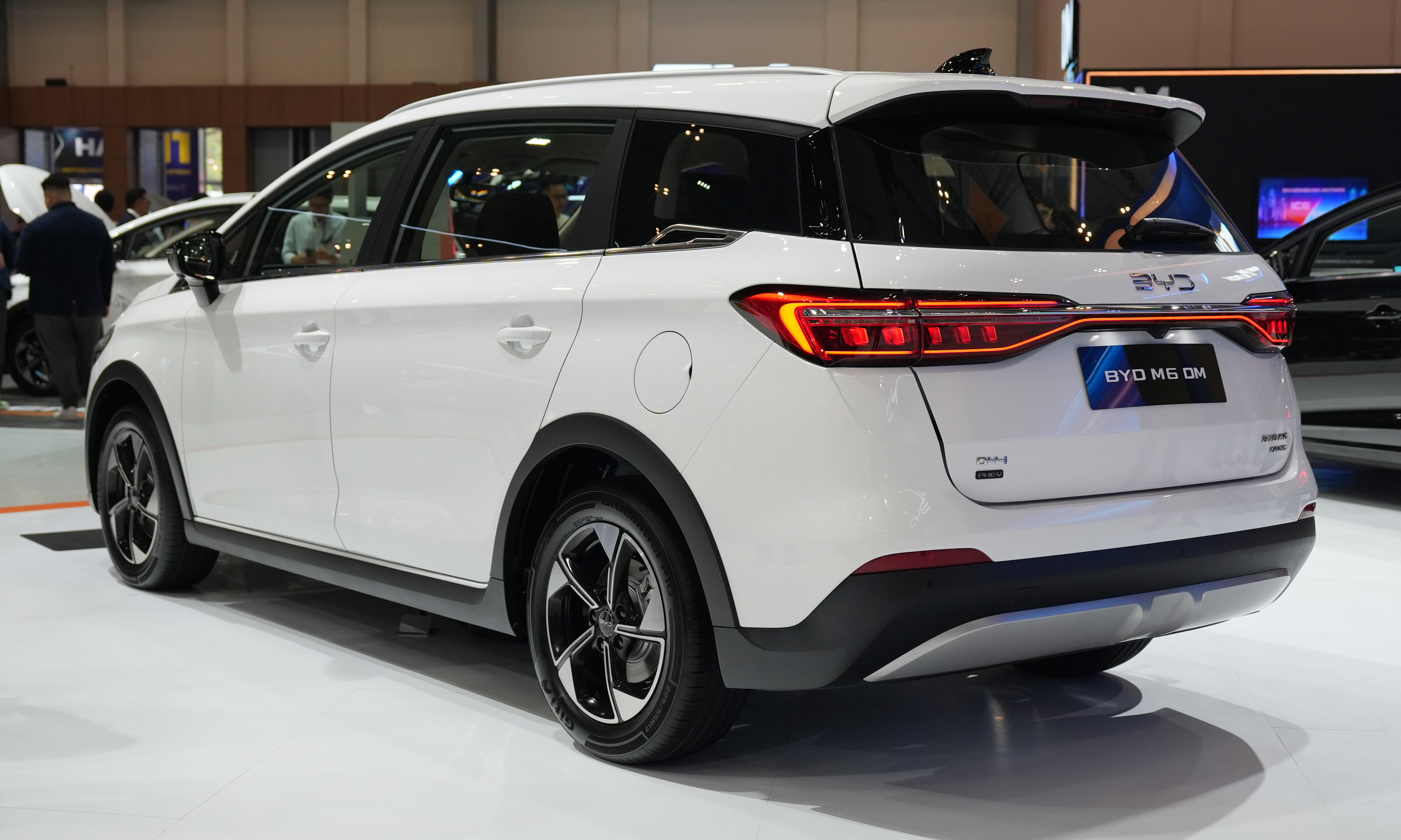
Rear view

=== Markets ===
==== Hong Kong ====
The M6 went on sale in Hong Kong in June 2024 with 6-seater and 7-seater options.

==== India ====
The M6 is marketed in India as the BYD eMax 7. It was launched on 8 October 2024 in two variants with differing battery options: Dynamic and Extended, each with a 7-seater and 6-seater configurations.

==== Indonesia ====
The M6 was unveiled for the Indonesian market in July 2024 at the 31st Gaikindo Indonesia International Auto Show. It is the first mass-produced battery electric multi-purpose vehicle (MPV) to be sold in Indonesia. Imported from China, the M6 is offered with a choice of two variants with differing battery options; Standard (55.4 kWh) and Superior (71.8 kWh). A 7-seater configuration is standard on both types, with an optional 6-seater configuration (with second-row captain seats) available on the Superior. In 2024, the M6 was the best-selling battery electric vehicle in Indonesia.

The M6 DM was introduced in Indonesia on 18 May 2026 during the brand's DM technology introduction to the country, and was launched on 12 June 2026. Locally assembled in Indonesia, the M6 DM is available with five variants: Classic Standard, Classic Dynamic, Cross Advanced, Cross Superior and Cross Superior Captain. The Classic variants use the 7.4 kWh battery pack, while the Cross variants use the 18.3 kWh battery pack. The seats configuration is the same as that of the previous EV model.

The locally assembled CKD M6 was launched in Indonesia at the 33rd Gaikindo Indonesia International Auto Show on 29 July 2026. Manufactured in BYD's Subang Plant. The CKD model received a 10.25-inch digital instrument cluster, a column-mounted gear selector, and the Standard variant received a larger 58 kWh battery, and the alloy wheels were sligthly redesigned.

==== Malaysia ====
The M6 was launched in Malaysia on 15 October 2024 with two variants available: Standard (55.4 kWh) and Extended (71.8 kWh). The M6 for the Malaysian market is only available in a 7-seater configuration.

==== Philippines ====
The M6 is marketed in the Philippines as the BYD eMax 7. It was launched on 7 April 2025, in two variants: Standard (55.4 kWh) and Superior Captain (71.8 kWh), each variant are 7-seater and 6-seater configurations, respectively.

==== Singapore ====
The M6 was launched in Singapore on 22 October 2024, in the sole Superior (71.8 kWh) variant and 7-seater configuration.

==== Thailand ====
The M6 was launched in Thailand on 9 September 2024. Imported from China, it is offered in two variant levels with differing battery options: Dynamic and Extended. The Dynamic is the Standard Range model (55.4 kWh; 420km), while the Extended is the Extended Range model (71.8 kWh; 530km). The M6 for the Thai market is only available in a 6-seater configuration.

==== Vietnam ====
The M6 was launched in Vietnam on 23 October 2024, in the sole variant using the 55.4 kWh battery pack and 7-seater configuration.

=== Trademark dispute ===
In March 2025, BMW Indonesia filed a lawsuit against BYD for unauthorized use of the "M6" trademark. BMW argued that the "M6" name, used by the BMW M6, is globally recognized for its high performance and exclusivity within its M lineup. BYD countered that the claim was "vague", stressing that the model is always marketed under the full label "BYD M6" and accompanied by the company's branding. In June 2025, the Central Jakarta Commercial Court rejected BMW's claims and dismissed the case, as the court found sufficient distinction between BMW's "M6" and BYD's "BYD M6" in both branding and vehicle type.

== Sales ==
=== Song Max ===
Year	China
2017	30,390
2018	141,068
2019	68,175
2020	25,392
2021	10,668
2022	11,050
2023	3,720
2024	291
2025	1

=== M6 / eMax 7 ===
Year	Indonesia	Thailand	Malaysia (Note: Figures based on registration (Malaysia))
2024	6,124	506	566
2025	10,682	2,296	1,683

== See also ==
- List of BYD Auto vehicles
