= BYD e6 =

Battery electric compact MPV

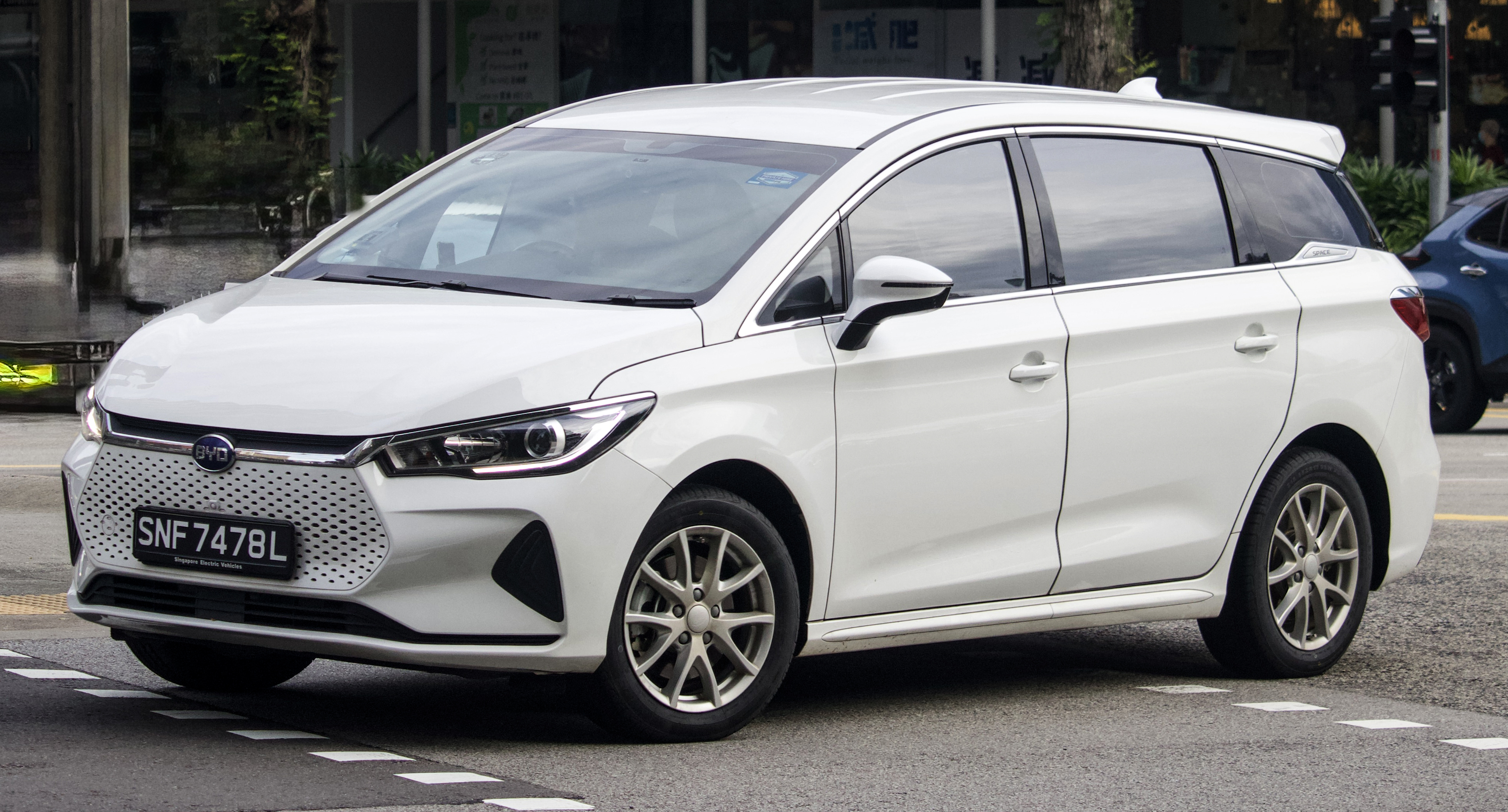

Overview
- Manufacturer: BYD Auto
- Production: 2009–present

Body and chassis
- Class: Compact MPV
- Body style: 5-door MPV

The BYD e6 is a battery electric vehicle manufactured by BYD Auto from 2009. Field testing for the first generation model began in China in May 2010 with 40 units operating as taxis in the city of Shenzhen. Sales to the general public began in Shenzhen in October 2011, over two years behind schedule of the originally planned release date of 2009.

A number of e6 units were operating in fleet service as taxis in China, Colombia, Belgium, Singapore, the U.S. (New York and Chicago), the Netherlands, the UK, and Indonesia. Since 2010 sales in China totaled 34,862 units through December 2016. The BYD e6 ranked as the best-selling pure electric car in China in 2016 and won a golden medal for “Best Quality Product” at the Havana International Fair 2015.

== First generation (2009) ==
First generation
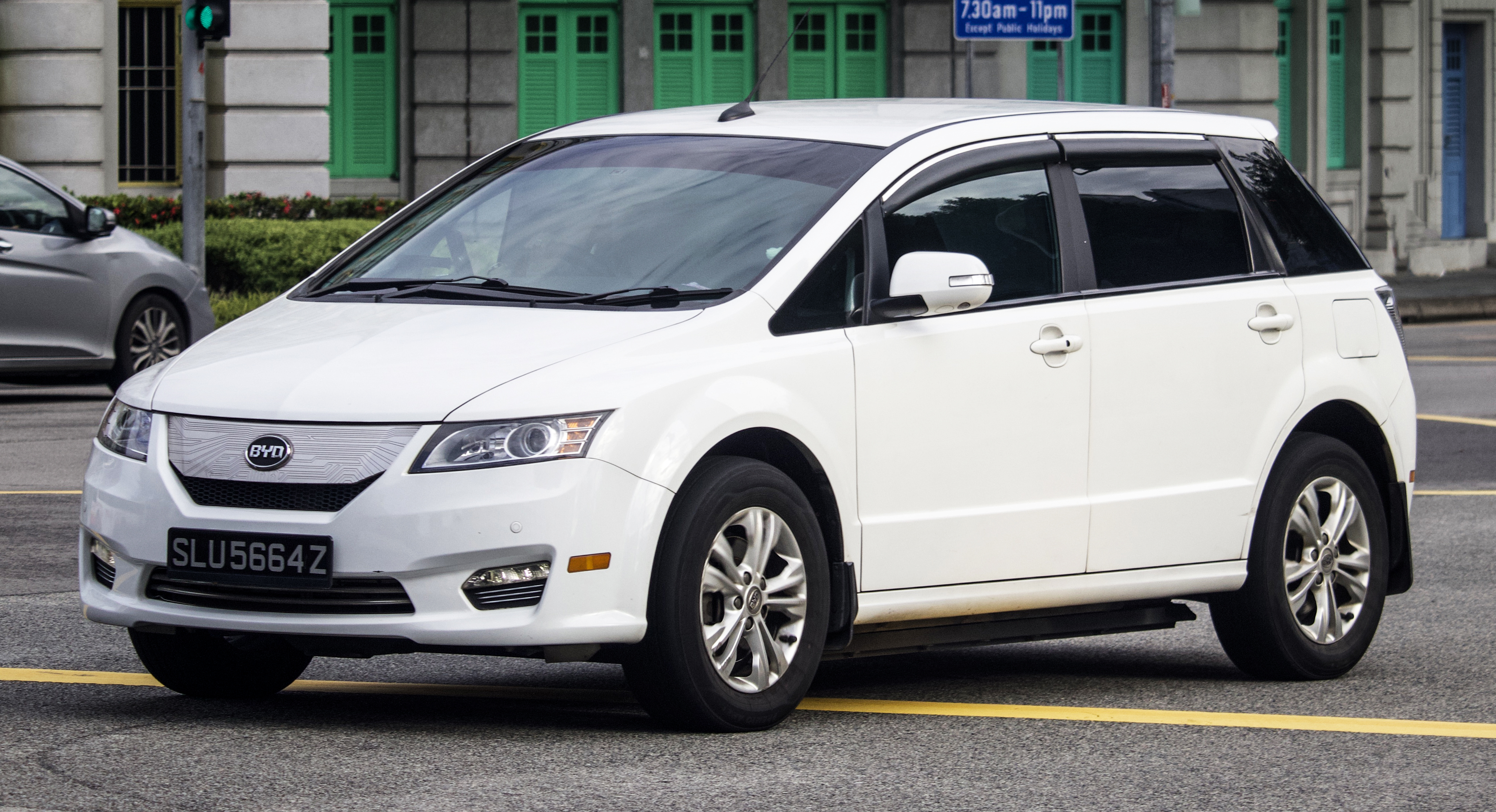

Overview
- Production: 2009–2021

Body and chassis
- Layout: Front-motor, front-wheel-drive Dual-motor, all-wheel-drive

Powertrain
- Electric motor: One or two permanent magnet synchronous motors
- Battery: 61 kWh LFP; 80 kWh LFP
- Range: 61 kWh: 300 km (186 mi); 80 kWh: 400 km (249 mi) manufacturer's claim; 370 km (230 mi) tested

Dimensions
- Wheelbase: 2,830 mm (111.4 in)
- Length: 4,560 mm (179.5 in)
- Width: 1,822 mm (71.7 in)
- Height: 1,630 mm (64.2 in)
- Curb weight: 2,020 kg (4,453 lb)

The first-generation BYD e6 was introduced in 2009. It has a range of 300 km (186 mi) according to the carmaker. Its exterior design as well as the interior design resembles the third generation Honda Odyssey (RB1/2), with a redesigned front fascia and its rear end shortened.

BYD planned to sell the e6 model in the US for US$35,000 before any government incentives. However, after rescheduling the US launch several times, in October 2011 BYD announced that sales to retail customers would be delayed at least 18 months due to the lack of charging infrastructure. In May 2013, BYD announced that the e6 would not be sold to any retail customer and would sell only to fleet customers for US$52,000, as the company planned to focus on electric bus sales in North America.

Specifications include a range of up to 400 km (with an 82-kWh battery), a guaranteed cycle life of 4000 charge cycles and fast battery charging, to 80 percent capacity, in 15 minutes. The cars are often used in vehicle fleets with large range requirements like taxis, police cars or car rentals.

=== Specifications ===
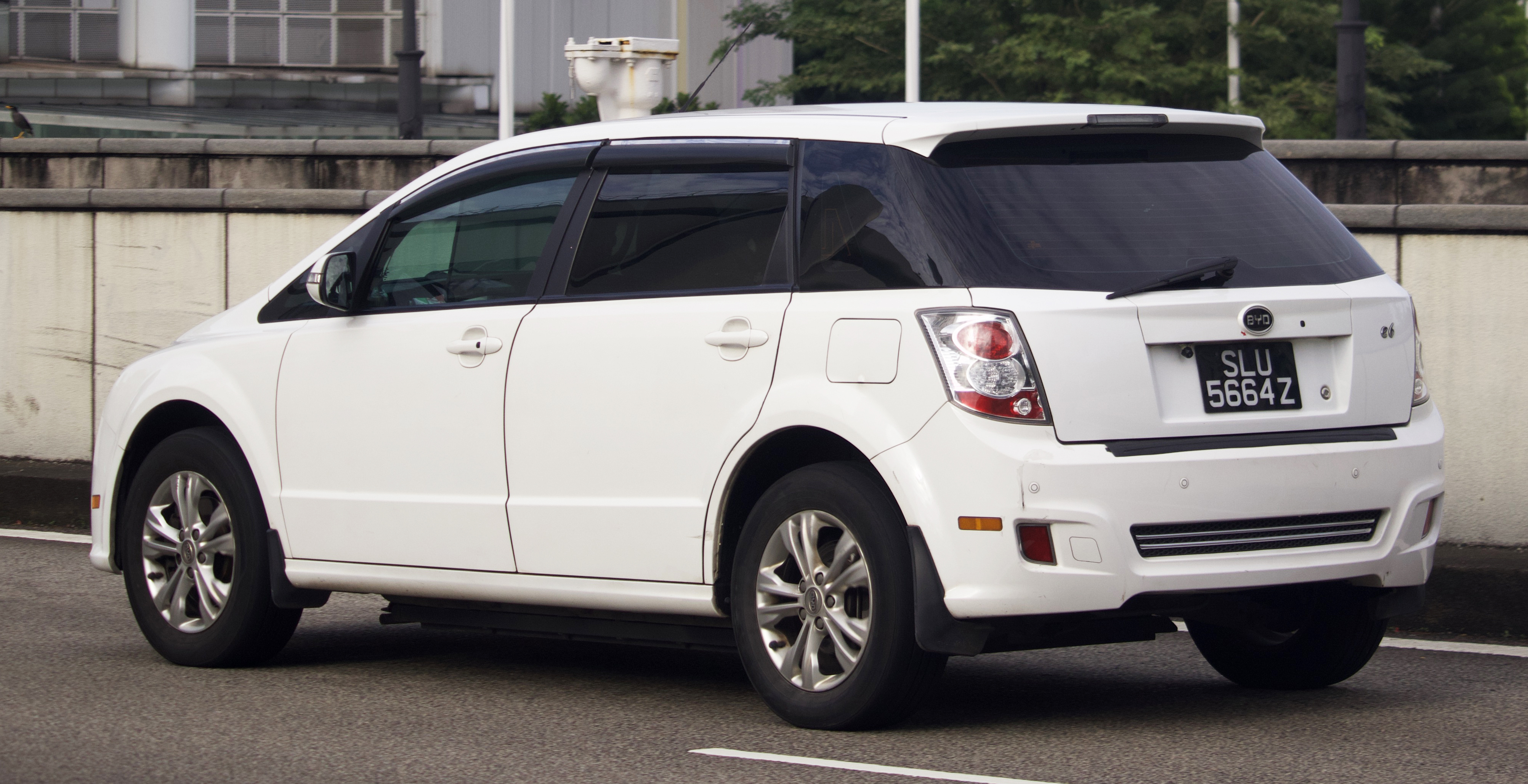
Rear view

==== Initial specs ====
BYD's initial claims for the e6 in 2009 included:

- Electric power consumption: less than 18 kWh per 100 km (62 mi)
- Acceleration: 0-60 mph (97 km/h) in < 8 seconds
- Top speed: 100 mph (160 km/h)
- Normal charge: 220V/10A household electric power socket
- Quick charge (using Three-phase AC):
- Range: 186 miles (300 km)
- BYD provides a 10-year warranty for the Fe battery

This range and consumption implies a 72-kWh battery pack, which would have been the largest in any production electric car in 2009.

==== Revised spec ====
===== Early versions (60-70 kWh) =====
BYD mentioned a smaller 48-kWh battery pack for the e6 at its debut at the 2009 North American International Auto Show (no such versions were ever sold, and the vehicles rolled out in Shenzhen, China in 2010 all used batteries with at least 60-kWh capacity). However, at the 2010 NAIAS, BYD indicated a range of 205 mi (330 km) per charge, an estimated 0-60 mph acceleration time under 14 seconds, and a top speed of 87 mph (140 km/h) for the e6.

Range has since dropped and consumption increased. According to BYD, the 40 demonstration vehicles that began operating as taxis in Shenzhen, China, have a range of 300 km (186 mi), a maximum speed of 140 km/h (87 mph), and consume 21.5 kWh per 100 km. In August 2011, BYD clarified that the e6 has a range of 230 to 240 kilometres (140 to 150 mi) under more demanding conditions, such as running the air conditioning or driving up hill. In more favorable conditions, such as city driving, with much stop and go, the range increases to 290 to 320 kilometres (180 to 200 mi). This claim, however, has not been verified by any independent third party testing.

In January 2011 BYD announced that in response to US consumers preferences, the American version will be more powerful than the Chinese version, and it will have a 60-kWh battery pack with a 160 kW electric motor, capable of reaching 0 to 60 mph in less than 8 seconds.

Plans to sell the vehicle to the general public in the US were shelved, and as of February 2016, under 100 vehicles were imported into the US to be used by fleets. China remained the main market for the car.

===== Later versions (82 kWh) =====
As of 2016, the vehicle is sold with an 82-kWh battery. This is larger than 81-kWh battery which powered the initial long-range version of the Tesla Model S. However, Tesla has made even bigger battery packs available since 2015.

The manufacturer claims the range of 400 km (249 mi). Singaporean reviewers estimated the actual range at 370 km (230 mi).

In Germany, an energy storage company named Fenecon tries to revive the interest in the car, acting as a distributor and also making the car available to European automotive journalists for testing. Nevertheless, so far Asia remains the main market for the BYD e6.

==== Batteries and powertrain ====
BYD's "Fe" lithium iron phosphate battery, which powers the e6, represents one of the company's core technologies. All chemical substances used in the battery can be recycled. There are four different power combinations for the e6: 101 hp (75 kW), 101+54 hp (75+40 kW), 215 hp (160 kW) and 215+54 hp (160+40 kW). Most of (or at least part of) the e6 battery pack is located on the belly pan of the vehicle. The two-motor options use front and rear motors, making the car all-wheel drive. According to the manufacturer the lithium iron phosphate battery of the car is charged at a fast charging station within 15 minutes to 80%, after 40 minutes at 100%.

==== Safety ====
Crash and fire

After a drunk driver crashed a high-speed Nissan GT-R into a BYD e6 taxi at 180 km/h[112 mph] in Shenzhen on May 26, 2012, the electric car caught fire after hitting a tree and all three occupants died in the accident. The Chinese investigative team concluded that the cause of the fire was "electric arcs caused by the short-circuiting of high voltage lines of the high voltage distribution box ignited combustible material in the vehicle including the interior materials and part of the power batteries." The team also found that the collisions were the cause of death of the occupants, not the fire. They also noted that the battery pack did not explode, and 75% of the single cell batteries did not catch on fire, and no flaws in the safety design of the vehicle were identified.

==== Costs ====
BYD calculates on its website that a BYD e6 (taxi) achieved with a maturity of 5 years alone in energy costs, so power consumption instead of petrol consumption, a saving of about $74,000.

=== Interior ===
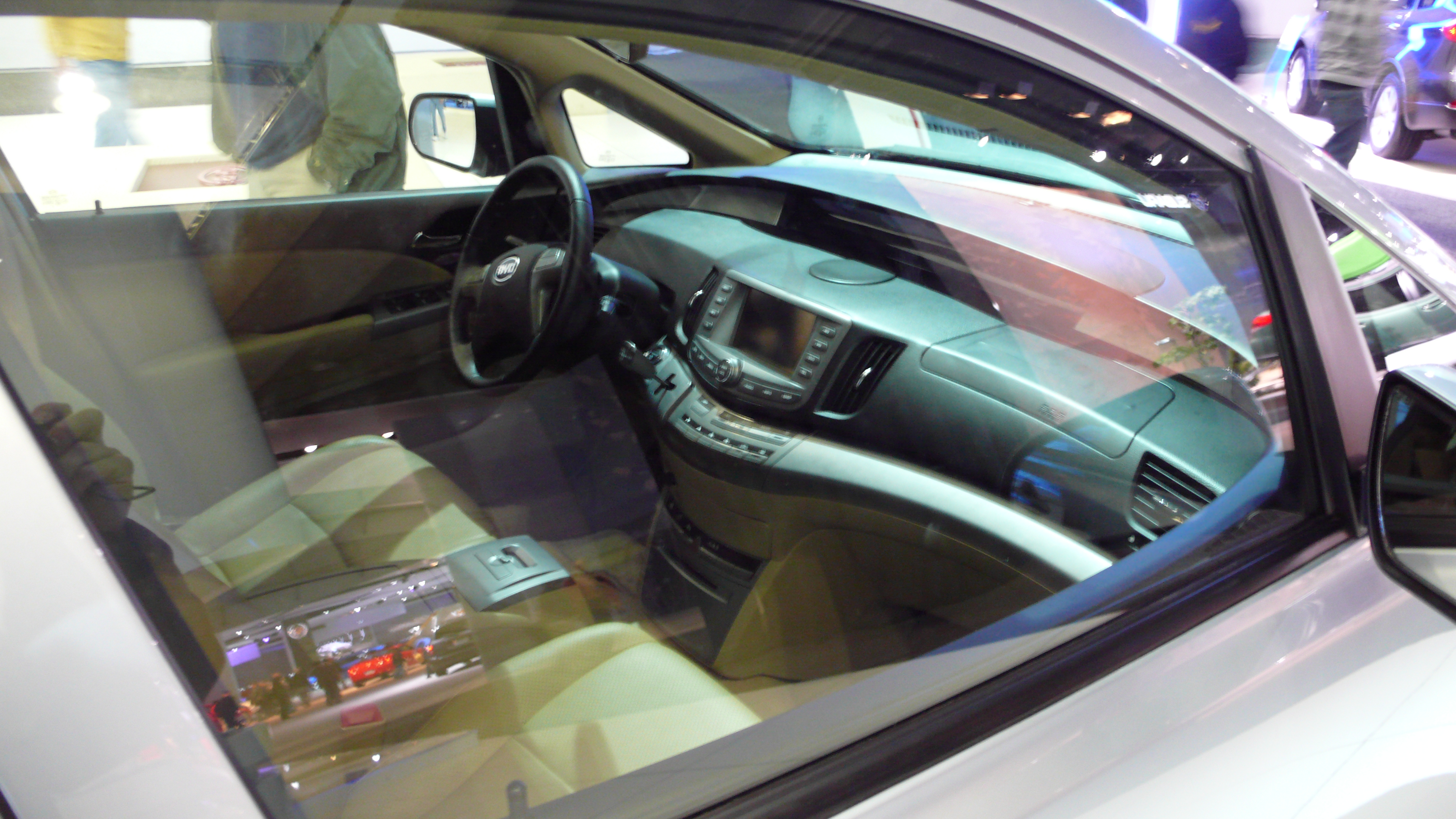
Interior.

The e6 features the latest body/frame-integral construction, with the battery pack protected in a compartment that is fully integrated into the vehicle. The battery pack's outer dimensions are: 175 cm (69 in) long, 95 cm (37 in) wide and 30 cm (12 in) in height.

The 5-passenger e6 is marketed as a family-oriented crossover vehicle.

=== Policies ===
On November 4, 2012, BYD released its new gimmick for promoting the sales of its pure-electric vehicle e6 and electric bus at a Beijing-based press conference, which is called "Zero vehicle purchase price, Zero costs, Zero emissions" and supported financially by China Development Bank, over 30 Billion RMB now being ready for this financial program. According to the scheme targeting specifically the public transit operators/companies, customers can choose one of three provided optional operating models which could be most suitable to themselves. The three operating models as the following table reads.

Model	Financing Body	Lease Period	Ownership
Financial Lease	Finance Company	A complete electric vehicle operational life cycle (e.g. 5 years)	During the lease period, the financial organization owns the electric vehicle. The taxi company pays the lease in installments. After the lease period ends, the taxi company owns the vehicle.
Operational Lease	Third party vehicle lease company	A complete electric vehicle operational life cycle (e.g. 5 years) or a shorter period (e.g. 1 year)	During this lease period and after it ends, the vehicle lease company owns the vehicle. The taxi company and the vehicle lease company sign an operational lease contract for the lease.
Buyer's Credit	The Taxi Company		The taxi company has ownership of the vehicle. The taxi company pays monthly installments to the financial institution.

The policy initiate explained the concept of "ZERO COST" by comparing the five-year fees between a fuel taxi and its all-electric cab in Shenzhen city and after a sequence of calculations, it came to the conclusion that "if the hire car runs for 5 years, and the total saving over 5 years is deducted from the higher cost of the vehicle and the interest on multiple payments, it can save 326,400 RMB. Besides, the company said if enough mileages are done, "the vehicle payment will be entirely offset". BYD also emphasized the "ZERO EMISSION" feature of its renewable-energy vehicles by stating that "an e6 electric taxi saves 14,120 litres of fuel per year, with 32 tonnes fewer CO2 emissions", and "169 million litres of fuel could be saved with CO2 emissions reduced by 38.62 million tonnes per year" if all Chinese taxis would be replaced with its EVs.

Currently, this policy is only eligible for Chinese market.

=== Markets ===
==== Belgium ====
The Brussels local government selected BYD to provide electric taxis. In 2014, 35 BYD e6 taxis started their service in Brussels.

==== Canada ====
In Quebec, 80-kWh BYDs are used as taxis. An electric taxi importer company started rolling out these vehicles in 2019, when the first 25 vehicles arrived; the vehicles are offered to taxi drivers on a lease-purchase basis. The company stated they hope to put as many as 2,000 of them on the road within two years.

==== China ====
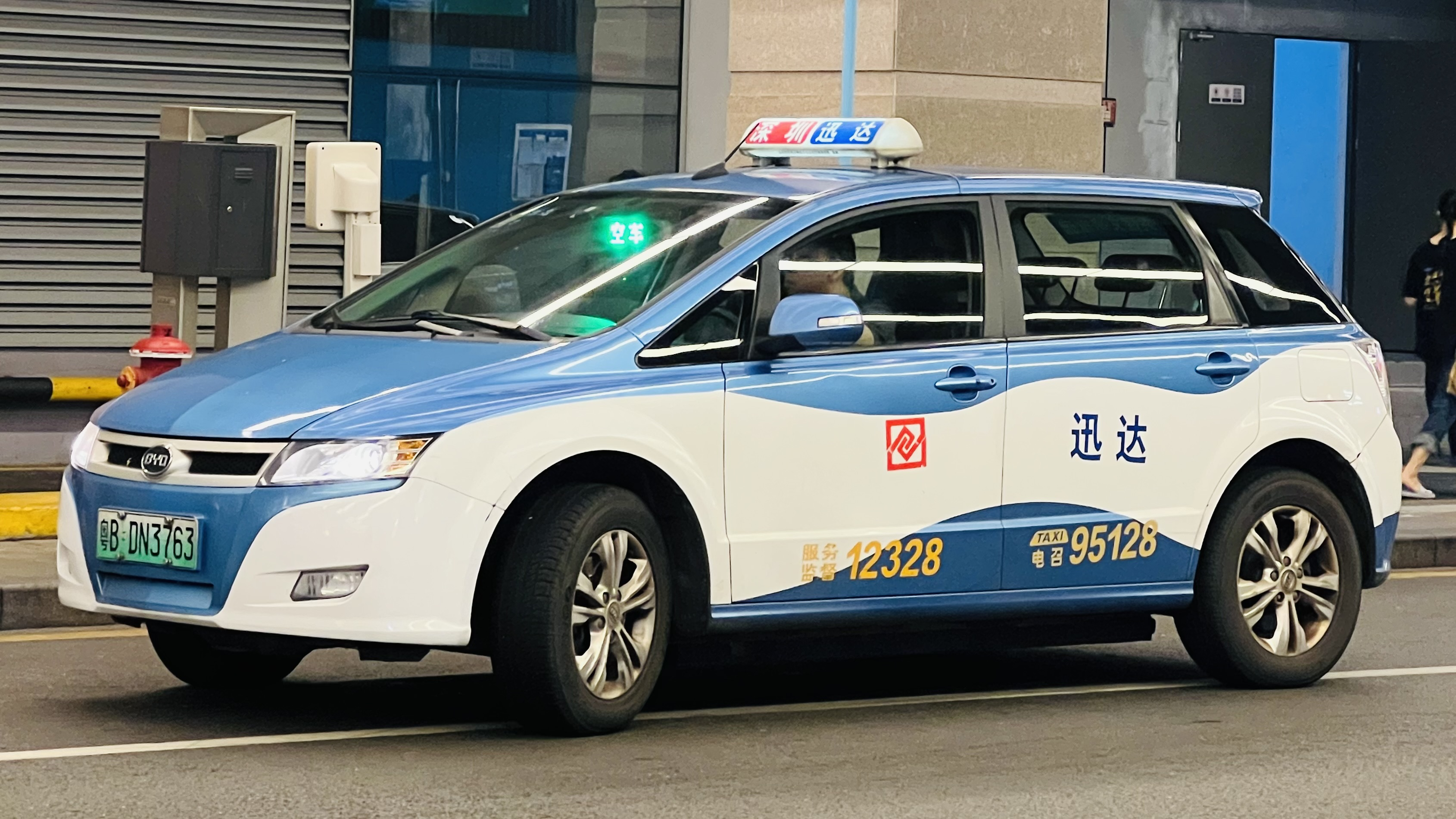
BYD e6 taxi in Guangdong, China.

In March 2010, the South China Morning Post reported that BYD had postponed plans to mass-produce purely electric cars in China in 2010, to instead only produce 100 e6 cars for use as taxis in Shenzhen for field testing in 2010 in favor of marketing the less-expensive F3DM plug-in hybrid for the Chinese market.

The field testing program in Shenzhen began in May 2010 with 40 e6 electric cars running as taxis operated by BYD's subsidiary Pengcheng Electric Taxi Co., out of a fleet of 100 planned to be deployed later in 2010. This expansion did not take place, as 50 cars ended up being used. BYD released an upbeat announcement about the success of the testing program in conjunction with investor Warren Buffett's September visit, but did not release any information about range, acceleration or speed achieved by the test cars.

In April 2011, one year after the taxi trial began, BYD reported that its e6 taxi fleet in Shenzhen had accumulated a total of around 1,730,000 miles (2,780,000 km). The electric taxis are continuously quick charged in 20 to 30 minutes without showing any diminished range or drop in battery performance due to rapid-charging conditions, which according to BYD, "provides a proven track record for its Iron-Phosphate battery technology." BYD also announced that 250 e6s are being delivered to the International University in Shenzhen before August 2011. In June 2011 BYD announced that the fleet of e6 taxicabs had surpassed 1,864,114 miles (3,000,001 km)

In October 2011, BYD commenced sales of the e6 to the general public of Shenzhen at a price of 369,800 RMB before government subsidies, or 249,800 RMB after subsidies. Production e6s are equipped with BYD's i system, which enables owners to control parts of the car (e.g. the air conditioning and door locks) remotely from a smartphone. At the beginning of 2013, BYD won a big order for providing 500 battery-electric, e6 police vehicles to the Shenzhen Municipal Public Security Bureau, adding to the existing 300 BYD e6 Taxis with 18.6 million total miles in this city.

Only 33 units were sold in 2010, 401 during 2011, 1,690 in 2012, and 1,544 during 2013. Sales increased significantly in 2014 to 3,560 units, 7,029 in 2015, and climbed to 20,605 units were delivered in 2016, making the e6 the top selling all-electric plug-in passenger car in China in 2016. Cumulative sales in China totaled 34,862 units through December 2016.

==== Hong Kong ====
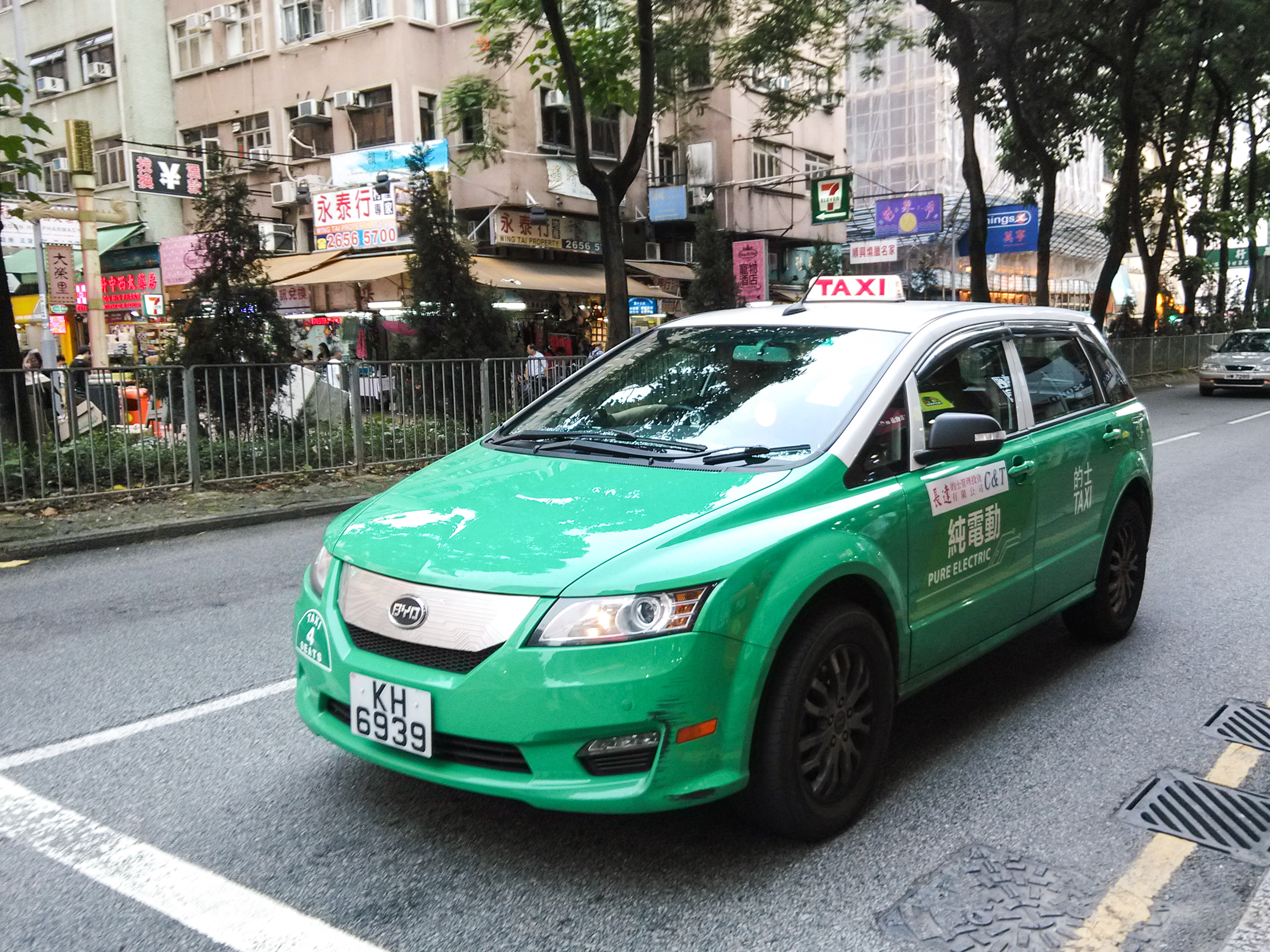
BYD e6 taxi in Hong Kong.

45 units of BYD e6 are scheduled for Hong Kong as e-taxis in May 2012 according to Mr. Wang Chuanfu, Chairman and President of BYD Co. Ltd. when he addressed at a press conference for BYD's "Electrified Transportation Solution" aiming at a dramatical automobile emission-reduction of 56% for this city. The amount of BYD e6 taxis in Hong Kong may hit up to 1,000 next year and then enormously increase to 3,000 units by 2015. The first batch of charging poles for these 45 BYD e-cabs are under construction at present and the second batch of charging stations is expected to be in place before this May, ensuring that each e-taxi will get access to one charging appliance.

The two-year trial run of the e-taxis project was halted by the Hong Kong Government, as the three trial operators have switched to register the vehicles as private cars due to poor performance. The project was branded as a failure by BYD.

BYD partnered with Carshare.hk and other car rental stores to offer rental of refurbished e6. With carshare.hk e6 adapt a rent-to-own model where for around 4500 HKD / months for 3 years, renter will have complete ownership of the vehicle.

In 2018, BYD started to scale back and eventually stopped their free charging services. Chargers at various carparks are still installed, but no longer function.

==== Colombia ====
The first South American all-electric taxi fleet made up of BYD e6 was launched at the beginning of 2013 in Bogotá, the capital city of Colombia after receiving operation approval by the Colombia Ministry of Transportation without any bothering license plate restrictions, in an effort to improve the local air quality and set an example to other cities in this green-energy chasing country. In September 2013 a total of 45 e6 taxis of this pilot program were delivered. The e6 fleet are part of Colombia's "BIOTAXIS Project." This e-taxi fleet has also operated in the charge of Praco Didacol, the distributor of BYD Auto in Colombia. Another three BYD e6s were sent to Colciencias, Bogota's Tech, Science and Innovation Administration.

==== Costa Rica ====
In January 2013 the local representative of BYD Auto signed an agreement with the Costa Rican Ministry of Environment and Energy to deploy 200 BYD e6 electric cars for use as "green taxis." The electric cars will be exempt from import duties and the government has agreed to deploy charging stations in strategic locations in San José, Costa Rica. Since May 2013 the e6 is available for sale for taxi use only.

==== Indonesia ====
25 units of the first-generation e6 were imported and operated by the transportation company Bluebird Group in the country under the e-Bluebird (formerly Bluebird e-Taxi when first launched) regular taxi service between 2019 and 2024. The taxis were first revealed on 22 April 2019, alongside 5 Tesla Model X 75Ds that were operated under the Silverbird e-Taxi (later e-Silverbird) executive taxis. Both e6 and Model X taxis went on service on 1 May 2019, coinciding with Bluebird Group's 47th anniversary. The first-generation e6 fleet were phased out after five-years in service on the third quarter of 2024. They were replaced by the second-generation e6.

==== Netherlands ====
In June 2011 BYD and the city of Rotterdam entered a binding agreement for an undisclosed number of e6s to be delivered for use as taxicabs. The deal is part of a larger scheme named 75-EV-RO, where the city has pledged to purchase 75 alternative energy vehicles. In December 2013 the Rotterdam Taxi Centre, one of the biggest taxi operators in the Netherlands, put two e6 taxis into service a successful trial period. The company plans to expand its e6 fleet to 25 within the next 19 months.

==== New Zealand ====
No fleet import of the E6 have occurred, these vehicles were imported privately and sold via a local auction house from Singapore once the taxi cab fleet there was wound down. Many vehicles have been resprayed and serviced before leaving Singapore. Each vehicle is road tested locally and battery ranges and conditions are noted.

==== Singapore ====
In 2022, ComfortDelGro Taxi added 100 BYD e6 to its fleet of taxi.

==== Taiwan ====
BYD Taiwan, a joint venture of BYD Hong Kong and Taiwan Solar Energy Co., said it has received orders from a local taxi association for more than 1,500 e6 cars, with delivery scheduled to begin in the first quarter of 2014. The company said it has commissioned a local automaker to assemble the first BYD e6 vehicles to be sold in Taiwan to speed up regulatory inspections and approvals.

==== United Kingdom ====
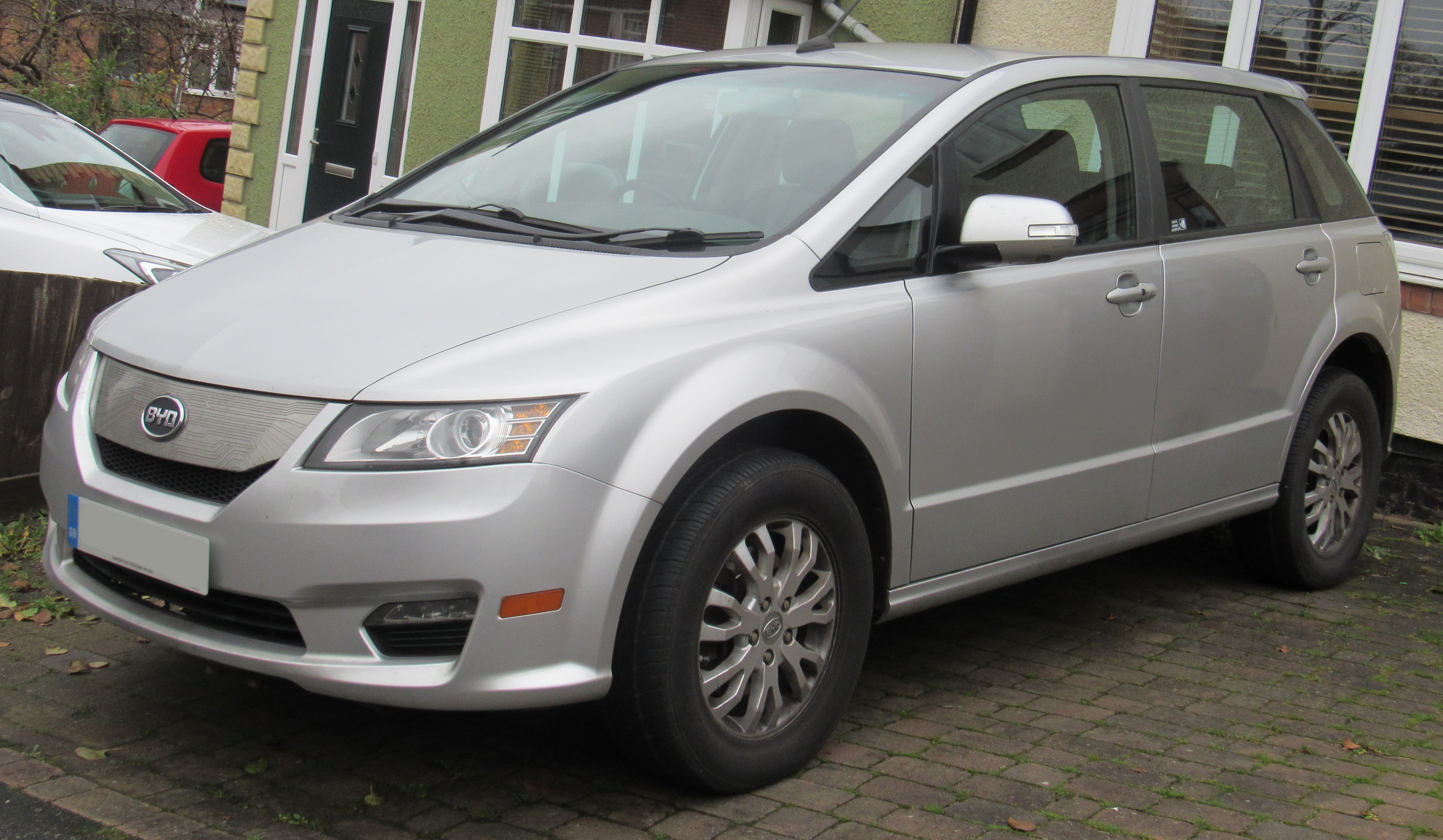
BYD e6 Warwickshire.

BYD signed an agreement with Green Tomato Cars, the second largest quality minicab service in London, to deliver a 50-unit fleet of BYD e6 to the city. The delivery was scheduled to take place in the second quarter of 2013. In February 2014 Green Tomato Cars announced that the deal with BYD was canceled. However, 20 units were delivered in February 2014 to run as minicabs in London by a new firm called Thriev.

==== United States ====
In 2009 BYD indicated the e6 would be available in the United States in 2010 at a price just over US$40,000, and planned a rollout beginning in Southern California followed by several American cities. In October 2010 BYD announced that it was delaying its plans and US sales were rescheduled to 2011. In December 2010 the carmaker announced plans to ship as many as 50 BYD e6 electric cars by the end of 2011 to fleet customers in Southern California, including the municipal government of Los Angeles. BYD plans to sell the e6 model in the US for US$35,000 before any government incentives. One of the biggest obstacles will be passing US crash testing, something which BYD plans to complete in 2011. As of August 2011, sales were scheduled to begin in the second quarter of 2012. However, in October 2011 BYD opened its headquarters in Los Angeles, a year behind schedule, and announced that retail sales will be delayed at least for 18 months due to the lack of charging infrastructure.

Some commentators have noted that BYD has yet to bring a single all-electric car to the American consumer market and has repeatedly missed launch deadlines, giving rise to speculation about BYD's labor-intensive process of cell production's capability of achieving the uniformity of quality required for electric car batteries.

In 2010 the City of Los Angeles agreed to purchase 10 e6 electric cars and lease a further 20. City officials also intend to start a pilot program running five of BYD's K9 electric buses.

As of 19 February 2013, there were 11 units of BYD e6 reaching US from China and then heading to BYD North America headquarters located in Los Angeles. However, the purpose of this fleet has not been officially proclaimed. In May 2013, BYD announced that the e6 will be sold in the US only to fleet consumers, and instead of making the car available to the general public, the company will focus on electric bus sales in North America.

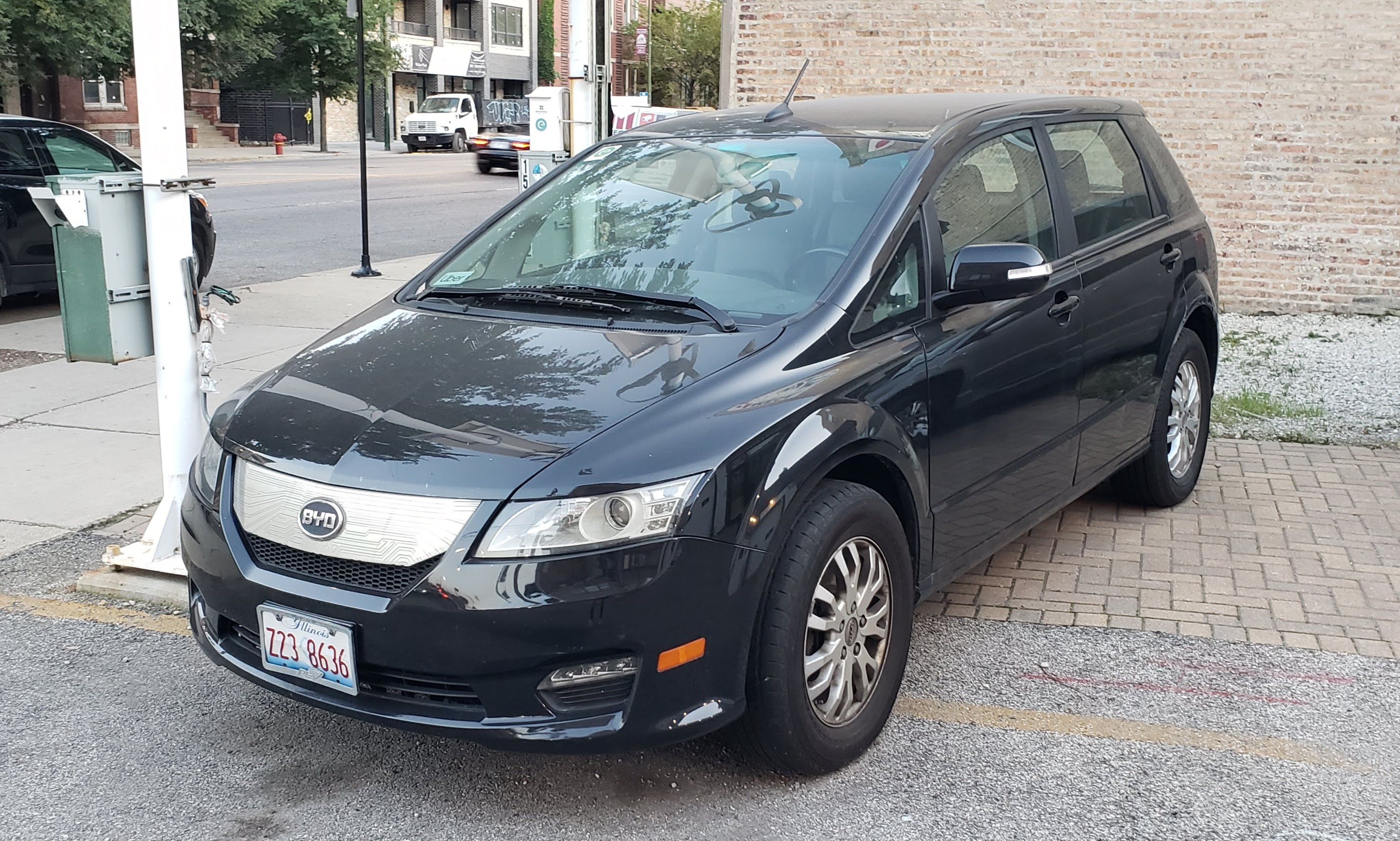
BYD e6 in Chicago, Illinois

By March 2015 there were about 25 BYD e6s being used by Uber drivers in Chicago as part of a test program. BYD's dealer in the city offered several options to drivers interested in the e6, including a traditional lease or a lease-to-own program. The most popular program allows an Uber driver to lease an e6 for US$200 a week and use it for a driving shift, and thereafter the car is returned to a dealer lot, where it is charged until it is used again. According to BYD America Vice President, as of February 2016, about 80 units have been imported to the U.S., with about 50 of those brought to New York for vehicle for hire companies.

==== Uruguay ====
As of January 2018 there was at least 25 BYD e6 taxi in operation in Montevideo, Uruguay. UTE has installed 11 charging stations in Montevideo and announced plans to install 4 more in 2019.

==== Thailand ====
The BYD e6 was launched in the Thai market in September 2018 (along with the K9 electric bus).

50 units were delivered in 2018 to EV Society Co, operating a taxi fleet at Bangkok-Suvarnabhumi Airport. In early 2019, 50 more bookings were received from the same company for their operations at Bangkok-Don Mueang Airport.

== Second generation (2021) ==
Second generation
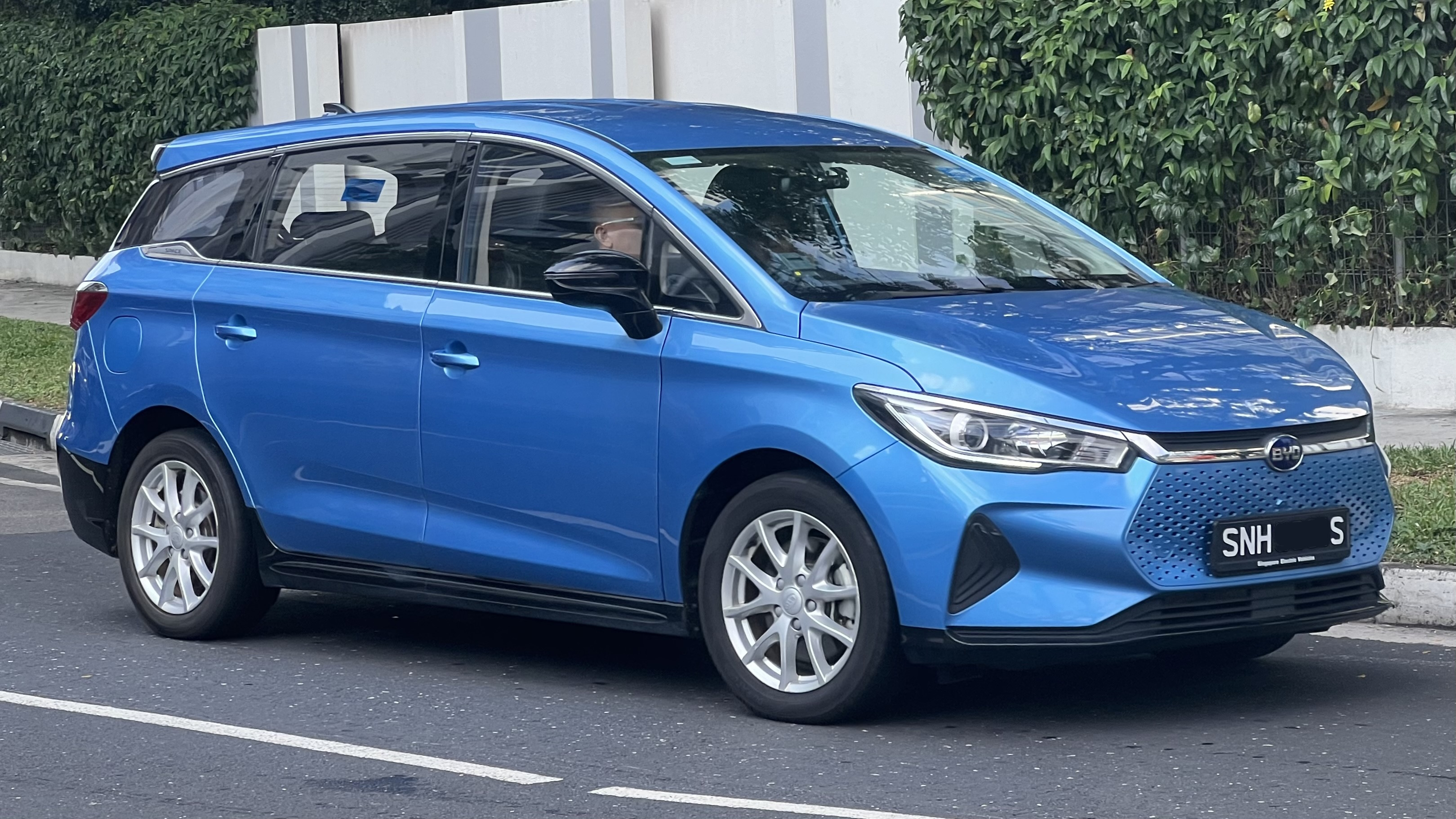

Overview
- Production: 2021–present
- Assembly: China: Shenzhen, Guangdong

Body and chassis
- Related: BYD Song Max / M6 / eMax 7

Powertrain
- Electric motor: AC permanent magnet synchronous
- Power output: 70 kW (95 PS; 94 hp)
- Transmission: Fixed-ratio
- Battery: 71.7 kWh LiFePO_{4} battery pack
- Range: 415 km (258 mi) (WLTP combined), 520 km (323 mi) (WLTP City)

Dimensions
- Wheelbase: 2,800 mm (110.2 in)
- Length: 4,695 mm (184.8 in)
- Width: 1,810 mm (71.3 in)
- Height: 1,670 mm (65.7 in)
- Curb weight: 1,930 kg (4,255 lb)

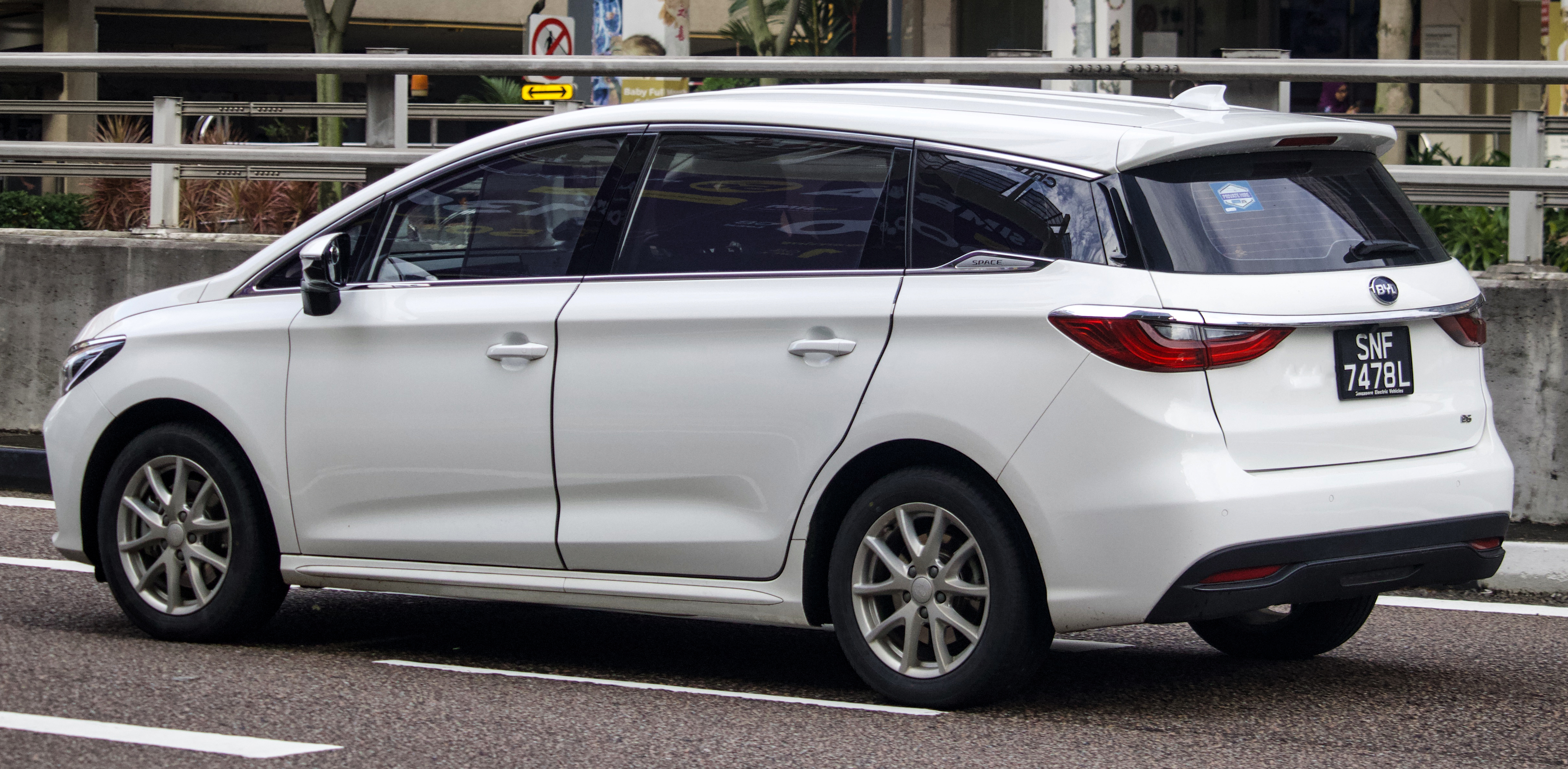
Rear view

The second generation BYD e6 is heavily based on the BYD Song Max, while featuring a redesigned front fascia with the Dragon Face design language resulting in an increased length and height compared to the Song Max. Performance wise, the second generation e6 uses BYD's Blade Batteries and is powered by a 70 kW (95 PS; 94 hp) electric motor. It is a 5-seater model with generous boot space for luggage.

This model is available in two trims: the GL trim only supports DC charging via CCS2 and no AC charging, the GLX trim supports the same DC charging and also 1-phase charging (6.6 kW). 3-phase AC fast charging at up to 40 kW is unique amongst new EVs. It was taken over from the first generation e6 and is an important feature for those taxi services that had invested in 3-phase AC fast charging (40 kW, 60A) infrastructure before.

BYD e6 was made available in right-hand drive markets Singapore, Australia (though only 15 vehicles in Australia), Hong Kong, Thailand, Nepal and India.

== See also ==
- List of BYD Auto vehicles
