= List of superzoom lenses =

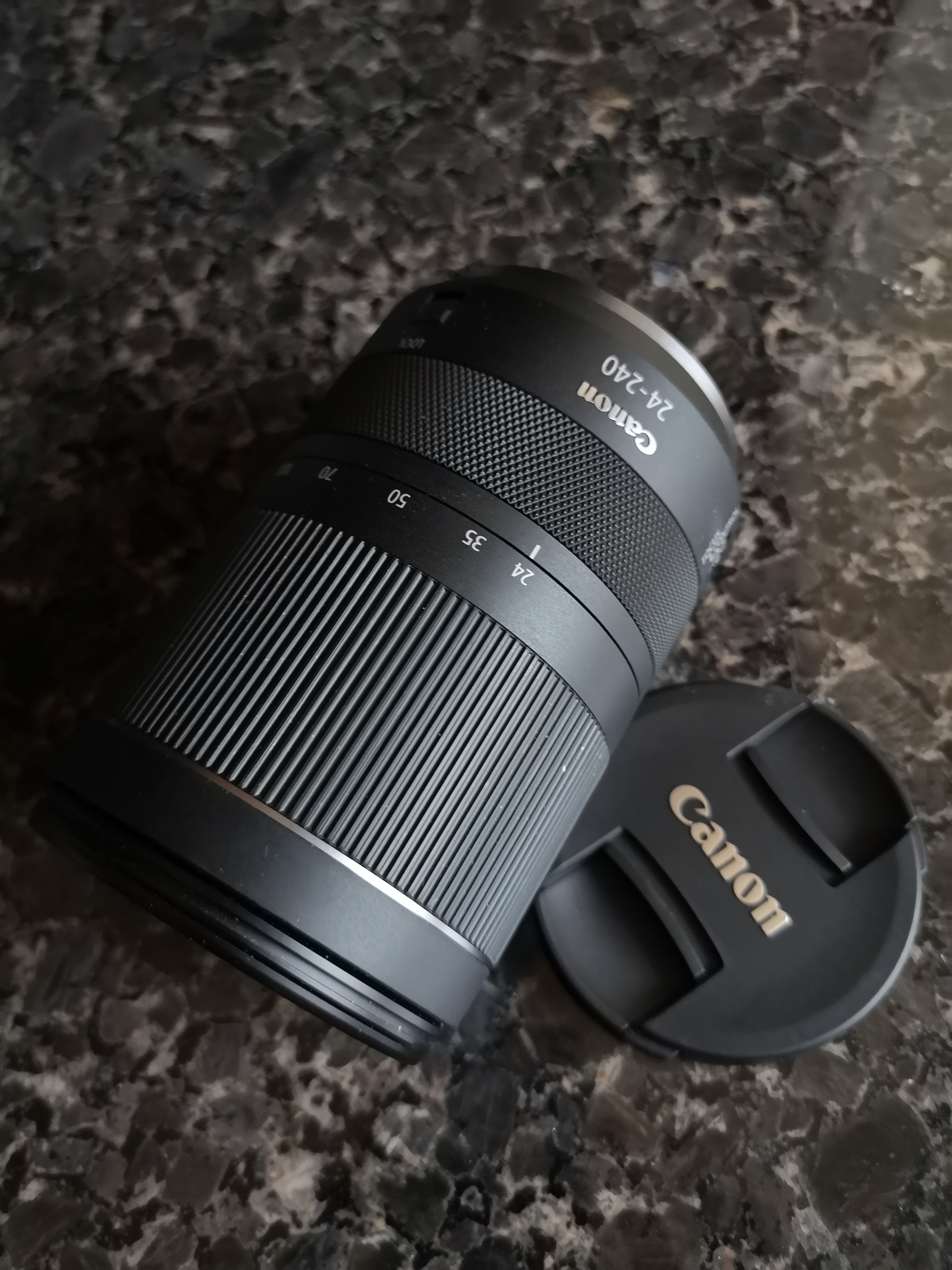
Canon 24-240mm F4-6.3, a superzoom lens

This is a list of superzoom lenses, sometimes referred to as all-in-one lenses, that are designed for mirrorless cameras.

There is no precise definition of superzoom, but lenses marketed as such usually have an optical zoom ratio greater than 7×. Lenses marketed as all-in-one usually cover a wide-angle to telephoto range beyond that of standard zoom lenses. There is significant overlap between the two categories with a few exceptions. For example, the Sigma 60-600mm F4.5-6.3 is considered a superzoom lens but not an all-in-one lens. Conversely, the Tamron 35-150mm F2-2.8 is considered an all-in-one lens but not a superzoom lens.

== Full-frame superzoom lenses ==
This is a list of lenses designed for full-frame mirrorless cameras that have an optical zoom ratio greater than 7×.

| Model | Lens mounts | Optical zoom | Focal length (Note: 35mm equivalent.) | | Aperture | | OIS | Weight | Length | Release year | Availability |
| Model | Lens mounts | Optical zoom | Wide | Tele | Wide | Tele | OIS | Weight | Length | Release year | Availability |
|---|---|---|---|---|---|---|---|---|---|---|---|
| Nikon 28-400mm F4-8 | Z | 14.3× | 28mm | 400mm | f/4.0 | f/8.0 | Yes | 725g | 142mm | 2024 | Current |
| Tamron 28-300mm F4-7.1 | E | 10.7× | 28mm | 300mm | f/4.0 | f/7.1 | Yes | 610g | 126mm | 2024 | Current |
| Sigma 60-600mm F4.5-6.3 | E, L | 10.0× | 60mm | 600mm | f/4.5 | f/6.3 | Yes | 2485g | 281mm | 2023 | Current |
| Sony 24-240mm F3.5-6.3 | E | 10.0× | 24mm | 240mm | f/3.5 | f/6.3 | Yes | 780g | 119mm | 2015 | Current |
| Canon 24-240mm F4-6.3 | RF | 10.0× | 24mm | 240mm | f/4.0 | f/6.3 | Yes | 750g | 123mm | 2019 | Current |
| Sigma 20-200mm F3.5-6.3 | E, L | 10.0× | 20mm | 200mm | f/3.5 | f/6.3 | No | 540g | 118mm | 2025 | Current |
| Nikon 24-200mm F4-6.3 | Z | 8.3× | 24mm | 200mm | f/4.0 | f/6.3 | Yes | 570g | 114mm | 2020 | Current |
| Tamron 50-400mm F4.5-6.3 | E, Z | 8.0× | 50mm | 400mm | f/4.5 | f/6.3 | Yes | 1155g | 183mm | 2022 | Current |
| Tamron 25-200mm F2.8-5.6 | E | 8.0× | 25mm | 200mm | f/2.8 | f/5.6 | No | 575g | 122mm | 2025 | Current |
| Tamron 28-200mm F2.8-5.6 | E | 7.1× | 28mm | 200mm | f/2.8 | f/5.6 | No | 576g | 117mm | 2020 | Current |
| Panasonic 28-200mm F4-7.1 | L | 7.1× | 28mm | 200mm | f/4.0 | f/7.1 | Yes | 413g | 93mm | 2024 | Current |

== APS-C superzoom lenses ==
This is a list of lenses designed for APS-C mirrorless cameras that have an optical zoom ratio greater than 7×. For comparison, the longest superzoom lens designed for DSLRs was the Tamron 18-400mm F3.5-6.3 for EF and F mounts, which had a 22× optical zoom ratio.

| Model | Lens mounts | Optical zoom | Focal length | | Aperture | | OIS | Weight | Length | Release year | Availability |
| Model | Lens mounts | Optical zoom | Wide | Tele | Wide | Tele | OIS | Weight | Length | Release year | Availability |
|---|---|---|---|---|---|---|---|---|---|---|---|
| Sigma 16-300mm F3.5-6.7 | RF | 18.8× | 26mm | 480mm | f/3.5 | f/6.7 | Yes | 625g | 121mm | 2025 | Current |
| Sigma 16-300mm F3.5-6.7 | L, E, X | 18.8× | 24mm | 450mm | f/3.5 | f/6.7 | Yes | 615g | 121mm | 2025 | Current |
| Tamron 18-300mm F3.5-6.3 | E, X | 16.7× | 27mm | 450mm | f/3.5 | f/6.3 | Yes | 620g | 126mm | 2021 | Current |
| Tamron 18-200mm F3.5-6.3 | EF-M | 11.1× | 29mm | 320mm | f/3.5 | f/6.3 | Yes | 460g | 97mm | 2014 | Discontinued |
| Tamron 18-200mm F3.5-6.3 | E | 11.1× | 27mm | 300mm | f/3.5 | f/6.3 | Yes | 460g | 97mm | 2011 | Discontinued |
| Samsung 18-200mm F3.5-6.3 | NX | 11.1× | 27mm | 300mm | f/3.5 | f/6.3 | Yes | 549g | 106mm | 2011 | Discontinued |
| Sony 18-200mm F3.5-6.3 LE | E | 11.1× | 27mm | 300mm | f/3.5 | f/6.3 | Yes | 460g | 97mm | 2012 | Current |
| Sony 18-200mm F3.5-6.3 | E | 11.1× | 27mm | 300mm | f/3.5 | f/6.3 | Yes | 524g | 99mm | 2010 | Current |
| Canon 18-150mm F3.5-6.3 | RF | 8.3× | 29mm | 240mm | f/3.5 | f/6.3 | Yes | 310g | 85mm | 2022 | Current |
| Canon 18-150mm F3.5-6.3 | EF-M | 8.3× | 29mm | 240mm | f/3.5 | f/6.3 | Yes | 300g | 87mm | 2016 | Discontinued |
| Nikon 18-140mm F3.5-6.3 | Z | 7.8× | 27mm | 210mm | f/3.5 | f/6.3 | Yes | 315g | 90mm | 2021 | Current |
| Sony 18-135mm F3.5-5.6 | E | 7.5× | 27mm | 203mm | f/3.5 | f/5.6 | Yes | 325g | 88mm | 2018 | Current |
| Fujifilm 18-135mm F3.5-5.6 | X | 7.5× | 27mm | 203mm | f/3.5 | f/5.6 | Yes | 490g | 98mm | 2014 | Current |

== Micro Four Thirds superzoom lenses ==
This is a list of Micro Four Thirds lenses that have an optical zoom ratio greater than 7×.

| Model | Optical zoom | Focal length | | Aperture | | OIS | Weight | Length | Release year | Availability |
| Model | Optical zoom | Wide | Tele | Wide | Tele | OIS | Weight | Length | Release year | Availability |
|---|---|---|---|---|---|---|---|---|---|---|
| Olympus 12-200mm F3.5-6.3 | 16.7× | 24mm | 400mm | f/3.5 | f/6.3 | No | 455g | 100mm | 2019 | Current |
| Olympus 14-150mm F4-5.6 II | 10.7× | 28mm | 300mm | f/4.0 | f/5.6 | No | 285g | 83mm | 2015 | Current |
| Olympus 14-150mm F4-5.6 | 10.7× | 28mm | 300mm | f/4.0 | f/5.6 | No | 280g | 83mm | 2010 | Discontinued |
| Tamron 14-150mm F3.5-5.8 | 10.7× | 28mm | 300mm | f/3.5 | f/5.8 | No | 285g | 80mm | 2014 | Discontinued |
| Panasonic 14-140mm F3.5-5.6 II | 10.0× | 28mm | 280mm | f/3.5 | f/5.6 | Yes | 265g | 75mm | 2019 | Current |
| Panasonic 14-140mm F3.5-5.6 | 10.0× | 28mm | 280mm | f/3.5 | f/5.6 | Yes | 265g | 75mm | 2013 | Discontinued |
| Panasonic 14-140mm F4-5.8 | 10.0× | 28mm | 280mm | f/4.0 | f/5.8 | Yes | 460g | 84mm | 2009 | Discontinued |
| Olympus 12-100mm F4 | 8.3× | 24mm | 200mm | f/4.0 | f/4.0 | Yes | 561g | 117mm | 2016 | Current |

== Nikon 1 superzoom lenses ==
This is a list of Nikon 1 lenses that have an optical zoom ratio greater than 7×.

| Model | Optical zoom | Focal length | | Aperture | | OIS | Weight | Length | Release year | Availability |
| Model | Optical zoom | Wide | Tele | Wide | Tele | OIS | Weight | Length | Release year | Availability |
|---|---|---|---|---|---|---|---|---|---|---|
| Nikon 10-100mm F4-5.6 | 10.0× | 27mm | 270mm | f/4.0 | f/5.6 | Yes | 298g | 71mm | 2012 | Discontinued |
| Nikon 10-100mm F4.5-5.6 PD (Note: Power zoom.) | 10.0× | 27mm | 270mm | f/4.5 | f/5.6 | Yes | 515g | 95mm | 2011 | Discontinued |

== See also ==
- List of standard zoom lenses
- List of superzoom compact cameras
- List of bridge cameras
- List of kit lenses
- List of pancake lenses
