= Sony E 18-200mm F3.5-6.3 OSS =

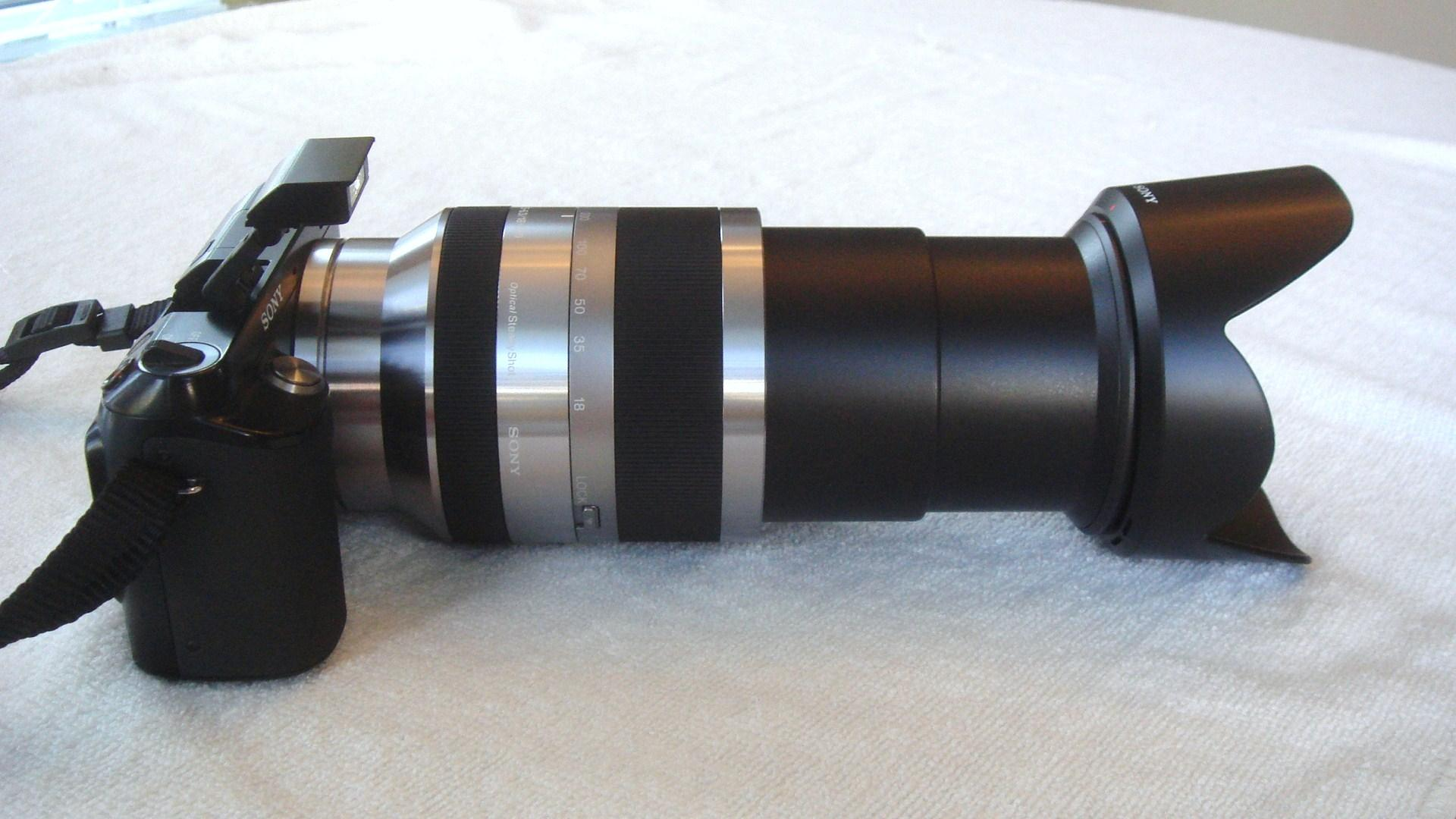
- Sony 18-200mm lens attached to an NEX-5N
- Maker: Sony
- Lens mount: Sony E-mount

Technical data
- Type: Zoom
- Focus drive: Micromotor Autofocus
- Focal length: 18-200mm
- Focal length (35mm equiv.): 27-300mm
- Image format: APS-C
- Aperture (max/min): f/3.5 - 6.3, 22.0 - 40.0
- Close focus distance: 0.3 metres (0.98 ft) - 0.5 metres (1.6 ft)
- Max. magnification: 0.35x
- Diaphragm blades: 7
- Construction: 17 elements in 12 groups

Features
- Manual focus override: Yes Yes
- Weather-sealing: No No
- Lens-based stabilization: Yes Yes
- Aperture ring: No No
- Application: Multipurpose

Physical
- Max. length: 99.0 millimetres (3.90 in)
- Diameter: 75.5 millimetres (2.97 in)
- Weight: 524 grams (1.155 lb)
- Filter diameter: 67mm

Accessories
- Lens hood: ALC-SH100 (Petal-type)

History
- Introduction: 2010

Retail info
- MSRP: $899 USD

The Sony E 18-200mm F3.5-6.3 OSS is a variable maximum aperture superzoom lens for the Sony E-mount, released by Sony in 2010.

The lens was originally designed by Sony for their E-mount camcorders, but became exceedingly popular among users of their compact mirrorless E-mount cameras.

== Build quality ==
The lens features an all-plastic construction with rubber focus and zoom rings. The barrel of the lens telescopes outward from the main lens body as it's zoomed in from 18mm to 200mm. To combat zoom creep, the lens features a small zoom lock switch on the main lens barrel.

The zoom lens features a wide range of focal lengths, from wide angle at its shortest to super-telephoto at its longest.

== Power zoom version ==
On September 12, 2012, Sony released a "power zoom" version, Sony E PZ 18-200mm F3.5-6.3 OSS (SEL-P18200), of their original 18-200mm E-mount superzoom lens for their E-mount camcorders.

On the side of the lens barrel is a trio of switches controlling the lens' "power zoom", zooming speed, and Autofocus (Servo)-Manual Focus switch. These added features have increased the size and weight of the lens slightly from the original.

The lens is optically identical to the original non-power zoom version.

== See also ==
- List of Sony E-mount lenses
- List of superzoom lenses
- Sony E PZ 18-105mm F4 G OSS
- Sony E 18-200mm F3.5-6.3 OSS LE
