= Olympus M.Zuiko Digital ED 14-150mm f/4-5.6 =

M.Zuiko Digital ED 14-150mm f4.0-5.6 MSC
- Maker: Olympus Corporation

Technical data
- Type: Standard Zoom
- Focal length: 14-150mm
- Focal length (35mm equiv.): 28-300mm
- Aperture (max/min): f/4.0-5.6
- Close focus distance: 0.25m (9.84 in)
- Max. magnification: 0.24
- Diaphragm blades: 7
- Construction: 15 elements in 11 groups

Features
- Lens-based stabilization: No No
- Macro capable: No No

Physical
- Max. length: 83 mm (3.27 in)
- Diameter: 63.5 mm (2.50 in)
- Weight: 280g (9.88 oz)
- Filter diameter: Ø58 mm

Angle of view
- Diagonal: 75-8.2°

History
- Introduction: 2010

The M.Zuiko Digital ED 14–150 mm f/4.0-5.6 MSC is a Micro Four Thirds System lens by Olympus Corporation. It is sold as a standalone item, and also offered as a kit with any Olympus PEN camera.

== See also ==
- List of superzoom lenses
