= Canon EF-M 18–150mm lens =

Canon EF-M 18–150 mm f/3.5–6.3 IS STM
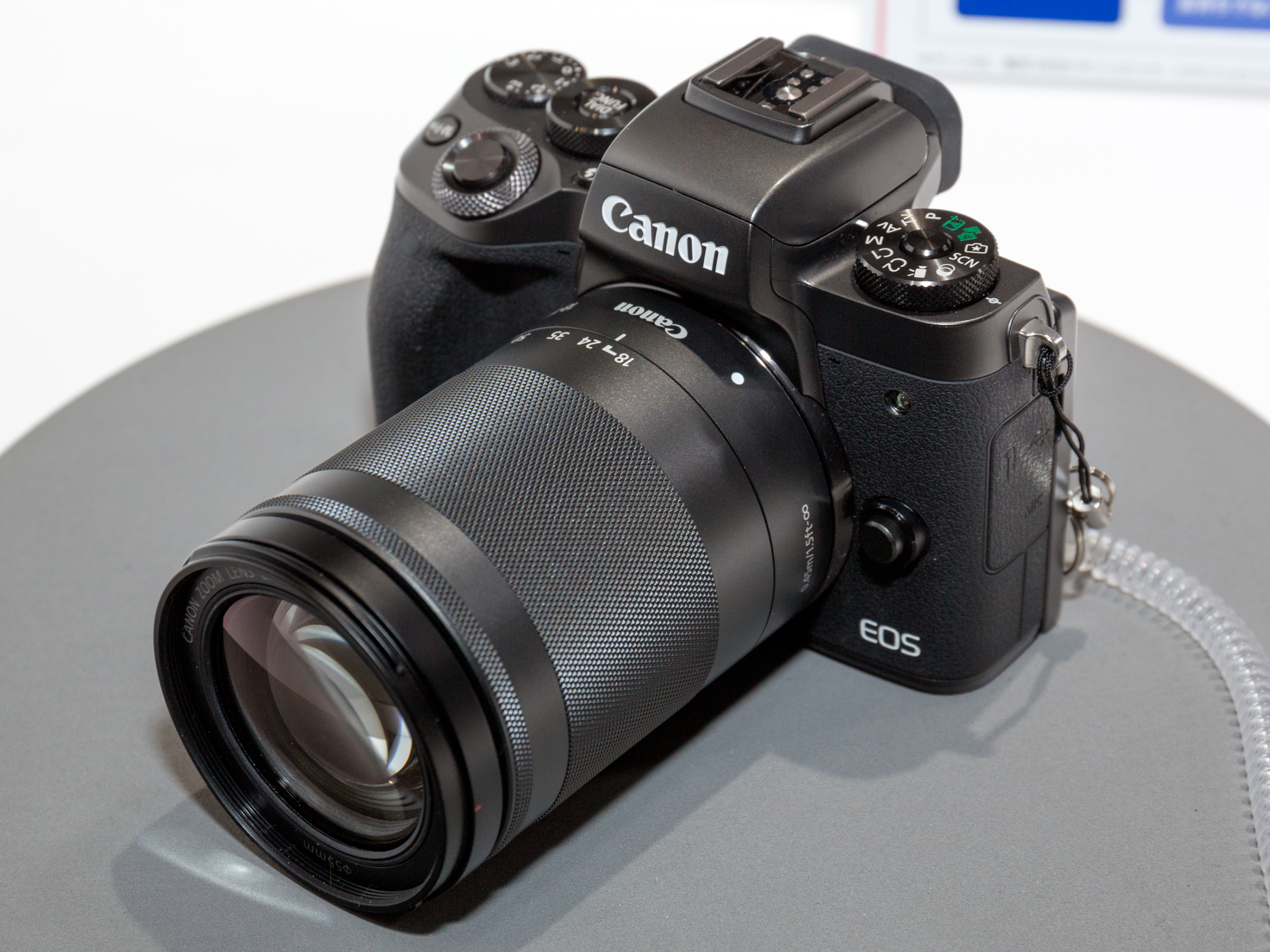
- EF-M 18–150 mm mounted at an EOS M5
- Maker: Canon
- Lens mount: Canon EF-M

Technical data
- Type: Zoom
- Focus drive: Stepping motor
- Focal length: 18 mm – 150 mm
- Focal length (35mm equiv.): 29 mm – 240 mm
- Crop factor: 1.6
- Aperture (max/min): f/3.5 – 6.3 / f/22 – 38 (40 at 1/3 steps)
- Close focus distance: 0.25 m (0.82 ft) (at 18 – 50 mm), 0.45 m (1.5 ft) (at 150 mm)
- Max. magnification: 0.31× (at 150 mm)
- Diaphragm blades: 9
- Construction: 17 elements in 13 groups

Features
- Weather-sealing: No No
- Lens-based stabilization: Yes Yes

Physical
- Max. length: 86.5 mm (3.41 in)
- Diameter: 60.9 mm (2.40 in)
- Weight: 300 g (0.66 lb)
- Filter diameter: 55 mm

Accessories
- Lens hood: EW-60F
- Case: LP816

Angle of view
- Horizontal: 64°30′ – 8°40′
- Vertical: 45°30′ – 5°45′
- Diagonal: 74°20′ – 10°25′

History
- Introduction: 2016
- Discontinuation: 2023

Retail info
- MSRP: 499.99 USD (as of September 2016)

The Canon EF-M 18-150mm f/3.5-6.3 IS STM is an interchangeable telezoom lens for the Canon EOS M system of mirrorless cameras. It was announced by Canon on September 15, 2016, together with the EOS M5.

== See also ==
- List of superzoom lenses
