= Panasonic Lumix 14–140mm lens =

Lumix 14–140mm
- Maker: Panasonic

Technical data
- Type: Superzoom
- Focal length: 14-140mm
- Focal length (35mm equiv.): 28-280mm
- Aperture (max/min): f/4.0-5.8 - f/
- Close focus distance: 0.5 m (19.7 in)
- Max. magnification: 0.2
- Construction: 17 elements in 13 groups

Features
- Lens-based stabilization: Yes Yes
- Macro capable: No No

Physical
- Max. length: 84 mm (3.31 in)
- Diameter: 70 mm (2.76 in)
- Weight: 380g (12.4 oz)
- Filter diameter: 62 mm

History
- Introduction: 2009

The Panasonic Lumix Vario 14-140mm is a zoom lens for Micro Four Thirds system cameras; the first version, distinguished by its maximum aperture of f/4.0–5.8, served as the bundled kit lens for the Panasonic Lumix DMC-GH1, and later GH2; for other cameras, it was available for separate purchase. As the Panasonic GHn camera line are designed for both still photography and video, the lens has a fast, quiet autofocus motor and a stepless aperture diaphragm, hence the "HD" branding.

It was discontinued in 2013 after Panasonic released a faster, smaller lens covering the same focal length range with a maximum aperture of f/3.5–5.6. The second version was replaced by a new version in 2019, which included a gasket for weather and dust resistance, but was unchanged optically.

== History ==
The original lens exhibited some softness in the corners at maximum aperture for the extreme wide and telephoto focal length settings, which could be mitigated by stopping down to f/5.6. It includes four aspherical lens elements and two extra-low dispersion elements. In-camera distortion correction is used to compensate for barrel distortion and vignetting.

The updated, smaller lens was released in April 2013. It was initially still marketed as an HD lens. Later the HD markings were dropped and the zoom range was printed on the barrel in silver rather than yellow. In testing, the newer lens was sharper in the corners and showed a bit more barrel distortion over the zoom range, while the older lens was sharper in the center and had virtually no distortion at focal lengths between 18 and 140mm. The updated lens was revised in 2019 to add dust and splash resistance.

Panasonic Lumix Vario HD 14–140mm variants
| Name Spec | | LUMIX G VARIO HD 14-140mm F4.0-5.8 ASPH. MEGA O.I.S. | LUMIX G VARIO 14-140mm F3.5-5.6 ASPH. POWER O.I.S. | LUMIX G VARIO 14-140mm F3.5-5.6 II ASPH. POWER O.I.S. |
|---|---|---|---|---|
| Model no. | | H-VS014140 | H-FS14140 | H-FSA14140 |
| Image | | | | —N/a |
| Released | | 2009 | 2013 | 2019 |
| Max. aperture | | f/4.0–5.8 | f/3.5–5.6 | |
| Constr. | Eles. | 17 | 14 | |
| Constr. | Grps. | 13 | 12 | |
| Closest focus | | 0.50 m (19.7 in) | 0.30 m (11.8 in) (f=14–21 mm); 0.50 m (19.7 in) (f=22–140 mm) | |
| Dims. | Filter (mm) | 62 | 58 | |
| Dims. | Dia. | 70 mm (2.8 in) | 67 mm (2.6 in) | |
| Dims. | Len. | 84 mm (3.3 in) | 75 mm (3.0 in) | |
| Dims. | Wgt. | 460 g (16.2 oz) | 265 g (9.3 oz) | |
| Ref. | | | | |

== See also ==
- List of superzoom lenses
