= Sony E 18-200mm F3.5-6.3 OSS LE =

- Maker: Sony
- Lens mount(s): Sony E-mount

Technical data
- Type: Zoom
- Focus drive: Micromotor Autofocus
- Focal length: 18-200mm
- Focal length (35mm equiv.): 27-300mm
- Image format: APS-C
- Aperture (max/min): f/3.5 - 6.3, 22.0 - 40.0
- Close focus distance: 0.5 metres (1.6 ft) - 0.5 metres (1.6 ft)
- Max. magnification: 0.27x
- Diaphragm blades: 7
- Construction: 17 elements in 13 groups

Features
- Manual focus override: Yes Yes
- Weather-sealing: No No
- Lens-based stabilization: Yes Yes
- Aperture ring: No No
- Unique features: Lite Edition (LE) lens
- Application: Multipurpose

Physical
- Max. length: 97.0 millimetres (3.82 in)
- Diameter: 68.0 millimetres (2.68 in)
- Weight: 460 grams (1.01 lb)
- Filter diameter: 67mm

History
- Introduction: 2012

Retail info
- MSRP: $899 USD

The Sony E 18-200mm F3.5-6.3 OSS LE is a variable maximum aperture superzoom lens for the Sony E-mount, released by Sony on May 17, 2012. The lens was designed to better accommodate users of Sony's E-mount mirrorless cameras in weight and size.

== Build quality ==
The lens features an all-plastic construction with rubber focus and zoom rings. The barrel of the lens telescopes outward from the main lens body as it's zoomed in from 18mm to 200mm. To combat zoom creep, the lens features a small zoom lock switch on the main lens barrel.

== Optics ==
The lens features an entirely new optical formula. The Tamron 18-200mm F/3.5-6.3 Di III VC is "nearly identical".

Compared to its predecessor (the Sony E 18-200mm F3.5-6.3 OSS), this lens is softer and suffers from greater chromatic aberration. However, distortion has been reduced in the new design.

== See also ==
- List of Sony E-mount lenses
- List of superzoom lenses
- Sony E 18-200mm F3.5-6.3 OSS
