= Olympus M.Zuiko Digital ED 14-150mm f/4-5.6 II =

Photographic lens produced by Olympus Corporation

- Maker: Olympus Corporation
- Lens mount: Micro Four Thirds

Technical data
- Type: Zoom
- Focus drive: Micromotor
- Focal length: 14-150mm
- Focal length (35mm equiv.): 28-300mm
- Crop factor: 2
- Aperture (max/min): f/4-5.6
- Close focus distance: 0.5 metres (1.6 ft)
- Max. magnification: 0.22
- Diaphragm blades: 7, rounded
- Construction: 15 elements in 11 groups

Features
- Weather-sealing: Yes Yes
- Lens-based stabilization: No No

Physical
- Diameter: 64 millimetres (2.5 in)
- Weight: 285 grams (0.628 lb)
- Filter diameter: 58mm

Accessories
- Lens hood: LH-61C

History
- Introduction: 2015

Retail info
- MSRP: 599.99 USD

The Olympus M.Zuiko Digital ED 14-150mm f/4-5.6 II is a Micro Four Thirds superzoom lens announced by Olympus Corporation on February 5, 2015.

== See also ==
- List of superzoom lenses
