= Nikon Nikkor Z 28-400 mm f/4-8 VR =

Photographic lens for Nikon Z mount

NIKKOR Z 28-400 mm f/4–8 VR
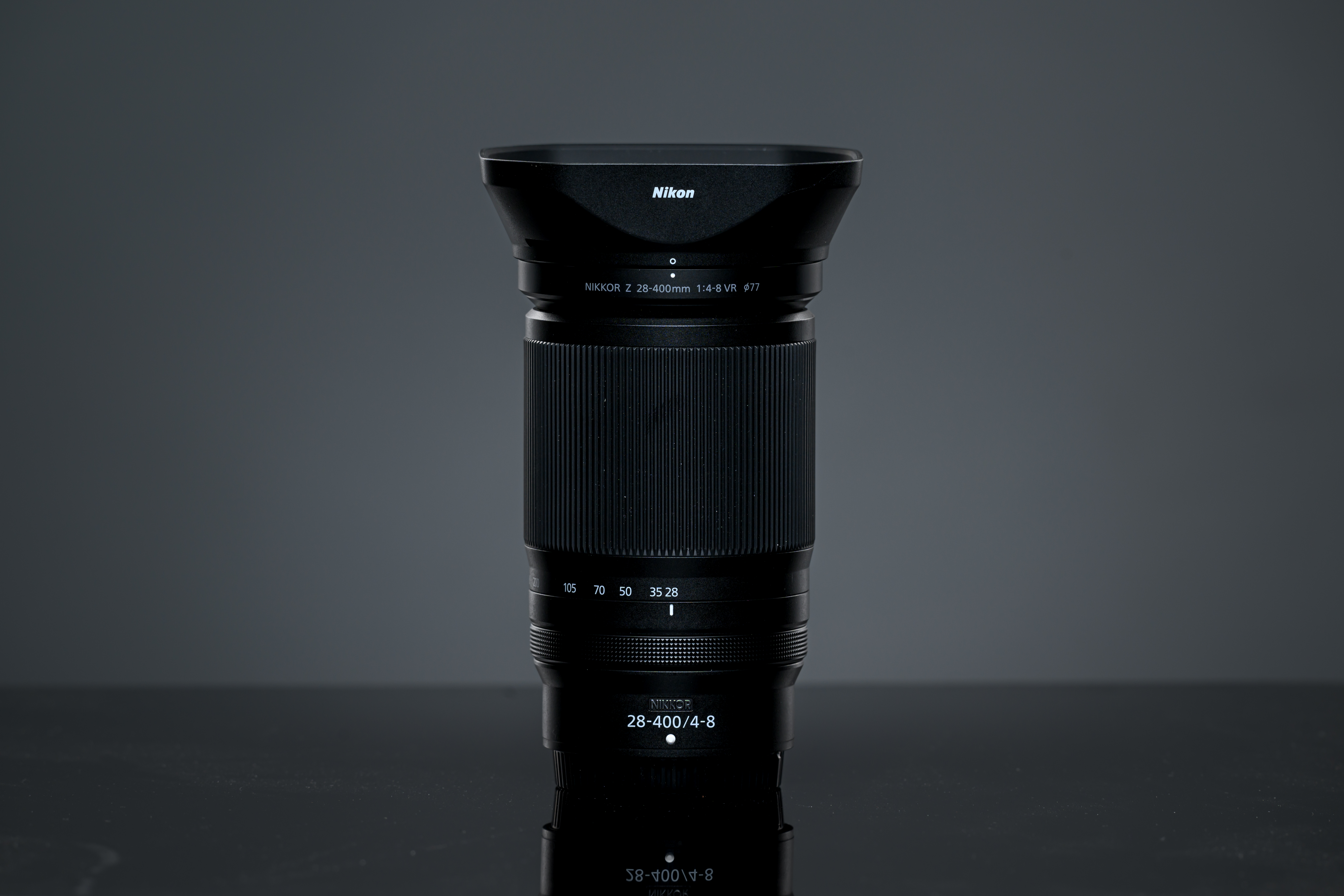
- Maker: Nikon
- Lens mount: Z-mount

Technical data
- Type: Zoom
- Focus drive: Stepping motor
- Focal length: 28-400mm
- Image format: FX (full frame)
- Aperture (max/min): f/4–22 (wide) f/8–45 (tele)
- Close focus distance: 0.2m (wide); 1.2m (tele)
- Max. magnification: 1:2.9
- Diaphragm blades: 9 (rounded)
- Construction: 21 elements in 15 groups

Features
- Lens-based stabilization: Yes Yes
- Macro capable: No No
- Application: Superzoom

Physical
- Max. length: 141.5 mm
- Diameter: 84.5 mm
- Weight: 725 g
- Filter diameter: 77 mm

Software
- Lens ID: 48

Accessories
- Lens hood: HB-114 (bayonet)
- Case: CL-C2

Angle of view
- Diagonal: 75°–6°10' (FX); 53°–4° (DX)

History
- Introduction: March 2024

Retail info
- MSRP: 1,399.95 USD (as of 2025)

The Nikon NIKKOR Z 28-400 mm f/4–8 VR is a full-frame superzoom lens with a variable aperture of f/4–8, manufactured by Nikon for use on Nikon Z-mount mirrorless cameras.

== Introduction ==
The lens was introduced on March 27, 2024 with an MSRP of $1299.95 USD. The lens comes with a bayonet-type, square-shaped lens hood (HB-114).

== Features ==
The lens provides the following features and functions:

- 28-400 mm focal length (approximately equivalent field of view of a 42-600 mm lens when used on a DX format camera)
- Autofocus using a stepping motor (STM), focus-by-wire manual focus ring
- 21 elements in 15 groups (including four ED glass and three aspherical lens elements)
- Nine-blade rounded diaphragm
- Vibration Reduction (VR) optical stabilization
- One customizable control ring at the back (manual focusing by default, aperture, ISO and exposure compensation functions can be assigned to it)
- Switch for locking zoom at its shortest focal length

== Sample images ==
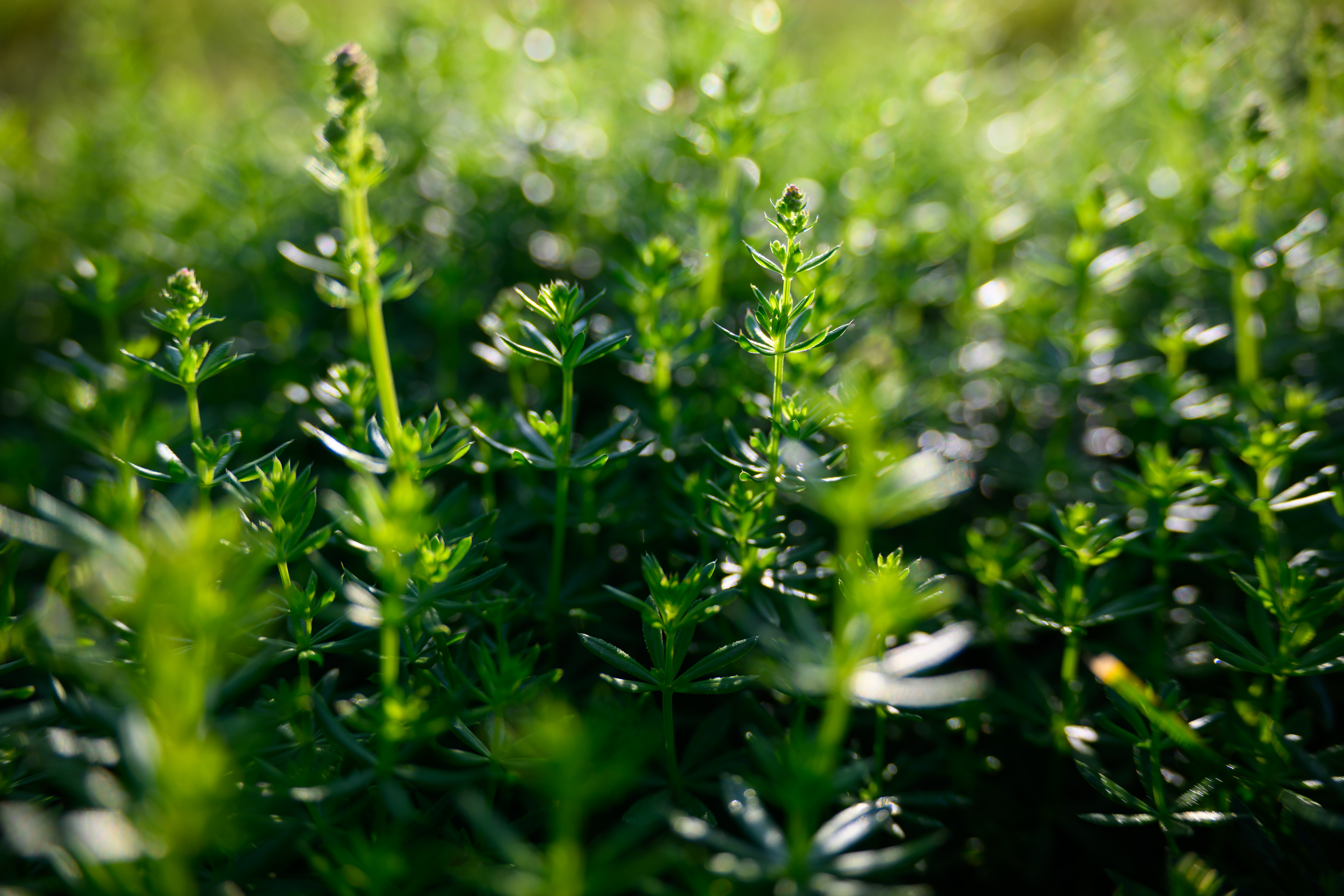
At 28 mm, f/4

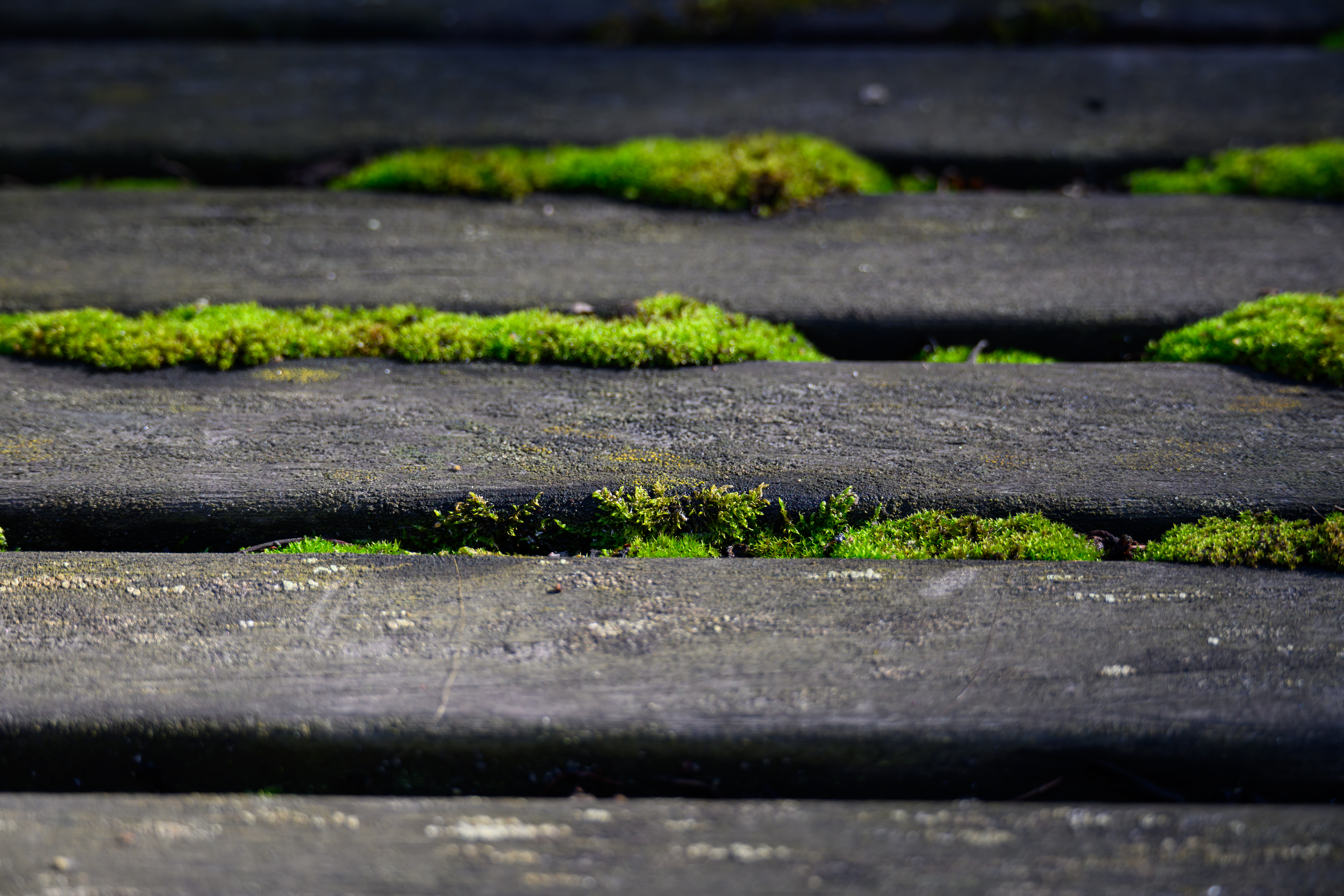
At 84 mm, f/6

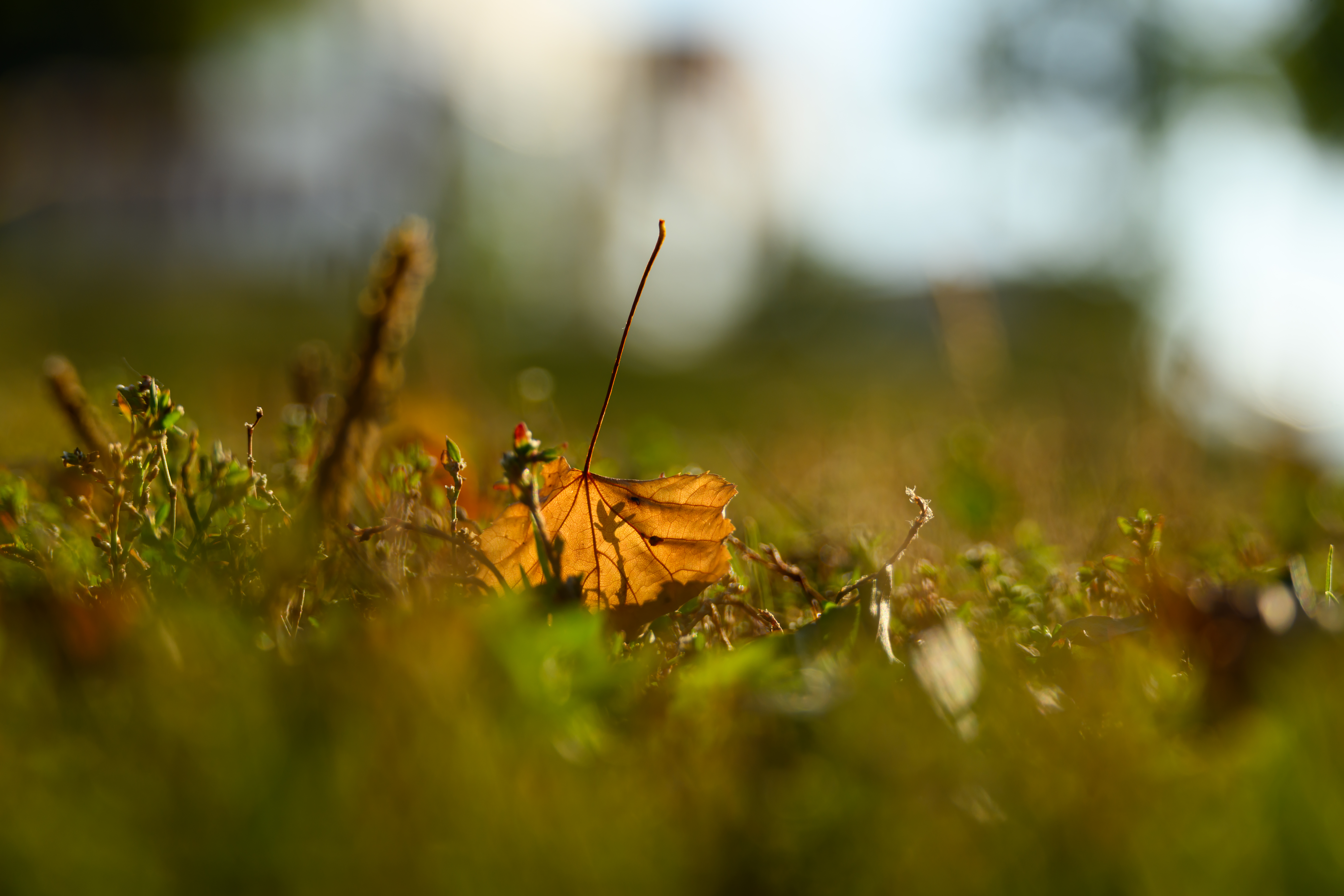
At 140 mm, f/7.1

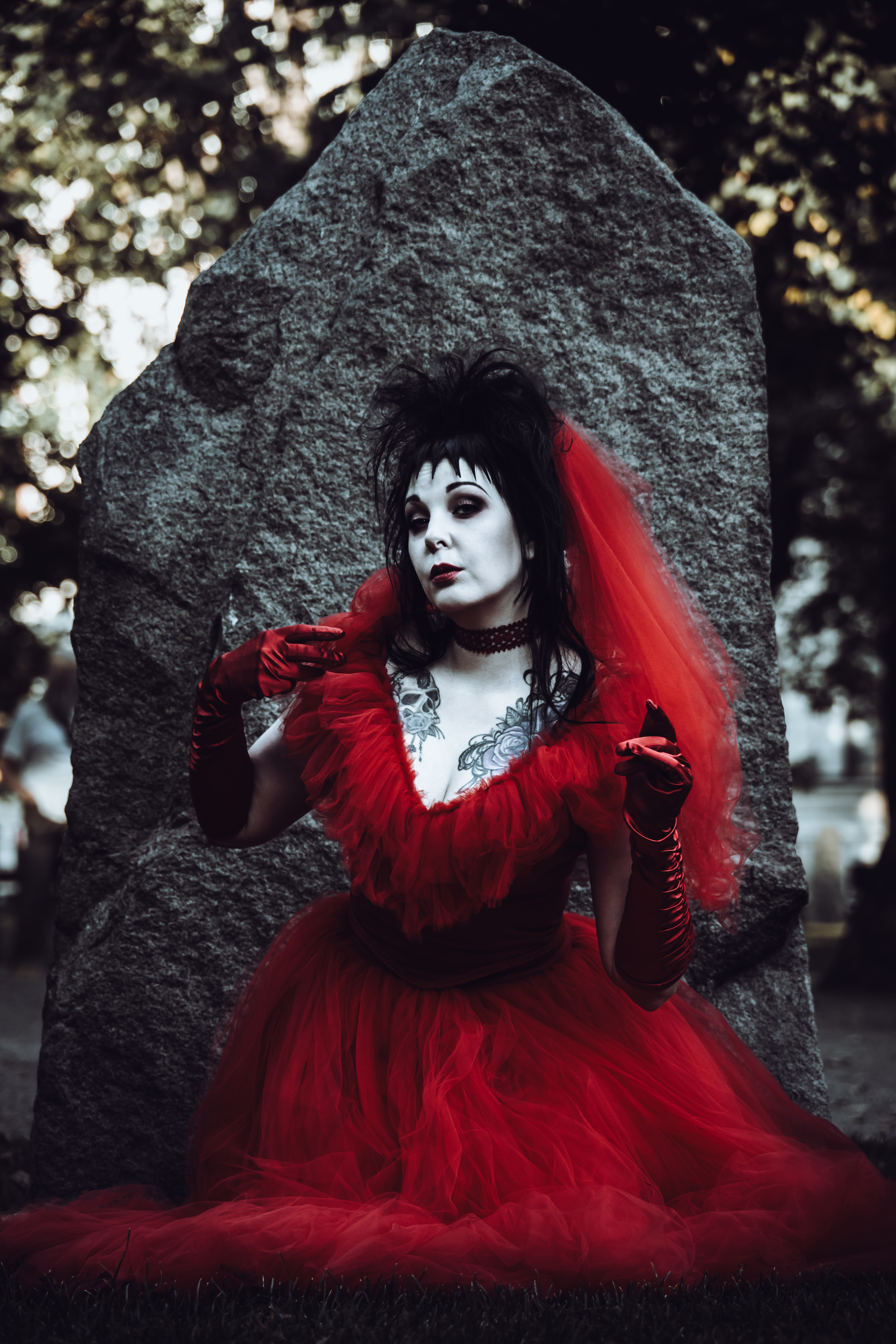
At 155 mm, f/7.6

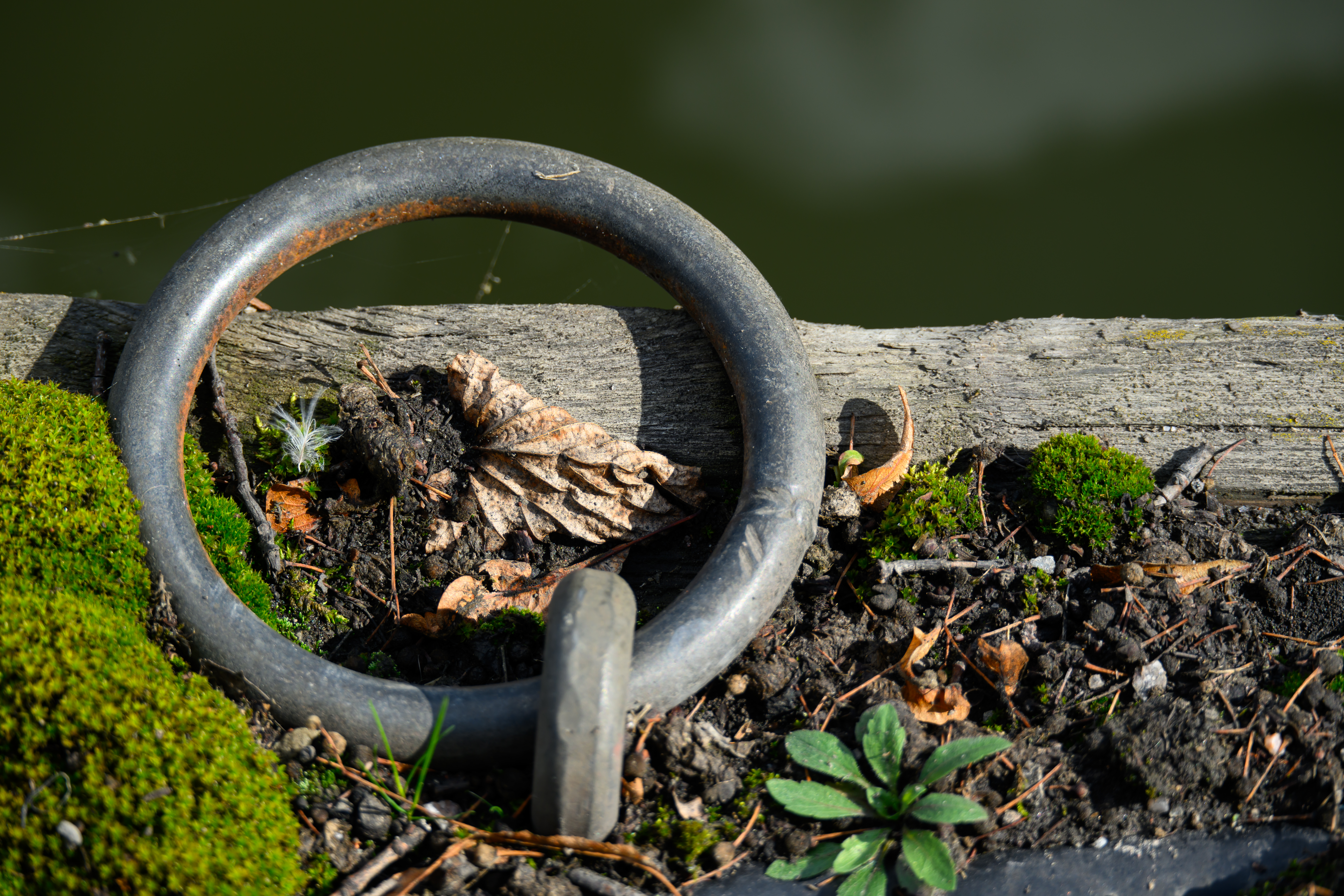
At 160 mm, f/7.6

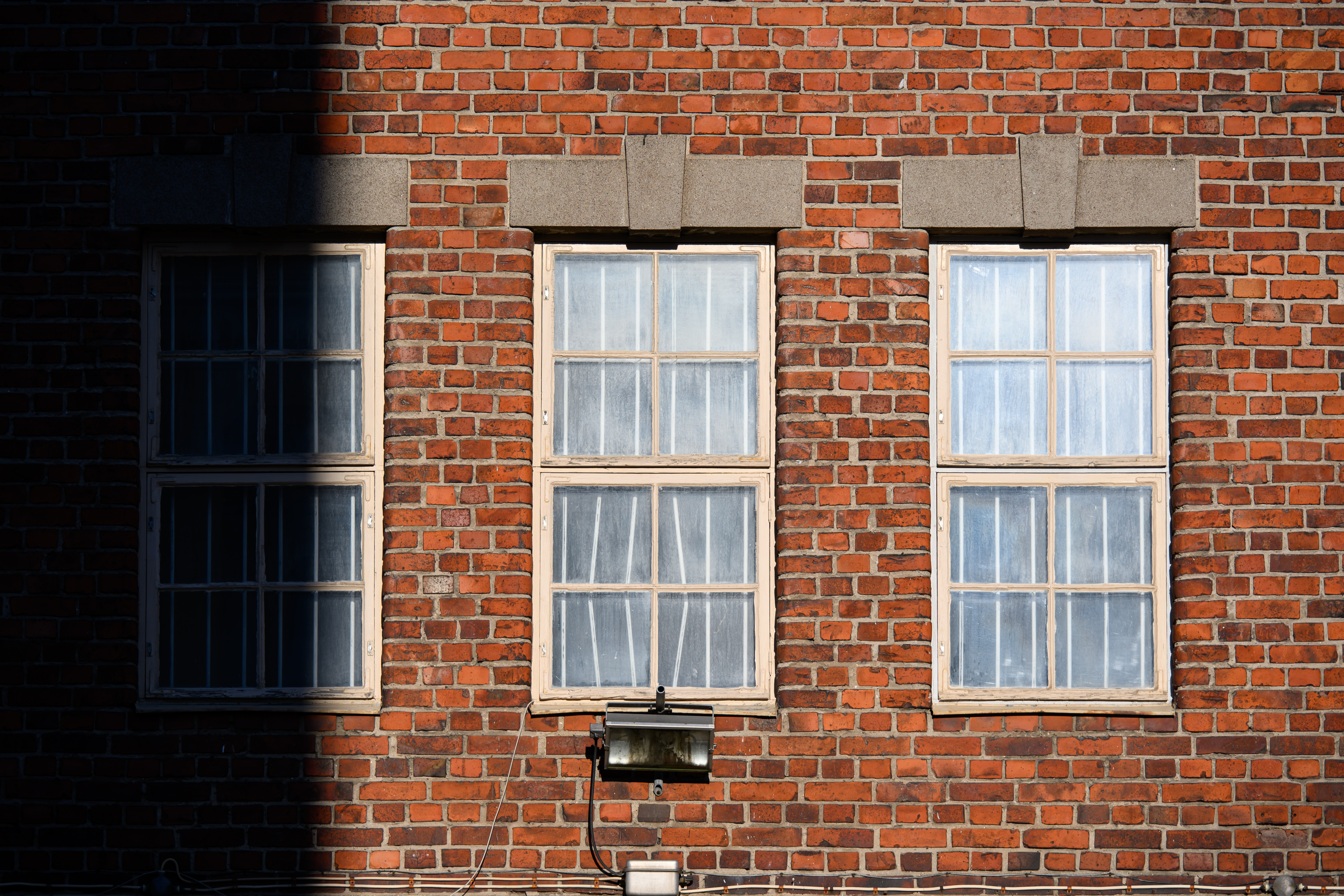
At 165 mm, f/7.6

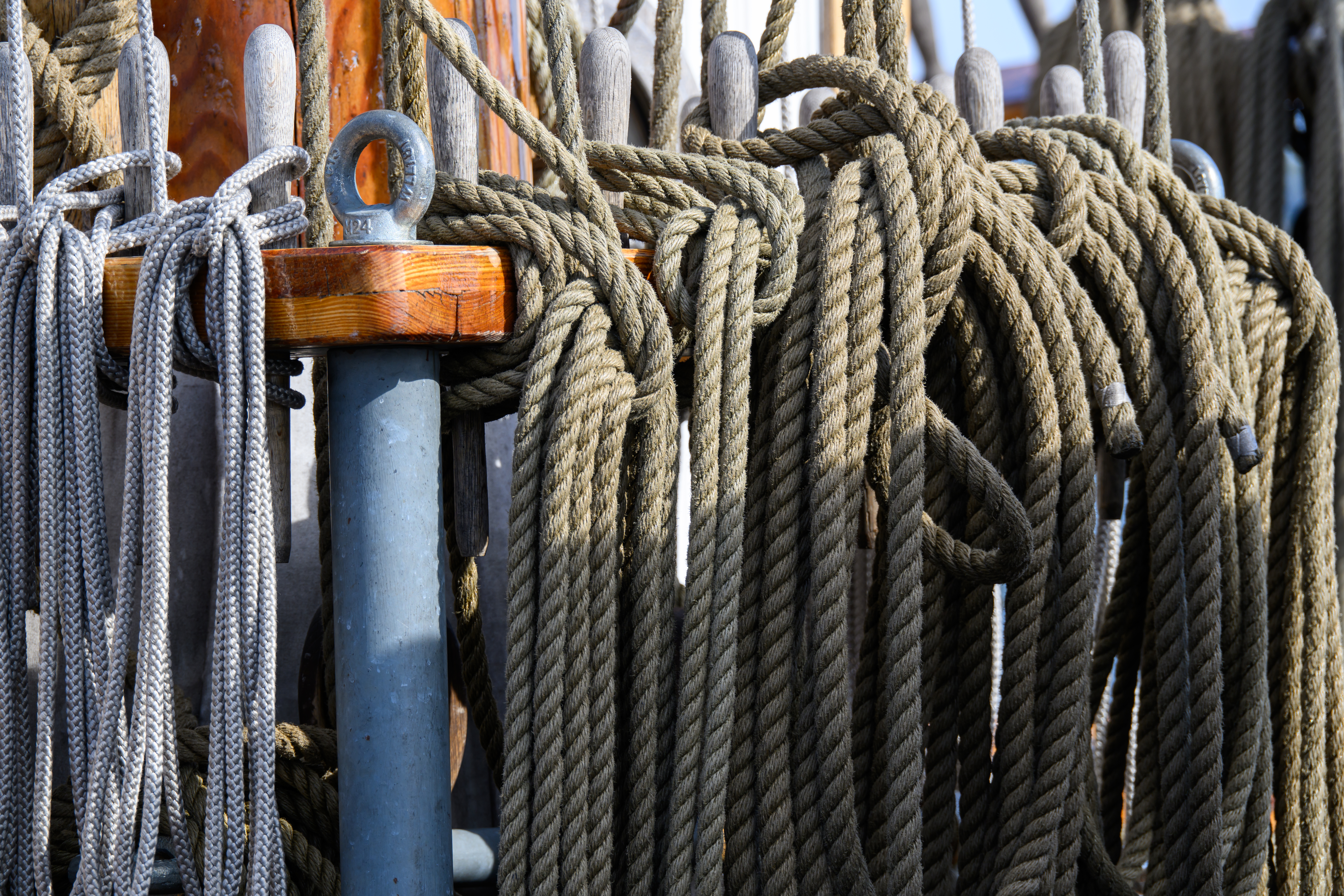
At 200 mm, f/8

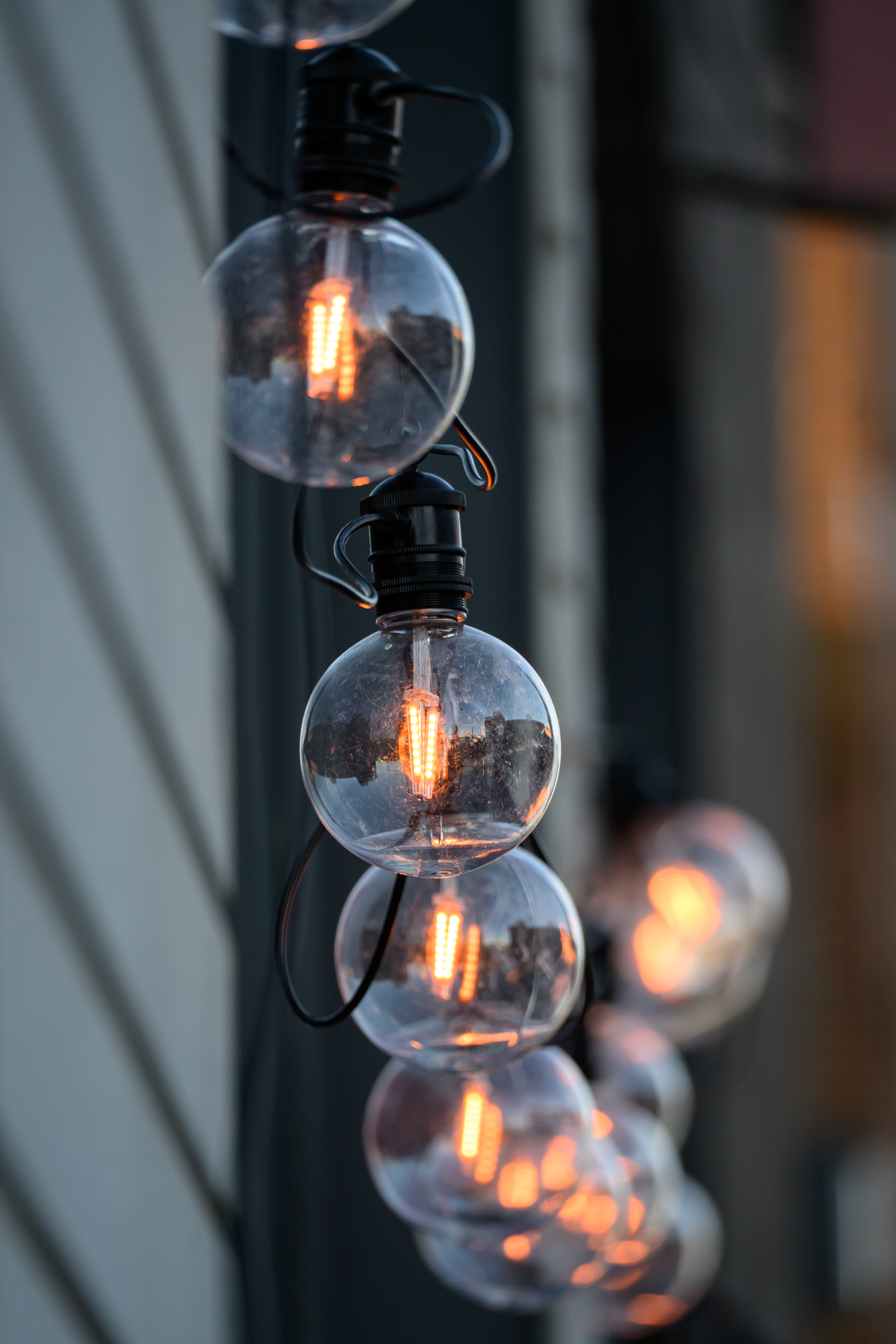
At 370 mm, f/8

== See also ==
- Nikon Z-mount
