= Nikon Nikkor Z 24-200 mm f/4-6.3 VR =

Nikkor Z 24-200 mm f/4–6.3 VR
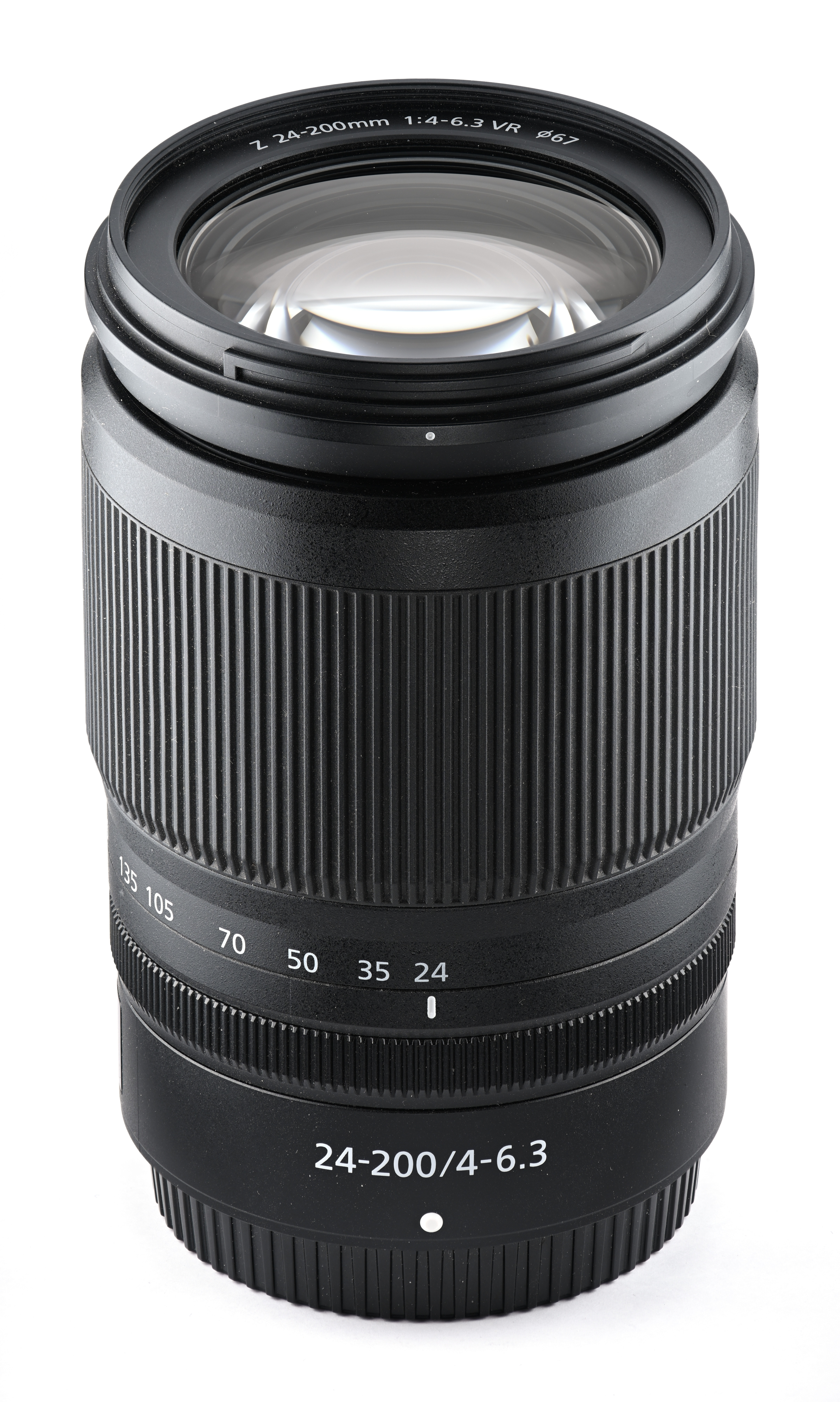
- Maker: Nikon
- Lens mount: Z-mount

Technical data
- Type: Zoom
- Focus drive: Stepping motor
- Focal length: 24-200mm
- Image format: FX (full frame)
- Aperture (max/min): f/4–22 (wide) f/6.3–36 (tele)
- Close focus distance: 0.5m (wide); 0.7m (tele)
- Max. magnification: 1:3.6
- Diaphragm blades: 7 (rounded)
- Construction: 19 elements in 15 groups

Features
- Lens-based stabilization: Yes Yes
- Macro capable: No No
- Unique features: ARNEO Coat elements Fluorine Coat
- Application: Superzoom

Physical
- Max. length: 114 mm
- Diameter: 76.5 mm
- Weight: 570 g
- Filter diameter: 67 mm

Software
- Lens ID: 18

Accessories
- Lens hood: HB-93 (bayonet)
- Case: CL-C1

Angle of view
- Diagonal: 84°–12°20' (FX); 61°–8° (DX)

History
- Introduction: February 2020

Retail info
- MSRP: 900 USD (as of 2020)

The Nikon Nikkor Z 24-200 mm f/4–6.3 VR is a full-frame superzoom lens with a variable aperture of f/4–6.3, manufactured by Nikon for use on Nikon Z-mount mirrorless cameras.

== Introduction ==
The lens was introduced on February 12, 2020, along with the Nikkor Z 20 mm f/1.8 S. The lens comes with a bayonet-type lens hood (HB-93).

== Features ==
- 24-200 mm focal length (approximately equivalent field of view of a 36-300 mm lens when used on a DX format camera)
- Autofocus using a stepping motor (STM), focus-by-wire manual focus ring
- 19 elements in 15 groups (including 2 ED glass, 1 aspherical ED glass and 2 aspherical lens elements, elements with ARNEO coat, and a fluorine-coated front lens element)
- 7-blade rounded diaphragm
- Vibration reduction (VR) optical stabilization
- Internal focusing (IF lens)
- One customizable control ring at the back (manual focusing by default, aperture, ISO and exposure compensation functions can be assigned to it)
- Switch for locking zoom at the widest focal length
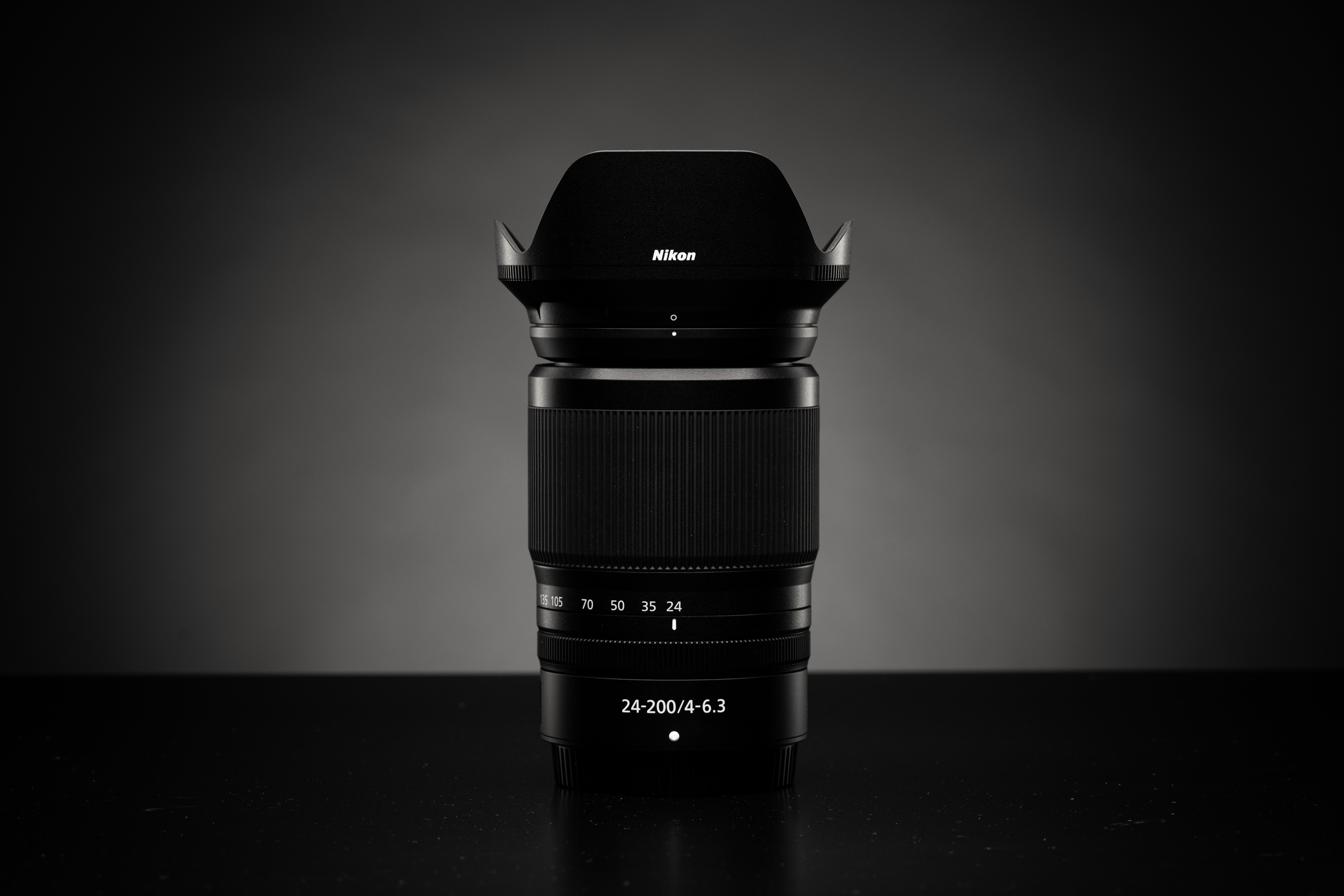
With lens hood attached

== Sample images ==
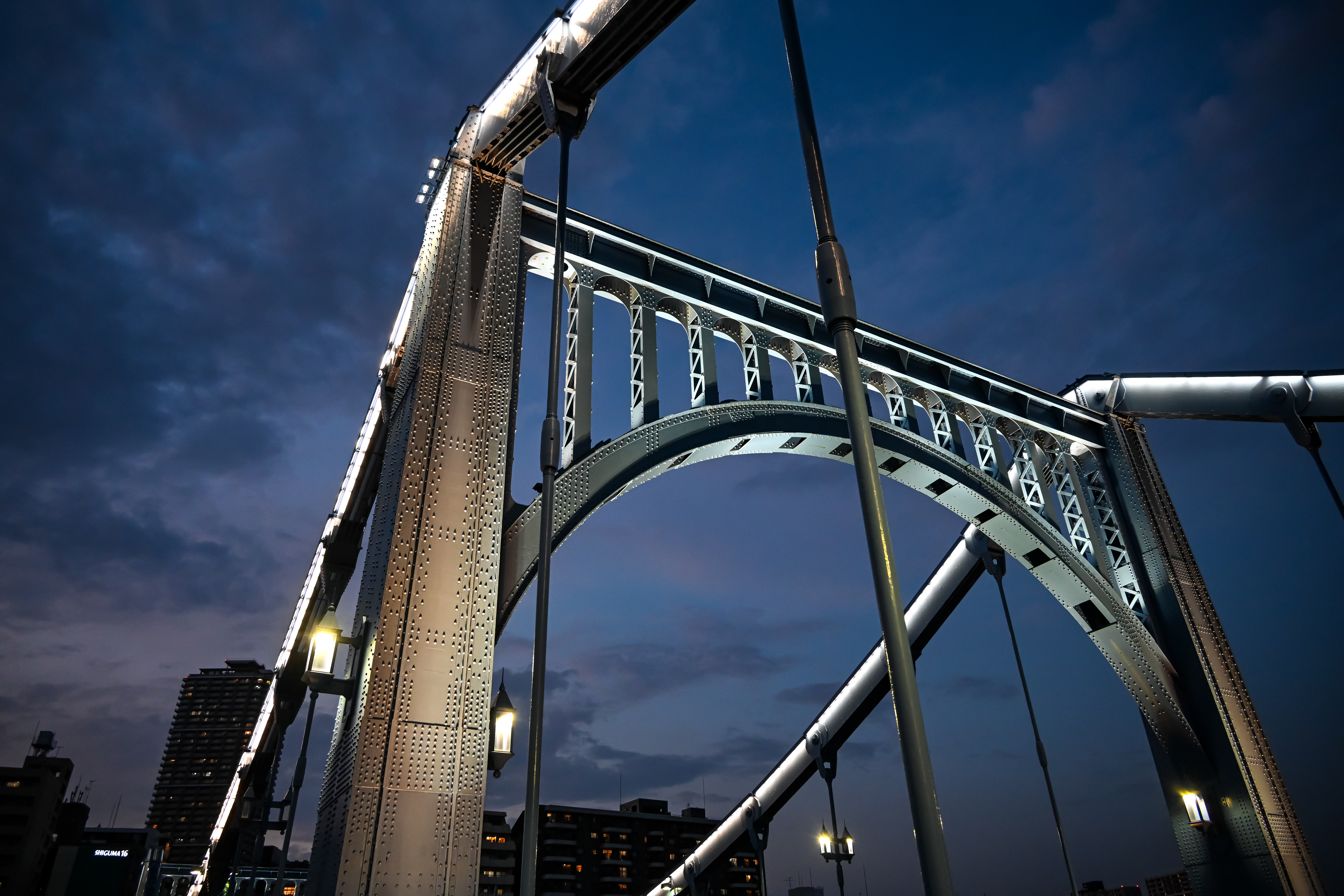
At 24 mm, f/4

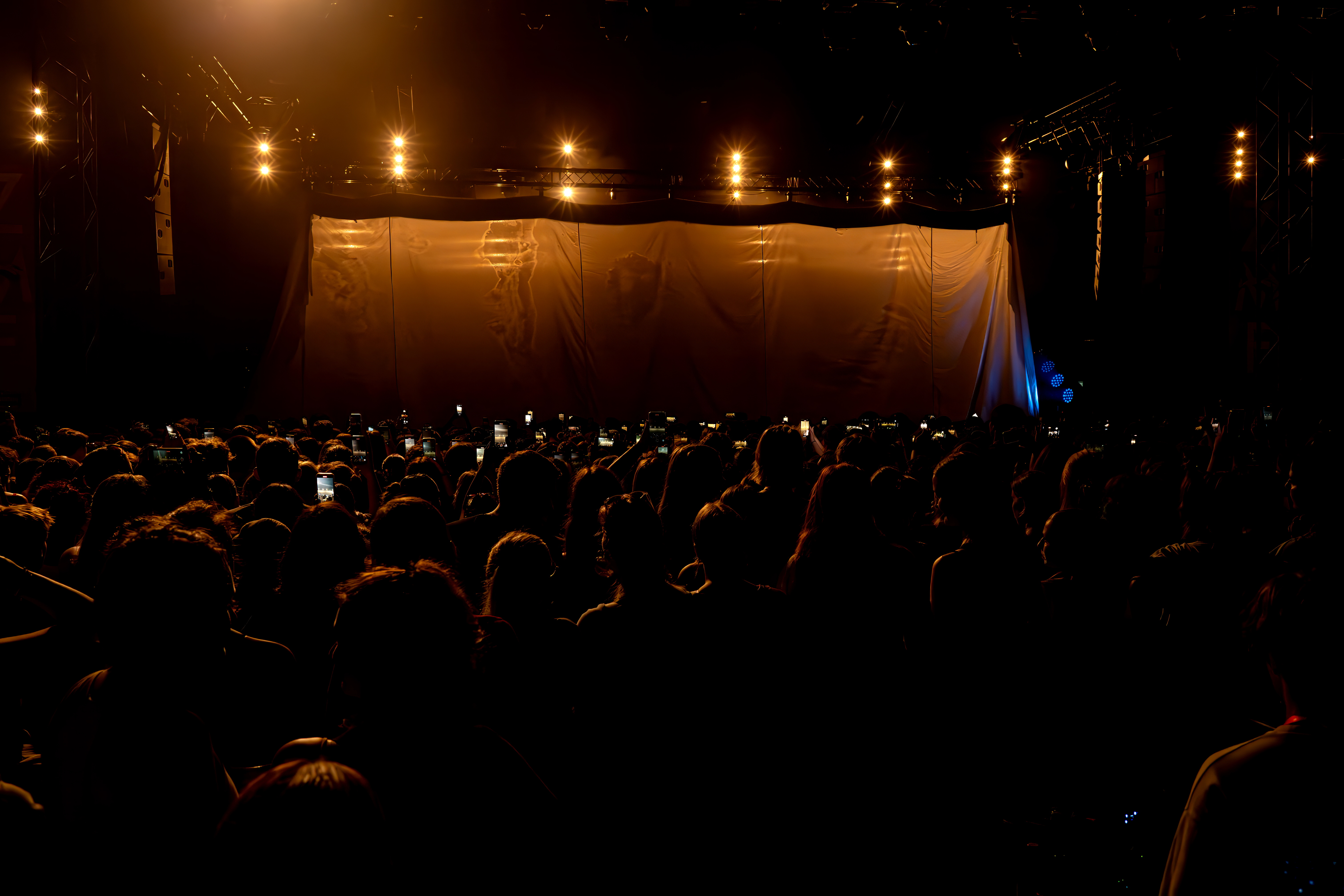
At 34.5 mm, f/7.1

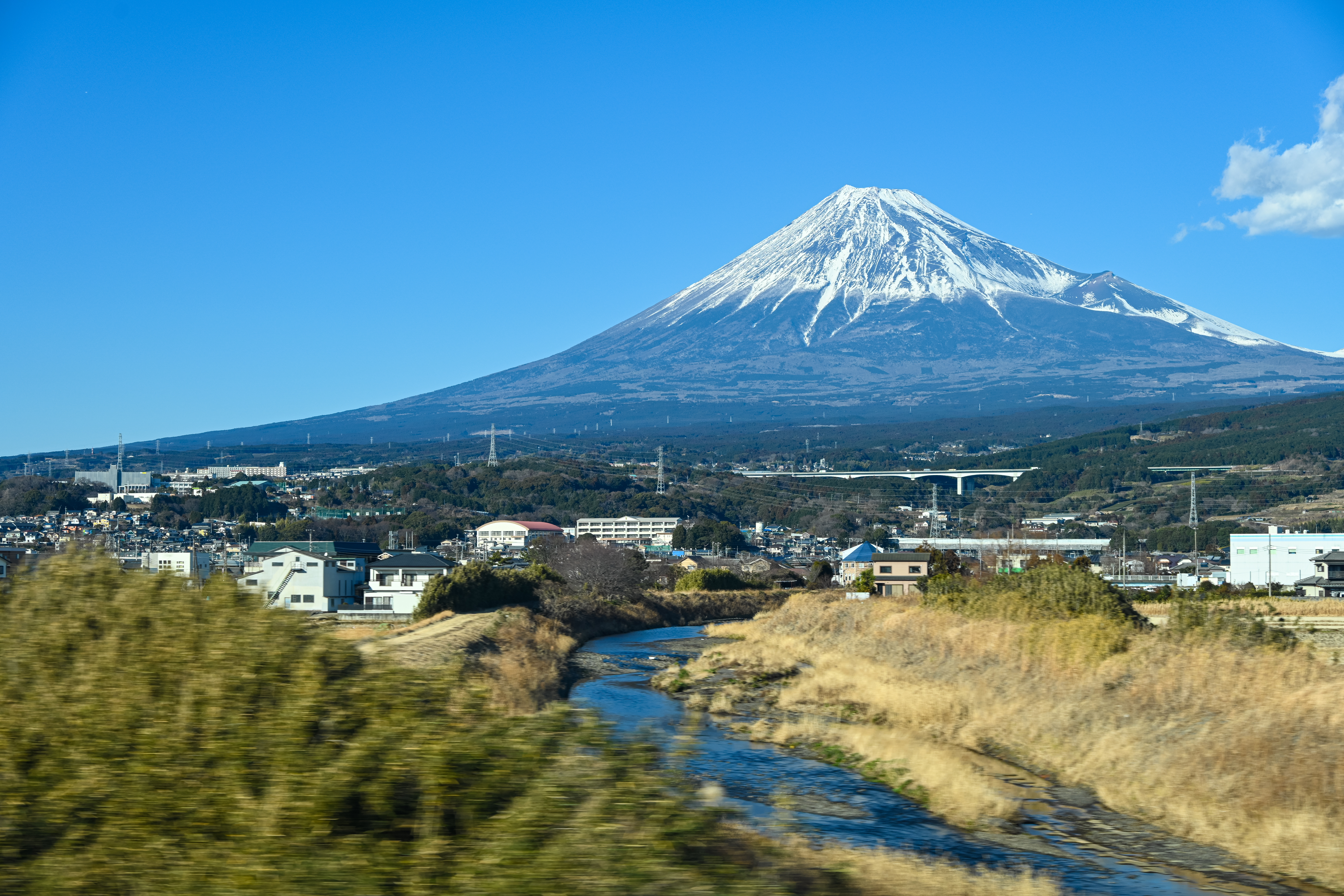
At 61 mm, f/6.3

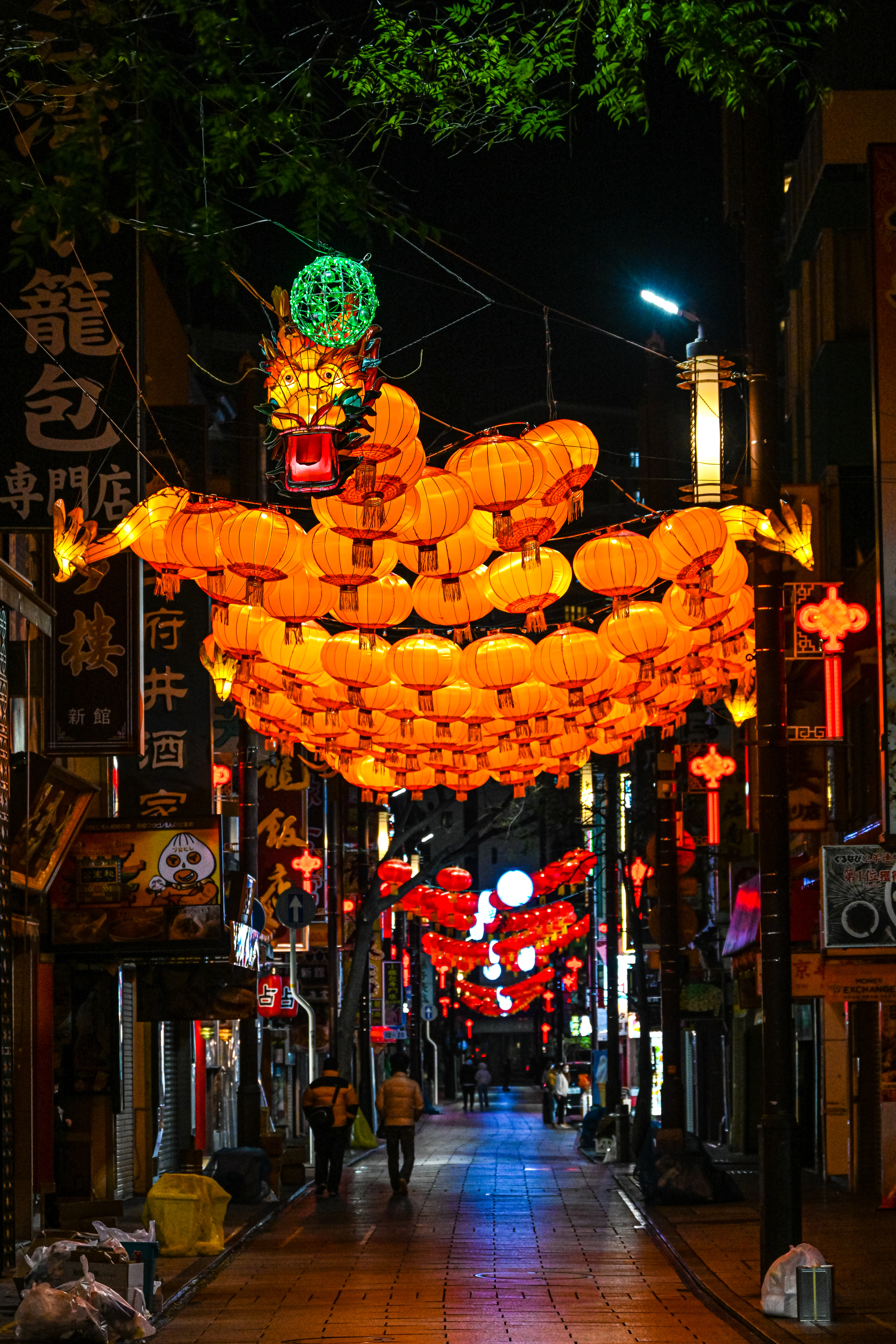
At 102 mm, f/6.3

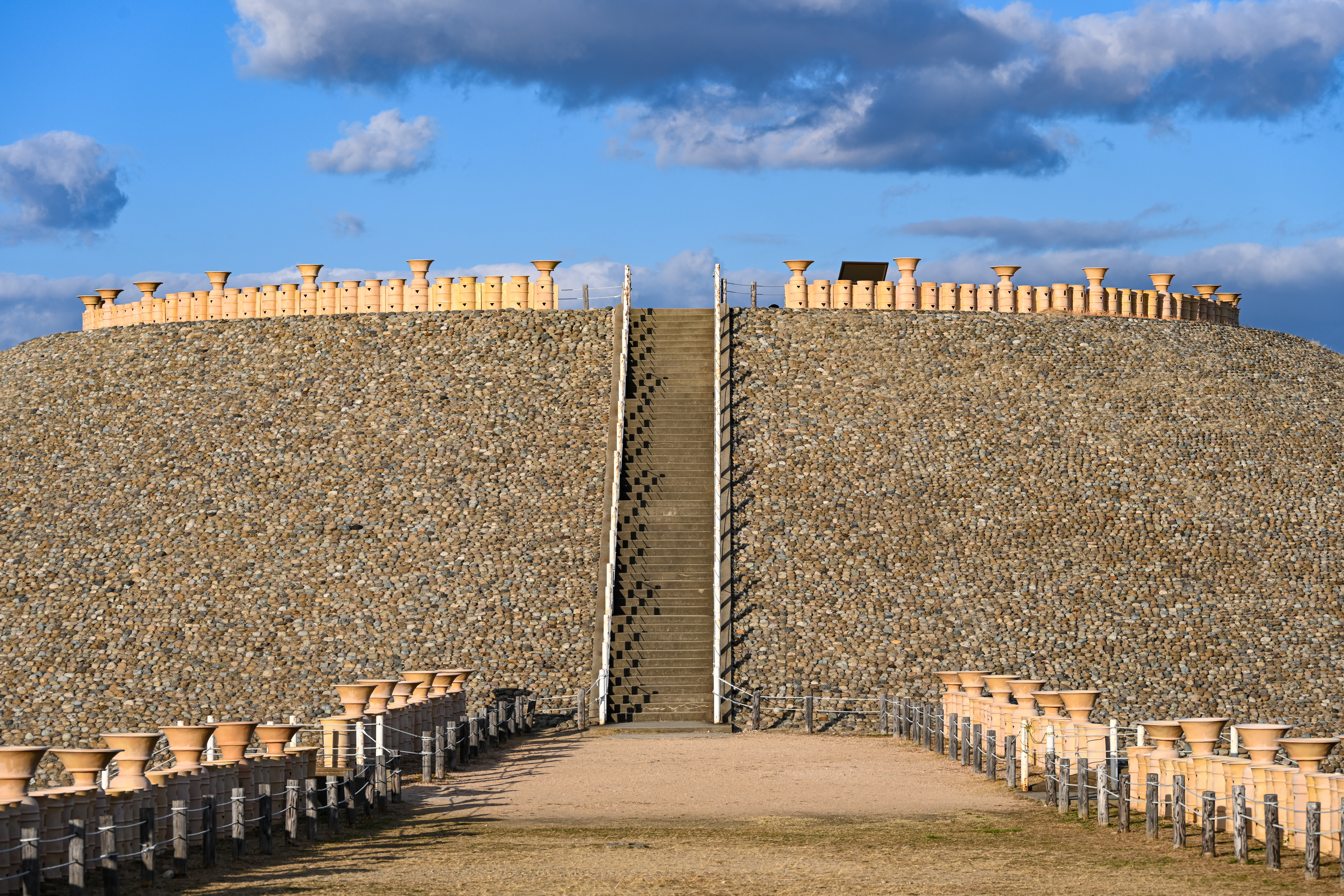
At 105 mm, f/7.1

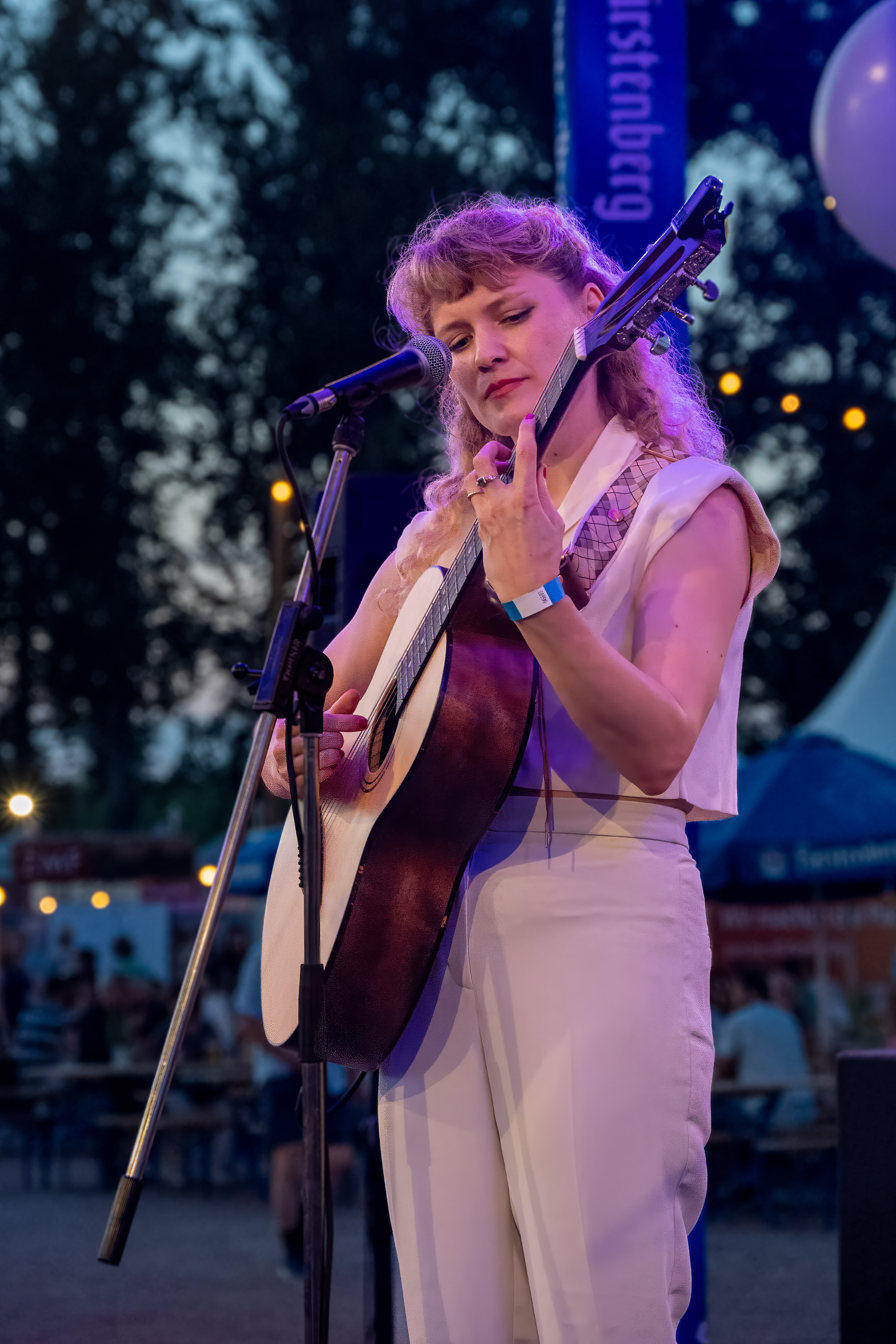
At 115 mm, f/7.1

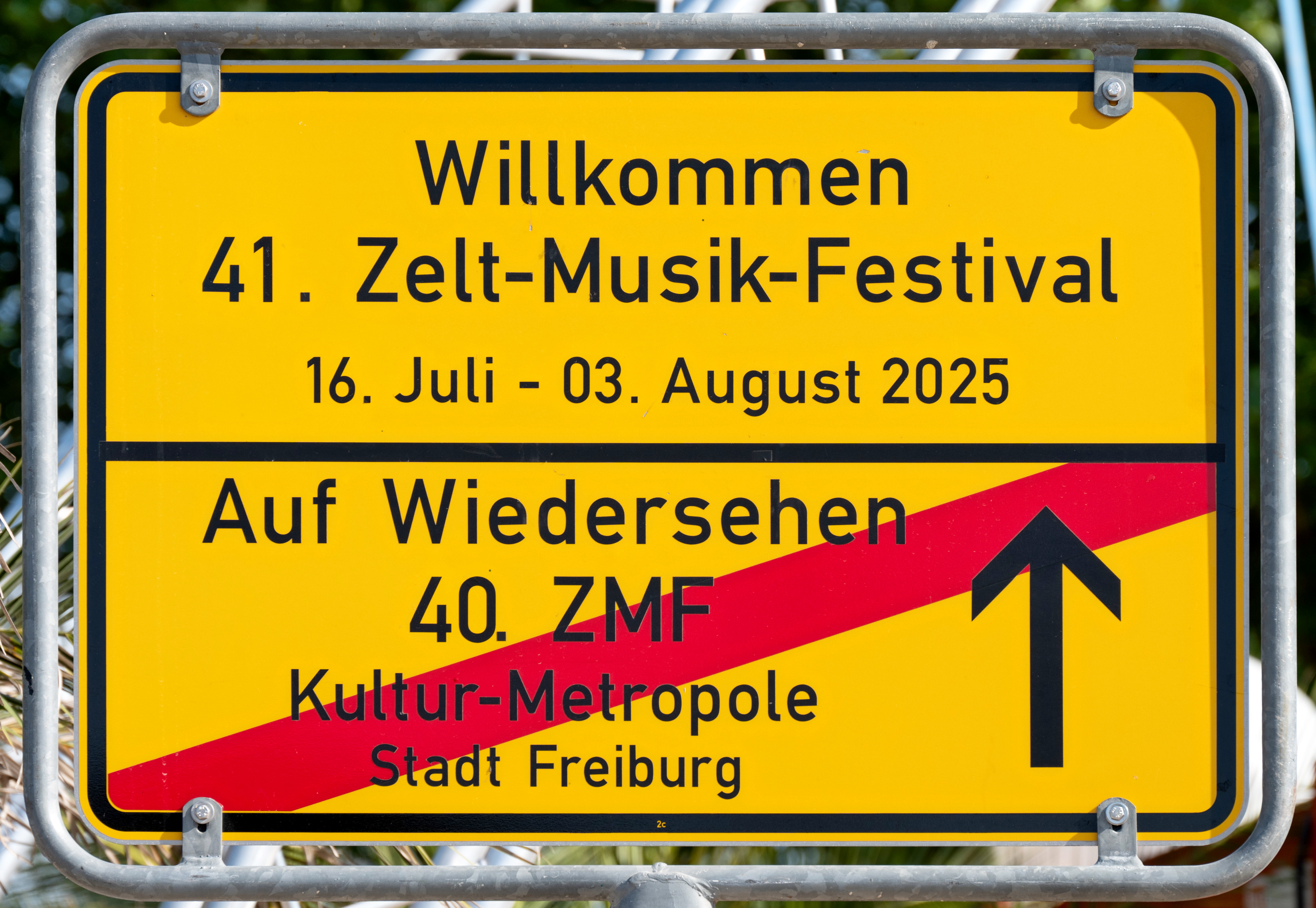
At 150 mm, f/8

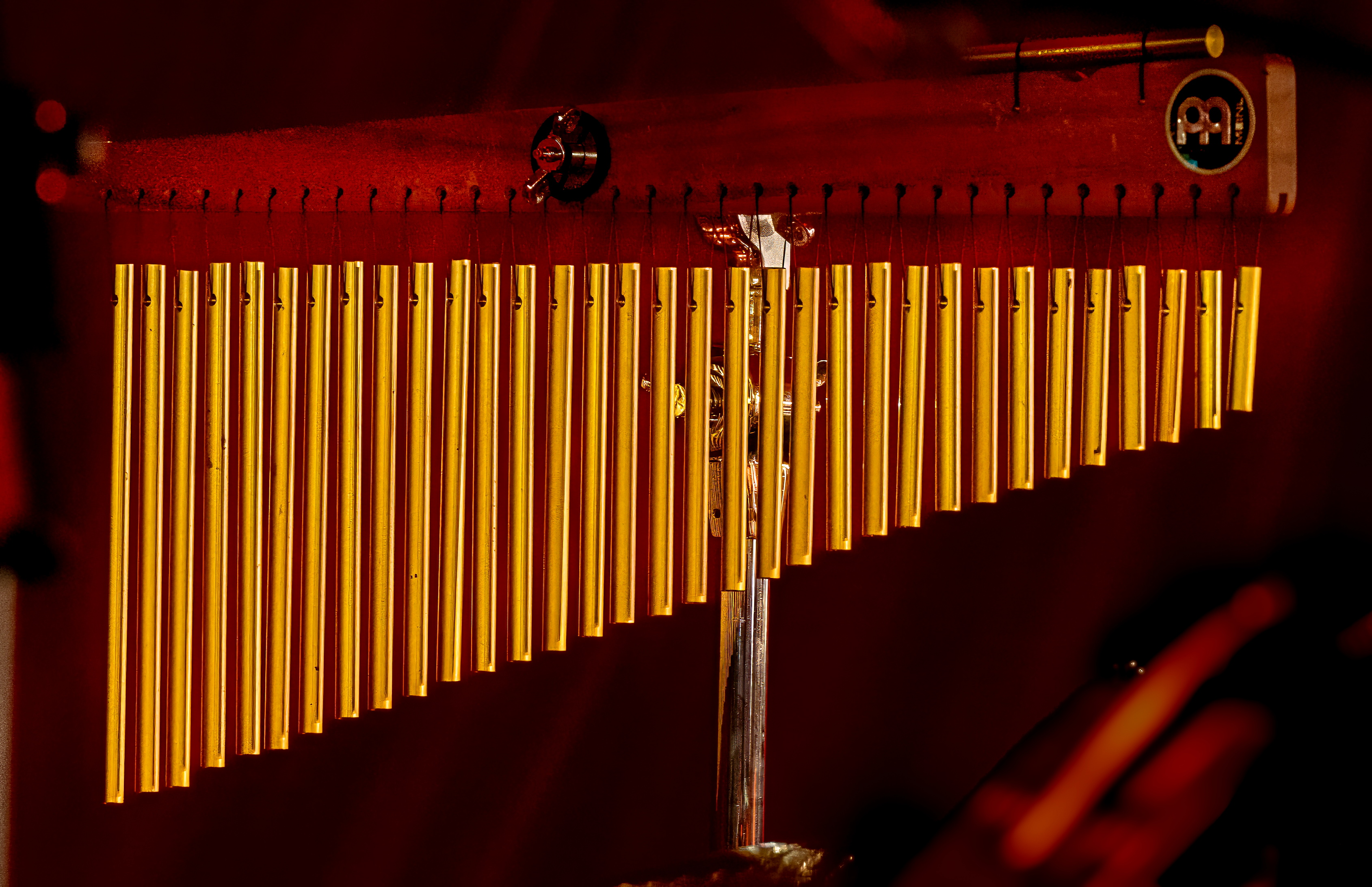
At 200 mm, f/8

== See also ==
- Nikon Z-mount
